= Siamese–Vietnamese War (1840–1845) =

Mid 19th-century conflict between Siam and Vietnam

- Part of Siamese–Vietnamese Wars and Vietnamese invasions of Cambodia
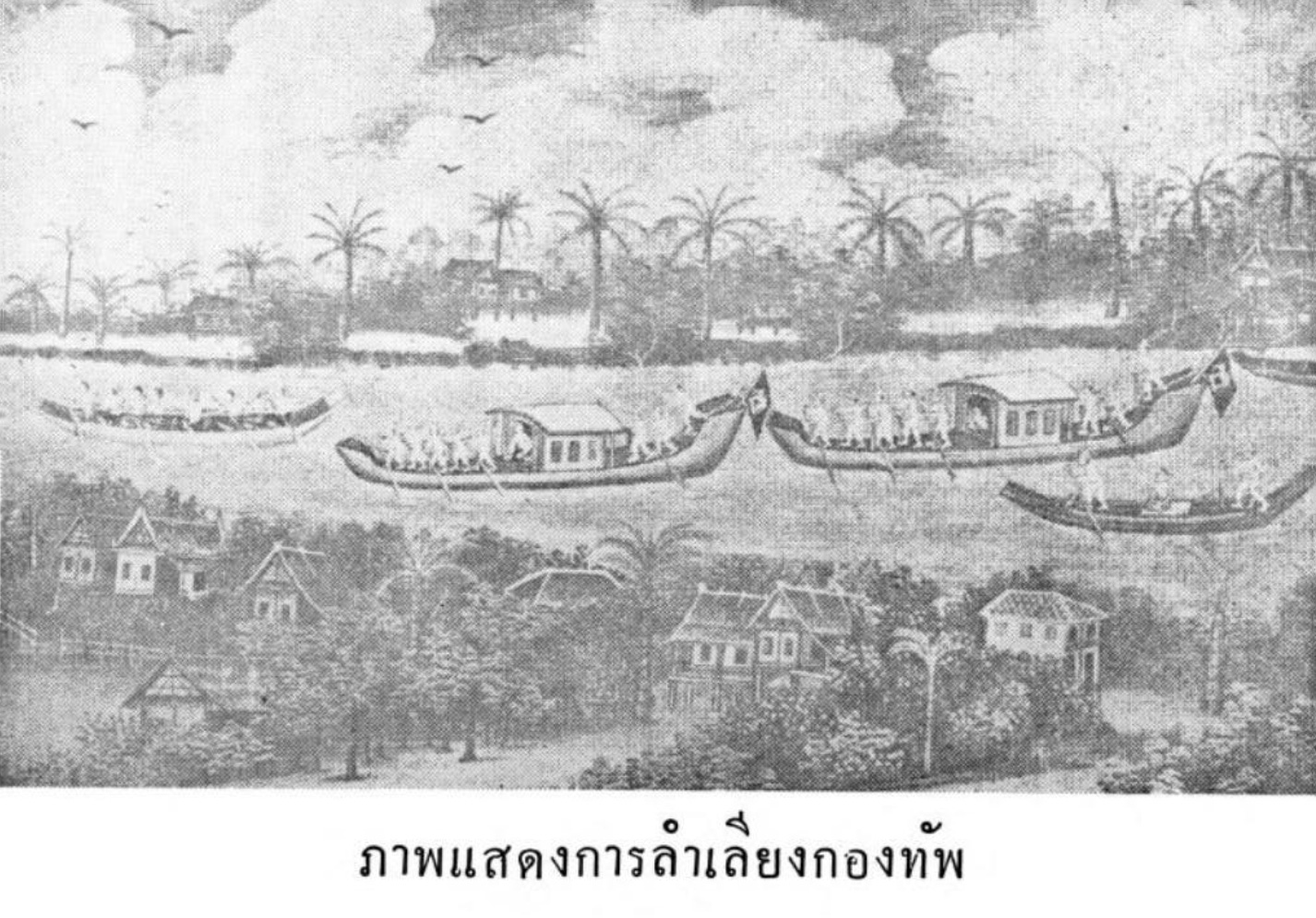
- Siamese and Vietnamese troops invasion in Battambang
Date	3 November 1840 – 1845
Location	Cambodia, Southern Vietnam
Result	Cambodia came under joint Siamese-Vietnamese suzerainty.; Semi-independent Cambodia (Tây Thành province) became a dual vassal under both Siam and Vietnam.

Belligerents
Nguyễn dynasty Pro-Nguyen Khmer forces	Rattanakosin Kingdom (Siam); Anti-Nguyen Khmer forces

Commanders and leaders
Emperor Thiệu Trị; Trương Minh Giảng; Lê Văn Đức; Phạm Văn Điển; Nguyễn Công Nhân; Nguyễn Công Trứ; Võ Văn Giải; Nguyễn Tri Phương; Nguyễn Tiến Lâm; Nguyễn Văn Hoàng; Doãn Uẩn; Tôn Thất Nghị; Former Cambodian queen, princes and ministers: Ang Mey; Ang Em; Chaofa Talaha (Lung)	King Rama III; Chao Phraya Bodindecha (Sing Sinhaseni); Kromma Khun Isaret-rangsant; Chao Phraya Nakhon Ratchasima Thong-in; Chao Phraya Yommaraj Bunnak; Phra Promborrirak; Chameun Waiworanat (Chuang Bunnag); Ang Duong

Units involved
Imperial Vietnamese Army	Siamese Royal Army

Strength
At the start of the war: 5,000 Vietnamese soldiers 1,600 Cham–Malay soldiers Total (1841): 6,600 1845 Vietnamese Dry season offensive: 20,000	35,000 Thai soldiers

Casualties and losses
Unknown	Unknown

The Siamese–Vietnamese War of 1840–1845 (Thai: อานามสยามยุทธ (พ.ศ. 2383 – พ.ศ. 2388), Vietnamese: Chiến tranh Việt–Xiêm (1840–1845), Khmer: សង្គ្រាមសៀម-យួន (១៨៤០-១៨៤៥)) was a military conflict between the Đại Nam, ruled by Emperor Minh Mạng and then Emperor Thiệu Trị, and the Kingdom of Siam, under the rule of Chakri King Nangklao.

In effort to pull Cambodia away from Siamese influence, King Ang Chan II of Cambodia allied with Vietnam during his conflict with Siam in 1812–1813, putting Cambodia under Vietnamese influence. Siam attempted to reclaim domination over Cambodia by sending Chaophraya Bodindecha to lead Siamese forces to invade Cambodia in late 1833 and continued offensives into Southern Vietnam but the Siamese were defeated by the Vietnamese at Vàm Nao in early 1834. Concurrent Cambodian uprising against Siamese incursion pushed the Siamese back all the way back to the Siamese base at Battambang in the Siam-controlled Northwestern Cambodia. As the pro-Vietnamese Cambodian king Ang Chan died in 1835 without any male heirs, the Vietnamese enthroned Princess Ang Mey as the puppet Queen Regnant of Cambodia under Vietnamese rule without any powers, while the Siamese had male candidates including Prince Ang Em and Prince Ang Duong, half-brothers of Ang Chan. In order to utilize Cambodia as defense against Siam, the Vietnamese Emperor Minh Mạng established the Tây Thành province or Trấn Tây province (Western Commandery) over Cambodia with Trương Minh Giảng as the Governor-General, annexing Cambodia into Vietnamese direct rule. Vietnam sought to politically and culturally integrate Cambodia into Vietnam, imposing administrative personnel, reforms, cultural mandates and assimilation policies. These Vietnamese policies on Cambodia, combined with the Vietnamese decision to dethrone and exile Queen Ang Mey to Saigon in 1840, bred resentment among the Cambodian Oknha nobility and the Khmer populace, resulting in the general Cambodian uprising against Vietnamese rule in September 1840.

The Siamese–Vietnamese War of 1840–1845 can be divided into three phases;

- First phase: Siamese Invasion of Cambodia (November 1840–February 1841); Taking opportunity of the Cambodian revolt against the Vietnamese Trấn Tây regime, the Siamese king Rama III or King Nangklao sent Chaophraya Bodindecha as the supreme commander to lead the multiethnic Northern Khmer–Lao–Siamese forces of 21,753 men to invade and reclaim control over Cambodia, diving into two routes from Battambang and Siemreap to attack Pursat and Kampong Thom, respectively. Trương Minh Giảng defeated the Siamese at Stoung and Chikraeng but Bodindecha struck a peace deal with the Vietnamese commander at Pursat, confusing the Vietnamese.

Kingdom-wide restive sentiments of the Khmers pushed the Vietnamese out of most places in Cambodia. The Vietnamese were restricted to the Phnom Penh Quatre Bras area, while the Khmers welcomed Prince Ang Duong, who was brought from Bangkok to Cambodia in 1841 by Bodindecha to rally Khmer support for Siam. The Siamese under Bodindecha pushed forward Ang Duang as the Siam-endorsed candidate to take control over most parts of and to establish Siamese domination over Cambodia. Death of Emperor Minh Mạng and ascension of the new Vietnamese Emperor Thiệu Trị in January 1841 marked the shift of the Vietnamese policies towards Cambodia. In effort to salvage Vietnamese rule in Cambodia, Trương Minh Giảng brought back Princess Ang Mey and Prince Ang Em (who had earlier defected from Siam to Vietnam in 1839) to Cambodia as the Vietnam-backed candidates to rally Khmer support but to no avail. The Vietnamese eventually decided to retreat from Cambodia in November 1841, ending the Trấn Tây province and ending the six-year period of direct Vietnamese rule over Cambodia. Trương Minh Giảng the Governor-General of Trấn Tây reportedly committed suicide upon the Vietnamese loss of Cambodia.

- Second phase: Siamese attack on Hà Tiên and Vĩnh Tế canal (January–April 1842); As Bodindecha had taken control over most parts of Cambodia, the Siamese king relayed a new mission to Bodindecha in Cambodia to fill up and destroy the Vietnamese Vĩnh Tế canal, which connected Châu Đốc to the Gulf of Siam via Hà Tiên. Ever since its completion in 1824, the Vĩnh Tế canal had been perceived by the Siamese court as a strategic threat as it allowed Vietnamese naval access to Gulf of Siam. In January 1842, Siamese king Nangklao sent his younger half-brother Prince Itsaret Rangsan, accompanied by Chuang Bunnag, to lead the Siamese naval forces of 9,000 men, including some Western-style square-rigged warships, from Bangkok to the attack the Vietnamese port of Hà Tiên in order to divert Vietnamese attention for Bodindecha to attack Vĩnh Tế canal, reaching Hà Tiên in March. Chaophraya Bodindecha at Phnom Penh also sent Chaophraya Yommaraj Bunnak and Ang Duong to lead the Khmer–Lao–Siamese forces of 11,900 men to attack Vĩnh Tế canal at the northern bank, where the Vietnamese had fortified. The Vietnamese, who had been focusing on suppressing the Khmer Krom uprisings in Southern Vietnam, were again caught off guard but were able to prevail over the invading Siamese. In April 1842, Vietnamese commanders Đoàn Văn Sách successfully repelled the Siamese naval attack on Hà Tiên and Phạm Văn Điển crushed the Khmer–Siamese at Vĩnh Tế canal in a surprise attack, during which thousands of Cambodians and the Siamese died – the most humiliating Siamese defeat since the Battle of Vàm Nao in 1834.

Vietnamese victory over the invading Siamese in 1842 turned the tide of war in favor of Vietnam and forced the Siamese into defensive position. Chaophraya Bodindecha the Siamese commander expected Vietnamese retaliatory attack but both the Siamese and the Vietnamese had been exhausted by the continuing conflicts as thousands died from disease and starvation in Cambodia in this period, resulting in the three years (1842–1845) of an undeclared truce between Siam and Vietnam in Cambodia. As the Siamese continued to occupy Cambodia, Bodindecha and Ang Duong constructed several fortresses in Southeastern Cambodia along the Mekong in preparation of a prospective Vietnamese invasion, while Vietnam contemplated a Cambodian–Siamese fallout, during which they would take the opportunity to reclaim Cambodia. The Khmers, however, saw Siamese rule as nearly oppressive as the Vietnamese rule, leading to formation of an anti-Siamese faction within Ang Duong's court. In early 1845, Chaophraya Bodindecha and the bulk of Siamese forces had to leave Cambodia due to the persisting rice shortage, exposing Ang Duong to Vietnamese threats. In May 1845, Ang Duong discovered an anti-Siamese rebellion plot and conducted a purge on the conspirators. A rebellion against Ang Duong broke out in Srey Santhor, which was quickly quelled.

- Third phase: Vietnamese invasion of Cambodia (July–December 1845); Nguyễn Văn Chương (Nguyễn Trí Phương) the governor of An Giang and Hà Tiên provinces saw the anti-Siamese uprising in Cambodia as the long-awaited opportunity for Vietnam to reclaim Cambodia. In July 1845, Nguyễn Văn Chương and his deputy Doãn Uẩn, with the consent of the Vietnamese Emperor Thiệu Trị, led the Vietnamese riparian fleet to invade and conquer the Ba Phnum area of Southeastern Cambodia. The Khmers were caught off guard as Ang Duong himself led the defenses but the Cambodian Mekong fortifications built earlier did not manage to resist the Vietnamese attack. Chaophraya Bodindecha had to lead Siamese armies to aid Ang Duong against the Vietnamese attack, this time with 40,000 men. The Vietnamese then went to seize Phnom Penh in September 1845 as Ang Duong had to retreat to Oudong. The Vietnamese fleet under Nguyễn Văn Chương and Doãn Uẩn pursued the Siamese further to attack Oudong, where Bodindecha resisted and repelled the Vietnamese assault. The Siamese and the Vietnamese again reached an uneasy stalemate in Cambodia. The Vietnamese kept attacking Oudong but the Siamese did not yield, whereas the Siamese managed to defend Oudong but the Vietnamese attack was persistent. As both sides became exhausted due to several years of continuous warfare in Cambodia, Siam and Vietnam pursued peace in December 1845.

The Siamese and the Vietnamese in Cambodia agreed to a peace deal in December 1845, in which Vietnam would accept Ang Duong the Siam-endorsed candidate for the Cambodian throne on the condition that Ang Duong would profess himself to be a vassal of both Siam and Vietnam in joint suzerainty. Despite the peace agreement, tension remained high in the whole 1846 year as both Siamese and Vietnamese monarchs were reluctant to accept the peace terms. By December 1846, Chaophraya Bodindecha realized the Siamese presence in Cambodia had become a desperate stand as the Vietnamese were assembling forces for a new attack. Bodindecha then had Ang Duong send diplomatic envoys to the Vietnamese imperial capital of Huế in January 1847 to pledge Ang Duong himself as a vassal of Vietnam. The Vietnamese held a Sinitic Confucian investiture ceremony of Ang Duong as Cao Miên quốc vương or King of Cambodia in Oudong in May 1847 and then withdrew from Cambodia, while the Siamese held an Indic Brahmanistic enthronement ceremony for Ang Duong in March 1848 and also withdrew from Cambodia. With Ang Duong accepted by both Siam and Vietnam as the King of Cambodia, intermittent wars that had been plaguing Cambodia, Siam and Vietnam for fifteen years since 1833 came to the end, securing peace in Cambodia for about a decade until another Cambodian dynastic conflict erupted again in 1861.

== Background ==
=== Siamese–Vietnamese conflicts over Cambodia ===
The once-powerful Khmer Kingdom during the 18th century became increasingly influenced by its eastern and western neighbors: Vietnam and Siam. Cambodian dynastic rivalries over the throne aggravated the conflicts as each side sought support from and manipulated by either Siam or Vietnam. In 1794, King Phuttha Yotfa Chulalok or King Rama I of Siam installed the youthful Ang Eng as the king of Cambodia under Siamese domination. On the same occasion, King Rama also carved Northwestern Cambodia, including Battambang and Siemreap, for Chaophraya Aphaiphubet, a pro-Siamese Cambodian minister, to govern under direct Siamese control. Thus, Northwestern region of Cambodia was annexed into Siam. King Ang Eng died prematurely (aged 22–23) in 1797, leaving his four sons Ang Chan, Ang Snguon, Ang Em and Ang Duong. Ang Chan was installed as the new king of Cambodia by Siam in 1806 but he became resentful of Siamese influence in Cambodia and approached Vietnam. Ang Chan refused to attend the funeral of the Siamese King Phuttha Yotfa in 1809, executing his pro-Siamese ministers and taking anti-Siamese stance.

In 1812, Prince Ang Snguon, Ang Chan's pro-Siamese younger brother, rebelled against Ang Chan. Siamese forces invaded Cambodia in 1812 in support of Ang Snguon and the panicked King Ang Chan fled to Cochinchina to take refuge at Saigon under Vietnamese protection. The Siamese burnt down the Cambodian royal capital of Oudong and returned. Princes Ang Em and Ang Duong, Ang Chan's other brothers, decided to join with Ang Snguon and went to Bangkok to be under Siamese custody. The Vietnamese Emperor Gia Long assigned Lê Văn Duyệt to restore Ang Chan to the Cambodian throne in 1813. This brought Cambodia under Vietnamese domination as Siam lost control over Cambodia and Ang Chan moved his seat to Phnom Penh for closer Vietnamese protection. Lê Văn Duyệt built a new citadel at Phnom Penh called Banteay Keav to be the new royal capital for Ang Chan. In 1819, Gia Long ordered the construction of Vĩnh Tế canal that connected Châu Đốc and Hà Tiên on the Cambodian–Vietnamese border, putting Cambodian people into the labor works. Siamese court at Bangkok was greatly alarmed by construction of this canal, suspecting that the canal was to facilitate mobilization of Vietnamese navy fleet into the Gulf of Siam, threatening Bangkok.

=== Siamese Invasion of Cambodia and Southern Vietnam (1833–1834) ===
Lê Văn Duyệt, who had been the viceroy of Cochinchina or Southern Vietnam and also held influences over Cambodia, died in 1832. Minh Mạng installed his officials to replace Lê Văn Duyệt in Cochinchina who soon found out that Lê Văn Duyệt had been exceptionally powerful and came up with accusations against the deceased minister, leading to political purge, punishments and executions. The body of Lê Văn Duyệt was exhumed from his grave and humiliated. Lê Văn Khôi, adopted son of Lê Văn Duyệt, arose in rebellion at Saigon against the Nguyen in 1833 in Lê Văn Khôi revolt. Minh Mạng sent his generals to subjugate the rebels in mid-1833 and the rebels then sought assistance from Siam.

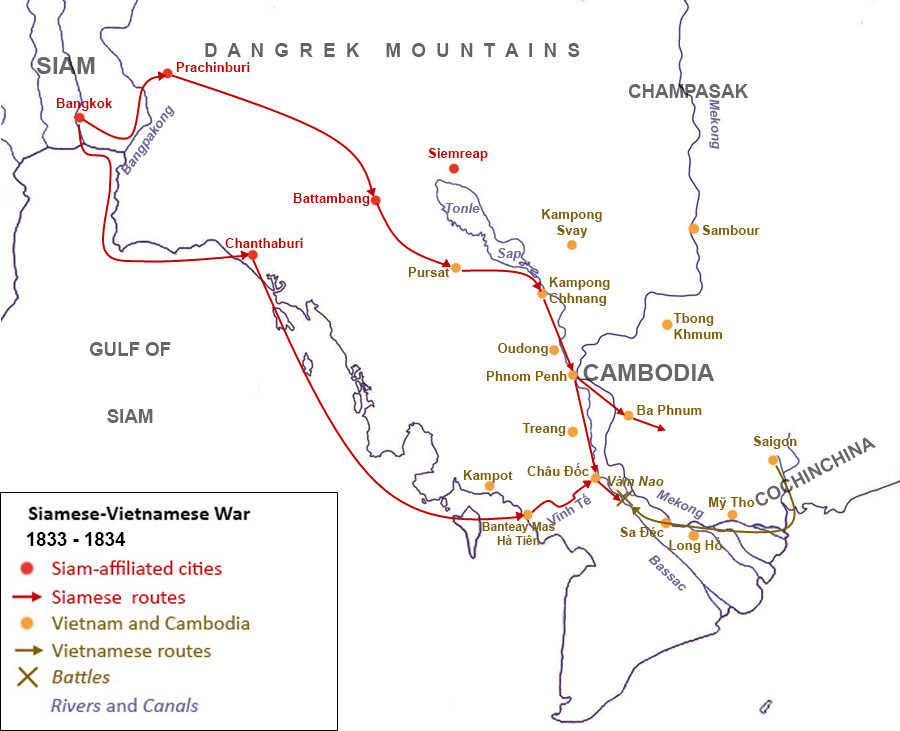
Siamese invasion of Cambodia and Southern Vietnam by land and sea from November 1833 to January 1834. The Siamese forces were defeated by the Vietnamese in the Battle of Vàm Nao in January–February 1834.

King Nangklao or King Rama III of Siamese Rattanakosin Kingdom, upon knowing of the rebellion at Saigon, took this opportunity to dismantle Vietnamese influence in Cambodia and to aid the Lê Văn Khôi rebellion at Saigon. In November 1833, the Siamese king sent his generals Chaophraya Bodindecha to lead the land armies of 40,000 men, bringing the Cambodian Princes Ang Em and Ang Duong with him, to invade Cambodia and Chaophraya Phrakhlang to lead the navy fleet of 10,000 men to attack the Vietnamese port of Hà Tiên. The Cambodian king Ang Chan fled from his court at Phnom Penh to take shelter at Vĩnh Long in Cochinchina as the Siamese seized the royal citadel of Banteay Keav at Phnom Penh, putting the pro-Siamese pretenders Ang Em and Ang Duong in Phnom Penh. The Siamese quickly took Hà Tiên, Châu Đốc and proceeded along the Bassac river invading Southern Vietnam, taking the Vietnamese by surprise. The Vietnamese Emperor Minh Mạng, focusing on the subjugation of the Lê Văn Khôi rebels at Saigon, had to allocate some of the troops led by Nguyễn Xuân and Trương Minh Giảng to face the invading Siamese.

Chaophraya Bodindecha allocated some forces under Chaophraya Nakhon Ratchasima and Phraya Ratchanikun to march by land towards Ba Phnum to attack Saigon, while Bodindecha himself joined Phrakhlang at Châu Đốc. The Siamese forces under Bodindecha and Phrakhlang sailed from Châu Đốc downstream the Bassac River, crossing the Vàm Nao canal into the Mekong heading towards Saigon, where the Siamese and the Vietnamese engaged in the Battle of Vàm Nao in January 1834. The Siamese were utterly defeated and retreated towards Cambodia, turning the tide of war in Vietnam's favor. The Cambodians under Oknha Chakrey Long and Yumreach Hu ambushed and inflicted guerilla attacks on the retreating Siamese, ambushing on the Siamese wandering army of Nakhon Ratchasima and Ratchanikun at Smaong in modern Prey Veng. In retaliation, Bodindecha ordered the destruction of the Banteay Keav citadel at Phnom Penh and the capture of Khmer people along the retreating route as war captives to make up for the Siamese defeat.

In February 1834, Bodindecha hold out at Pursat, while Phrakhlang retreated to Chanthaburi. Cambodian–Vietnamese forces under Nguyễn Xuân, Trương Minh Giảng and Oknha Chakrey Long capitalized the victory and pursued the Siamese to the edges of Cambodian territories. The Vietnamese paraded King Ang Chan of Cambodia, who had been taking refuge in Vĩnh Long, to return to Phnom Penh to resume rule. Bodindecha, Ang Em and Ang Duong eventually retreated to Battambang in April 1834, ending this ill-fated Siamese expedition into Cambodia and Southern Vietnam. Ang Chan rewarded his meritorious commanders Oknha Chakrey Long and Yumreach Hu by appointing them to the positions of Chauvea Tolaha (Prime Minister) and Samdech Chauponhea (Deputy Prime Minister), respectively. Ang Chan, upon his return to Phnom Penh, found his Banteay Keav residence, built by Lê Văn Duyệt for him in 1813, destroyed and burnt to the grounds by the Siamese. Ang Chan then built a temporary palace at Po Preah Bat opposite of Phnom Penh on Slaket island, where he died ten months later in January 1835.

=== Vietnamese annexation of Cambodia ===
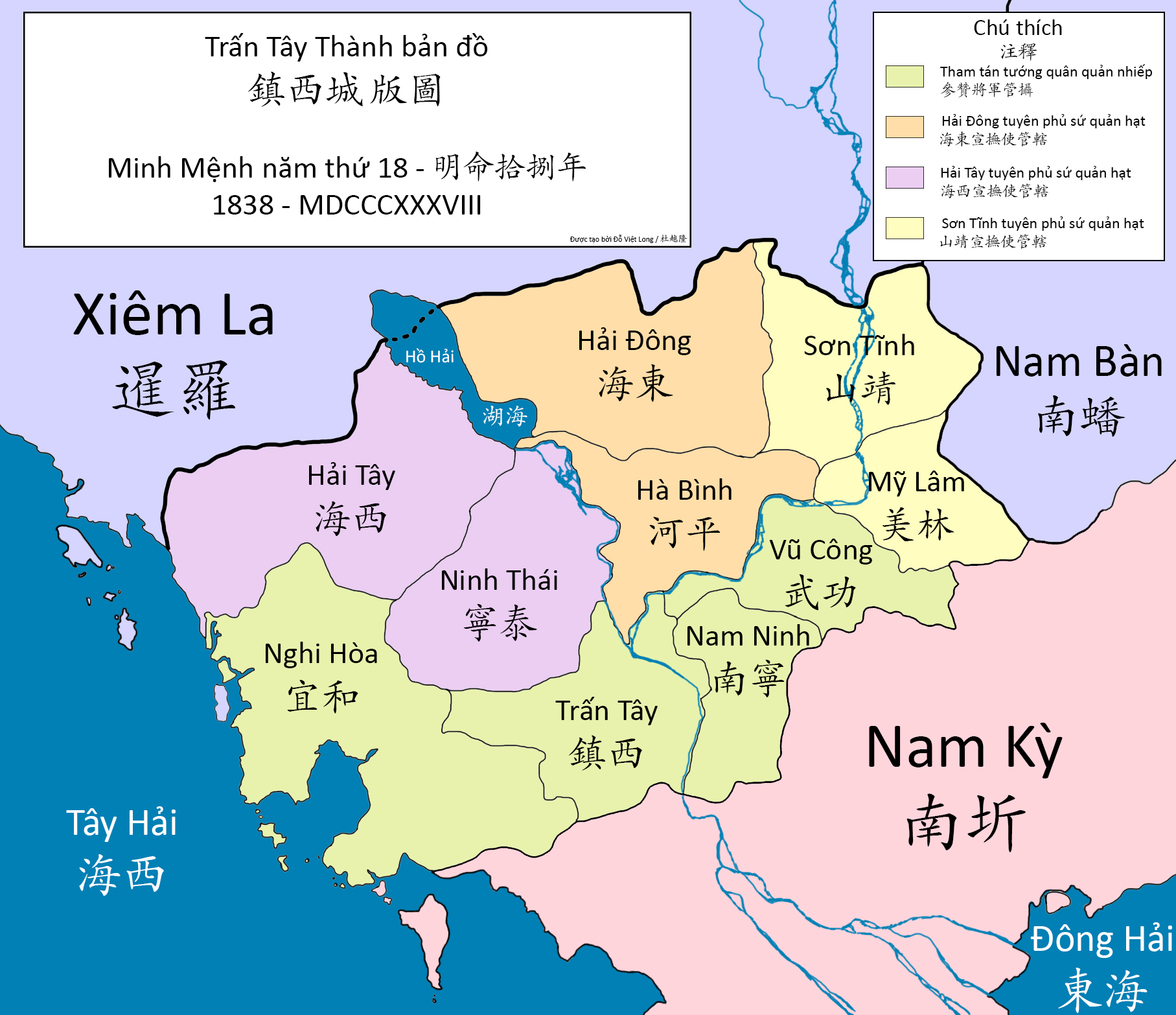
Map of Cambodia as Vietnam-occupied Trấn Tây Province

King Ang Chan of Cambodia died in January 1835, leaving no male heirs but four daughters; Princesses Ang Pen (Ang Pen's mother was Neak Neang Tep, daughter of Chaophraya Aphaiphubet the pro-Siamese Cambodian governor of Siam-controlled Battambang who had died in 1809.), Ang Mey, Ang Peou and Ang Snguon, born to different consorts of Ang Chan. Ang Chan's brothers Princes Ang Em and Ang Duong, who were Siam-endorsed candidates to the Cambodian throne, were under Siamese custody at Battambang. This left Vietnam with no male candidates to Cambodian kingship. In May 1835, Minh Mạng appointed the 20-year-old Cambodian princess Ang Mey as puppet Queen regnant of Cambodia with the title of Quận chúa (郡主) as the first and only historical female ruler in Cambodian history without any real powers. Minh Mạng deliberately passed over Princess Ang Pen or Ang Baen the eldest daughter of Ang Chan due to her connections with Siam. Other three princesses were given the title Huyện quân (縣君) or governors.

In November 1835, at the suggestion of Trương Minh Giảng, Emperor Minh Mạng created the Trấn Tây Province (鎮西) or Western Commandery over Cambodia, bringing Cambodia under direct Vietnamese rule and dividing Cambodia into thirty-three phủ or districts. Minh Mạng also appointed Trương Minh Giảng as Trấn Tây tướng quân (鎮西將軍, called Ong Tien Kun) as supreme Governor-General of Cambodia. As the Banteay Keav citadel of Phnom Penh, royal residence of Ang Chan, was destroyed by the invading Siamese in 1834, the Vietnamese built a new citadel called Trấn Tây in Phnom Penh to serve as the center of Vietnamese administration in Cambodia. However, Queen Ang Mey and her sisters stayed at the Po Preah Bat palace, the last residence of their father, at Slaket opposite of Phnom Penh on the river. Trấn Tây Cambodia had regional centers; Kampong Thom or Hải Đông (海東) to the east of Tonle Sap Lake, bordering the Siamese-controlled Siemreap, Pursat or Hải Tây (海西) to the southwest of Tonle Sap, bordering the Siam-controlled Battambang and Sambok or Sơn Tĩnh on the Mekong in Eastern Cambodia, bordering the Siam-controlled Xiengtaeng (Stung Treng) and the Champasak Kingdom.

Trương Minh Giảng brought 5,000 Vietnamese military men to Phnom Penh to occupy Cambodia and to be trained. Trương Minh Giảng the supreme Vietnamese minister in Cambodia posed himself as de facto ruler of Cambodia. Native Cambodian mandarins paid daily obeisance to Trương Minh Giảng. The Vietnamese Emperor Minh Mạng sought to politically and culturally integrate Cambodia into Vietnam. Trương Minh Giảng introduced the Sino-Vietnamese bureaucracy into Cambodia, superseding native Cambodian noble-aristocracy, which still existed but was deprived of actual administrative roles. Minh Mạng and Trương Minh Giảng also imposed ethnocultural assimilation, commanding Khmer people to adopt Vietnamese cultural practices including language, rituals, costume and hairstyle, wearing Vietnamese Khăn vấn turban, at the expense of Khmer cultural identity. The Vietnamese also conscripted Khmer people into construction of roads and infrastructures and into agricultural plantations to boost economic productivity, subjecting the Khmer people to forced labors and hardships.

In 1837, Oknha Dechu Ream the Cambodian governor of Kampong Svay rebelled against Vietnamese rule but was caught and executed. Next year, in February 1838, Snang Ey, a Cambodian official serving under Vietnamese bureaucracy, murdered the Vietnamese delegate in Kampong Thom or Hải Đông and rebelled against Vietnamese rule, rallying 1,000 Cambodians to massacre the Vietnamese people in the Kampong Svay–Kampong Thom area. Trương Minh Giảng sent Đoàn Văn Phú and Chauvea Tolaha Long the pro-Vietnamese Cambodian Prime Minister to march from Phnom Penh against Snang Ey, clashing with the rebels at Steung Trang and Kampong Siem. It took about a month for the Vietnamese to finally put down Snang Ey's rebellion in March. Snang Ey escaped north crossing the Tonle Repou River into the Siam-controlled Champasak Kingdom. Trương Minh Giảng then conducted a violent purge on Cambodian officialdom in Kampong Svay in retaliation. Many Cambodian officials of Kampong Svay were either executed or imprisoned. There were also Cambodian uprisings against Vietnam in Kampong Saom (Khai Biên) during 1837–1838.

=== Siamese preparations ===
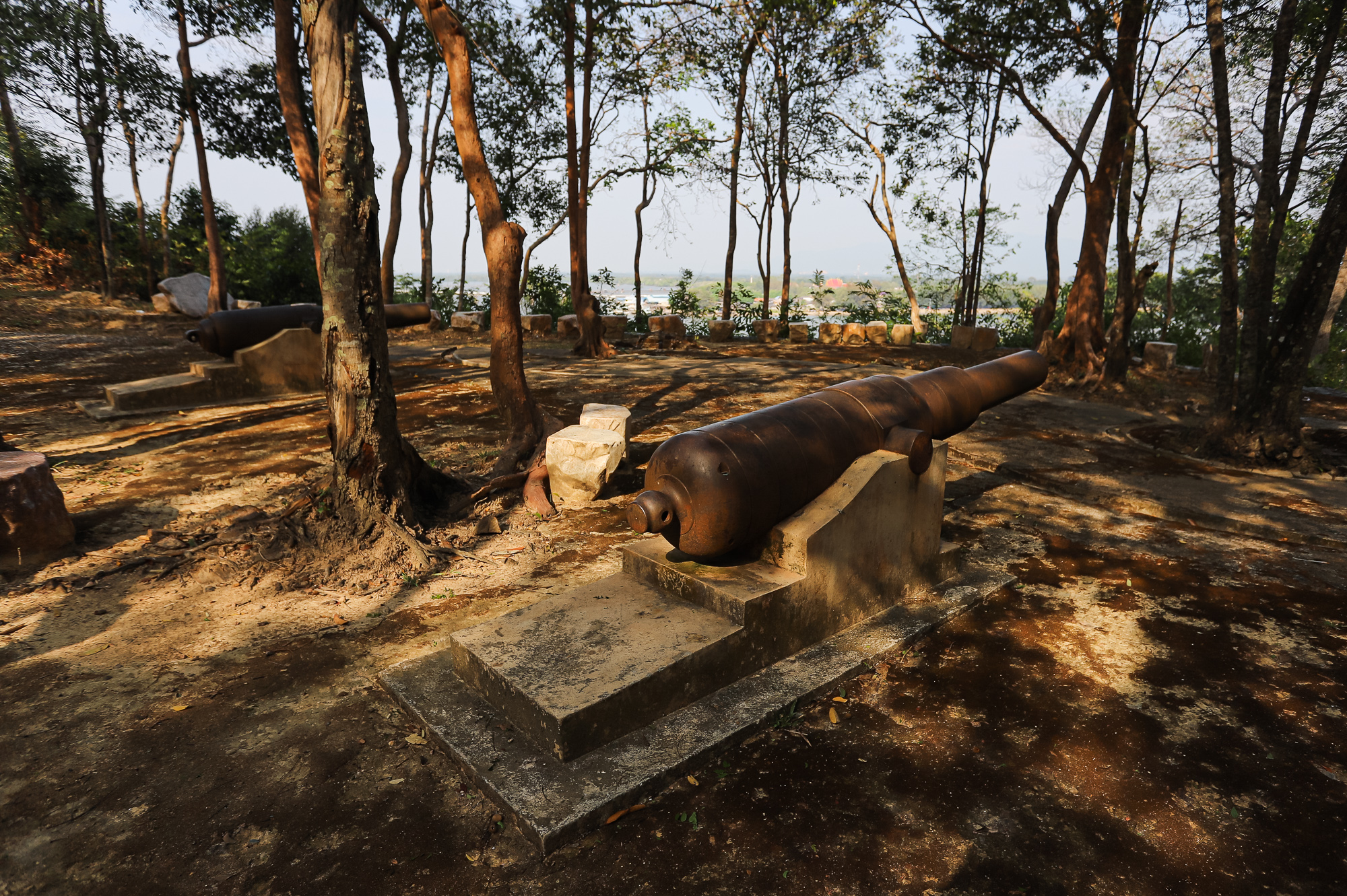
Phairiphinat Fort (Thai: ป้อมไพรีพินาศ) was one of the two forts built by Kham Bunnag at the mouth of Chanthaburi River in 1834 to defend Chanthaburi against possible Vietnamese attacks.

When the Siamese had retreated from Cambodia in early 1834, they anticipated a full-scale Vietnamese retaliatory attack. King Rama III or Nangklao ordered the construction of eighty Vietnamese-style fort-warships with forty of them stationing in Bangkok and another forty sent to guard Siamese coastal towns. King Rama ordered the renovation of Chachoengsao city walls and construction of a new fort called Khong Kraphan Fort (Thai: ป้อมคงกระพัน) at Phra Samut Chedi, Samut Prakarn in 1834. The Siamese king also sent Chaophraya Phrakhlang Dit Bunnag to fortify Chanthaburi on the Eastern Siamese coast in 1834 against possible Vietnamese incursions. Phrakhlang decided to move the city of Chanthaburi from its original riparian position five kilometers upland to a higher position for better defense and constructed the Noenwong Fort (Thai: ป้อมเนินวง) there. Phrakhlang assigned his son Chamuen Rachamat Kham Bunnag to construct two forts on both banks of the mouth of Chanthaburi River.

Another son of Phrakhlang, Chamuen Waiworanat Chuang Bunnag, who had been studying Western-style shipbuilding, constructed the first-ever native Siamese-made square-rigged masted vessel called Ariel at Chanthaburi in 1835, a small 300-ton brig, which was granted a Thai name by King Rama III as Klaew Klang Samut (Thai: แกล้วกลางสมุทร). Chuang Bunnag built another large 1,400-ton square-rigged ship called Conqueror (Rabinbuakaew Thai: ระบิลบัวแก้ว) at Chanthaburi in 1836. At Bangkok, Prince Kromma Khun Itsaret Rangsan, younger half-brother of King Rama III, who took interest in Western shipbuilding, also built many vessels including Fairy (Phuttha-amnat Thai: พุทธอำนาจ, a barque), Sir Walter Scott (Ratcharit Thai: ราชฤทธิ์, a barque) and Lion (Udomdet Thai: อุดมเดช, a brig), assisted by Chuang Bunnag, who built another vessel called Victory (Witthayakhom Thai: วิทยาคม). British seafarers were hired to be the captains of these vessels.

With the death of Ang Chan in early 1835 and the advent of Vietnamese rule, a group of Cambodian nobles sent a secret letter to Bangkok, urging the return of Cambodian princes Ang Em and Ang Duong. Siam, however, had not yet recovered from its losses to conduct any new expeditions into Cambodia. Siamese obliteration of the Vientiane Kingdom in aftermath of Anouvong's uprising against Siam in 1826–1828 allowed Siam to take full control over manpower conscription of Lao and Northern Khmer people in Northeastern Siam. There had been also a great population transfer of Lao people from the east bank of Mekong to the west side through forced resettlements, leading to an increase in population of Khorat Plateau. In January 1837, King Rama III ordered a general census on manpower availability in Northeastern Siam in order to utilize the manpower forces for prospective campaigns against Cambodia and Vietnam. Lack of provisions and food resources had been issues since the Siamese forces operated in Cambodia far from home base. King Rama then had Phraya Ratchasuphawadi Ng To establish supply line at Prachinburi and Krabinburi on the way to Cambodia.

Siam also strengthened Battambang as its own political base. When Chaophraya Bodindecha went to Battambang in February 1837, he found the city walls of the old Battambang city in disrepair. Bodindecha then proposed to the king to move the Battambang city from Baset to the present-day site on the Sangkae River, constructing a new city-fort there. 2,000 Lao-Siamese men from Nakhon Ratchasima, 6,405 Lao men from Northeastern Siam and 1,474 Lao-Siamese men from Nakhon Nayok, Prachantakham and Krabinburi were conscripted to build the new Battambang city. Bodindecha then went on to conduct manpower survey in Northeastern Siam, reporting up to 80,000 Lao and Northern Khmer available men. In February 1839, Phraya Ratchasuphawadi was sent to fortify the Siam-controlled Siemreap town.

=== Defection of Ang Em to Vietnam ===
Phraya Aphaiphubet Chet joined Chaophraya Bodindecha on the campaign to invade Cambodia in 1833 and when Chet returned to Battambang in 1834, he died. King Nangklao of Siam appointed the Cambodian Prince Ang Em as the governor of Siam-controlled Battambang to rally Khmer people in Cambodia to his side. Phraya Palat Ros was made vice-governor of Battambang under Ang Em. Ang Duong was also made governor of Mongkolborey, another town in Northwestern Cambodia. Trương Minh Giảng the Vietnamese Governor-General of Cambodia sent a secret letter to Ang Em in Battambang, urging Ang Em to defect to Vietnamese side so that Trương Minh Giảng would make him King of Cambodia. Chaovea Tolaha Long the Cambodian Prime Minister also sent a separate secret letter to Ang Duong at Mongkolborey, urging Ang Duong to defect from Siam to Cambodia. These secret endeavors led to a conflict between the princely brothers Ang Em and Ang Duong. Phraya Palat Ros the Battambang vice-governor took Ang Em's side, while Phra Phithakbodin Som, Chet's son, took Ang Duong's side.

When Chaophraya Bodindecha finished constructing the new Battambang city and conducting the census of Northeastern Siam, he returned to Bangkok in 1838, plunging Battambang into political conflicts. Ang Duong and Phra Phiithakbodin Som planned a coup to seize power in Battambang in November 1838 but Phraya Palat Ros and Ang Em's clique warned Bangkok beforehand, resulting in the arrest of Ang Duong to Bangkok, where he was put in prison but was later released to be under house arrest instead.

One year after Ang Duong's abortive plot, it was Ang Em's turn to arise. Ang Em had been the forefront pro-Siamese candidate to the Cambodian throne for about twenty years but he became disappointed with Siamese failures to actually enthrone him, becoming a mere Battambang governor. On 24 December 1839, Ang Em seized power in Battambang, capturing Phraya Palat Ros and other Cambodian Siamese officials in Battambang. On that night, Ang Em carried off about half of the Battambang inhabitants and his captive officials, numbering around 6,000 to 8,000 people, on hundreds of barge vessels to Tonle Sap Lake to surrender to the Vietnamese at Pursat in January 1840. The Vietnamese Emperor Minh Mạng, however, had no intention of restoring Cambodian monarchy as his ultimate goal was to integrate Cambodia politically and culturally into Vietnam. Minh Mạng ordered Trương Minh Giảng to arrest Ang Em and Phraya Palat Ros, sending them from Phnom Penh straight to Huế, where Phraya Palat Ros was supposedly executed and Ang Em was imprisoned. Cambodian Battambang inhabitants brought by Ang Em were resettled in towns near Pursat including Krakor, Krang, Khlong, Baribour and Rolea B'ier, some went further to be resettled in Saigon or Vĩnh Long in Southern Vietnam. Ang Em's mother, Neak Neang Ros, who was also mother of Ang Duong and Ang Em's son Ang Phim were put in custody in Saigon.

Chaophraya Bodindecha at Bangkok was informed about this alarming incident and hurriedly took off in January 1840 with Siamese armies to Battambang. Bodindecha found Battambang to be depleted in food and manpower, leaving Battambang, which had been serving as the buffer between Cambodia and Central Siam, weakened and vulnerable to Cambodian and Vietnamese attacks. Arrival of 4,300 Northern Khmer men from Khukhan, Surin, Sangkha and Sisaket did not help because Bodindecha had no food to feed them in Battambang so Bodindecha had to send Northern Khmer and Siamese forces out to guard at Siemreap, Moung Ruessei and Kampong Preah instead while Bodindecha was replinishing Battambang's resources. Bodindecha made Phra Phithakbodin Som the interim governor of Battambang, while Phra Narinyotha Nong was made interim vice-governor.

Meanwhile, Trương Minh Giảng urged the Cambodian ministers Chauvea Tolaha Long, Samdech Chauponhea Hu and Oknha Kralahom to lead Cambodian forces to attack and reclaim Battambang in its weakened state. However, the Cambodian ministers refused, saying that the Siamese had already been vigilant after Ang Em's defection and their chance of victory was low. Trương Minh Giảng was also not keen on committing Vietnamese troops to invade Battambang or else it would incur another major Siamese–Vietnamese war.

=== Cambodian uprising against Vietnam ===
In early 1840, Emperor Minh Mạng imposed tighter control on Cambodia and the Trấn Tây Province. Minh Mạng ordered the general census on Cambodia, which reported up to 40,000 men as available manpower in Cambodia. However, Minh Mạng soon discovered that the Cambodians underreported the number by 15,000 men so Minh Mạng punished the top three Cambodian ministers Chauvea Tolaha Long, Samdech Chauponhea Hu and Oknha Kralahom, exiling them to Northern Vietnam, also for their disobedience and incompetency. Minh Mạng took further step of integration of Cambodia by reducing the status of Cambodian monarchy, demoting Queen Regnant Ang Mey of Cambodia to "Princess of Mỹ Lâm" in July 1840, also demoting the titles of three other Cambodian princesses. The four Cambodian princesses had been staying at Po Preah Bat temporary palace at Slaket opposite of Phnom Penh on the river, which was the last residence of their father Ang Chan before his death in 1835. In August 1840, Trương Minh Giảng discovered that the eldest princess Ang Pen, who had earlier been surpassed from taking the throne due to her strong connection with Siam, had been in secret communications with her mother Neak Neang Tep and her uncle Preah Angkev Ma (both were children of Chaophraya Aphaiphubet Baen) at Battambang. Preah Angkev Ma had sent a secret letter to his niece Princess Ang Pen, urging her to escape to join her mother at Battambang.

Minh Mạng appointed Lê Văn Đức to be Khâm sai đại thần (欽差大臣) or Imperial Envoy to Trấn Tây Cambodia in July 1840. When Lê Văn Đức arrived in Phnom Penh in August, Trương Minh Giảng and Lê Văn Đức introduced sweeping reforms in Cambodia that practically obliterated any roles and powers of the Cambodian officials. Cambodian administrative seals were seized, replaced by Vietnamese ones. On 24 August 1840, Trương Minh Giảng held a banquet for Lê Văn Đức at his residence in the Trấn Tây citadel, which the Cambodian Oknhas and the four Khmer princesses were forced to attend. During the banquet, Trương Minh Giảng made a shocking declaration that the pro-Siamese Princess Ang Pen was planning to escape to Battambang so Ang Pen would be arrested and the three remaining princesses Ang Mey, Ang Peou and Ang Sngoun were to be deported to Saigon. As the three princesses, along with the Cambodian royal regalia including the Royal Sword Preah Khan Reach, were carried off to Saigon, Ang Pen was found guilty of sedition to Vietnam and was secretly taken to be executed by drowning in the Mekong at Vĩnh Long. These events terrified and angered the Khmers, who were dissatisfied with Vietnamese punishment of their royalty. Absence of Cambodian monarchy undermined the legitimacy of the Cambodian nobility themselves.

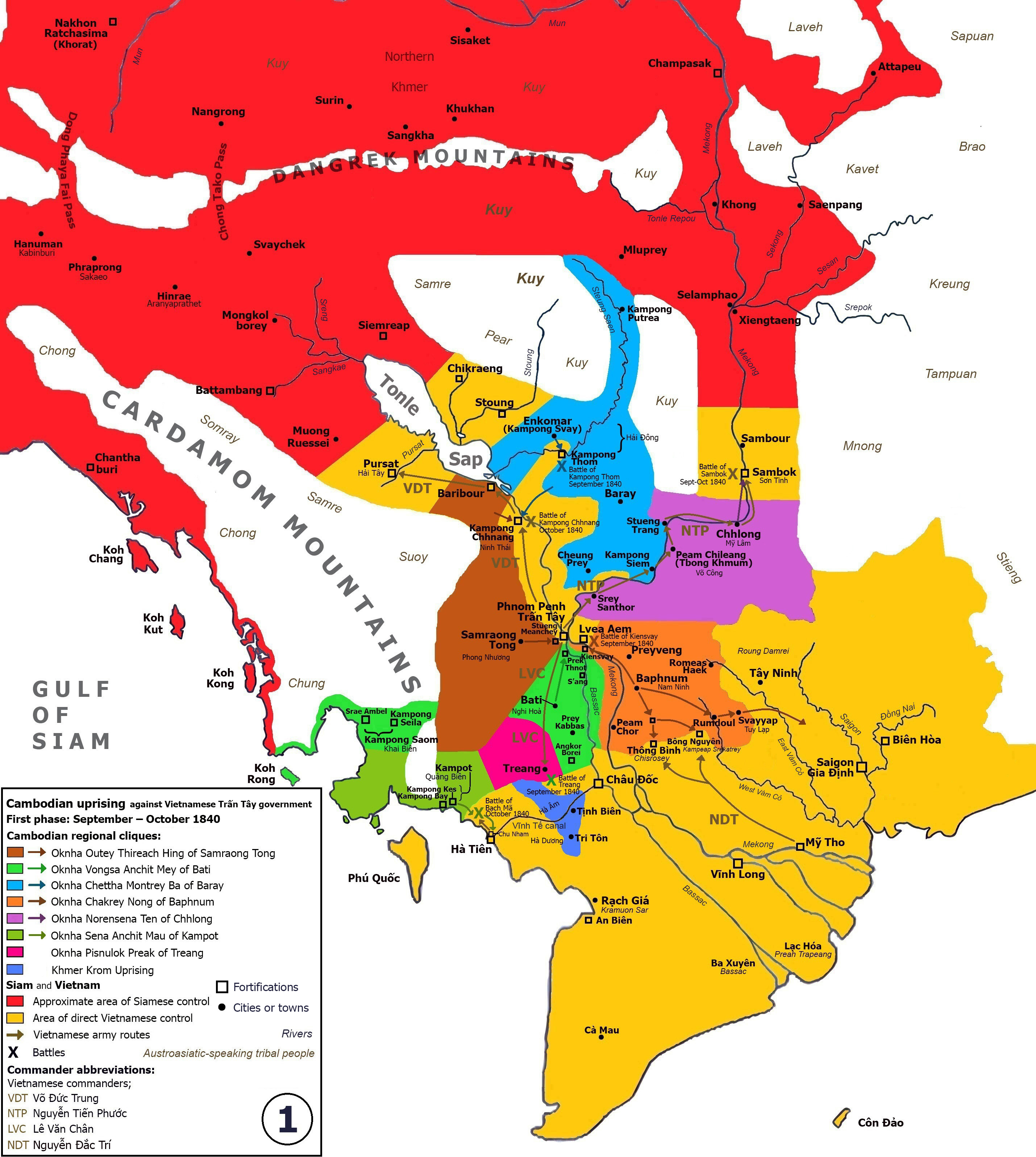
Cambodian uprising against Trấn Tây government; September–October 1840 Details about Cambodian regional cliques taken from Thai Archives of the Vietnamese army during the reign of Rama III (in Thai). Cambodian regional cliques: Oknha Outey Thireach Hing of Samraong Tong Oknha Vongsa Anchit Mey of Bati Oknha Chettha Montrey Ba of Baray Oknha Chakrey Nong of Ba Phnum Oknha Norensena Ten of Chhlong Khmer Krom uprising in Tịnh Biên and Thất Sơn Mountains

After five years of Vietnamese direct rule on Cambodia as the Trấn Tây province since 1835, the Khmers, who resented the Vietnamese for the forced labors, ethnocultural assimilation and treatment of Cambodian royalty, all of which undermined Khmer identity and culture, eventually arose and rebelled against the Vietnamese rule. In early September 1840, Oknha Outey Thireach Hing the Cambodian governor of Samraong Tong and Oknha Vongsa Anchit Mey the governor of Bati rebelled to the west of Phnom Penh, initiating the kingdom-wide anti-Vietnamese movement. Cambodia descended into anarchy, with many local warlords murdering the Vietnamese immigrants in their areas and establishing themselves in several cliques. Anti-Vietnamese Khmer warlord cliques included;

- Oknha Outey Thireach Hing of Samraong Tong and Oknha Vongsa Anchit Mey of Bati established their power to the west of Phnom Penh and lynched the Vietnamese in the area.
- The Siam-backed Oknha Chet of Baray rallied the Khmers of the whole Kampong Svay and Baray area to arise and lynch the Vietnamese people in the area with close collaboration with Siam.
- Oknha Reachea Dechea Nong declared himself a Chakrey or War Minister, collaborating with Oknha Thommeadecho Meas the governor of Ba Phnum, establishing himself at Kien Svay, taking control and lynching the Vietnamese of the whole area to the southeast of Phnom Penh.
- Oknha Sena Anchit Mau the governor of Kampot seized the Vietnamese fort of Kampong Bay and lynched the Vietnamese in the towns. Oknha Mau sent Khmer forces to attack Hà Tiên itself in October 1840, inflicting casualties on the Vietnamese. However, the Vietnamese eventually retook control of Kampot, pushing out Oknha Mau from his area.
- In Eastern Cambodia, in the Mekong region, Oknha Norensena Ten and Oknha Archun Kong the governor of Tbong Khmum established their headquarter at Chhloung to the northeast of Phnom Penh and attacked the Vietnamese Sambok (Sơn Tĩnh) citadel.

Also in September 1840, Oknha Surkealok Muk the Cambodian governor of Pursat or Hải Tây defected to Chaophraya Bodindecha at Battambang, asking for Siamese help to end the Vietnamese rule. From Phnom Penh, Trương Minh Giảng sent Cambodian–Vietnamese forces to put down these rebelling Khmer warlords but to no avail. The Khmers inflicted guerilla tactics on the Vietnamese, avoiding open battles and embracing the "hit-and-run" tactic, ambushing and retreating into the dense forests – the same tactic that the Cambodians had previously done to the retreating Siamese in early 1834. Upon hearing the news of general Cambodian uprising against Vietnamese rule, the Vietnamese Emperor Minh Mạng became so angry that "his hair stood upward". Facing widespread lynching spree from the Cambodians, the Vietnamese officials and immigrants in Cambodia all retreated into their administrative centers at Phnom Penh, Pursat and Sambok. In early November 1840, the Cambodian Oknhas of Southwestern Cambodia including Oknha Hing of Samraong Tong, Oknha Mey of Bati and Oknha Ton of Prey Kabbas sent their forces to station on the outskirts of Phnom Penh to enclose the Trấn Tây citadel.

The Vietnamese in Trấn Tây faced manpower shortage problem as they could only rely on the Vietnamese and few loyal Cambodians to fight for them. Trương Minh Giảng asked Emperor Minh Mạng for more troops to suppress this Khmer rebellion. Minh Mạng ordered mobilization of 10,000 Southern Vietnamese men from An Giang (Châu Đốc), Vĩnh Long (Vĩnh Long), Định Tường (Mỹ Tho) and Gia Định (Saigon) into Cambodia. As Oknha Surkealok Muk the Khmer governor of Pursat had defected to the Siamese at Battambang, Trương Minh Giảng sent Đề Đốc commander Võ Đức Trung to bring forces from Phnom Penh to take control of Pursat. Even though the Cambodians were enclosing on Phnom Penh, they did loosely, allowing the Vietnamese to move freely from Phnom Penh to other parts of Cambodia.

== Siamese Invasion of Cambodia: November 1840–January 1841 ==
Siamese Invasion of Cambodia (1840–1841)
- Part of Siamese–Vietnamese wars
Date	3 November 1840 – 14 January 1841
Location	Cambodia: Kampong Thom and Pursat

Belligerents
Rattanakosin Kingdom (Siam)	Nguyễn dynasty (Vietnam)

Commanders and leaders
Pursat front Chaophraya Bodindecha; Chaophraya Nakhon Ratchasima Thong-in; Phra Phirenthorathep Kham; Phra Phromborirak Kaew; Kampong Thom front Phraya Ratchanikun Suea; Phraya Aphai Songkhram; Luang Raksathep	Kampong Thom front Trương Minh Giảng; Lê Văn Đức; Bùi Công Huyên; Võ Viết Tuấn †; Đoàn Văn Sách; Nguyễn Công Nhàn; Pursat front Võ Đức Trung; Nguyễn Song Thành; Tôn Thất Quý

Units involved
Northern Khmer-Lao-Siamese ethnic levies	Imperial Vietnamese Army; Trấn Tây forces Nam Kỳ (Cochinchinese) regiments

Strength
Northern Khmer-Lao-Siamese multiethnic forces 21,753 men	Trấn Tây citadel (Thai estimate); 20,000 men Gia Định regiment 1,300 men Bình Định regiment 3,100 men

=== Siamese Offensives on Pursat and Kampong Thom ===
Earlier in September 1840, Oknha Chet a Khmer mandarin in Baray and Oknha Decho Ros the Khmer governor of Kampong Svay, supported by the Siamese supreme commander Chaophraya Bodindecha at Battambang, rallied the Khmer people of Kampong Svay–Kampong Thom or Hải Đông area to the east of Tonle Sap Lake to rebel against Vietnamese rule and lynch Vietnamese immigrants in the area, spanning from Kampong Svay, Baray, Cheung Prey, Kampong Siem and Steung Trang. The Vietnamese were restricted to Kampong Thom, the Vietnamese headquarter about fifteen kilometers to the southeast of Kampong Svay on the Steung Saen River. Oknha Chet and Oknha Decho led Khmer forces to attack the Vietnamese-held Kampong Thom. Trần Văn Thông the Tuyên phủ governor of Kampong Thom and Lãnh binh commander Hoàng Phước Lợi defended their town and repelled the Khmers. As the Khmers were retreating, the Vietnamese commander Hoàng Phước Lợi came out to pursue the Khmers but Oknha Chet ambushed the Vietnamese, killing Hoàng Phước Lợi.

Uprising of Oknha Chet and Oknha Decho Ros in Kampong Svay district facilitated Siamese advance into the area. As the Southern Cambodian Oknhas were closing on Trấn Tây citadel in Phnom Penh in early November 1840, Chaophraya Bodindecha took this opportunity to stage offensives into Cambodia to reassert Siamese influence, six years after Siamese retreat from failed campaign in Cambodia in 1834. On 3 November 1840, Chaophraya Bodindecha sent Phraya Ratchanikun to bring Lao and Northern Khmer forces of 13,000 men from Siemreap to march along the northeastern shores of Tonle Sap Lake into the Kampong Svay–Kampong Thom district to support the rebelling Khmer Oknhas. However, the Siamese invasion route was blocked by two Vietnamese fortresses at Stoung and Chikreang.

On 10 November 1840, Chaophraya Bodindecha the Siamese top commander and Phra Narinyotha Nong the vice-governor of Battambang sent letters to the Southern Cambodian Oknhas, urging them to attack the Vietnamese. This move made the Oknhas aware of potential Siamese support to their anti-Vietnamese cause. On November 17, the Oknhas wrote eighteen flattering letters to Bodindecha, requesting Siam to release the pro-Siamese Cambodian prince Ang Duong, who had been under house arrest in Bangkok for his failed rebellion attempt in 1838, to be their leader. Oknha Outey Thireach Hing of Samraong Tong professed himself to be a Siamese subject, lamenting that his movement lacked a unified leader. Oknha Mau of Kampot complained his lack of weaponry in resisting the Vietnamese attacks from Hà Tiên. Oknha Vongsa Anchit Mey of Bati expressed his wish that Cambodia would return to the days of King Ang Eng and the regent Tolaha Pok in the 1790s, when Siam dominated Cambodia. The Oknhas chose Oknha Surkealok Muk of Pursat and Oknha Vibolreach Long as their representatives to deliver their letters to Bodindecha.

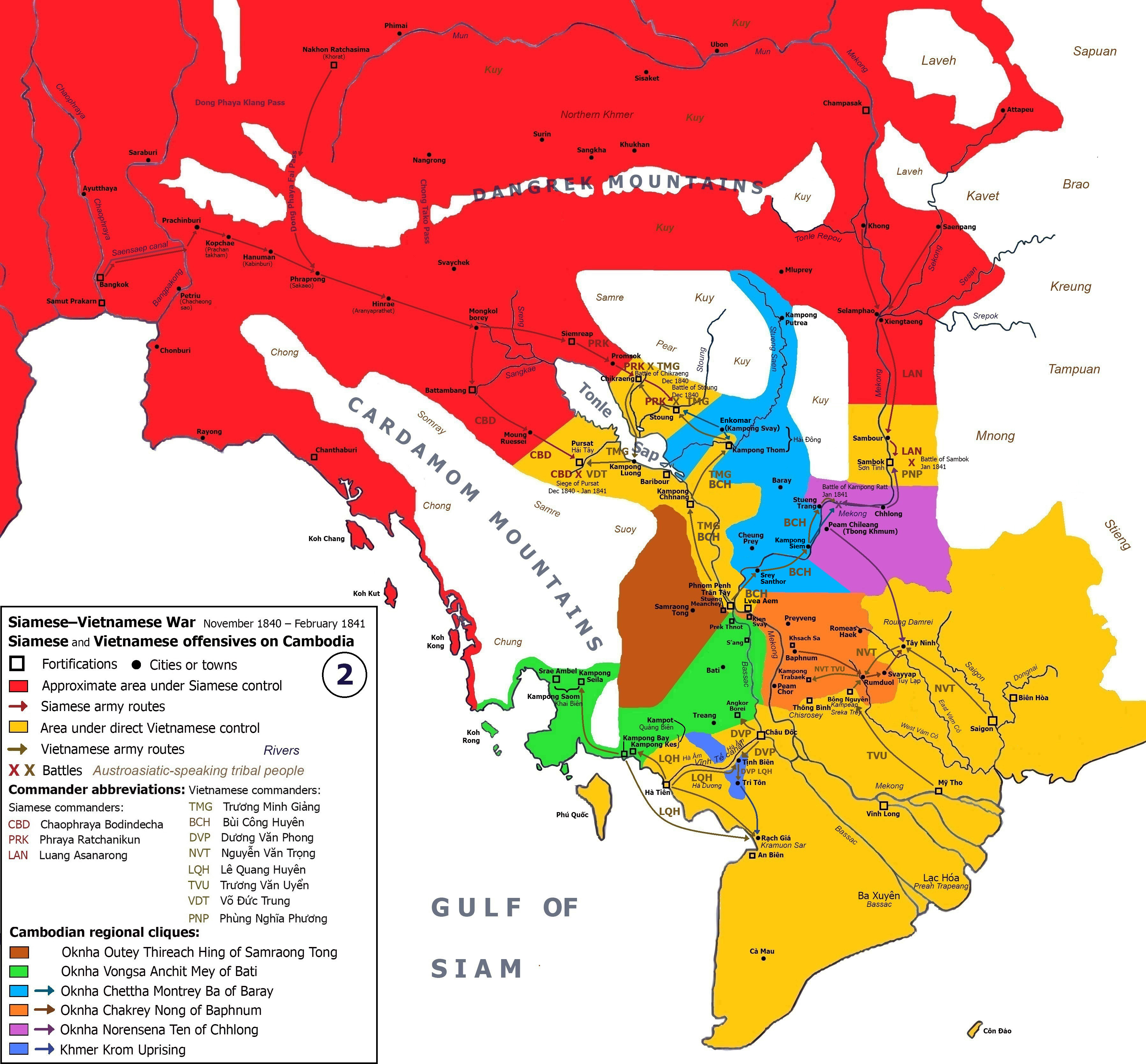
Siamese offensives against the Vietnamese in Cambodia at Pursat and Kampong Thom (November 1840 – January 1841) in order to reclaim control over Cambodia from Vietnam; Red depicts area of Siamese control and Siamese army routes. Yellow depicts area of Vietnamese control and Vietnamese army routes. Various colors depict Cambodian regional cliques.

Chaophraya Bodindecha the Samuha Nayok or Prime Minister of Northern Siam and his brother-in-law Chaophraya Nakhon Ratchasima Thong-in the governor of Nakhon Ratchasima had been in Battambang gathering Lao, Northern Khmer and Siamese men to invade Cambodia. On 16 November 1840, Bodindecha sent out Phra Phirenthorathep Kham, son of the Nakhon Ratchasima governor, to lead 2,788 Lao men to the east to attack the Vietnamese-held Pursat or Hải Tây, where the Vietnamese commander Võ Đức Trung was guarding. On November 20, Bodindecha sent his own son Phra Phromborirak Kaew and his brother-in-law the Nakhon Ratchasima governor to march 2,445 Lao and Siamese men hailed from Nakhon Ratchasima to attack Pursat. Finally, on 21 November 1840, Bodindecha marched his own main armies of 3,520 men to Pursat, where Bodindecha received eighteen letters from the Oknhas requesting for Ang Duong. These letters from the Oknhas assured Chaophraya Bodindecha of local Cambodian support of Siamese advances.

=== Kampong Thom front: Chikraeng and Stoung ===
From Siemreap, the Lao–Siamese forces under Phraya Ratchanikun had to go through the Vietnamese forts of Chikraeng (Chi Trinh) and then Stoung (Sa Tôn) in order to reach Kampong Svay and Kampong Thom. Stoung was guarded by the Vietnamese Phó Lãnh binh commander Đoàn Văn Sách, who sent Nguyễn Công Nhàn to guard Chikraeng. Chikraeng was the frontline citadel against the incoming Siamese forces from Siemreap. In November 1840, Phraya Ratchanikun attacked Chikraeng. The Siamese built stockades around the Chikraeng fort and piled up earthen mounds on four sides surrounding Chikraeng higher than the city walls. The Siamese then placed cannons onto the top of the earthen mounds to intensely fire into the inside of the Chikraeng town, inflicting casualties on the Vietnamese. The Vietnamese had to dig trenches to avoid Siamese grapeshots. Moreover, the Siamese built two forts on the two sides of the river of Chikraeng and connected both forts with wooden stakes on the river to prevent the Vietnamese from leaving by water and to prevent access from outside. With Nguyễn Công Nhàn and his 200 men in Chikraeng in critical situation, Đoàn Văn Sách brought relief forces of 370 men from Stoung to Chikraeng but was blocked by the Siamese obstacle on the river. Đoàn Văn Sách got through the Siamese obstacle by attacking their two forts at once and the cut down the stakes on the river. The Siamese retreated upon arrival of supporting troops of Đoàn Văn Sách.

Even though they managed to repel Siamese attack on Chikraeng, Đoàn Văn Sách and Nguyễn Công Nhàn realized that they could not hold Chikraeng for long so they abandoned Chikraeng to the Siamese and retreated to Stoung. Đoàn Văn Sách assigned Nguyễn Công Nhàn with 1,000 men to guard Stoung, while Đoàn Văn Sách himself went to Kampong Thom. Phraya Ratchanikun and the Siamese then occupied Chikraeng. Vietnamese Emperor Minh Mạng praised Đoàn Văn Sách and Nguyễn Công Nhàn for their victory, while also criticizing the Vietnamese commissioners in Phnom Penh for their inaction at the same time. In early December 1840, Trương Minh Giảng sent Võ Viết Tuấn to bring 1,300 Cochinchinese men from Saigon to face the Siamese at Stoung. At Stoung, Võ Viết Tuấn met with two Siamese forts full of cannons on the walls. Siamese cannons and guns fired on the Vietnamese like rain, killing Võ Viết Tuấn and inflicting heavy casualties.

Defeat and death of Võ Viết Tuấn made Trương Minh Giảng consider Siamese advance at Kampong Thom front to be a serious threat. Trương Minh Giảng decided to focus on repelling the Siamese from Stoung. In December 1840, 3,100 Vietnamese men came from Bình Định province to Phnom Penh help Trương Minh Giảng. Trương Minh Giảng then utilized this whole guard to face the Siamese at Stoung;

- Trương Minh Giảng the Governor-General of Trấn Tây and his deputy Lê Văn Đức took 2,600 men to repel the Siamese at Stoung as vanguard
- Bùi Công Huyên the Tổng đốc Long Tường or governor of Vĩnh Long and Định Tường provinces took 1,200 men to follow as rearguard
- 1,300 men were left to guard the Trấn Tây citadel in Phnom Penh under Doãn Uẩn.

When Trương Minh Giảng, Lê Văn Đức and Bùi Công Huyên reached the Tonle Sap Lake with their forces, they were informed that the Siamese were also attacking Pursat. Trương Minh Giảng decided that they should leave the Pursat front to Võ Đức Trung for then as the Kampong Thom front was in more critical situation – the decision that drew criticism from Minh Mạng, who suggested that they should spread out to assist both Pursat and Kampong Thom fronts. Decision of Trương Minh Giảng not to care about Pursat would later lead to his downfall as Võ Đức Trung would surrender to Bodindecha, ultimately leading to the Vietnamese withdrawal from Cambodia in November 1841.

In December 1840, from Chikraeng, Phraya Ratchanikun and the Siamese proceeded to attack Stoung, where Nguyễn Công Nhàn was guarding. The Siamese applied the same tactics of building up high earthen mounds to place cannons to fire into the fort. Đoàn Văn Sách marched from Kampong Thom to help Nguyễn Công Nhàn at Stoung, where the Siamese lured Đoàn Văn Sách into the forests and attacked him in all directions. Đoàn Văn Sách was injured, while his brother was killed. Nguyễn Công Nhàn eventually rode off to repel the Siamese attack with heavy Vietnamese casualties.

The three commissioners; Trương Minh Giảng, Lê Văn Đức and Bùi Công Huyên and their forces eventually arrived in Stoung in late December 1840, where they found the Siamese encamping and harvesting rice outside the town. Trương Minh Giảng divided the forces among the three commissioners, each with 1,200 men. Trương Minh Giảng sent Nguyễn Công Nhàn ahead with 700 men as vanguard to attack the Siamese camps and forts. Nguyễn Công Nhàn was able to repel the Siamese from Stoung as the Siamese retreated to Chikraeng. Trương Minh Giảng then advanced to Chikraeng. By this time, the morale of Lao and Northern Khmer ethnic forces serving under the Siamese was low. According to Thai chronicles, the Lao and Northern Khmers at Chikraeng, upon arrival of the Vietnamese, simply deserted the battlefield without engagement. Phraya Ratchanikun tried to control his ethnic forces but to no avail. Trương Minh Giảng and the Vietnamese reclaimed control over Stoung, Chikraeng and the Kampong Thom area by January 1841 as Ratchanikun and the Siamese retreated to Phnom Srok in the Siam-controlled Northwestern Cambodia. Trương Minh Giảng would triumphantly cross the Tonle Sap Lake to deal with the Siamese on the Pursat front but he would be too late for Bodindecha's machinations.

=== Pursat front: Peace Treaty at Pursat ===
In mid-November 1840, Chaophraya Bodindecha, Chaophraya Nakhon Ratchasima Thong-in, their sons Phra Phromborirak Kaew and Phra Phirenthorathep Kham, led Lao–Siamese armies of 8,753 men to attack the Vietnamese-held Pursat or Hải Tây, where the Vietnamese Đề Đốc commander Võ Đức Trung was guarding. In the wet season, the Siamese encamped on the outskirt of Pursat. In late November, Bodindecha sent 4,000 Lao–Siamese men of his armies to attack Pursat. Võ Đức Trung sent out Vietnamese forces to engage. The Siamese prevailed and the Vietnamese retreated into the town, shutting the city gate.

At the end of rainy season and the advent of dry season in December 1840, Chaophraya Bodindecha and his colleague Chaophraya Nakhon Ratchasima ordered the Lao–Siamese to build stockades to surround Pursat, connecting the forts with fences armed with cannons, to lay siege on Pursat. The Siamese fort and fences were of about 440 to 480 meters in distance from Pursat city wall, encircling Pursat. The Siamese also put on stakes to block the Pursat River, preventing the Vietnamese to leave or the auxiliary forces to arrive. In Pursat, the military commander was Võ Đức Trung, the Vietnamese Tuyên phủ governor was Nguyễn Song Thành and the Lãnh binh second commander was Tôn Thất Quý. The Vietnamese of Pursat pursued defensive strategy against the massive number of the Siamese armies, relying on Pursat city walls for defense.

Bodindecha and Nakhon Ratchasima the two Siamese commanders thought that diplomacy might be a way to win over Pursat. In mid-December, the Siamese hanged a letter on Pursat city gate, requesting for conclusion of a peace treaty. Võ Đức Trung and other Vietnamese officials in Pursat replied that they were not entitled to conclude any treaties without consent of the Vietnamese Emperor. Bodindecha, intending to force the Vietnamese to yield with a peace treaty, escalated the attacks on Pursat. The Siamese raised high earthen mounds off the four sides of Pursat city walls, about 2.5 meters higher than the wall and put the Siamese cannons onto the mounds to fire into Pursat town. Siamese cannon fires were destructive, setting houses on fires and leaving fifty people dead inside of Pursat. Võ Đức Trung and the Vietnamese persisted for three days.

In late December 1840, Chaophraya Bodindecha further escalated the siege of Pursat. He built an even closer ring of forts and fences, just about 1.5 meters from the city walls, to choke the Vietnamese in Pursat. It was this time that Oknha Outey Thireach Hing of Samraong Tong, a rebelling Oknha who was encircling the Trấn Tây citadel, captured eight Vietnamese men from Phnom Penh and sent them to Bodindecha at Pursat as a friendly gift. Bodindecha interrogated these eight Vietnamese men and found out a shocking news that the Vietnamese Governor-General of Trấn Tây Trương Minh Giảng had defeated and expelled the Siamese forces under Phraya Ratchanikun out of Stoung and Chikraeng on the Kampong Thom front and Trương Minh Giảng was heading towards the Pursat front to relieve the Siamese attacks. Bodindecha and Nakhon Ratchasima feared that, if the main Vietnamese forces under Trương Minh Giảng arrived in Pursat, the Siamese would be obliged to retreat and become defeated again. The food could only feed the Siamese troops up to a week. The only solution for the Siamese was to force a peace treaty out of Võ Đức Trung before the arrival of Trương Minh Giảng.

After intensive Siamese attacks on the Vietnamese-held Pursat, Chaophraya Bodindecha had Phra Narinyotha Nong write a letter requesting for peace and had the eight Vietnamese captives to deliver the letter directly to Võ Đức Trung in Pursat. Võ Đức Trung, who had been resisting Siamese attacks for about a month, realized that further persistence would only cost the lives of the Vietnamese. Võ Đức Trung sent out Tôn Thất Quý to tell Bodindecha that the Vietnamese of Pursat were willing to conclude a peace treaty, still fearing that this was a Siamese trap. Bodindecha then set up a house for the negotiation. Next day, on 28 December 1840, Võ Đức Trung the commander of Pursat and Nguyễn Song Thành the governor of Pursat came out to meet Bodindecha at the house, where these two Vietnamese officials bowed to Bodindecha the Siamese supreme commander. Bodindecha did not accept such deferential gesture and invited them to sit down casually to discuss as friends.

Bodindecha told Võ Đức Trung and Nguyễn Song Thành that Siam and Vietnam had been friendly countries before. During the times of Emperor Gia Long, Siam and Vietnam had promised to be friendly with each other for perpetuity and Siam had never broke the promise. However, recent misunderstandings such as the rebellions of Anouvong and Lê Văn Khôi had soured Siamese–Vietnamese relations. Bodindecha proposed that Cambodia be under joint Siamese and Vietnamese domination as a compromise, so that Siam and Vietnam would be on amiciable terms again. Two days later, on 30 December 1840, the Vietnamese officials of Pursat; Võ Đức Trung, Nguyễn Song Thành and Tôn Thất Quý, signed a peace treaty with the Siamese general Bodindecha, despite not having endorsement of the Vietnamese Emperor Minh Mạng. The contents of the treaty were;

1. The Vietnamese in Cambodia would cease war with the Cambodians and would withdraw from Cambodia to Châu Đốc altogether
2. The Vietnamese would tell the Emperor Minh Mạng to send diplomatic mission to Bangkok to renew the Siamese–Vietnamese relations on friendly terms.

=== Aftermath of Pursat Peace Treaty ===
After expelling the Siamese from Chikraeng and Stoung, Trương Minh Giảng was to lead his forces to relieve the Siamese attack on Pursat. Reports came that the Cambodians were attacking Sambok (called Sơn Phủ or Sơn Tĩnh), the Vietnamese administrative headquarter on the Mekong region of Eastern Cambodia bordering Champasak Kingdom, so Bùi Công Huyên took some of the forces to relieve the Cambodian attacks on Sambok. Trương Minh Giảng and his deputy Lê Văn Đức took the main Vietnamese forces to cross the Tonle Sap Lake, disembarking at the port of Kampong Luong to the east of Pursat. After the conclusion of the Pursat Peace Treaty on 30 December 1840, Chaophraya Bodindecha the supreme Siamese commander then planned the evacuation of all Vietnamese people from Pursat to deliver them peacefully out of the town. On the exact same day, Trương Minh Giảng and Lê Văn Đức marched from Kampong Luong to attack Pursat. Upon their approach to Pursat, a Siamese man came out telling them not to attack because Võ Đức Trung the Vietnamese commander in Pursat had made a peace treaty with the Siamese commander Bodindecha. Trương Minh Giảng did not believe this and his forces continued beating drums to march. Then a Vietnamese man came out and said the same thing. Trương Minh Giảng and Lê Văn Đức looked at each other in shock. It was late evening. Trương Minh Giảng, not knowing what to do with this bizarre twist of event, decided to retreat back to Kampong Luong to observe.

Next day, on 31 December 1840, Chaophraya Bodindecha sent out the Vietnamese to leave Pursat. Phra Narinyotha Nong the Battambang vice-governor led an army of 1,000 Khmer men to escort Võ Đức Trung, Nguyễn Song Thành, Tôn Thất Quý and 1,500 Vietnamese people in Pursat to Kampong Chhnang, where they were set free. Chaophraya Bodindecha also wrote a diplomatic letter to the "Prime Minister of Huế", sending them along the Vietnamese to Kampong Chhnang. Võ Đức Trung met with Trương Minh Giảng at Kampong Luong. Trương Minh Giảng accused Võ Đức Trung of being a traitor, making a peace treaty with enemy without approval. Võ Đức Trung defended his decision, saying that resisting Siamese attacks was futile and his that his decision saved lives. Trương Minh Giảng then wrote an urgent report to Minh Mạng at Huế, saying that the rebelling Khmers had sought support from Siam and the Siamese commander Bodindecha had come himself to offer a peace treaty. Trương Minh Giảng defended his own inaction, reporting that the enemies were strong and numerous and further fighting would only cost lives. Giảng also suggested that they should observe whether Bodindecha was sincere in his pursuit of peaceful relation with Vietnam.

Bodindecha had successfully procured a peace treaty from the Vietnamese commander Võ Đức Trung of Pursat on December 30 only a few hours before the arrival of Trương Minh Giảng, thus preventing another Siamese defeat and shifting the Cambodian issue to the diplomatic front. Bodindecha knew that the three Vietnamese officials of Pursat were not entitiled nor empowered to conclude such treaty and the treaty served only to halt Trương Minh Giảng's attack on Pursat or perhaps Bodindecha sent another letter to "Prime Minister of Huế" to persuade the Nguyen imperial court to consent to his terms he had made with the three Vietnamese officials.

=== Siamese–Vietnamese diplomatic correspondences ===
Earlier in November 1840, Minh Mạng had appointed Phạm Văn Điển as Kinh lược đại thần (經略大臣) or Military Strategist of Trấn Tây. It took him nearly two months to eventually arrive in Trấn Tây citadel in Phnom Penh in early January 1841. According to Thai chronicles, Ong Ta Tian Kun (Phạm Văn Điển) and Ong Tian Kun (Trương Minh Giảng) were antagonistic to each other. After the Siamese capture of Pursat and arrival of Phạm Văn Điển, Trương Minh Giảng did not return to Trấn Tây citadel in Phnom Penh but rather went with his forces to station at Kampong Thom. arrival of Phạm Văn Điển shifted the power balance among the Vietnamese commissioners in Cambodia. Phạm Văn Điển took over the administration of the Trấn Tây government and Trương Minh Giảng was not the only top official in Cambodia anymore.

After the conclusion of the Pursat Peace Treaty between Chaophraya Bodindecha and the three Vietnamese officials in Pursat on 30 December 1840 and the subsequent expulsion of the Vietnamese from Pursat the next day on December 31, Bodindecha and the Siamese forces continued to occupy Pursat for the next two weeks until their food supply became depleted. On 14 January 1841, Chaophraya Bodindecha, Chaophraya Nakhon Ratchasima Thong-in and the Siamese forces retreated from Pursat back to Battambang, ending the campaign of Siamese offensives onto Cambodia during November 1840 to January 1841. Bodindecha assigned Oknha Surkealok Muk the Khmer governor of Pursat to guard Pursat with 1,100 men against the Vietnamese.

Chaophraya Bodindecha's letter to "Prime Minister of Huế" ended up in the hand of Phạm Văn Điển. In his letter, Bodindecha stated that because the Vietnamese had oppressed the Cambodians, imprisoning their royalty, the Siamese had to come out to rescue the Khmers from Vietnamese oppression. Bodindecha also proposed conditions he had earlier concluded with the three Vietnamese officials in Pursat, in which the Vietnamese should withdraw from Cambodia, retreat to Châu Đốc and send a diplomatic mission to Bangkok to resume friendly relations.

Minh Mạng was shocked and dissatisfied at the developments in Cambodia, saying that the Siamese were hypocritical. After an accident of falling from horseback, the Vietnamese Emperor Minh Mạng died on 20 January 1841 at the age of 49. His last commands about Cambodia were;

- Phạm Văn Điển should cooperate with Trương Minh Giảng to resist any Siamese attacks with their joint forces.
- Vietnamese forces of Hải Đông or Kampong Thom district were entrusted to the commands of Đoàn Văn Sách and Nguyễn Công Nhàn.
- Treacherous endeavor of Võ Đức Trung, Nguyễn Song Thành and Tôn Thất Quý in concluding an unapproved peace treaty with the Siamese at Pursat was unforgivable but their desperate situation, lacking support from Trương Minh Giảng, was understandable so they were pardoned but dismissed from their positions.

At the death of Vietnamese Emperor Minh Mạng, his eldest son Prince Nguyễn Phúc Miên Tông ascended the Vietnamese imperial throne as the new ruler Emperor Thiệu Trị.

Trương Minh Giảng and Phạm Văn Điển jointly wrote a reply letter to Bodindecha at Battambang but in Thai chronicles it was Ong Ta Tien Kun (Phạm Văn Điển) alone who wrote the letter on 11 February 1841 to Bodindecha. The content of the Vietnamese letter was fiery, calling the Siamese hypocritical, saying that Siamese had asserting themselves as upholding the promises but broke the promise several times. Siam had invaded and provoked Cambodia and Vietnam several times but Vietnam had never encroached on a bit of Siamese territory. If the Siamese wanted to make peace, they should retreat to Battambang and stay in their territories so that any negotiations could proceed. If the Siamese wanted to establish friendly relation with Vietnam, they should send a mission first. The Vietnamese diplomatic letter reached Bodindecha at Battambang on 26 February 1841. Phạm Văn Điển also told Bodindecha in his letter that Võ Đức Trung, Nguyễn Song Thành and Tôn Thất Quý were not representatives of the Vietnamese state and were not entitled to conclude any treaties so the treaty Bodindecha had made with them was not valid.

Phạm Văn Điển sent Lê Quốc Hương to bring the Vietnamese letter to Chaophraya Bodindecha, reaching Battambang on 27 February 1841. Bodindecha received the Vietnamese envoy and had the letter translated. However, after Bodindecha read the fiery content of the Vietnamese diplomatic letter, he immediately sent Lê Quốc Hương the Vietnamese delegate back. Trương Minh Giảng eventually returned to Phnom Penh on February 5. The Vietnamese in the Trấn Tây citadel of Phnom Penh had 20,000 fighting men, according to Thai record.

Trương Minh Giảng and Lê Văn Đức petitioned to the new Vietnamese Emperor Thiệu Trị that they had 2,600 men in Hải Đông or Kampong Thom under Đoàn Văn Sách and Nguyễn Công Nhàn but the transportation of food and other supplies from Phnom Penh to Kampong Thom was difficult. After Trương Minh Giảng had repelled the Siamese from Stoung and Chikraeng, the Khmer rebels under the Kampong Svay governor Oknha Dechou Ros dispersed (Dechou Ros himself took refuge in Siam-controlled Battambang) so that there was no need to maintain a garrison in that area. Emperor Thiệu Trị consented to the plan of evacuation of the Hải Đông district. The Vietnamese then withdrew from the Kampong Svay-Kampong Thom area with Đoàn Văn Sách, Nguyễn Công Nhàn and moved to take position at Kampong Chhnang instead to guard against Siamese attacks from Pursat.

=== Siamese Endorsement of Ang Duong ===
Earlier the brothers Princes Ang Em and Ang Duong were Siam-sponsored candidates to Cambodian throne. Prince Ang Duong attempted to launch a coup in Battambang in November 1838 but was caught and sent to Bangkok, where he had been living in the house of Phraya Si Sahathep in virtual house arrest. Prince Ang Em defected to Vietnam in December 1839 but ended up being imprisoned in Huế by the Vietnamese Emperor Minh Mạng. By 1840, all of the Cambodian royalty were either imprisoned or grounded with Prince Ang Em imprisoned in Huế, the three princesses Ang Mey, Ang Peou and Ang Sngoun in exile in Saigon and Prince Ang Duong in house arrest Bangkok. In November 1840, two Cambodian mandarins Oknha Surkealok Muk and Oknha Vibolreach Long had delivered eighteen letters from the Oknhas to Chaophraya Bodindecha the Siamese supreme commander at Pursat, requesting Siam to release prince Ang Duong from Bangkok to Cambodia to be their leader. Bodindecha kept Oknha Surkealok Muk with him in Battambang and sent Oknha Vibolreach Long to present the eighteen Oknha letters to the Siamese king Rama III or King Nangklao at Bangkok.

After examining the Oknha letters, the Siamese king Rama proceeded to endorse the 44-year-old Prince Ang Duong as the Siam-backed candidate for Cambodian kingship. King Rama issued a long lecture to Ang Duong to uphold the Sammādiṭṭhi ("Right View", meaning Theravada Buddhism) against Vietnam's Micchādiṭṭhi ("Wrong View", other religions than Theravada). The Siamese king told Ang Duong to obey and respect Chaophraya Bodindecha the Siamese supreme commander, who would help him to ascend the Cambodian royal throne. King Rama lamented that the Vietnamese had been destroying Theravada Buddhism in Cambodia, dismantling temples and defrocking the monks as they sought to transform the Khmers from Sammādiṭṭhi to Micchādiṭṭhi. The Siamese King Rama made it his mission to restore and uphold Buddhism in Cambodia and the Khmer ethnocultural identity. King Rama also commanded a strategy. As the Vietnamese usually defeated the Siamese in the battles on riparian naval front, the Siamese king told Bodindecha to obstruct Cambodian waterways to prevent the Vietnamese from accessing Khmer towns and to bring the battle onto high grounds as much as possible, avoiding facing the Vietnamese in the Cambodian rivers and canals.

On 1 February 1841, Phraya Siharaj Decho a Siamese official brought the Khmer prince Ang Duong and the Siamese royal order from Bangkok to Battambang, reaching Battambang on February 3. Upon receiving the royal order, Bodindecha wrote a reply to his overlord the Siamese king, saying that he would do everything in every way to bring Cambodia into Siamese domination. He would instigate the Khmer Oknha nobles who had fled the Vietnamese persecutions to lead the forefront anti-Vietnamese movement so that Cambodia and Vietnam would never become allies again. Bodindecha admitted that his diplomatic overtures with the Vietnamese could be genuine or deceptive as Vietnam would be unlikely to relinquish its power in Cambodia. Lastly, Bodindecha declared that if he failed to bring Cambodia into Siamese control, he would not let Vietnam have Cambodia either.

== First Truce: February 1841–January 1842 ==
=== Establishment of two rival Cambodian courts ===
As the Siamese had taken control of Pursat and the Vietnamese had retreated from the Kampong Svay–Kampong Thom area, Chaophraya Bodindecha made Snang Ey, the Khmer leader who had earlier insurreced against Vietnamese rule in 1838, Oknha Dechou Phakkedey the second governor of Kampong Svay and assigned Oknha Dechou Ros and Oknha Dechou Snang Ey the two governors of Kampong Svay to rehabilitate their area devastated by the Siamese–Vietnamese battle and to gather the panicked scattering Khmer people into their town. The Vietnamese had withdrawn forces from all over Cambodia and concentrated on the Trấn Tây citadel of Phnom Penh, with 20,000 men strong. Chaophraya Nakhon Rachasima Thong-in the governor of Nakhon Ratchasima and Bodindecha's second-in-command became ill and had to leave the battlefront for his hometown on 26 January 1841. Bodindecha asked the Siamese king Rama III to send Chaophraya Yommaraj Bunnak to be his new second-in-command under him.

Trương Minh Giảng the Governor-General of Trấn Tây Cambodia and his counselor-deputy Lê Văn Đức went to visit the new Vietnamese Emperor Thiệu Trị at Huế and then returned to Cambodia. Upon is return to Cambodia, in February 1841, Trương Minh Giảng led out Vietnamese forces to successfully repel and dislodge the rebelling Oknhas; Oknha Vongsa Anchit Mey at Prek Thnot (modern Ta Khmau) to the south of Phnom Penh and Oknha Outey Thireach Hing at Stueng Meanchey to the southwest of Phnom Penh. After repelling the Oknhas from the vicinity of Phnom Penh, Trương Minh Giảng sent Tôn Thất Quý, one of the three officials who had earlier concluded a treaty with Bodindecha, to attack and reclaim the Siamese-held Pursat, where Bodindecha had assigned the pro-Siamese Oknha Surkealok Muk to defend.

The Siamese king Rama had earlier commanded Chaophraya Bodindecha the Siamese military leader to establish the pro-Siamese Cambodian prince Ang Duong to be the Siamese candidate for the Cambodian throne at Pursat. On 6 March 1841, Bodindecha and Ang Duong arrived in Pursat. Tôn Thất Quý, who had been attacking Pursat, eventually retreated. Per the command of his overlord the Siamese king, Chaophraya Bodindecha adopted the strategy of taking position at high grounds against the Vietnamese who usually came by the waterways. Bodindecha constructed a new citadel for Ang Duong on a high ground near Pursat.

Lê Văn Đức resigned from his position as Tham tán Đại thần or counselor of Trấn Tây due to illness so the Vietnamese Emperor Thiệu Trị appointed Nguyễn Công Trứ to be the new Tham tán Đại thần. Nguyễn Công Trứ had been an advocate of restoration of the Cambodian monarchy and reclaiming Cambodia through winning hearts rather than through battles. Nguyễn Công Trứ seemed to convince Trương Minh Giảng to propose to Thiệu Trị in March 1841 for the releases of the Cambodian royalty, including the princesses Ang Mey, Ang Peou, Ang Sngoun, who had been in custody in Saigon and the Prince Ang Em who used to be a Siam-sponsored candidate and defected to Vietnam in late 1839 but ended up imprisoned at Huế by the previous emperor Minh Mạng. Trương Minh Giảng also called for the release of high-ranking Cambodian mandarins who had earlier been punished including Chauvea Tolaha Long (Trà Long), Samdech Chauponhea Hu (Nhâm Vu), Oknha Kralahom Kinh (La Kiên), these three were exiled to Northern Vietnam and Oknha Veang Tom (Ốc Tâm) who was exiled to Vĩnh Long. Thiệu Trị allowed the three princesses and Oknha Veang Tom to be released back to Cambodia, refusing to release the prince Ang Em and the three Cambodian ministers, saying that their crimes were still unforgivable.

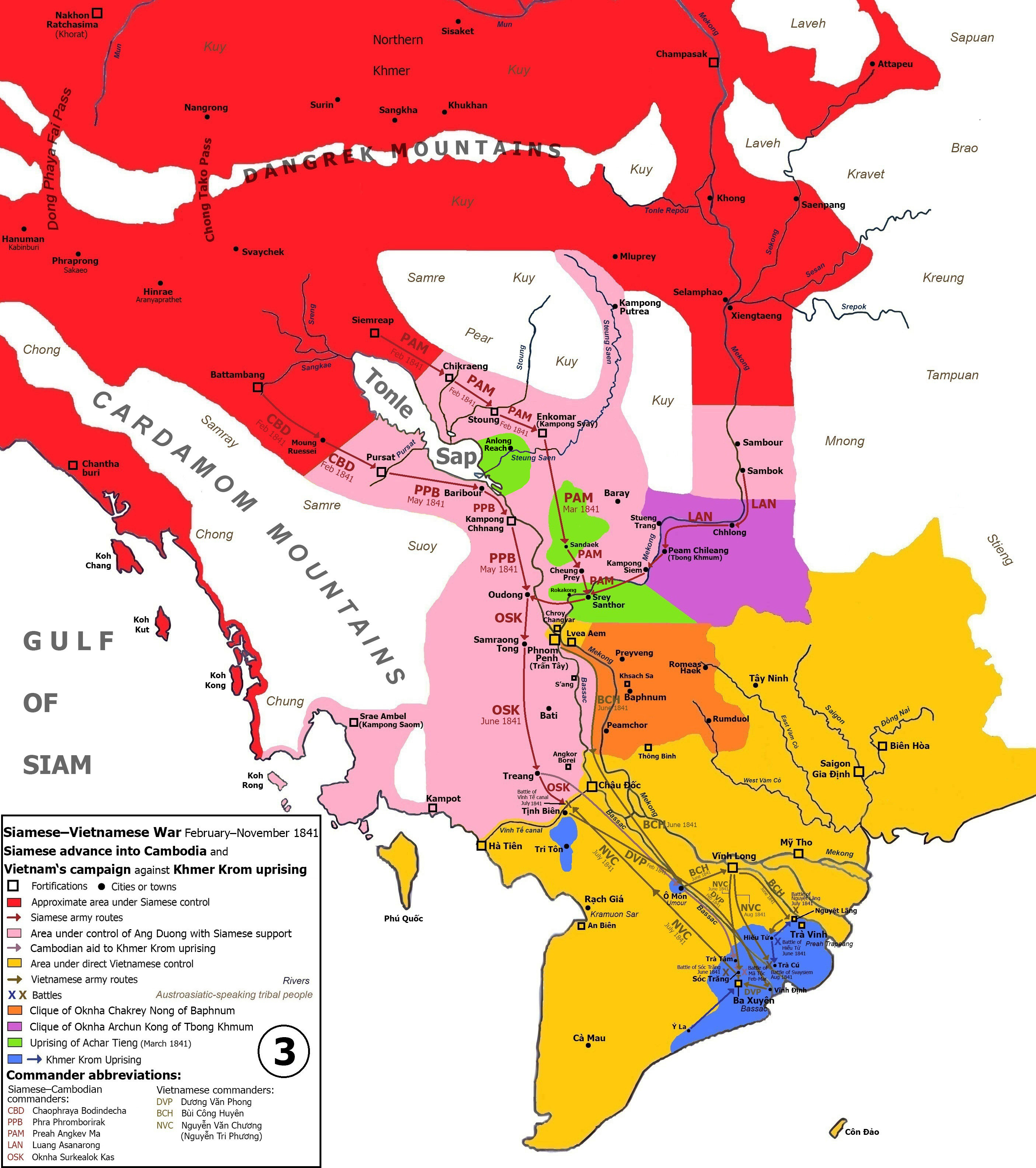
Siamese–Vietnamese War: February–November 1841 Siamese advance into Cambodia: By mid-1841, Chaophraya Bodindecha and Ang Duong had taken control of Western Cambodia, taking position at Oudong, while the Vietnamese were reduced and restricted to the Phnom Penh vicinity. Area of direct Siamese control Area controlled by Ang Duong under support of Chaophraya Bodindecha Vietnamese suppression of Khmer Krom Uprising: In 1841, the Khmer Kroms of Mekong Delta had been rebelling against Vietnam at Ba Xuyên and Lạc Hóa. Area of direct Vietnamese control Khmer Krom uprising

The Vietnamese commanded Oknha Veang Tom to lead the riparian procession of the three princesses Ang Mey, Ang Peou, Ang Sngoun, along with Neak Neang Ros the mother of Ang Em and Ang Duong, from Saigon to Phnom Penh, reaching Phnom Penh on 27 April 1841. Trương Minh Giảng had declarations in Khmer language placed on placards to announce that the Cambodian royalty had returned to Phnom Penh to encourage the rebelling Khmers to resume loyalty to Vietnam. Chaophraya Bodindecha was greatly concerned by this shift of Vietnamese policy as presence of a Vietnam-backed candidate in Phnom Penh would jeopardize Bodindecha's plan to rally the Khmers to submit to Ang Duong. Bodindecha thought that Ang Duong in Pursat would be too far from Phnom Penh to rally any substantial popular support so he decided to abandon his plan of the new Pursat fortress and move Ang Duong to Oudong, the former Cambodian royal capital, about thirty kilometers to the northwest of Phnom Penh. Bodindecha assigned his son Phra Phromborirak to lead an army of 5,000 men to parade Ang Duong from Pursat to Oudong, leaving Pursat on 29 April 1841 and arriving in Oudong on May 6, placing Ang Duong to stay at Khleang Sbek, the place of Chaophraya Aphaiphubet Baen the Siam-appointed Regent of Cambodia during 1790–1795.

Cambodia then became divided into three parties with two opposing courts at Oudong and Phnom Penh, under Ang Duong and Ang Mey, each supported by Siam and Vietnam, respectively. Ang Duong and the Siamese controlled most of Western Cambodia, from Pursat and Kampong Svay down to Kampot and Kampong Saom on the coastline. The Vietnamese only controlled the Phnom Penh vicinity and the third party was the independent warlord clique of Oknha Chakrey Nong in Southeastern Cambodia centered on Ba Phnum. Even though on opposite political camps, the Cambodian royalty were relatives. Ang Mey and Neak Neang Ros sent a secret letter to Ang Duong at Oudong, urging Ang Duong to send forces to fetch them to join Ang Duong at Oudong. Oknha Veang Tom, the pro-Vietnamese chief minister of Ang Mey, learned about this secret endeavor and tightened security to prevent the Khmer royal ladies from escaping.

=== Khmer Krom Uprising in Southern Vietnam ===
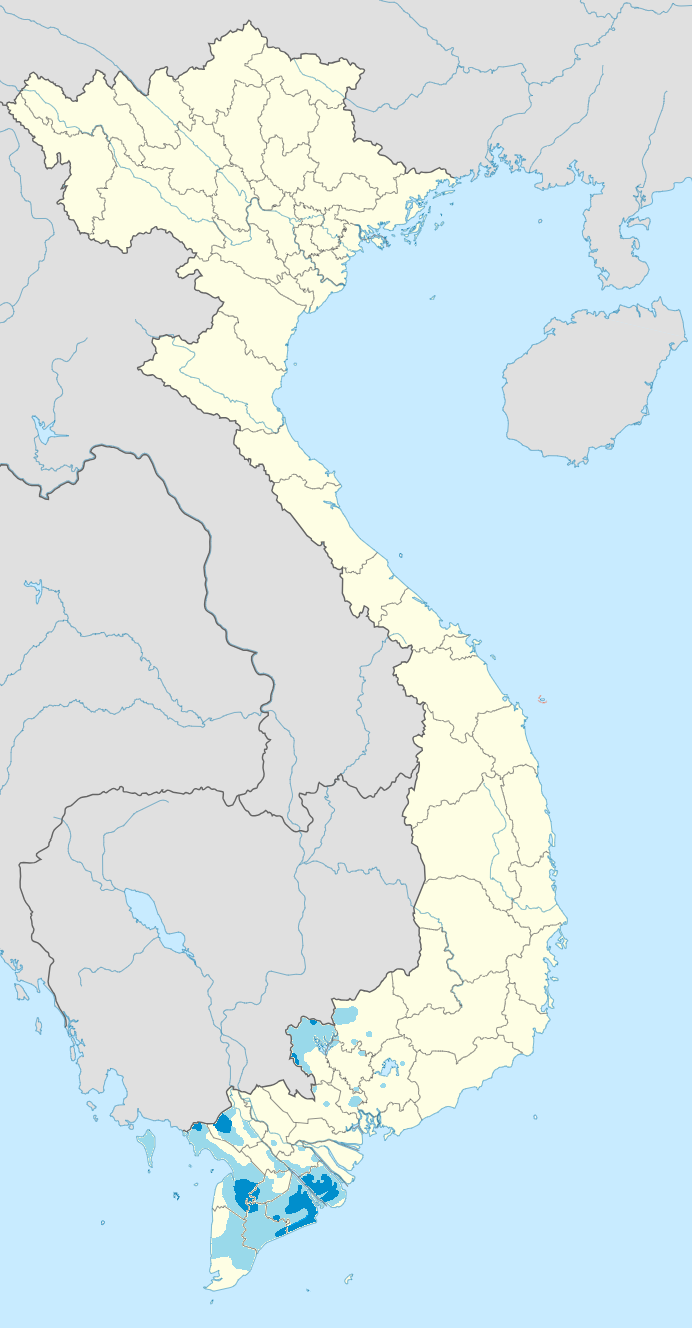
Modern distribution of Khmer Krom people in Southern Vietnam

Even though Vietnam had taken control over most parts of Cochinchina or Southern Vietnam by the nineteenth century through the process of Nam tiến or Southward Expansion, there were still some pockets of Cambodian towns governed by Oknha officials. There were Khmer Oknha governors in Moat Chruk (Mật Luật, Tĩnh Biên), Umor (Ô Môn, near Cần Thơ), Kramuon Sar (Khmer: ក្រមួនស, An Biên in Kiên Giang) and Bassac (Khmer: បាសាក់, Ba Xuyên, modern Sóc Trăng). During the period of Vietnamese rule over Cambodia, Trương Minh Giảng annexed Choan Chum, Moat Chruk, Umor and Bassac into the Vietnamese An Giang province. The Khmers of the Mekong Delta who were incorporated into Vietnam were eventually called the Khmer Kroms.

When the Cambodians generally arose against the Vietnamese rule in September 1840, two Khmer Krom leaders Oknha Reachea Setthey (Kỳ La) the governor of Moat Chruk (Tĩnh Biên) and Oknha Athikvongsa Tot (Việt Tốt) the governor of Bassac (Ba Xuyên) arise against Vietnam in Tĩnh Biên. Lê Quang Huyên the Vietnamese governor of Hà Tiên sent other Khmer Krom leaders Oknha Ravidechou or Oknha Thit (Chân Triết) and Oknha Vongsa Sangkream Meas (Hàn Biện) from An Biên to suppress the Khmer Krom rebellion at Tĩnh Biên. However, Oknha Thit and Oknha Meas ended up joining their fellow Khmer Kroms in resisting Vietnamese rule. The Khmer Kroms established themselves at Tri Tôn near Thất Sơn or Bảy Núi Mountains. 2,000 Khmer Krom men attacked Rạch Giá the Vietnamese headquarter near An Biên in December 1840. Lê Quang Huyên sailed fleet from Hà Tiên to successfully repel the Khmer Kroms from Rạch Giá.

Dương Văn Phong the Tổng đốc An Hà or governor of the coupling An Giang and Hà Tiên provinces joined with Lê Quang Huyên the governor of Hà Tiên to inflict two-pronged attack on the Khmer Krom base at Tri Tôn in late December 1840, killing Oknha Thit the rebel leader while other Khmer Krom leaders fled downstream the Bassac River to Bassac or Ba Xuyên at the mouth of Bassac River, where the Khmer Kroms would soon arise.

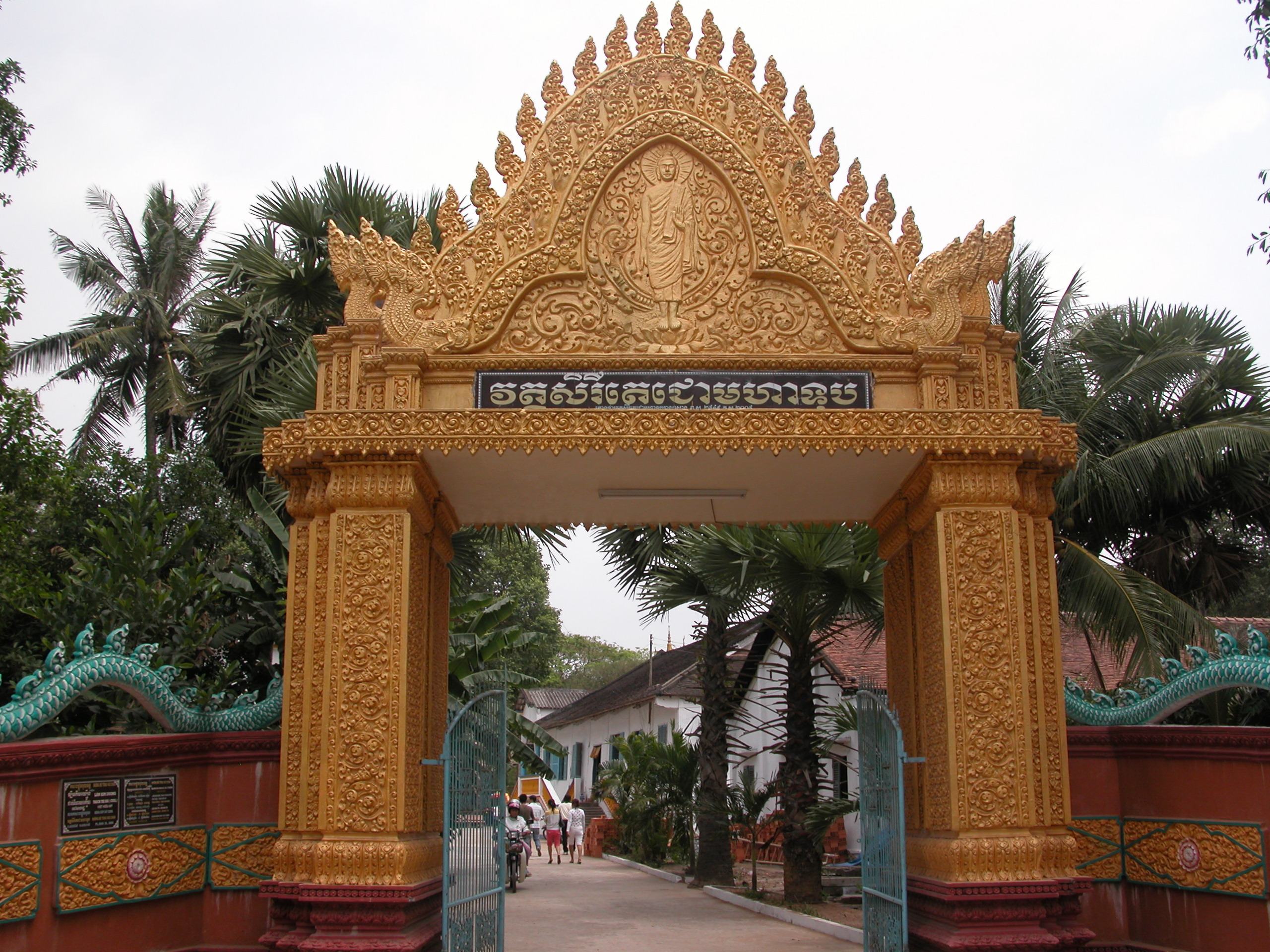
Vatt Siri Techo Maha Thup temple, a Theravadin Khmer Krom temple in modern Sóc Trăng was the site of a battle between the Khmer Kroms and the Vietnamese in early 1841.

In early February 1841, Khmer Krom leaders including Oknha Athikvongsa Tot (Sơn Tốt) and Oknha Vongsa Sangkream Meas led an uprising against Vietnam in Ba Xuyên, modern Sóc Trăng in Sóc Trăng province. Moreover, this Khmer Krom resistance against Vietnam was joined by Chinese immigrants in Southern Vietnam led by a Chinese merchant named Trần Lâm or Chen Lin (陳林). Dương Văn Phong, who had been in Tĩnh Biên after the defeat of the Khmer Kroms there, sailed his Vietnamese fleet to successfully crush another Khmer Krom rebellion at Sóc Trăng. Oknha Athikvongsa Tot died in battle but other Khmer leaders fled and regrouped. The Cambodian Oknhas sent Oknha Sena Reachea Sangkream the governor of Baribour with a number of Cambodian men to assist the Khmer Kroms at Ba Xuyên. Dương Văn Phong became ill so he sent out his relative to lead Vietnamese troops to attack the Khmer Kroms at Vatt Mahathup temple (Mã Tộc) in late February but the Vietnamese were ambushed and massacred by the Khmer Kroms under Oknha Vongsa Sangkream.

Trương Minh Giảng was alarmed by the Vietnamese defeat at Ba Xuyên so he sent 1,000 Vietnamese men under Mai Văn Đổng from Phnom Penh to aid Dương Văn Phong at Sóc Trăng. Dương Văn Phong was still ill so he sent Mai Văn Đổng to attack the Khmers at Vatt Mahatup temple again in March 1841, where the Vietnamese were again ambushed and massacred by the Khmers under Oknha Sena Reachea Sangkream with Mai Văn Đổng killed in battle. Vietnamese Emperor Thiệu Trị was extremely angry at these humiliating defeats so he dismissed Dương Văn Phong from his Tổng đốc An Hà position and appointed Bùi Công Huyên as the new Tổng đốc An Hà or governor of An Giang and Hà Tiên provinces. Bùi Công Huyên was already the Tổng đốc Long Tường or governor of Vĩnh Long and Định Tường provinces. Bùi Công Huyên was thus made the governor of four out of six provinces of Cochinchina. Also, Thiệu Trị sent Nguyễn Văn Chương (later changed his name to Nguyễn Trí Phương) from Da Nang down south to partake in the campaign to subjugate the Khmer Krom rebellion.

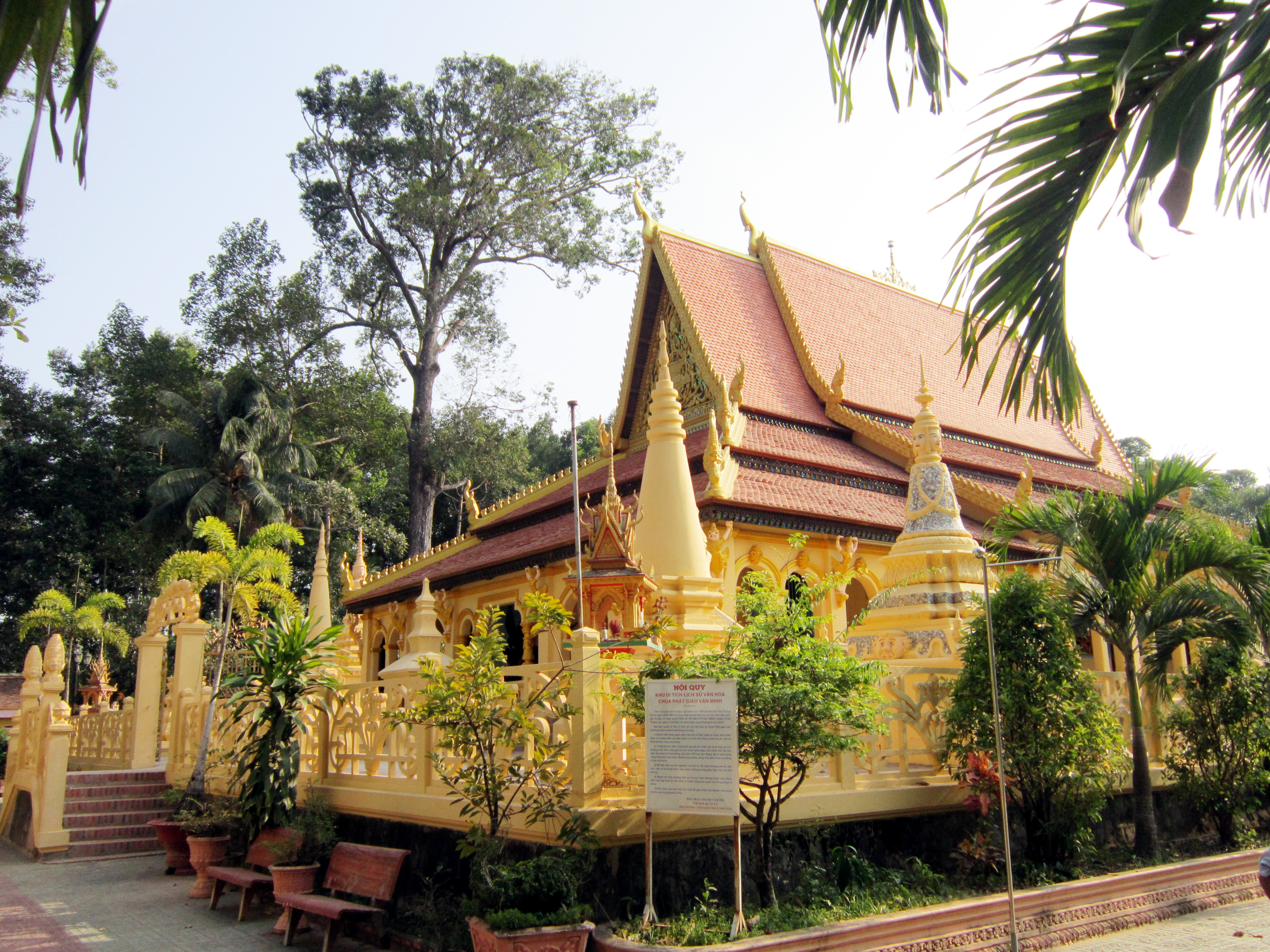
Angkorajaborey temple, a Khmer Krom Theravadin temple in Trà Vinh, Trà Vinh province, called Chùa Âng in Vietnamese.

During this ongoing Khmer uprising in Ba Xuyên or Sóc Trăng, another Khmer Krom uprising erupted in Trà Vinh to the northeast of Sóc Trăng. Lạc Hóa, in modern Trà Vinh province, was long inhabited by the Khmers, who called this town Preah Trapeang (Khmer: ព្រះត្រពាំង), but were eventually incorporated into Vietnamese Vĩnh Long province. In May 1841, a former Cambodian official named Lâm Sâm declared himself a Neak Sel or holy magician man with supernatural powers, adorning himself with Buddhist monk robes, rallied the local Khmer Krom people in Trà Vinh to arise against Vietnam and to restore the Cambodian monarchy. As this new Khmer Krom rebellion sprang up in Trà Vinh, the Vietnamese were obliged to split forces to suppress the Khmer Kroms both at Ba Xuyên and Trà Vinh. Emperor Thiệu Trị entrusted Bùi Công Huyên from Phnom Penh to deal with the rebels at Trà Vinh, while Nguyễn Văn Chương (Nguyễn Trí Phương) was assigned to suppress the rebellion at Ba Xuyên.

In June 1841, Bùi Công Huyên took position at Nguyệt Lãng and sent Trần Tuyên as vanguard to lead 1,000 Khmer Vietnamese men to suppress the Lâm Sâm Rebellion at Trà Vinh but the Vietnamese ended up being ambushed by the Khmer Kroms and Trần Tuyên fell in battle. Lâm Sâm then proceeded to attack Bùi Công Huyên at Nguyệt Lãng but was repelled. On the Ba Xuyên front, Nguyễn Văn Chương was more successful. Despite being inferior in number, Nguyễn Văn Chương launched attack on the Khmer Krom camp at Trà Tâm by land and by waterways, defeating and dispersing the Khmers from Ba Xuyên. Meanwhile, Ang Duong the pro-Siam candidate at Oudong sent Oknha Surkealok Kas the former Pursat governor to seize control of the crucial Vĩnh Tế Canal that connected Châu Đốc with Hà Tiên. Oknha Kas filled the canal with soil in order to obstruct and obliterate the canal. Nguyễn Văn Chương hurriedly sailed from Sóc Trăng to attack and repel Oknha Kas from the canal. Nguyễn Văn Chương then realized the Siamese were attempting to destroy the Vĩnh Tế Canal so he built fortresses and stationed more men to guard the canal. In July 1841, when Nguyễn Văn Chương was away busy defending the Vĩnh Tế Canal, Lâm Sâm the Khmer Krom rebel leader at Trà Vinh sent another Chinese man named Chen Hong to raise forces to attack Ba Xuyên. Bùi Công Huyên had to march to defend Ba Xuyên and repel Chen Hong.

=== Vietnamese withdrawal from Cambodia ===
Prince Ang Em used to be a pro-Thai candidate for the Cambodian throne, staying in Bangkok during 1813–1833. Ang Em and his younger brother Ang Duong shared the same mother Neak Neang Ros, a consort of their father King Ang Eng. In 1833, the Siamese commander Chaophraya Bodindecha led Siamese forces to invade Cambodia, placing Ang Em and Ang Duong to rally supports for Siam in Phnom Penh. However, twenty years of Ang Em and Ang Duong in Siam had disconnected them from the Khmer populace. Both Ang Em and Ang Duong failed to incite popular support as the Siamese were obliged to retreat by early 1834. In order to let them learn governance, Siamese king Rama III made Ang Em governor of Battambang and Ang Duong governor of Mongkolborey, both in the Siam-controlled Northwestern Cambodia. However, conflicts soon erupted between the brothers Em and Duong, leading to Ang Duong being taken to Bangkok in 1838. Ang Em, urged by Trương Minh Giảng, resented that Siam had failed to raise him as the King of Cambodia and defected to the Vietnamese side in 1839 but ended up being imprisoned in Huế, while his son Prince Ang Phim was exiled to Khánh Hòa province in Central Vietnam.

In February 1841, the Siamese king Rama endorsed Ang Duong as the Siamese candidate for Cambodian kingship, ordering Chaophraya Bodindecha the Siamese commander in Cambodia to establish Ang Duong as the King of Cambodia. Bodindecha took Ang Duong to Battambang, Pursat and eventually to Oudong the former Cambodian royal capital in May 1841. Meanwhile, the Vietnamese Emperor Thiệu Trị allowed the Cambodian princesses Ang Mey, Ang Peou, Ang Snguon, also Ang Em's mother Neak Neang Ros to return from Saigon to Cambodia to rally Khmer popular support for Vietnam. Nguyễn Công Trứ the counselor of Trấn Tây came up with the idea of reclaiming Cambodia through persuasion, employing Cambodian royalty to incite popular support to Vietnam, rather than through military forces alone. Ang Mey and other royal ladies arrived in Phnom Penh in April 1841 but failed to produce any fruitful results as the Khmers were largely weary of six-year Vietnamese rule. In one last attempt to save the Trấn Tây regime, Nguyễn Công Trứ petitioned in July 1841 to Emperor Thiệu Trị to pardon and release Ang Em, allowing Ang Em to return to Cambodia to rally supports for Vietnam.

After being imprisoned for more than a year, Ang Em was finally set free as Ang Em and his son Ang Phim returned to Cambodia, reaching Phnom Penh on 6 October 1841. However, Ang Em, like Ang Mey, did not manage to attract the Khmers. Situation for the Vietnamese in the Trấn Tây citadel became increasingly desperate, facing foot shortages, hunger and diseases with the rebelling Cambodian Oknhas surrounding in all directions. Eventually, the Vietnamese decided to abandon Cambodia and retreat to Châu Đốc altogether. Vietnamese commissioners in Trấn Tây including Trương Minh Giảng (Tướng quân, Governor-General), Phạm Văn Điển (Kinh lược đại thần, military strategist), Nguyễn Công Trứ (Tham tán Đại thần, counselor or deputy governor), Đoàn Văn Sách (Đề đốc, military commander) and Nguyễn Công Nhàn (Lãnh binh, second commander), all petitioned to Emperor Thiệu Trị for withdrawal of the Vietnamese from Cambodia. Thiệu Trị himself thought that holding Cambodia any further would be impractical and detrimental, as maintaining the Trấn Tây province of Cambodia had been taking toll on Southern Vietnamese people, whom Thiệu Trị considered his subjects but not the Khmers.

During late October to early November 1841, the Vietnamese dismantled the Cham fort at Chroy Changvar and gather around 2,000 of Khmer, Vietnamese, Chinese and Muslim Cham people who were still loyal to Vietnam, along with the Cambodian royalty Ang Em, Ang Mey, Ang Peou, Ang Sngoun, Ang Phim and Neak Neang Ros, taking all of them downstream the Bassac, reaching Châu Đốc in Southern Vietnam on 9 November 1841. Trương Minh Giảng, who had been the Tướng quân or Governor-General of Trấn Tây Cambodia for six years since 1835, could not cope with the loss of Cambodia and committed suicide by drinking poison. Thiệu Trị abolished the Trấn Tây province and all of the offices, positions and titles associated with it. This Vietnamese withdrawal from Cambodia was a triumph for Siam, who would soon establish dominance over Cambodia in the place of the Vietnamese.

=== Establishment of Siamese domination over Cambodia ===
Chaophraya Bodindecha the top Siamese commander in Cambodia had earlier assigned his son Phra Phromborirak to bring Ang Duong from Pursat to Oudong in May 1841, at Khleang Sbek, where Ang Duong established his own court in competition with the Vietnam-backed court of his niece Ang Mey at the Trấn Tây citadel of Phnom Penh, while Bodindecha himself stayed at Pursat. Six months later, in early November 1841, the Vietnamese eventually withdrew their troops and officials from Cambodia, retreating from Phnom Penh to Châu Đốc, where Trương Minh Giảng committed suicide, ending Vietnamese rule and domination over Cambodia. As the Vietnamese had left, it was the time for Siamese domination over Cambodia. Chaophraya Bodindecha marched the main Siamese armies from Pursat to Oudong, reaching Oudong on 2 December 1841. Chaophraya Bodindecha, who had always been on a mission to find a strategic defensible spot to build a fortress to defend Ang Duong from the Vietnamese, contemplated building a new fort at Ponhea Lueu, a neighborhood in the southern vicinity of Oudong. However, Bodindecha soon realized that he needed to take position at Phnom Penh due to the strategic importance of Phnom Penh as the junction of four waterways, a center of communications in Cambodia. Bodindecha then brought Ang Duong from Oudong down to Phnom Penh, reaching Phnom Penh on December 18. Ang Duong and the Siamese took Phnom Penh as their new headquarter.

Vietnamese departure allowed the Siamese to take control over Cambodia. In fact, this was the first time in twenty-eight years, since 1813, that Siam came to dominate Cambodia. Through decades of offensive campaigns, political machinations, alternating between victories and defeats and taking the opportunity of the general Cambodian uprising against Vietnam during 1840–1841, Siam managed to reclaim control over Cambodia after losing its grip when the Cambodian king Ang Chan distanced himself from Siam and approached Vietnam to protect Cambodia from Siam during the events of 1812–1813. However, by 1841, there was still an independent clique of Oknha Chakrey Nong, who did not submit to Ang Duong, in Southeastern Cambodia at Ba Phnum.

=== Siamese plan to destroy Vĩnh Tế canal ===
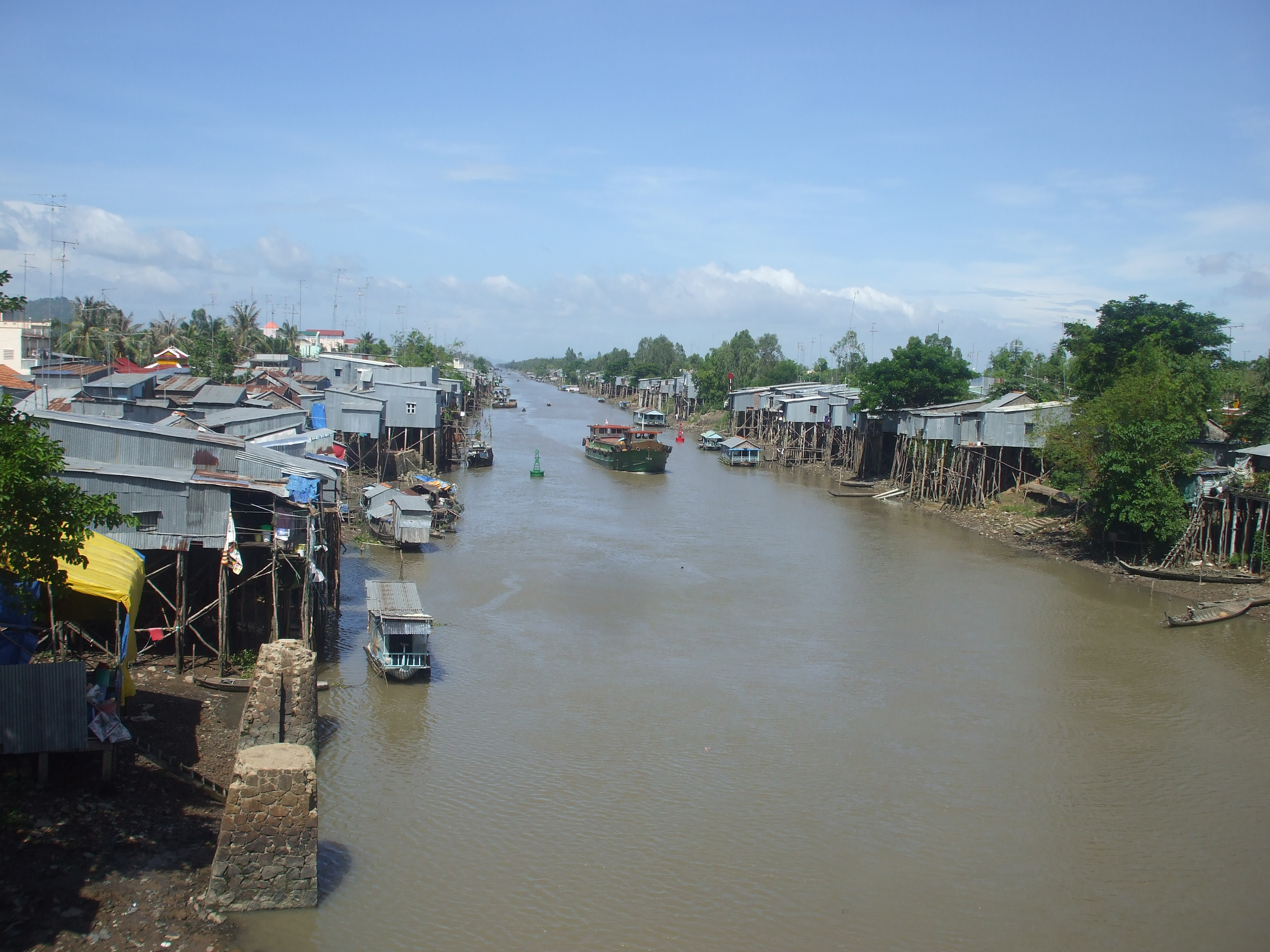
A portion of Vĩnh Tế Canal in Châu Đốc, An Giang Province

As Chaophraya Bodindecha and Ang Duong had taken position at Phnom Penh, the Siamese king Rama III or King Nangklao put forward his plan to fill up and destroy the Vĩnh Tế canal, which connected Châu Đốc with the seaport of Hà Tiên, an important communication line for Vietnam. The Vĩnh Tế canal, taking many years to dig, was completed in 1824. The Siamese court had been taking a very negative and suspicious view on the Vĩnh Tế canal since the 1820s. In Siamese opinion, the Vĩnh Tế canal would facilitate the mobilization of Vietnamese fleet from Southern Vietnam to enter Gulf of Siam, directly threatening Bangkok. In December 1841, King Rama at Bangkok sent a new command to Bodindecha at Phnom Penh, stating that they should take advantage of this Vietnamese setback to attack Southern Vietnam in order to distract the Vietnamese while Bodindecha would send labors to fill and destroy Vĩnh Tế canal. Severing the Vĩnh Tế canal would allow the Siamese to single out Châu Đốc (An Giang) and Hà Tiên separately to attack as these two Vietnamese headquarters would not be able to support each other. King Rama would send two contingents to attack Châu Đốc by land from Cambodia and to attack Hà Tiên by sea. King Rama also reassured that Bodindecha had been granted absolute powers in Cambodia to do anything Bodindecha saw fit;

Since Ong Tian Kun [Trương Minh Giảng] has withdrawn all of the troops from Cambodia, therefore, Cambodia now belongs to Ang Duong. You should fill up the digged [Vĩnh Tế] canal first, not letting the Vietnamese to dredge it to be a [functioning] canal again. Then the Vietnamese who had been guarding Banthaimat [Hà Tiên] would be shattered away, so that then we could boldy attack Banthaimat [Hà Tiên] and Chodok [Châu Đốc]. If Banthaimat [Hà Tiên] could not stand, the Vietnamese of Chodok [Châu Đốc] will be apprehended. The Khmers will be motivated to attack the Vietnamese, being more courageous and bold. How can the Vietnamese persist [in this situation]?

After receiving this new mission from the Siamese king, Chaophraya Bodindecha realized this was a difficult assignment. The plan itself was not practical as, in order to permanently destroy the Vĩnh Tế canal, Bodindecha had to firmly control the territories on both sides of the canal, which had been under firm Vietnamese control of Hà Âm and Hà Dương districts. Even though the Siamese had managed to seize control of Cambodia from the Vietnam, wrestling control of native territory of Southern Vietnam proper would be a different story. Bodindecha and the Siamese had to put in a huge amount of resources and manpower in order to conquer the Vĩnh Tế canal and to maintain a long-lasting presence in the area.

The Khmer Oknhas of Kampot had earlier requested Siamese aid against the Vietnamese so a Siamese fleet had been dispatched from Bangkok to station at Koh Kong Island per this request. In October 1841, King Rama sent out Phraya Ratchawangsan Nok the commander of Krom Asa Cham or ethnic Malay Naval Regiment serving under Siam to bring the fleet of ten Vietnamese-style fort-warships, which were built in 1835 to imitate the Vietnamese warships themselves, with 552 men to station at Koh Kong Island, joing the previous Siamese fleet there in preparation of the attack on Hà Tiên. Rice shortage in Cambodia had been a persisting problem for both the Siamese and the Vietnamese, in their respective controls of Cambodia. King Rama sent a large quantity of rice shipped in the merchantile brig Ariel, the first Siam-made Western style seafaring ship, made by Chuang Bunnag in 1835, to transport rice to Bodindecha in Cambodia.

Earlier in July 1841, Chaophraya Bodindecha and Ang Duong had sent Oknha Surkealok Kas to attack the Vĩnh Tế canal. Nguyễn Văn Chương (Nguyễn Trí Phương) repelled the Khmers from the canal. This move made the Vietnamese realized the Cambodians-Siamese were planning to destroy Vĩnh Tế canal so Nguyễn Văn Chương constructed several forts with garrisons to protect the canal. Chaophraya Bodindecha replied to the Siamese king in his letter reporting that the Vietnamese had built nineteen forts, each with around 200-500 guarding men on the side of the canal. Bodindecha also told the king that he lacked able commanders in Cambodia and asked the king to appoint competent commanders for both the land and sea routes to attack Southern Vietnam. Lastly, Bodindecha told the king that the rice carried by the brig Ariel should be transported to him through the Cambodian port of Kampot.

=== Vietnamese suppression of Khmer Krom rebellion ===
Phạm Văn Điển was the highest-ranking among the former Trấn Tây officials, after the death of Trương Minh Giảng. When the Vietnamese retreated from Cambodia to Châu Đốc in early November 1841, Phạm Văn Điển assigned Ang Mey and other Cambodian royal ladies to live in Châu Phú in southern vicinity of Châu Đốc. Vietnamese withdrawal from Cambodia allowed the Vietnamese to concentrate their forces and effort in suppression of the ongoing persisting Khmer Krom rebellion in Southern Vietnam. The Khmer leader Lâm Sâm had been rallying the Khmer Krom people and Chinese immigrants in Ba Xuyên (Sóc Trăng) and Lạc Hóa (Trà Vinh) to resist Vietnamese rule. After arriving in Châu Đốc, Phạm Văn Điển immediately sent Đoàn Văn Sách and Nguyễn Công Nhàn out to bring forces of 3,000 men to suppress the Khmer Krom uprising at Lạc Hóa. These former Trấn Tây officials and commanders were found guilty of losing Cambodia but they were pardoned as the Vietnamese Emperor Thiệu Trị needed their military experiences and they were required to serve in suppressing the Khmer Krom rebellion to atone for their failures. Emperor Thiệu Trị appointed these former Trấn Tây commanders to administrative positions in Southern Vietnam;

- Phạm Văn Điển was appointed as the acting Tổng đốc An Hà or the viceroy of An Giang (Châu Đốc) and Hà Tiên provinces. The An Giang province covered Ba Xuyên (Sóc Trăng).
  - Nguyễn Công Trứ was appointed as acting Tuần phủ sub-governor of An Giang, under Phạm Văn Điển.
- Though Nguyễn Văn Chương (Nguyễn Trí Phương) was not a former Trấn Tây official, he had been instrumental in suppressing the Khmer Krom uprising. Nguyễn Văn Chương was appointed as the Tuần phủ sub-governor of Vĩnh Long province, while also acting as Tổng đốc Long Tường or the viceroy of Vĩnh Long and Định Tường provinces. The Vĩnh Long province covered Lạc Hóa (Trà Vinh).
- Lê Văn Đức, who had earlier resigned from his position of Tham tán Đại thần or deputy Governor-General of Trấn Tây in March 1841 due to illness, was made Tổng đốc Định Biên or governor of Gia Định and Biên Hòa provinces, technically the governor of Saigon.

Some other former Trấn Tây officials were appointed to administrative positions in An Giang and Hà Tiên. The Vietnamese sources stated that, by November 1841, there were 10,000 Siamese men under Chaophraya Bodindecha stationed at Oudong and another 10,000 Siamese men at Kampong Saom (at Koh Kong Island), while the Khmer Krom rebels in Southern Vietnam had 5,000 men. Thiệu Trị, however, did not believe in this report, saying that as rice shortage had been prevalent in Cambodia it was impossible for the Siamese to maintain such large number of garrisons. Both the Siamese and the Vietnamese had been suffering from rice shortages during their respective occupations of Cambodia. Even the Cambodian Oknhas themselves could not feed their troops and they had to allow the conscripts to go home to find food.

The Khmer prince Ang Em volunteered to help the Vietnamese suppress the Khmer Krom uprising. Phạm Văn Điển assigned a regiment of Khmer Kroms who were loyal to Vietnam for Ang Em to join Nguyễn Văn Chương in suppressing the rebellion. Due to support of the former Trấn Tây forces, Nguyễn Văn Chương was finally able to defeat and end the Khmer Krom rebellion in Lạc Hóa (Trà Vinh) in late November to early December 1841. Presence of Ang Em swayed a large number of Khmer Kroms to lay down their arms and submit to Vietnam, dissolving the Khmer Krom movement against Vietnam itself. Nguyễn Văn Chương captured 7,683 rebels including the Khmer Kroms, the Chinese immigrants and the Vietnamese who had been dissatisfied with the government. The rebel leaders at Lạc Hóa were executed, their heads were on spikes for display. However, the main rebel leader Lâm Sâm escaped.

Emperor Thiệu Trị was rather traumatized by the loss of Cambodia and, for a while, did not consent to anything concerning defence against the Siam-dominated Cambodia. In late December 1841, Lương Văn Liễu the Tuần phủ governor of Hà Tiên noticed Siamese military activities in Koh Kong Island near Kampot, which was close to Hà Tiên. Lương Văn Liễu asked for more troops and for fortifications of Hà Tiên to be strengthened but Thiệu Trị refused, saying that Hà Tiên had already been covered and protected by the Vietnamese garrison at Châu Đốc. Vietnamese officials in Southern Vietnam began to receive reports about Cambodian activities near the Cambodian–Vietnamese border. In early January 1842, Nguyễn Công Trứ the sub-governor of An Giang, along with Đoàn Văn Sách, marched an army to inspect the Vĩnh Tế canal. Nguyễn Công Trứ reported to the Emperor that the incoming Cambodian attack on Vĩnh Tế canal was very possible this dry season and asked for reinforcements. Thiệu Trị again refused, saying that the Khmers were too disorganized to stage a full attack.

When Thiệu Trị learned that the Vietnamese commanders in Southern Vietnam had allowed the Cambodian prince Ang Em to partake in the suppression of Khmer Krom rebellions and that a large number of Khmer Kroms had submitted to Ang Em, he was not pleased. Thiệu Trị preferred the Khmer Kroms of Southern Vietnam to be his direct subjects rather than Ang Em's subjects. Thiệu Trị reprimanded the Vietnamese commanders for allowing Ang Em to participate in suppressing the rebellion, saying that the Vietnamese themselves alone could defeat the rebels, not requiring aid from Ang Em. Thiệu Trị then commanded Ang Em to go to Thất Sơn Mountains to incite support from Khmer people in the Siam-controlled Cambodia instead. Thai chronicles stated that Ang Em 'ruled' over 'Southern Khmer' towns including Treang Troi Tras (Choan Chum), Toek Khmau (Cà Mau), Kramuon Sar (An Biên), Umour (Ô Môn), Moat Chruk (Tịnh Biên), Bassac (Sóc Trăng) and Preah Trapeang (Trà Vinh). In January 1842, Nguyễn Văn Chương marched from Lạc Hóa, in concert with Ang Em who marched from Châu Đốc, to defeat the last Khmer Krom stronghold at Ba Xuyên (Bassac). The Khmer Krom uprising against Vietnam, ongoing since October 1840, was technically and mostly over, although there were subsequent sporadic uprisings. Lâm Sâm the Khmer rebel leader was captured by the fellow Khmer Kroms who were loyal to Vietnam in January 1842. Lâm Sâm was executed by slow-slicing.

== Siamese attack on Hà Tiên and Vĩnh Tế canal (1842) ==
Siamese Attack on Hà Tiên and Vĩnh Tế canal (1842)
- Part of Siamese–Vietnamese wars
Date	24 January 1842 – 8 April 1842
Location	Cambodia and Southern Vietnam: Hà Tiên, Choan Chum, Vĩnh Tế Canal
Result	Vietnamese victory, Cambodian–Siamese attacks repelled

Belligerents
Rattanakosin Kingdom (Siam); Pro-Siamese Cambodian faction	Nguyễn dynasty (Vietnam)

Commanders and leaders
Hà Tiên naval front Kromma Khun Itsaret Rangsan; Chameun Waiworanat Chuang Bunnag; Phraya Ratchawangsan Nok; Phraya Aphaiphiphit Kratai; Phraya Phichai Ronnarit; Oknha Sena Anchit Kan; Vĩnh Tế canal front Chaophraya Bodindecha; Chaophraya Yommaraj Bunnak; Phraya Aphai Songkhram †; Phra Phromborirak Kaew; Preah Angkev Ma †; Phra Narinyotha Nong; Ang Duong; Oknha Mohasena Tan †	Lê Văn Đức; Lê Văn Phú; An Giang front Phạm Văn Điển; Nguyễn Công Trứ; Nguyễn Công Nhàn; Nguyễn Lương Nhàn; Đoàn Quang Mật; Hà Tiên front Đoàn Văn Sách; Lương Văn Liễu; Trần Văn Thông; Đinh Văn Huy; Mai Văn Tích

Units involved
Hà Tiên naval front: Siamese levies from Central and Eastern Siam; Khmer levies from Kampot; Vĩnh Tế canal front: Khmer–Lao–Siamese levies	Imperial Vietnamese Army; Nam Kỳ (Cochinchinese) regiments

Strength
Siamese naval forces attacking Hà Tiên; 7,000 men Khmer levies from Kampot; 2,000 men Khmer-Lao-Siamese forces attacking Vĩnh Tế canal 11,900 men Total: 20,900 men	An Giang province 5,000 men Hà Tiên; 4,600 men Total: 9,600 men

Casualties and losses
1,200 Siamese killed at Choan Chum	2,000 killed

=== Siamese preparation ===
Nguyễn Công Trứ the Tuần phủ sub-governor of An Giang and Lương Văn Liễu the Tuần phủ governor of Hà Tiên were very vigilant on observing and speculating the incoming Siamese invasion on Southern Vietnam. In January 1842, the spies told Lương Văn Liễu the Siamese were planning to fill up to obliterate the Vĩnh Tế canal and to send Preah Angkev Ma to attack Hà Tiên. The spies also reported that the Siamese navy had been anchoring at Koh Rong Island near Kampong Saom in the Gulf of Siam. Nguyễn Công Trứ, upon being informed about this report, hurriedly marched from Châu Đốc (An Giang) to defend Hà Tiên. Nguyễn Văn Chương (Nguyễn Trí Phương) also marched from Vĩnh Long to defend Hà Tiên. However, the Siamese navy had not yet come to attack so Nguyễn Công Trứ and Nguyễn Văn Chương returned to their bases at Châu Đốc and Vĩnh Long, respectively.

In January 1842, Chaophraya Bodindecha the Siamese supreme commander in Cambodia at Phnom Penh, who was 67 years old by that time, became ill and was unable to command battles. Chaophraya Bodindecha then asked the Siamese King Rama III or King Nangklao to send a new commander to act as the supreme commander in Cambodia during Bodindecha's illness. The Siamese king Rama then sent Chaophraya Yommaraj Bunnak to take care of Cambodian affairs during Bodindecha's sick leave. Chaophraya Yommaraj Bunnak arrived in Phnom Penh in late January 1842. Due to Bodindecha's illness, the Siamese attack on the Vietnamese Vĩnh Tế canal in 1842 would be led by Yommaraj Bunnak rather than by Bodindecha.

The Siamese king Rama then dispatched the Siamese navy under his younger half-brother Prince Kromma Khun Itsaret Rangsan (later became Vice-King Pinklao) and Chameun Waiworanat Chuang Bunnag (son of Chaophraya Phrakhlang Dit Bunnag who had earlier led the Siamese navy to attack Hà Tiên previously during 1833–1834). Both the Prince Itsaret Rangsan and Chuang Bunnag were enthusiasts of the Anglo-American culture. Both Chuang Bunnag and the prince learned about Western shipbuilding and in the 1830s they constructed the first native Siamese-made Western-style masted rigged ships, all these ships had British seafarers as captains and Chinese merchants as navigators. Though these ships were largely intended for merchantile purposes, the Siamese king Nangklao utilized these massive Western-style ships in naval warfare against Vietnam. Prince Itsaret Rangsan would board on the barque Fairy (Thai name: Phuttha-amnat) as the supreme naval commander, while Chuang Bunnag would board on the ship Thepkosin as vanguard. Other Western-style ships employed in this campaign to attack Hà Tiên included the barque Sir Walter Scott (Ratcharit), the ship Victory (Witthayakhom) and the brig Lion (Udomdet).

Apart from these Western-style sailing vessels, the Siamese also employed Vietnamese-style fort-warships, which King Nangklao ordered to be constructed to imitate the Vietnamese warships themselves. These Vietnamese-style warships were commanded by Phraya Ratchawangsan Nok the commander of Krom Asa Cham or Malay naval regiment serving under Siam. Prince Itsaret Rangsan and the main cadres of the Siamese navy fleet left Bangkok on 24 January 1842 with 2,000 men, saling along the Eastern Siamese coast towards Chanthaburi, aiming for Hà Tiên. Phraya Aphaiphiphit Kratai then conscripted 5,000 Eastern Siamese men from Chonburi, Rayong, Chanthaburi and Trat to join the expedition, stacking up to 7,000 Siamese men in the navy.

In early February 1842, Nguyễn Công Trứ the sub-governor of An Giang caught the entire Siamese plan to attack Hà Tiên and to destroy the Vĩnh Tế canal. Vietnamese spies told Nguyễn Công Trứ that the Siamese intended to obstruct Vĩnh Tế canal in order to isolate Hà Tiên from being reinforced by Châu Đốc. Nguyễn Công Trứ reported this Siamese attack plan to Emperor Thiệu Trị at Huế but the Vietnamese Emperor had been weary of all the Cambodian affairs and had been planning to go on his imperial inspection trip to Northern Vietnam in the upcoming Vietnamese New Year. Thiệu Trị regarded this report as exaggerating and reprimanded Nguyễn Công Trứ for being too anxious and panicking. Thiệu Trị simply told Nguyễn Công Trứ to put down the Khmers at the Thất Sơn Mountains and everything would be fine.

=== Siamese assault on Hà Tiên ===
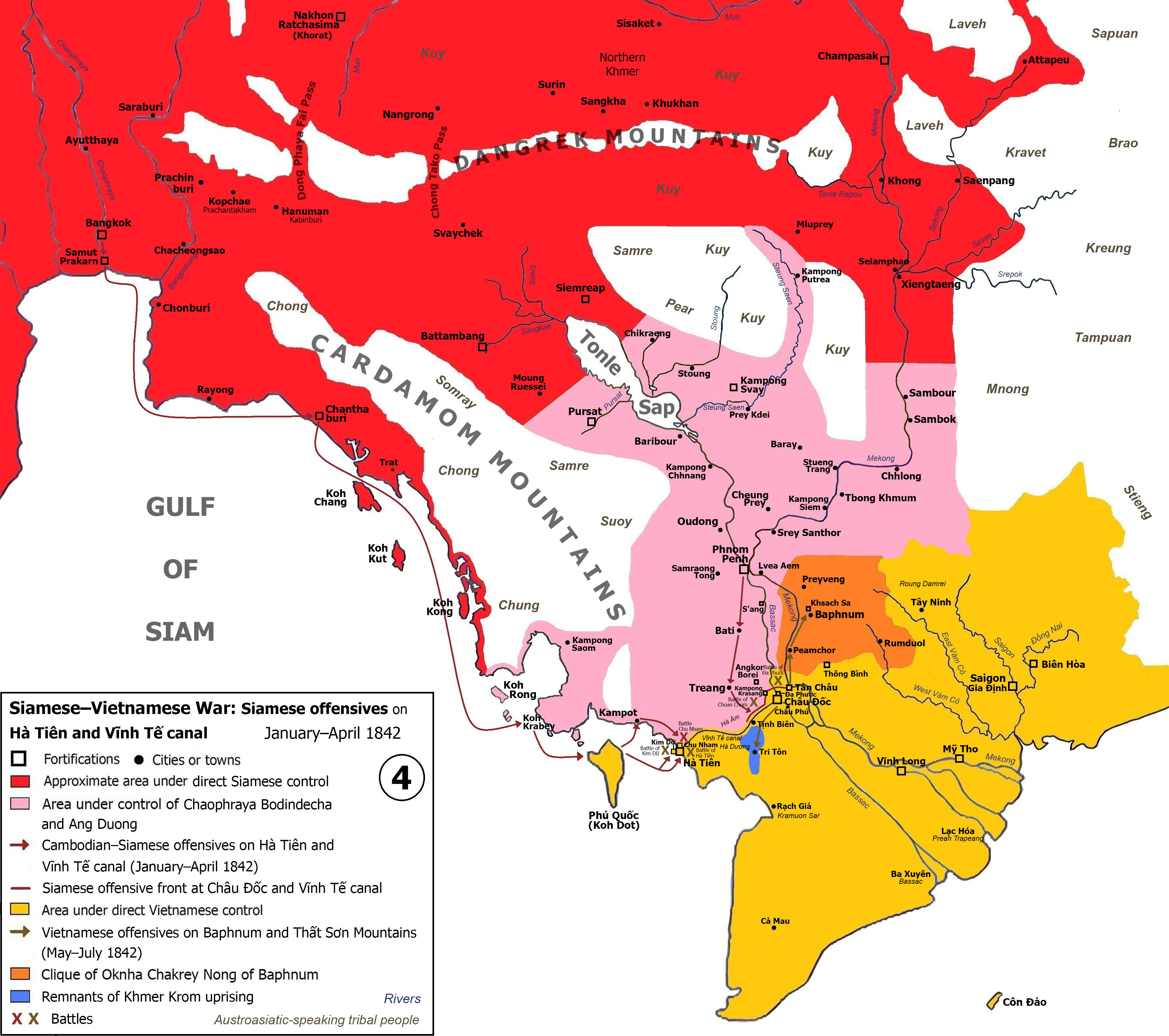
Siamese offensives on Hà Tiên and Vĩnh Tế canal: January–April 1842 Siamese prince Itsaret Rangsan and his assistant Chuang Bunnag led the Siamese navy force from Bangkok to attack the Vietnamese port of Hà Tiên, while Chaophraya Yommarat Bunnak and Ang Duong led Cambodian–Siamese land forces from Phnom Penh to attack the Vĩnh Tế canal. However, this campaign ended in Siamese defeat as Vietnamese commanders Đoàn Văn Sách repelled the Siamese from Hà Tiên in March 1842 and Phạm Văn Điển repelled the Cambodians–Siamese from Vĩnh Tế canal at Châu Đốc in April 1842.

Prince Kromma Khun Itsaret Rangsan, a younger half-brother of the Siamese king Nangklao, was the Siamese supreme naval commander of this campaign as his naval forces left Bangkok on 24 January 1842. The prince and his Siamese navy, composing of Vietnamese-style and Western-style warships, reached Chanthaburi on Eastern Siamese coast in late January 1842. Prince Itsaret Rangsan sent Phraya Ratchawangsan Nok and Phraya Phichai Ronnarit as vanguard, proceeding to Phú Quốc Island.

In mid-February 1842, Lương Văn Liễu the governor of Hà Tiên spotted 93 Siamese warships arriving in Phú Quốc Island. Emperor Thiệu Trị, however, dismissed the report as insignificant and reprimanded Lương Văn Liễu for being panic-stirring. The Siamese indeed attacked Phú Quốc. Phan Văn Giảng the Vietnamese commander in Phú Quốc decided to abandon his post due to the overwhelming number of Siamese navy. Phraya Ratchawangsan and Phraya Phichai Ronnarit, the Siamese vanguard commanders, arrived at Thiển Môn beach in Phú Quốc with 40-50 Vietnamese-style warships and a Western-style ship and found the Vietnamese fort to be empty with only around 300 human-figure dummies. The Siamese then burnt down the Vietnamese base in Phú Quốc. Prince Itsaret Rangsan the Siamese supreme commander arrived and took position at the Phú Quốc Island. The prince sent Phraya Aphaiphiphit Kratai to carry rice on a Western-style brig to deliver the rice to Chaophraya Bodindecha at Phnom Penh through the Cambodian seaport of Kampot. 2,000 Khmer men from Kampot under Oknha Sena Anchit Kan the Cambodian governor of Kampot were also levied to join this campaign.

Thiệu Trị assigned Nguyễn Công Trứ from Châu Đốc and Đoàn Văn Sách from Vĩnh Long to bring reinforcements to Hà Tiên. Thiệu Trị also commanded all governors in Cochinchina (Southern Vietnam) including Nguyễn Văn Chương the governor of Vĩnh Long and Lê Văn Đức the governor of Saigon to allocate their forces to defend Hà Tiên against possible Siamese attack. Nguyễn Công Trứ left Đoàn Văn Sách to defend Hà Tiên and Nguyễn Công Trứ himself patrolled Mekong against possible Siamese invasion from the Mekong Delta. Emperor Thiệu Trị left the imperial citadel of Huế on 3 March 1842 to embark on his trip to Northern Vietnam.

There were around 5,000 fighting men in Hà Tiên, according to Thai estimate. Hà Tiên is a Southern Vietnamese seaport surrounded by mountains. Two main forts protecting Hà Tiên from this Siamese attack were;

- Chu Nham fort on modern Núi Đá Dựng Mountain, about fifteen kilometers to the north of Hà Tiên
- Kim Dữ fort on a mountain on a promontary, about three kilometers to the west of Hà Tiên

Vietnamese commanders and officials in Hà Tiên by the time of Siamese attack were;

- Lương Văn Liễu the Tuần phủ governor of Hà Tiên
- Trần Văn Thông the Bố chính sub-governor of Hà Tiên
- Đinh Văn Huy the Án sát or Chief Judge of Hà Tiên
- Mai Văn Tích the Lãnh binh military commander of Hà Tiên

In preparation against the incoming Siamese assault, Mai Văn Tích brought 1,000 men to guard the Hà Tiên seafront at the mouth of Giang Thành River, Đinh Văn Huy brought 200 men to guard the Kim Dữ fort mountain to the west of Hà Tiên, Lương Văn Liễu and Trần Văn Thông the governor and vice-governor of Hà Tiên were with 3,400 men in the city.

The Siamese prince and naval commander Itsaret Rangsan (called Ô Thiệt Vương or Prince Ô Thiệt in Đại Nam thực lục), who hed been taking position at Phú Quốc, initiated the attack on Hà Tiên on 10 March 1842 as he commanded Chamuen Waiworanat Chuang Bunnag (called Ca La Hâm in Vietnamese, from "Kalahom") to lead the Siamese navy to attack Hà Tiên by sea and Phraya Aphaiphiphit Kratai to lead the Cambodian–Siamese forces from Kampot to attack Hà Tiên by land. Next day, on March 11, Chuang Bunnag sent Phraya Ratchawangsan Nok to attack Hà Tiên at the seafront and Phraya Phichaironnarit to attack the Kim Dữ fort.

=== Siamese attack on Vĩnh Tế canal ===
As the Siamese navy fleet was attacking Hà Tiên, Chaophraya Bodindecha the Siamese supreme commander in Cambodia, who had been in illness, sent his second-in-command Chaophraya Yommarat Bunnak, along with his son Phra Phromborirak and the Cambodian Prince Ang Duong himself, to bring the multiethnic Lao-Khmer-Siamese forces of 11,900 men from Phnom Penh down south to take position at Choan Chum on the northern bank of the Vĩnh Tế canal, known as Hà Âm district by the Vietnamese, at modern Cambodian–Vietnamese border. Earlier, Nguyễn Văn Chương had built forts along the Vĩnh Tế canal, the Siamese also established ten forts along the length of Vĩnh Tế canal, about 2.4 kilometers from the Vietnamese forts protecting the canal. Siamese field commanders included Phra Phromborirak (son of Bodindecha) and Phraya Aphaisongkhram. Siam-aligned Cambodian leaders included Preah Angkev Ma (uncle of Princess Ang Pen), Phraya Nuphaptraiphop the Siam-appointed governor of Siemreap and Phra Narinyotha Nong the vice-governor of Battambang.

The Siamese began to build stockades on 17 March 1842. The Siamese faced a rough start as the Vietnamese forts along the Vĩnh Tế canal keep shooting at the Siamese, who struggled to build forts in the middle of Vietnamese gunfire. It took four days for the Siamese to establish the whole defense line, stretching from Tịnh Biên to the west to Tân Châu to the east, on the Cambodian (northern) side of the canal, about forty kilometers in total, finishing on March 21.

=== Battle of Hà Tiên (March 1842) ===
Chameun Waiworanat Chuang Bunnag the Siamese commander at the Hà Tiên naval front sent his subordinates to attack Hà Tiên on 11 March 1842;

- Phraya Ratchawangsan Nok the commander of Krom Asa Cham or Malay Naval regiment, with Vietnamese-style fort warships, attacked Hà Tiên at the seafront at the mouth of Giang Thành River.
- Phraya Phichai Ronnarit attacked the fort of Kim Dữ to the west of Hà Tiên.

Meanwhile, the Eastern Siamese forces under Phraya Aphaiphiphit Kratai and Khmer forces under Oknha Sena Anchit Kan of Kampot, total of 2,600 men, marched from Kampot to attack the Chu Nham fort north of Hà Tiên.

Đoàn Văn Sách and Đinh Văn Huy defended the Kim Dữ fort against Phraya Phichai Ronnarit, while Lương Văn Liễu and Trần Văn Thông defended Hà Tiên seafront against Phraya Ratchawangsan. The Siamese brought their cannon onto the high grounds on the mountains to fire cannon shots into the Hà Tiên citadel, inflicting damages.

The battle continues for eleven days and, despite numerical inferiority, the Vietnamese defenders of Hà Tiên prevailed as the Siamese were unable to make any progresses. Siamese warships were broken and dead bodies of Siamese soldiers were scattering and piling up on the fronts. Chameun Waiworanat Chuang Bunnag interrogated a captured Vietnamese man and found out that the governor of Hà Tiên (Lương Văn Liễu) had sent a letter asking for reinforcements from the governor of Saigon (Lê Văn Đức). On 22 March 1842, realizing the desperate situation of the Siamese, Chuang Bunnag left Hà Tiên to visit Prince Itsaret Rangsan to discuss plans. Prince Itsaret Rangsan pointed out that the Southwestern monsoon was getting stronger and this might damage precious the Siamese Western-style ships. Reinforcements from Saigon would make things harder for the Siamese. The prince decided that if the Siamese did not manage to conquer Hà Tiên before the advent of the Western monsoon season, the Siamese would be obliged to retreat to Kampong Saom.

Next day, on 23 March 1842, there was a strong wind coming from the West. The Siamese attackers on Hà Tiên were compelled to retreat or else their ships would be wrecked due to strong winds. The Siamese retreated from Hà Tiên, both at the seafront and at Kim Dữ fort, in the middle of the night and the defending Vietnamese pursued them, capturing some of the Siamese weapons. Siamese naval commanders at Hà Tiên, Phraya Ratchawangsan and Phraya Phichai Ronnarit, retreated to take position at the Hà Tiên Islands to shelter from the monsoon. Despite Siamese naval retreat from Hà Tiên, the Cambodian–Siamese forces under Phraya Aphaiphiphit Kratai persisted in attacking the Chu Nham fort north of Hà Tiên. The Khmers under Oknha Sena Anchit of Kampot successfully seized Chu Nham for on 27 March 1842. (The Khmers of Kampot had earlier seized the Chu Nham fort in October 1840 but eventually retreated.)

=== Battle of Choan Chum (April 1842) ===
Vietnamese Emperor Thiệu Trị, who was in Ninh Binh province during his journey to Northern Vietnam, was informed on 26 March 1842 about the Siamese naval attack on Hà Tiên. Thiệu Trị was furious and he appointed Lê Văn Đức the Tổng đốc Định Biên governor of Gia Định and Biên Hòa provinces, technically the governor of Saigon, to be the Tổng thống quân vụ (總統軍務) or Vietnamese supreme commander of this campaign to repel Siamese invasion. Lê Văn Phú, an official from Huế, was appointed to be Lê Văn Đức's assistant as Tham tán Đại thần (參贊大臣).

On the An Giang front, the Siamese and the Cambodians had established a line of stockades and fortresses stretching from Tịnh Biên to the west to Tân Châu to the east along the Vĩnh Tế canal. The Siamese attacked many Vietnamese fortresses surrounding Châu Đốc (administrative center of the An Giang province) including Tân Châu (to the east of Châu Đốc), Đa Phước (to the north of Châu Đốc facing the Cambodian side) and Kampong Krasang (to the west of Châu Đốc). In late March 1842, Nguyễn Công Trứ the sub-governor of An Giang reported to Thiệu Trị that, even though the Siamese navy had retreated from Hà Tiên, they were stilling anchoring at Kampot and Kampong Saom, threatening Hà Tiên. Nguyễn Công Trứ pointed out that the Vietnamese had to face two-pronged attack from the Siamese both at An Giang and Hà Tiên. Nguyễn Công Trứ proposed that they should withdraw all forces from Hà Tiên in order to defend Châu Đốc. Thiệu Trị did not agree to this proposal, saying that the Siamese had just been repelled from Hà Tiên and there were no reasons to retreat. Nguyễn Công Trứ then fell ill and was replaced by Nguyễn Công Nhàn in his dutues.

In early April 1842, 3,000 Cambodian–Siamese men from the line attacked Đa Phước, which was just opposite of Châu Đốc on the Bassac River. Phạm Văn Điển sent 1,000 Vietnamese men to successfully repel this Siamese attack. Phạm Văn Điển singled out to attack the Siamese on the left bank of the Bassac River first. Lương Văn Liễu the governor of Hà Tiên told Phạm Văn Điển the Tổng đốc An Hà or viceroy of An Giang and Hà Tiên provinces, technically supreme governor in Châu Đốc, that the Siamese had retreated from Hà Tiên but they were still anchoring on the Phú Quốc Island. Lương Văn Liễu asked Phạm Văn Điển for more reinforcements from An Giang. Phạm Văn Điển, however, thought that the Vietnamese should repel the Siamese from An Giang and Vĩnh Tế canal first in order to be able to defend Hà Tiên.

There were around 5,000 Vietnamese fighting men in the An Giang province. Phạm Văn Điển (known as Ong Tian Lueak in Thai chronicles, from Kinh lược, his former position in Trấn Tây administration) planned a three-pronged attack on the Siamese line;

- Đoàn Quang Mật would lead 1,500 Vietnamese men to attack the Siamese line on the left side.
- Nguyễn Lương Nhàn would lead 600 Vietnamese men to attack the Siamese line on the right side.
- Nguyễn Công Nhàn would lead 1,300 Vietnamese men to attack the Siamese line in the middle.

On 7 April 1842, Prince Itsaret Rangsan the Siamese supreme commander and his aide Chuang Bunnag decided to retreat the Siamese navy forces from Phú Quốc to Kampong Saom. In the night of the same day, from the night of April 7 to the morning of April 8, Phạm Văn Điển sent Đoàn Quang Mật, Nguyễn Lương Nhàn and Nguyễn Công Nhàn to lead Vietnamese forces to attack the Cambodian–Siamese forts at Choan Chum all along the Vĩnh Tế canal during the night. The Siamese and the Cambodians were mostly unprepared, caught off guard, as the Vietnamese staged the surprise attack. In this Battle of Choan Chum, the Vietnamese prevailed as the Cambodians and the Siamese suffered defeat with great losses and casualties.

1,200 Siamese and 2,000 Cambodian men were killed in this battle, with seven Cambodians–Siamese commanders lost their lives. The Vietnamese seized a large number of Siamese muskets, guns, ammunitions and a Western-style large-barrel cannon. Siamese commander Phraya Aphaisongkhram was killed in battle. Preah Angkev Ma, uncle of Princess Ang Pen, was killed in battle. Oknha Mohasena Tan and some other pro-Thai Cambodian Oknhas were also killed in this battle. Chaophraya Yommaraj Bunnak the Siamese supreme commander and his son Saeng was standing next to each other when Vietnamese bullets came in. Saeng was immediately killed by the bullet but another bullet hit the metallic button of the shirt of Yommaraj Bunnak, saving his life but not his son's. Luang Raksathep, a Siamese commander, pretended to be dead as the Vietnamese cut off his two ear pinnae for reward. Luang Raksathep then walked back without his ears. The Siamese were thus repelled from Vĩnh Tế canal. Vietnamese victory and Siamese defeat in this Battle of Choan Chum in April 1842 was the most devastating and humiliating Siamese defeat since the Battle of Vàm Nao River in January 1834.

=== Siamese retreat ===
Prince Itsaret Rangsan the Siamese supreme naval commander, along with Chamuen Waiworanat Chuang Bunnag, left Phú Quốc on 7 April 1842, retreating to Kampong Saom. The prince retreated further to Chanthaburi on Eastern Siamese coast, while Chuang Bunnag took his Western-style ships to unload rice at Kampot. From Kampot, rice was transported in small boats to Chaophraya Bodindecha at Phnom Penh. However, the rice carried by the Siamese ships was too abundant and it would take a very long time to unload all of the rice to the Siamese headquarter at Phnom Penh. Chuang Bunnag at Kampot also risked facing Vietnamese retaliatory attack from Hà Tiên. Chuang Bunnag decided to abandon the rice-transporting mission and retreated from Kampot on 30 April 1842, going back to Chanthaburi. Eventually, the Prince Itsaret Rangsan, Chuang Bunnag and the Siamese navy forces returned to Bangkok.

Phạm Văn Điển, securing the glorious victory over the Siamese and the Cambodians at Choan Chum, called Hà Âm district by the Vietnamese, returned to Châu Đốc on April 10. Phạm Văn Điển called the pro-Vietnamese Cambodian prince Ang Em to inspect all the Siamese guns, cannons and other weapons seized from the battle. On 15 April 1842, Phạm Văn Điển, along with Nguyễn Công Nhàn and Ang Em, marched Vietnamese armies from Châu Đốc to subjugate the remaining Khmer Krom insurgents at the Thất Sơn Mountains, at Mount Núi Cấm (called Phnom Po Piel in Khmer) and Núi Dài. The Khmer Kroms of Thất Sơn Mountains were subjugated by the Vietnamese. The Vietnamese Emperor Thiệu Trị, who had been in Hanoi on his inspection trip to Northern Vietnam, was informed in late April 1842 about Vietnamese victories over the Siamese invaders in Southern Vietnam and was delighted. Thiệu Trị left Hanoi on 9 May 1842 and returned to the imperial citadel of Huế on May 21.

Siamese defeats at the hands of the Vietnamese at Hà Tiên and Vĩnh Tế canal were setbacks for Siam, while the Vietnamese were gaining upper hand, even though the Siamese still controlled most of Cambodia. Vietnamese retaliatory attack from Southern Vietnam towards the Siamese-controlled Phnom Penh was highly likely. When the invading Siamese burnt down the Cambodian royal capital of Oudong in 1813, the pro-Vietnamese king Ang Chan of Cambodia moved the royal capital to Phnom Penh. Phnom Penh located lowland on the riverside. In case of Siamese attack, the Vietnamese riparian fleet would quickly and conveniently come to defend Ang Chan. For this very same reason, Chaophraya Bodindecha the Siamese supreme commander in Cambodia, who had been taking position in Phnom Penh since December 1841, found Phnom Penh to be very susceptible to the prospective Vietnamese attack. Bodindecha then decided to bring Ang Duong back to Oudong in May 1842, while leaving 5,000 Lao men and 3,000 Cambodian men to guard Phnom Penh against Vietnam for Bodindecha. The Siamese also dismantled in May 1842 the Trấn Tây citadel in Phnom Penh, built by the Vietnamese in 1835 to impose Vietnamese authority over Cambodia – the symbol of Vietnamese rule in Cambodia. Bodindecha built two new fortresses at Phnom Penh, another two at Po Preah Bat or Slaket opposite of Phnom Penh on the Bassac River and put Lao and Cambodian garrisons into these fortresses to guard.

Chaophraya Bodindecha had been contemplating constructing a new fortress for Ang Duong at Ponhea Lueu, which Bodindecha found to be a strategically defensible position against Vietnamese attack from the rivers, in the southern vicinity of Oudong. In May 1842, Chaophraya Bodindecha assigned his second-in-command Chaophraya Yommaraj Bunnak to lead 3,000 Khmer–Lao–Siamese men to build a new fortress at Ponhea Lueu for Ang Duong to reside.

== Second Truce: 1842–1845 ==
=== Further Vietnamese suppression of Khmer Krom rebellion ===
After the Vietnamese victories over the invading Siamese at Hà Tiên and Vĩnh Tế canal, the meritorious Vietnamese commanders died from illnesses in rapid succession. After repelling the Siamese from Hà Tiên in late March 1842, Đoàn Văn Sách fell ill and returned to recuperate at Châu Đốc. Đoàn Văn Sách died in late May 1842. Emperor Thiệu Trị was greatly affected and saddened by the death of Đoàn Văn Sách, who had just secured a Vietnamese victory over the Siamese and whom Thiệu Trị considered one of his most brilliant and courageous generals. Thiệu Trị personally mourned for Đoàn Văn Sách, stating that "A thousand of gold is easy to find but a [brilliant] general is hard to find.", refusing to see a visiting Qing dynasty official. Thiệu Trị praised Đoàn Văn Sách for his military achievements; from his defense of Stoung and Chikraeng from Siamese attack during November–December 1840 in the reign of Minh Mạng to his brave defense of Hà Tiên from Siamese naval attack in March 1842. Đinh Văn Huy the Judge of Hà Tiên also died from illness.

In late May 1842, Thiệu Trị commanded Lê Văn Đức the Tổng đốc Định Biên or governor of Saigon, whom Thiệu Trị had appointed as Tổng thống quân vụ or Supreme Commander of the campaign against Cambodia–Siam and Phạm Văn Điển, who was the Tổng đốc An Hà commander at Châu Đốc, to bring Vietnamese forces to attack the independent Khmer warlord clique of Oknha Chakrey Nong, who since 1840 had been maintaining his independent faction not submitting to Siam nor Vietnam, whose clique was based at Khsach Sa (Sách Sô, modern Reaks Chey, Ba Phnum District) near Ba Phnum in Southeastern Cambodia.

Also in late May 1842, Lê Văn Đức, Phạm Văn Điển and Nguyễn Công Nhàn led Vietnamese forces from Gia Định and An Giang provinces to subjugate the still remaining Khmer Krom rebels at the Thất Sơn Mountains, at Mount Núi Tượng. However, during this campaign, Phạm Văn Điển fell ill and had to return to Châu Đốc to recuperate, where he soon died in late May 1842. Another Vietnamese general died from illness. Phạm Văn Điển had routed the Cambodian–Siamese forces from Vĩnh Tế canal in April 1842. Thiệu Trị then appointed Nguyễn Công Nhàn to be the new Tổng đốc An Hà or governor of An Giang (Châu Đốc) and Hà Tiên provinces to replace Phạm Văn Điển.

In June 1842, Lê Văn Đức the Tổng đốc Định Biên, along with Nguyễn Văn Chương (Nguyễn Trí Phương) the Tổng đốc Long Tường and Nguyễn Công Nhàn the Tổng đốc An Hà, the three top Vietnamese governors of Cochinchina, led Southern Vietnamese forces to subjugate the last Khmer Krom stronghold at Tri Tôn near Mount Núi Cô Tô. Thousands of Khmer Kroms and Chinese immigrants were captured for their rebellious activities. Presence of the pro-Vietnamese Cambodian prince Ang Em swayed a large number of Khmer Kroms to yield and submit to Vietnam. Ang Em was able to persuade 2,700 Khmer Krom men to lay down their arms and surrender. Lê Văn Đức assigned Nguyễn Văn Chương to mob up any remaining resistances as Lê Văn Đức himself and Nguyễn Công Nhàn sailed down the Vĩnh Tế canal to check for the seaport of Hà Tiên. When Lê Văn Đức saw that the Siamese had totally retreated and Hà Tiên was safe, Lê Văn Đức returned to Châu Đốc.

In July 1842, Lê Văn Đức, Nguyễn Văn Chương and Nguyễn Công Nhàn brought 6,000 Southern Vietnamese men from Tân Châu to sail upstream along the Mekong to attack Oknha Chakrey Nong at Ba Phnum. The Cambodians under Oknha Chakrey Nong did not face the Vietnamese in battle, instead retreating to cover themselves in the forests. Not facing Cambodian resistances, the Vietnamese simply burnt down Ba Phnum and returned.

=== Thiệu Trị's plan to reconquer Cambodia ===
Vietnamese victories over the Siamese at Hà Tiên and Vĩnh Tế canal emboldened the Vietnamese Emperor Thiệu Trị, who became interested in Cambodia again and began to put some hope into the prospect of reclaiming Cambodia into Vietnamese domination. Thiệu Trị learned that the pro-Vietnamese Cambodian prince Ang Em was able to persuade thousands of Khmer Krom rebels to surrender and submit to Vietnam and saw that Ang Em could potentially be a Vietnam-sponsored candidate for the Cambodian throne to rally the Khmers in Cambodia under Siamese domination to shift their allegiance to Vietnam. In July 1842, Thiệu Trị commanded Lê Văn Đức to bring Vietnamese forces from Nam Kỳ (Cochinchina, Southern Vietnam) and Tả kỳ (Southeastern Vietnam) to reconquer Cambodia and to possibly proceed to attack Siam itself;

If it is possible to take advantage of the opportunity [of Siamese defeats] to bring victorious troops to attack and reorganize the territory [of Trấn Tây Cambodia], then it should be sent immediately to keep up with the affair. If the [Southern Vietnamese] soldiers are tired after a long time [of fighting] and the [Cambodian] territory is vast, if it is not possible to pacify them in a short time, if there is a need to find another way to use Khmers to fight the Khmers, then it is the right time to use Yểm (Ang Em). If he is truly devoted to the [Vietnamese] court, think of a way to repay him and then consider assigning him a few thousands of Khmer soldiers to command, recruit two more units of troops from Nam Kỳ and Tả kỳ and choose one Lãnh binh or Quản vệ who is capable of this mission, let him supervise, send him to the localities of Nam Ninh (Ba Phnum), Nam Thái (Rumduol), Nghi Hoà (Bati) and Phong Nhương (Samraong Tong) to recruit the Khmers. Wait until a large number of [Khmer] people submit, then let Yểm (Ang Em) be the leader. We will cut off a piece of land to make a fence to protect against the outsiders and to delineate prefectures and districts. Then set up forts right at dangerous places, let the soldiers rest and recuperate for a few years. When the internal affairs [of Cambodia] becomes unstable, we will make a big trip to take over the whole Trấn Tây and then to go straight to the border of Siam, then attack so fiercely that they will never dare to cause us troubles again.

Thiệu Trị's grand plan to reconquer Cambodia involved sending Southern Vietnamese troops directly into Cambodia or if the Vietnamese were too exhausted, Ang Em should be deployed to persuade the Cambodians to break away from the dominating Siamese. Thiệu Trị considered assigning Ang Em thousands of Khmer men and making Ang Em the King of Cambodia under Vietnamese auspices. This plan was to be coupled by the supposed Cambodian fallout with the Siamese and the Vietnamese would take this upcoming opportunity to reclaim control over Cambodia, restoring the Trấn Tây province and setting up districts to govern Cambodia under Vietnamese rule again, like when the Siamese took advantage of Cambodian uprising against Vietnam in 1840 to attack and reclaim Cambodia. Thiệu Trị even went further in his plan to bring forces to attack Siam itself.

Lê Văn Đức, who was the Tham tán Đại thần or Deputy Governor-General of Trấn Tây during the general Cambodian uprising against Vietnamese rule in 1840, saw any Vietnamese attempts to reestablish direct rule over Cambodia as futile and impractical. Lê Văn Đức wrote a long essay to dissuade Emperor Thiệu Trị from the idea of reconquest of Cambodia;

The Lạp Man (臘蠻) dared to be bold because they relied on the Siamese. After being killed by the [Vietnamese] imperial army, on sea they had to flee far away in midnight, on land they were defeated in a crushing battle, the Siamese and the Khmers must have lose their nerves and become worried. Now, if we take advantage of the victory and attack Trấn Tây, the enemy armies will swarm like bees and ants and will be frightened by the sound of winds and cranes. They may scatter without fighting. However, considering the situation carefully, when they realized the situation, it will not be difficult to fight but it will be difficult to hold on. Let me speak from the enemy's perspective; The entire Trấn Tây region was originally called Lạp Man. Most of them have been accustomed to being stubborn, cunning, deceitful, fickle and irregular. In the past, although Cambodia was dependent on us but it was only in name. They have forgotten our favors, considering us enemies and have become like riding on a fierce tiger. Now, we want to entice and comfort them to stay but their stubborn nature makes them unreliable. We want to establish [Cambodian] land as districts and prefectures, to incorporate [Khmer] people as soldiers and civilians, which is absolutely not possible! Moreover, the terrain of that land is twice as large as the six provinces of Nam Kỳ. If we use troops to swiftly attack them from the east, they will hide in the west, filling this place and leaving another place open. How can we destroy them in one battle? Even if we win every battles, how can we keep every places?

Thiệu Trị conceded to Lê Văn Đức's plea about the impracticality of reconquest of Cambodia. Thiệu Trị also thought that another Vietnamese campaign in Cambodia would put burden on Southern Vietnamese people, who had become weary of all the mobilization and instability in past years. In July 1842, Thiệu Trị decreed to Southern Vietnamese people that the border situation with Cambodia had become stable and the Southern Vietnamese should continue their normal lives. In August 1842, Thiệu Trị recalled Lê Văn Đức the governor of Saigon back to Huế and appointed Lê Văn Đức's deputy Lê Văn Phú to be the new Tổng đốc Định Biên or governor of Saigon, Gia Định and Biên Hòa provinces to replace Lê Văn Đức.

=== Siamese–Vietnamese stalemate ===
Chameun Waiworanat Chuang Bunnag was able to deliver less than the half of the rice carried from Bangkok to Chaophraya Bodindecha at Phnom Penh (Bodindecha later moved to Oudong.) through the Cambodian seaport of Kampot due to the lack of riparian vessels to transport rice from Kampot to Phnom Penh in large quantities. Chuang Bunnag decided to terminate his rice delivery mission due to this limitation in April 1842 and returned to Bangkok with the rest of the undelivered rice. Failure of Chuang Bunnag to deliver rice to Chaophraya Bodindecha resulted in the rice shortage of the Siamese armies in Cambodia, which consisted of Siamese, Lao and Khmer ethnicities. Since the Cambodian uprising against Vietnamese rule in September 1840, Cambodia had been in state of warfare and agriculture was not possible. There had virtually been no agricultural production in Cambodia for two years since then, resulting in famine and severe rice shortage in Cambodia. Khmer people and Khmer Buddhist monks had to go into the forests to dig for roots and tubers to eat. In June 1842, Chaophraya Bodindecha reported to the Siamese king Rama III or King Nangklao that around 1,000 of Lao, Khmer and Siamese men in his armies had died from starvation. Bodindecha had to send Siamese officials to buy rice from Laos. Upon learning about this situation, the Siamese king became angry, saying that he had already speculated that this would happen due to the ongoing state of warfare in Cambodia. King Rama was also angry at Siamese generals and commanders, who had failed in their mission to conquer Hà Tiên, Vĩnh Tế canal and to deliver rice supply to Bodindecha. In his reply to Bodindecha, the Siamese king expressed his frustration;

The [Siamese] navy did not manage to deliver even the half of rice and salt [transported from Bangkok] at Kampot, bringing the rice and salt back to Bangkok. He (Chuang Bunnag) made an excuse that there were no small vessels to transport the rice into the mouth of Kampot River (Preaek Tuek Chhu River). The arranged affair of the campaign [to attack Southern Vietnam] had also failed. They (Siamese navy) were too alarmed by the news [of Vietnamese reinforcements] and prematurely retreated, even though the land forces were still engaging [at Vĩnh Tế canal]. The land armies, even though having large numbers, did not think of any timely offensive moves against the Vietnamese. They simply stood there awkwardly, failing the campaign, like playing around for fun, not being vigilant, not being careful in the royal warfare. Chaophraya Yommarat has been a senior minister and is quite old. The Suriyawong (Bunnag) family are said to be the original royal servants but are unaware of the Vietnamese strategy. Unaware of the Vietnamese approach, the Vietnamese had reached them and they were defeated in devastation. If they were not negligent, if they were aware of the Vietnamese tactics, no matter how numerous the Vietnamese forces were, the [Siamese] forces had the advantage of being fortified. They (Siamese forces) also had guns and cannons. Even if the Vietnamese had supernatural powers like Khun Phaen, it would be an equal match and the Vietnamese would also perish at our weapons. However, they (Siamese forces) had been defeated in terrible ways. This time, I have assigned them (Siamese navy) to deliver the rice at Kampot. They were difficult and ineffective. I have been tired of the incompetency of the [Siamese] commanders.

Even though the Vietnamese Nguyen imperial court did not endorse the pro-Vietnamese Cambodian prince Ang Em to be their sponsored candidate to Cambodian kingship to the same degree that the Siamese court had endorsed Ang Duong, as the Vietnamese did not fully trust Ang Em due to Ang Em having been the Siam-supported candidate for a long time, Emperor Thiệu Trị did assign Ang Em to engage in a propaganda warfare against the Siamese in Cambodia. Staying at Kampong Krasang to the west of Châu Đốc, in June 1842, Ang Em sent twelve letters to persuade the Oknha nobility of Cambodia to renounce the Siamese and to shift their allegiance to Vietnam. Some of these Oknhas forwarded the letters to Ang Duong and Chaophraya Bodindecha became aware of this move of Ang Em. In July 1842, Thiệu Trị appointed Oknha Pechdechou Thiet (Mộc Tức) the former Khmer governor of Cheung Prey, who earlier in 1840 refused to arise against Vietnam, remaining loyal to Vietnam and was chastised by his fellow Oknhas, seeking refuge at Huế, to be the Phủ uý of Tịnh Biên (Moat Chruk) to rally the Khmers in Cambodia to Vietnam, in concert with Ang Em. Phủ uý was a Vietnamese rank granted to Cambodian Oknha governors.

Ang Duong and the Siamese under Chaophraya Bodindecha had controlled most parts of Cambodia, mainly on the Western half but they were yet to establish control over Eastern Cambodia. In Southeastern Cambodia, the self-proclaimed Oknha Chakrey Nong at Ba Phnum and Oknha Norea Thuppedey Mouk the governor Preyveng, who had declared himself the Kralahom, formed an independent clique, not submitting to Siam nor Vietnam. Bodindecha and Ang Duong went to Phnom Penh again to supervise construction of forts along the Bassac and Mekong Rivers to guard against Vietnamese incursions from Southern Vietnam including;

- Banteay Daek fort on the right (western) bank of Mekong in modern Banteay Daek, Kandal province
- Peam Kbal Khmer fort, which was renamed by Ang Duong as Peam Meanchey fort ("Victorious Harbor") on the left (eastern) bank of Mekong in modern Peam Ro, Prey Veng province, about twenty kilometers downstream from the Banteay Daek fort
- Preaek Touch fort in modern Leuk Daek, Kandal province, on the right bank of Mekong, about thirteen kilometers downstream from Peam Meanchey fort
- Preaek Bakday fort in modern Kouk Thlok, Takeo province, near the Vietnam-controlled Kampong Krasang

Chaophraya Bodindecha and Ang Duong called for the self-proclaimed Oknha Chakrey Nong and Oknha Kralahom Mouk to come to pay homage and swear fealty to Ang Duong at Phnom Penh. The two Oknhas initially refused and resisted. Bodindecha sent some Cambodian officials to personally escort them to Phnom Penh. Oknha Kralahom Mouk complied and come to submit to Ang Duong. Oknha Chakrey Nong of Ba Phnum, who had earlier been attacked by the Vietnamese and had been taking refuge in the forests, did not comply. Bodindecha sent his delegates to persuade Chakrey Nong three times. When Chakrey Nong finally conceded and arrive in Phnom Penh to submit to Ang Duong, Bodindecha and Ang Duong sentenced Oknha Chakrey Nong to death for his defiance, while Oknha Kralahom Muok was pardoned and was allowed to return to Preyveng. However, the Khmer populace and the Oknha nobles of Southeastern Cambodia, centered on Ba Phnum, were still hostile to Ang Duong and to the Siamese.

In September 1842, Nguyễn Công Nhàn and Nguyễn Công Trứ, the governor and sub-governor of An Giang province, reported to the Vietnamese Emperor Thiệu Trị that several thousands of the Khmer Kroms and the Chinese immigrants, who had earlier submitted to Vietnam after their rebellions, had died from starvation. Rice storage in An Giang had been released and distributed to relieve the famine. Emperor Thiệu Trị was saddened by this report and urged An Giang officials to take care of the issue. However, the rice supply in An Giang was not adequate. In November 1842, Thiệu Trị considered Lương Văn Liễu ineffective so he sacked Lương Văn Liễu from the position of Hà Tiên governor and made Nguyễn Lương Nhàn the new Tuần phủ governor of Hà Tiên. Nguyễn Công Nhàn and Nguyễn Công Trứ told Thiệu Trị that the rice storage in An Giang was not enough. Thiệu Trị ordered each of Gia Định, Vĩnh Long and Định Tường provinces to send 20,000 phương of rice (about 600 m^{3} in volume, see Vietnamese units of measurement) to relieve famine in An Giang. Thiệu Trị then asked Nguyễn Công Nhàn how Ang Em was doing and whether the Siamese were planning to attack again. Nguyễn Công Nhàn replied that the Cambodian royalty Ang Em and Ang Mey were largely peaceful without any other ambitions and the Siamese had been mostly quiet since their last defeat in April 1842.

Siamese defeats at the hands of the Vietnamese in March–April 1842 was so profound that the Siamese attack on Hà Tiên and Vĩnh Tế canal in 1842 became the last Siamese offensive into Southern Vietnam in history. (Later entry of Western colonialist powers also rendered Siamese–Vietnamese wars obsolete.) Chaophraya Bodindecha at Oudong had been very vigilant on the prospect of Vietnamese retaliatory attack but the Vietnamese had not yet come. Even though the Vietnamese were victorious, they were exhausted after many years of dealing with Cambodian uprising and Khmer Krom insurgency, especially the Southern Vietnamese. The Vietnamese were in no state to retaliate against the Siamese nor to reconquer Cambodia from the Siamese. By mid-1842, both the Siamese and the Vietnamese were exhausted in their conflicts over Cambodia, which was left in a ruinous, divided state. Depletion of manpower and resources and the famine in Cambodia and Southern Vietnam made mobilization impossible and this forced a three-year undeclared truce, from mid-1842 to mid-1845, between Siam and Vietnam over Cambodia.

In December 1842, Emperor Thiệu Trị appointed Lê Văn Đức to the position of Nam Kỳ Kinh lược đại thần (南圻經略大臣) or Military Strategist of Southern Vietnam for his prospective campaign to reclaim Cambodia. Lê Văn Đức was already ill when he left Huế for Southern Vietnam and he died on his way in Quảng Nam province. Thiệu Trị reportedly shed tears upon learning of Lê Văn Đức's death before assuming office.

=== Siamese domination over Cambodia ===
The three top ministers of Cambodia; Chauvea Tolaha Long (Trà Long), Samdech Chauponhea Hu (Nhâm Vu) and Oknha Kralahom Kinh (La Kiên) had earlier been exiled in July 1840 by Emperor Minh Mạng to three different places in Northern Vietnam. They were grounded there for nearly three years until December 1842 when Thiệu Trị ordered the three Cambodian ministers to move to Huế and later released them, allowing them to go down south to join with the Cambodian royalty Ang Em and Ang Mey in Châu Phú in the southern vicinity of Châu Đốc, where the pro-Vietnamese Cambodian royalty lived under Vietnamese protection. Even though detained by Vietnamese imperial court in Northern Vietnam for nearly three years, these three Cambodian ministers were still loyal to Vietnam. Ang Em, with support from the returning three ministers, worked on his campaign to persuade the Cambodians to break away from the Siamese and to shift their allegiance to Vietnam. Oknha Kralahom Kinh soon died from illness.

As the Vietnamese did not retaliate as expected, Chaophraya Bodindecha continued to consolidate Siamese influence in Cambodia. Bodindecha took a further step to expand into Eastern Cambodia by constructing the new Tbong Khmum fort and sent some pro-Thai Khmer forces to occupy Roung Damrei or the Vietnamese Tây Ninh province. Chaophraya Bodindecha assigned two Siamese officials Luang Phiphitsena and Phra Wichitsongkhram to guard at Tbong Khmum. Since the defection of Prince Ang Em to Vietnam, Chaophraya Bodindecha had arrived in Cambodia in January 1840 and had been staying in Cambodia as the Siamese supreme commander for three years then. In February 1843, Chaophraya Bodindecha petitioned to the Siamese King Rama or King Nangklao, asking for a permission to return to Bangkok. The Siamese king, however, gave a vague answer, saying that if Cambodia had been pacified then Bodindecha might return to Bangkok. However, if the Vietnamese threat was still plausible, Bodindecha should remained in Cambodia. Considering the royal response to his request, Bodindecha still expected a Vietnamese retaliatory attack so he decided not to return to Bangkok yet.

The Cambodian Prince Ang Em used to be the Siam-supported candidate to the Cambodian throne, having lived in Wang Chao Khamen or Cambodian Palace in Bangkok for twenty years from 1813 to 1833. Ang Em was appointed by Siam as the governor of the Siam-controlled Battambang in 1834 but he defected to Vietnamese side in December 1839. The Vietnamese Emperor Minh Mạng had Ang Em imprisoned in Huế for one year and a half until Emperor Thiệu Trị pardoned and released Ang Em in July 1841 to return to Cambodia to rally the popular Khmer support for Vietnam. Ang Em lived with his mother Neak Neang Ros, his son Prince Ang Phim and his nieces Ang Mey, Ang Peou and Ang Snguon in Châu Phú just south of Châu Đốc. Ang Em, however, died from illness at Châu Phú on 25 March 1843 at the age of 48. During 1842–1843, there was an epidemic in Southern Vietnam that killed off many Vietnamese commanders including Đoàn Văn Sách, Phạm Văn Điển, Lê Văn Đức and even the Prince Ang Em. Ang Em's mother Neak Neang Ros and Ang Em's niece Ang Mey held a Cambodian royal funeral for Ang Em at Kampong Krasang, which was then under Vietnamese control. Ang Em left behind a 21-year-old son the Prince Ang Phim.

Even though Ang Duong, supported by Siam, had practically controlled most parts of Cambodia, the Cambodian royal regalia, including the Preah Khan Reach or Royal Sword, were in the possession of his niece and dynastic rival Ang Mey at Châu Phú. Upon learning that the Vietnamese had released the three top Cambodian ministers to Châu Đốc, Ang Duong at Oudong appointed his own cadre of ministers;

- Oknha Aekkareach Prom was appointed as Oknha Yomreach the Minister of Justice, becoming Oknha Yomreach Prom, also taking the acting position of Chauvea Tolaha or Cambodian Prime Minister for Ang Duong.
- Oknha Outey Thireach Hing the leader of Samraong Tong clique was appointed as Oknha Veang the Minister of the Palace, becoming Oknha Veang Hing.
- Oknha Vongsa Anchit Mey the leader of Bati clique was appointed as Oknha Chakrey the Minister of War, becoming Oknha Chakrey Mey.
- Ang Duong confirmed the self-proclaimed Oknha Kralahom Mouk of Preyveng to the position of Kralahom the Minister of Navy.

In 1843, Ang Duong assigned Oknha Veang Hing and Oknha Surkealok Muk the pro-Thai governor of Pursat to bring tributes from Ang Duong to the Siamese king Rama at Bangkok. This was the first of Ang Duong's tributes from Cambodia to Siam. Chauvea Tolaha Long, Ang Mey's Prime Minister, had Ang Mey and Neak Neang Ros write a letter to Ang Duong at Oudong, saying that, with the death of Ang Em, Neak Neang Ros was eager to unite with her remaining son Ang Duong and urged Ang Duong to denounce the Siamese and defect to Vietnamese side. Also in 1843, Phra Phitakbodin Som, whom Bodindecha had assigned to be the interim governor of Battambang in January 1840 since Ang Em's defection, died. Bodindecha then made Phra Narinyotha Nong the acting vice-governor to be the new governor of Battambang.

=== Vietnamese consolidation in Tây Ninh ===
In 1836, Trương Minh Giảng the Governor-General of Trấn Tây annexed Roung Damrei (Khmer: រោងដំរី), whhc had been inhabited by the Khmer people, into Vietnamese administration, forming the new Tây Ninh (西寧) province for Vietnam. Tây Ninh province was placed under jurisdiction of Gia Định (Saigon) province. When the Cambodian arose against Vietnamese rule in late 1840, Oknha Chakrey Nong the leader of the Ba Phnum clique sent Khmer armies to attack Tây Ninh. Oknha Luchakrey Pang the governor of Rumduol, which was near Tây Ninh, was initially loyal to Vietnam but later decided to join his fellow Oknha the Oknha Chakrey Nong. The Chams of Tbong Khmum also attacked Tây Ninh. Vietnamese Nguyen imperial court was yet to establish a firm control over the newly acquired Tây Ninh province. Emperor Thiệu Trị realized that Tây Ninh was a strategically important frontier against the Siam-dominated Cambodia. Thiệu Trị thought that Vietnam should consolidate its control over Tây Ninh in order to secure the frontier against Cambodia and to expand Vietnamese influence over Southeastern Cambodia, centered on Ba Phnum, to counter the Siamese. In February 1843, Thiệu Trị commanded Lê Văn Phú the Tổng đốc Định Biên governor of Saigon to send his subordinate Ngô Văn Giai along with 1,000 soldiers and criminal convicts from Gia Định (Saigon) to settle in Tây Ninh. Ngô Văn Giai was also to bring Cambodian ministers Chauvea Tolaha Long and Samdech Chauponhea Hu with him to pacify and persuade the local Khmer populace in Tây Ninh to submit to Vietnam.

Modern Tây Ninh province in Southern Vietnam

Ngô Văn Giai took three whole months to gather Southern Vietnamese men to go to Tây Ninh. In May 1843, Emperor Thiệu Trị sent a former Trấn Tây official named Cao Hữu Dực, along with additional 500 men from Gia Định, to accompany Ngô Văn Giai to Tây Ninh. Ngô Văn Giai, Cao Hữu Dực and 1,500 Southern Vietnamese men from Saigon arrived in Tây Ninh in May. Cao Hữu Dực soon reported to Thiệu Trị that the Tây Ninh province had been mostly in uncultivated wilderness with thick jungles. Cao Hữu Dực saw the place called Long Giang on the Vàm Cỏ Đông River in Quang Hóa district the only place viable for a settlement. Moreover, Tây Ninh lands also allowed the Vietnamese to travel from Saigon to Thông Bình and Bông Nguyên in the upper reaches of Định Tường province, the area that was called Kampeap Sreka Trey and Chis Rosey by the Khmers, which were the Vietnamese frontline citadels against Cambodian incursions from the Ba Phnum area. Cao Hữu Dực established Long Giang as Định Liêu (modern Bến Cầu) as the Vietnamese administrative center in Tây Ninh.

After the execution of Oknha Chakrey Nong by the order of Chaophraya Bodindecha and Ang Duong in mid-1842, the Cambodian Oknha nobles and the Khmer populace of Southeastern Cambodia remained hostile to the Siamese. Nguyễn Công Nhàn the viceroy of An Giang and Hà Tiên provinces reported to the Vietnamese Emperor that the Siamese under Bodindecha barely placed any troops in Eastern Cambodia to the east of Mekong, where the Siamese had minimal presence. There were only a few defensive fortifications along the way from Châu Đốc to Oudong. Bodindecha also entrusted Cambodian soldiers to guard these forts against Vietnam on behalf of the Siamese. Nguyễn Công Nhàn suggested that if Vietnam managed to incite an uprising of these Cambodians against Siam, Vietnam would be able to take this opportunity to reclaim control over Cambodia. Ngô Văn Giai at Tây Ninh sent off Chauvea Tolaha Long, Ang Mey's pro-Vietnamese Prime Minister, to conduct a public campaign in Ba Phnum to persuade the Southeastern Cambodians to arise against Siamese rule for Vietnam.

Under leadership of Ngô Văn Giai and Cao Hữu Dực, the Vietnamese settled in Tây Ninh to clear forests, plant crops and claim lands in order to fully integrate Tây Ninh province into Vietnam. Local Khmer population of Ruong Damrei or Tây Ninh peacefully submitted to the Vietnamese authorities. However, Chaophraya Bodindecha the Siamese generalissimo had sent some pro-Siamese Cambodian forces into Tây Ninh. These forces occasionally attacked and burnt down Vietnamese settlement and farmlands in Tây Ninh. Ngô Văn Giai and Cao Hữu Dực also faced a major problem. A large portion of the Vietnamese settlers in Tây Ninh were convicted criminals, who were unwilling to follow the government and escaped. Nine months after the conception of Định Liêu, Emperor Thiệu Trị officially established Định Liêu as the headquarter of Tây Ninh province in February 1844. Oknha Luchakrey Pang the Cambodian governor of Rumduol sent a congratulatory letter to Cao Hữu Dực at Tây Ninh and asked for a permission for the Cambodians to go to trade in Tây Ninh. Thiệu Trị, who had not yet trusted the Cambodians, refused this request. Thiệu Trị appointed Cao Hữu Dực to be the Tuyên phủ governor of Tây Ninh province.

=== Siamese economic policies in Cambodia ===
In the early to mid-nineteenth century, cardamom was the most valuable exporting commodity of Cambodia with high regional demand in the Chinese markets. Battambang, which had been under Siamese rule since 1795, began sending cardamom Suai tax-tributes to Bangkok in the 1830s. Battambang authorities conscripted Khmer and Chong people to pick cardamoms from the Cardamom Mountains. Appointed overseers of the cardamom-picking units were called Nai Kong Suai or Changwang Suai, which applied to both cardamom and gold tributes from Battambang to Bangkok, through Kabinburi. The Phrakhlang Sinkha or Siamese royal warehouse at Bangkok would sell these cardamoms gathered from Battambang to Chinese merchants at high prices, generating revenue for the Siamese court. In 1842, Battambang sent 100 Hap (Picul) of cardamoms (equal to about 6,000 kilokrams in weight) to Bangkok, requiring seven elephants, ninety buffaloes, thirty carts and more than a hundred of men to transport all the cardamoms from Battambang to Bangkok. Pursat, even though not under direct Siamese control, also sent cardamom and gold tributes to Bangkok. Oknha Surkealok Muk the Cambodian governor of Pursat was loyal to Siam. In 1842, Pursat sent sixty baht (about one kilogram) of gold and 1,532 baht (23 kilograms) of silver as Suai or tax to Bangkok. Next year, in 1843, Pursat sent 70 Hap (4,200 kilograms) of cardamoms to Bangkok. Ang Duong at Oudong also sent cardamom tributes to Bangkok in 1843 and 1844.

Cambodian economy also relied on the trade route that brought forest product from Southern Laos through Cambodia to Southern Vietnam, with Cambodian and Chinese merchants acting as middlemen who bought forest products from Southern Laos and sold them to Southern Vietnamese merchants. During the period of Vietnamese domination of Cambodia in 1813–1841, Cambodian, Chinese and Vietnamese merchants partook in this flourishing trade route. When Vietnam lost control over Cambodia in 1841 and was replaced by Siam, however, the Siamese under Chaophraya Bodindecha sought to dismantle this trade route from Laos going through Cambodia to Vietnam. Forest products from Southern Laos were beeswax, bastard cardamom, lac, lacquer, ivory and rhinoceros horns. Ivory and rhinoceros horns were particularly rare and valuable commodities. Bodindecha thought that if Chinese and Lao merchants were allowed to trade these Lao forest products in Cambodia and Vietnam, it would be beneficial to Vietnam and Siam would be deprived of due profits. In 1847, after the Siamese–Vietnamese wars had been over, Bodindecha imposed a trade embargo on Vietnam and Cambodia, forbidding any merchants to bring forest products from Xiengtaeng (Stung Treng), Khong and Saenpang (Siem Pang), which were under the Siam-controlled Champasak Kingdom, to sell them to any Vietnamese nor Cambodian merchants nor to sell them in Cambodia nor Vietnam. It appears that, even though this law was promulgated in 1847, Bodindecha had been implementing this trade embargo on Vietnam since the advent of Siamese occupation of Cambodia in 1841.

Chaophraya Bodindecha promoted an alternative route to transport forest goods from Southern Laos to Bangkok. Trade caravans from Southern Laos would cross the Mekong at Xiengtaeng to Thala Borivat, then make journey on land through Tonle Repou or Mluprey (in modern Preah Vihear province), then reach Siemreap and Battambang, then enter Siam through Kabinburi to reach Bangkok. Siam directly controlled all the lands along this trade route, which had long existed in duality with the route going to Vietnam. Bodindecha shifted the commercial activities from the trade route going to Vietnam to this route going to Bangkok, bypassing Phnom Penh and Southern Vietnam to prevent the Vietnamese from profiting from this trade. This policy of trade embargo between Southern Laos and Cambodia, enacted by Bodindecha, would remain in place until it was mostly repealed in the 1860s. However, the Siamese government continued to forbid the trade of ivory and rhinoceros horns, two most valuable trading articles, between Laos and Cambodia until 1883 when King Chulalongkorn finally abolished this trade embargo.

Siamese policy of shifting the trade route from Laos going to Southern Vietnam to going to Bangkok affected Cambodian economy. Cambodian merchants, Cambodian Oknha nobles and Khmer people, who had been benefitting from the Lao–Cambodian–Vietnamese trade route, which was sidelined in favor of the Lao–Siamese trade route, lost their revenue. Moreover, since the Vietnamese withdrawal from Cambodia in late 1841, the Vietnamese Emperor Thiệu Trị considered Cambodia an enemy of Vietnam and, therefore, had been forbidding all trades and commercial activities between Cambodia and Vietnam at the borders. The Siamese also imposed tariffs. Trading between the Siam-held Battambang and Phnom Penh would be subjected to a ten-percent tariff, while trading between Battambang and Bangkok was free because it was considered an 'internal' Siamese trade. Facing trade restrictions on all sides, unable to trade with Laos and Vietnam, Cambodian economy slumped and the Cambodians became desperate.

In May 1844, the Vietnamese moved the rump Cambodian court of Ang Mey at Châu Phú (to the south of Châu Đốc), including the Prince Ang Phim and other Cambodian royal ladies, to Đa Phước (to the north of Châu Đốc). Also in May, Thiệu Trị opened a trading house at Đa Phước to allow the Khmers, the Vietnamese, the Chinese and the Chams from Cambodia to come and trade. Vietnamese opening of trade at Đa Phước greatly delighted the Cambodians, who flocked in great numbers at Đa Phước to sell their commodities, cardamoms and rhinoceros horns. The Cambodian merchants complained to the Vietnamese that the Siamese under Chaophraya Bodindecha had imposed heavy taxes on Cambodia, generally upsetting the Cambodians. Emperor Thiệu Trị was rejoiced that the Cambodians began to turn away from the Siamese as this offered Vietnam an opportunity to reclaim control over Cambodia. Nguyễn Công Nhàn the viceroy of An Giang at Châu Đốc also pioneered the digging of a new canal connecting Châu Đốc on the Bassac River to Tân Châu on the Mekong to facilitate trade. In June 1844, Oknha Luchakrey Pang the Cambodian governor of Rumduol and Oknha Thommeadecho Meas the governor of Ba Phnum brought 4,800 Khmers and 2,300 buffaloes to trade at Tây Ninh. Thiệu Trị then consented to the opening of a new trading channel for the Cambodians at Tây Ninh.

=== Reshuffle in An Giang ===
In June 1844, Emperor Thiệu Trị dismissed top four officials of An Giang provinces for corruption and bribery charges including;

- Nguyễn Công Nhàn the Tổng đốc An Hà viceroy of An Giang and Hà Tiên provinces; Nguyễn Công Nhàn fought many wars with the Siamese from the battles of Stoung and Chikraeng in Cambodia in late 1840 to the battle of Vĩnh Tế canal in April 1842.
- Nguyễn Công Trứ the Tuần phủ sub-governor of An Giang; Nguyễn Công Trứ used to be the Deputy Governor-General of Trấn Tây in 1841 and was the one who came up with the idea of releasing Cambodian royalty Ang Mey and Ang Em to rally Khmer supports for Vietnam.
- Phùng Nghĩa Phương the Bố chính of An Giang; Phùng Nghĩa Phương used to be the Tuyên phủ governor of Sơn Tĩnh (Sambok) in Cambodia.
- Đoàn Quang Mật the Đề Đốc or military commander of An Giang; Đoàn Quang Mật fought the victorious battle of Vĩnh Tế canal over the Siamese in April 1842.

Nguyễn Công Nhàn, Nguyễn Công Trứ and Phùng Nghĩa Phương were the former Trấn Tây officials who moved to serve in Southern Vietnam after the collapse of the Trấn Tây province in late 1841. Thiệu Trị considered Nguyễn Công Nhàn to be a meritorious commander who had fought many battles with the Siamese so the Emperor did not sentence Nguyễn Công Nhàn to further punishments. Nguyễn Công Trứ was exiled to the Lao border at Quảng Ngãi province, while Phùng Nghĩa Phương was exiled to Côn Đảo Island. As Thiệu Trị purged the An Giang officialdom, he had to appointed new personnel to the An Giang province;

- Nguyễn Văn Chương (later changed his name to Nguyễn Trí Phương), the Tổng đốc Long Tường or the viceroy of Vĩnh Long and Định Tường provinces, was made the new Tổng đốc An Hà or viceroy of An Giang and Hà Tiên provinces, also technically in charge of Cambodian affairs, to replace Nguyễn Công Nhàn. Ngô Văn Giai from Tây Ninh was made the new Tổng đốc Long Tường to replace Nguyễn Văn Chương.
- Doãn Uẩn was made the new Tuần phủ sub-governor of An Giang to replace Nguyễn Công Trứ.
- Nguyễn Bá Nghi was made the new Bố chính of An Giang to replace Phùng Nghĩa Phương.

=== Shifting allegiances of Oknhas to Vietnam ===
The Khmer people and Oknha nobles of Southeastern Cambodia (Ba Phnum) had become dissatisfied with Siamese domination over Cambodia and had been actively seeking Vietnamese support. It was not until September 1844 that the Oknha ministers of the court of Ang Duong at Oudong began to contact the Vietnamese at Châu Đốc. These Oknhas wrote secret letters to Nguyễn Văn Chương the new Vietnamese viceroy at Châu Đốc, saying that they were suffering from Siamese rule and offered to incite the Khmer people to arise against the Siamese;

- Oknha Chakrey Mey (Trà Tri Mê), Ang Duong's Minister of War, who was formerly Oknha Vongsa Anchit Mey the leader of the Bati clique, who had earlier arose against Vietnamese rule in 1840, offered to rally the Khmers of Bati and S'ang to rebel against Ang Duong and the Siamese.
- Oknha Kralahom Mouk (Cao La Hâm Mộc) of Preyveng, Ang Duong's Minister of Navy, offered to rally the Khmers of Ba Phnum area in Southeastern Cambodia to arise against Ang Duong and the Siamese.
- Oknha Bavoreach Ros (Liêm Đột) volunteered to incite the Khmers of Tbong Khmum area, including at Lvea Aem (Lư An), Srey Santhor (Kỳ Tô), Kampong Siem (Bình Tiêm) and Chhloung (Mỹ Lâm) to arise against the Siamese.

Nguyễn Văn Chương at Châu Đốc, learned about this latest surprising fallout of the Cambodian nobles from the Siamese, informed Emperor Thiệu Trị at Huế. Thiệu Trị thought that this was the opportunity that could not be missed. Vietnamese offensives into Cambodia became more imminent. Thiệu Trị ordered the conscription of 20,000 Southern Vietnamese men from provinces to Châu Đốc to prepare for the upcoming Vietnamese invasion of Cambodia.

=== Siamese–Vietnamese negotiation of 1844 ===
The Siamese forces under Chaophraya Bodindecha, who had been stationing in Cambodia to 'protect' Cambodia from Vietnam for nearly four years since 1841, had been suffering from starvation and food shortages. However, Chaophraya Bodindecha could not yet withdraw his troops from Cambodia back to Siam due to the ever-looming Vietnamese threats. Bodindecha decided that peace negotiation was the only way to achieve security in Cambodia in order to allow himself and the Siamese to leave Cambodia. In November 1844, Oknha Kralahom Mouk, Ang Duong's Minister of Navy, sent a Khmer man to invite the Vietnamese commissioners at Châu Đốc for a negotiation with Cambodia–Siam. Skeptical, Nguyễn Văn Chương at Châu Đốc sent Nguyễn Bá Nghi out as the Vietnamese delegate. Chaophraya Bodindecha sent Phraya Narongwichai (Phi Nhã Đầu Long) as the Siamese delegate. They met just outside of Châu Đốc. Phraya Narongwichai stated that Ang Duong had been missing his mother (Neak Neang Ros, who had been staying with Ang Mey at Đa Phước) and laid out conditions that if the Vietnamese released Ang Duong's mother Neak Neang Ros, Ang Duong would submit himself to become a vassal of Vietnam, Siam and Vietnam would also resume friendly diplomatic relations. Nguyễn Bá Nghi replied that if Ang Duong was truly sincere in his intention to submit to Vietnam, Ang Duong should send a diplomatic letter to the Vietnamese Emperor Thiệu Trị at Huế first. All the presenting Cambodian nobles then put their hands together above their heads to salute.

Nguyễn Văn Chương petitioned to Thiệu Trị to persuade the Vietnamese Emperor to make peace with Cambodia–Siam, citing that the Southern Vietnamese people had been suffering from the instability coming from the Cambodian–Vietnamese conflicts and a peace settlement would bring security and prosperity. Cao Hữu Dực the governor of Tây Ninh also presented his own memorial to Thiệu Trị, beseeching the Emperor to pardon, accept and endorse Ang Duong as the King of Cambodia. Thiệu Trị brought these memorials to his advisors at Huế imperial court. The imperial advisors stated that coming to peace with Cambodia–Siam would certainly be beneficial but if Vietnam chose to initiate the diplomatic move first, Vietnam would be viewed as inferior and the Cambodians would hail Siam as their saviour. If Cambodia–Siam intended to make peace with Vietnam, Chaophraya Bodindecha (Siam) and Ang Duong (Cambodia) should send diplomatic letters or diplomatic envoys to the Vietnamese Emperor at Huế first. If Ang Duong wanted to see his mother, Ang Duong could immediately submit himself to Vietnam and go to see his mother. He did not have to wait.

Nguyễn Văn Chương told Phraya Narongwichai the Siamese delegate that if Siam wanted to conclude a peace settlement with Vietnam, Siam should send a diplomatic letter to the Vietnamese Emperor Thiệu Trị at Huế first. Narongwichai refused, insisting that it was Vietnam who should send a diplomatic letter to Bangkok first. As both sides refused to be the first to initiate the intended diplomatic gesture, this Siamese–Vietnamese negotiation in November 1844 failed. Nguyễn Văn Chương then told Emperor Thiệu Trị;

The Siamese have been there (Cambodia) for many years, chasing Khmer people like dogs and goats to make the Khmers their servants, sucking blood of the Khmer people to get obese. The Siamese are determined not to cut [Cambodia] off and leave [from Cambodia] so they set up this long-dragging negotiation, wishing for peace. If we delay for months and years, the Siamese will be able to fully prepare for defenses [in Cambodia]. We must show our military might to make the Siamese fear us forever. So, please wait until the flooding season in late summer to early autumn, when the flood-water gradually rises, then we will immediately send a large army to attack and take Cambodia.

In December 1844, Chaophraya Bodindecha at Oudong was informed that the Vietnamese at Châu Đốc allocated 1,500 men from Châu Đốc to Hà Tiên. Bodindecha strongly speculated Vietnamese offensive on Kampot from Hà Tiên but the Vietnamese did not come. As the Vietnamese invasion did not take place, giving the deteriorating conditions of the Siamese in Cambodia, Chaophraya Bodindecha decided to eventually leave and withdraw Lao–Siamese forces from Cambodia in February 1845, leaving Phraya Narongwichai, Phra Phromborirak and Phra Narinyotha Nong in Oudong as Siamese commissioners in charge of Cambodia. Bodindecha and the Siamese, who had been in Cambodia since January 1840, after four years of occupying Cambodia, eventually withdrew and returned to Siam. Bodindecha's previous departure from Battambang to Bangkok in 1838 resulted in the defection of Ang Em to Vietnamese side in 1839. Also this time, Bodindecha's departure from Cambodia in early 1845 would lead to a Cambodian movement against Siamese domination and a new round of the Siamese–Vietnamese War.

In April 1845, Oknha Luchakrey Pang the Cambodian governor of Rumduol, who was pro-Vietnamese, in his attempt to force a peace settlement between Siam and Vietnam to facilitate Cambodian trade at the borders, came up with a plot. Luchakrey Pang told Cao Hữu Dực the governor of Tây Ninh that he had been planning to insurrect against Ang Duong and asked for Vietnamese reinforcements. Cao Hữu Dực sent the Khmer–Vietnamese translator Nguyễn Bá Hựu to talk to Luchakrey Pang. When Nguyễn Bá Hựu was talking with Oknha Luchakrey Pang, however, Luchakrey Pang blew a whistle and Khmer guerilla men ambushed the Vietnamese. Nguyễn Bá Hựu was arrested, abducted by Luchakrey Pang and sent to the Siamese at Phnom Penh. Upon learning about this abduction incident, the Vietnamese Emperor Thiệu Trị became incensed and ordered the closure of all trades with Cambodia through Tây Ninh. Oknha Luchakrey Pang told Cao Hữu Dực that, if the Vietnamese wanted Nguyễn Bá Hựu back, they should write a diplomatic letter to establish a friendly relation with the Siamese in Cambodia. Cao Hữu Dực complied as he wrote a friendly letter to the Siamese and forwarded the letter to Nguyễn Văn Chương the viceroy of An Giang in order for the letter to be forwarded further to Phraya Narongwichai the Siamese commissioner. Nguyễn Văn Chương, however, refused to send Cao Hữu Dực's letter to the Siamese, saying that this Nguyễn Bá Hựu abduction plot was instigated by the Cambodians in order to force Vietnam to make peace with Siam. Phraya Narongwichai then sent Nguyễn Bá Hựu as captive to be resettled in Bangkok.

== Vietnamese offensives of 1845 ==
=== Cambodia under Siamese domination ===
When the Vietnamese lost control over Cambodia and retreated to Southern Vietnam in November 1841, the Siamese under their supreme commander Chaophraya Bodindecha established Siamese domination over Cambodia, while also promoting Ang Duong as the ruler of Cambodia. However, due to the ongoing warfare, agricultural production in Cambodia plummeted, resulting in severe famine and rice shortage conditions. The Siamese retained their presence in Cambodia with difficulties as the Khmers, the Laotians and the Siamese forces under Bodindecha all had been suffering from starvation. Later, the Siamese king Rama III or King Nangklao commanded Chaophraya Bodindecha to conduct offensives on the Vĩnh Tế canal at An Giang in 1842. The Siamese king also sent his younger half-brother Prince Kromma Khun Itsaret Rangsan along with Chameun Waiworanat Chuang Bunnag to bring Siamese naval forces to attack Hà Tiên. Chaophraya Bodindecha also sent Chaophraya Yommarat Bunnag to attack Vĩnh Tế canal at An Giang. The Vietnamese prevailed against the Siamese invaders at both An Giang and Hà Tiên fronts. These Siamese defeats in early 1842 put them in a setback position and Vietnamese retaliatory attacks became looming. However, the Vietnamese, especially the Southern Vietnamese, were too exhausted to conduct any offensives on the Siam-dominated Cambodia as they needed recuperation, leading to a Siamese–Vietnamese stalemate that lasted for three years from 1842 to 1845.

As the Vietnamese had not yet come, Chaophraya Bodindecha built a new fortress at Oudong for Ang Duong. Bodindecha also constripted Khmer, Lao and Siamese men to build new forts along the Mekong on the route to Southern Vietnam and to garrison in those new forts in preparation for speculative Vietnamese invasions. During their rule, the Siamese did not manage to address the famine situation in Cambodia. Presence of several ten-thousands of Lao–Siamese forces in Cambodia consumed a large quantity of rice. The Khmers began to perceive that they were being oppressed by the Siamese. This situation was similar to the Trấn Tây province period (1835–1841) when the Vietnamese conscripted Khmer people for labor and defense to 'protect' Cambodia against Siam. Similarly, this time, the Siamese conscripted the Khmers for labor and defense to 'protect' Cambodia from Vietnam. Chaophraya Bodindecha faced the same problems in Cambodia that Trương Minh Giảng had faced before him. Bodindecha found the Cambodian Oknhas noble and Khmer people to be unworkable as they could not be effectively utilized nor mobilized to do anything. Moreover, the Siamese trade policy of shifting the trade route from Southern Laos and Xiengtaeng (Stung Treng) to Battambang and Bangkok instead of going to Phnom Penh and Southern Vietnam affected the Cambodians and the Oknhas around the Phnom Penh area who had been benefitting from this trade route.

Cambodian nobility of the royal court of Ang Duong at Oudong began to resent Siamese rule. By mid-1844, Ang Duong's ministers including Oknha Chakrey Mey (Trà Tri Mê) the Minister of War and Oknha Kralahom Mouk (Cao La Hâm Mộc) the Minister of Navy had contacted Nguyễn Văn Chương (Nguyễn Tri Phương) the Vietnamese viceroy of An Giang at Châu Đốc, offering to rally the Khmer populace to arise against the Siamese. The Vietnamese had been speculating for a Cambodian–Siamese conflict so that they would march armies to seize control of and reclaim Cambodia, like when the Siamese took advantage of the Cambodian uprising against Vietnam to take control of Cambodia in 1840. After stationing in Cambodia for four years, Chaophraya Bodindecha the supreme Siamese commander in Cambodia withdrew his bulk forces and left Cambodia in February 1845 to return to Bangkok. Upon his leave, Bodindecha assigned Phraya Narongwichai, Phra Phromborirak (Bodindecha's son) and Phra Narinyotha Nong (Governor of Battambang) in Oudong as Siamese commissioners in charge of Cambodia. On this same occasion, Ang Duong sent his officials Oknha Yomreach Prom the Minister of Justice, who was also acting as Chauvea Tolaha or Prime Minister to Ang Duong and Oknha Dechou Snang Ey the pro-Thai governor of Kampong Svay to follow Bodindecha to Bangkok to present cardamom tributes to the Siamese king Nangklao.

In April 1845, in an attempt to force Vietnam to make peace with Siam, Oknha Luchakrey Pang abducted a Vietnamese official Nguyễn Bá Hựu from Tây Ninh to Phnom Penh, where Luchakrey Pang held Nguyễn Bá Hựu ransom, demanding the Vietnamese to send a diplomatic letter to the Siamese at Phnom Penh to make peace in exchange for the release of Nguyễn Bá Hựu. Nguyễn Văn Chương insisted that the Vietnamese should not comply to this manipulative scheme. As the Vietnamese did not negotiate, the Siamese sent Nguyễn Bá Hựu as captive to Bangkok. Shortly after, two local Cambodian nobles named Man and Saur brought Khmer people from Svayyap to flee Siamese rule to Thông Bình in the upper reaches of the Vietnamese Định Tường province to seek Vietnamese protection. The Vietnamese welcomed them but Emperor Thiệu Trị and Nguyễn Văn Chương still did not fully trust the Cambodians, given the Nguyễn Bá Hựu abduction incident.

=== Anti-Siamese Cambodian uprising attempt ===
In May 1845, Ang Duong and the Siamese commissioners in Cambodia, including Phraya Narongwichai, Phra Phromborirak and Phra Narinyotha, caught a number of secret letters of some of Ang Duong's Oknhas corresponding with the Vietnamese planning for an insurrection against Ang Duong and the Siamese in Cambodia. Twelve Oknhas were implicated and the leading figures among these nobles was Oknha Chakrey Mey, Ang Duong's Minister of War, who was formerly known as Oknha Vongsa Anchit Mey the leader of Bati clique who had earlier arisen against Vietnamese rule in 1840 with Siamese support. Chakrey Mey planned an uprising in Ba Phnum so that the Vietnamese would march into Cambodia to get rid of Ang Duong and the Siamese from Cambodia and to bring the pro-Vietnamese candidate Princess Ang Mey to the Cambodian throne. Ang Duong at Phnom Penh summoned Oknha Chakrey Mey for an audience on a riparian pontoon. Chakrey Mey, unaware that his seditious plan had been leaked, went to see Ang Duong and was arrested.

Other eleven conspirators of this anti-Siamese rebellion plot included Oknha Bavoreach Ros, Oknha Preakhleang Souk, Oknha Monudechea Srey, Oknha Sreysokon Tieng, Oknha Sutuphaveang Kau, Oknha Montrey Chetdorong Puch, Oknha Ruonrongsena Ok, Oknha Reaksaphumin Saom, Oknha Senaphipheak Saom, Oknha Sreynokor Thomoreach Muk and Oknha Vongsathyphdey Srey. Strangely, Oknha Kralahom Mouk was not implicated in this abortive plot. It was possible that Kralahom Mouk's letter to the Vietnamese were never caught or that it was a Siamese decoy as Bodindecha might command Kralahom Mouk to act pretending to seek Vietnamese help.

Upon the arrest of Oknha Chakrey Mey by Ang Duong at Phnom Penh, other conspirators fled. The Oknhas Preakhleang Souk, Sreysokon Tieng and Sutuphaveang Kau brought their families to flee to seek refuge under the Vietnamese at Châu Đốc. Other implicated Oknhas were not in Phnom Penh;

- Oknha Monudechea Srey was in Srey Santhor, pacifying the local criminal bandits.
- The Oknhas Montrey Chetdorong Puch, Ruonrongsena Ok, Reaksaphumin Saom and Vongsathyphdey Srey had been in Tbong Khmum in Eastern Cambodia logging local trees for construction of a new palace for Ang Duong.

With the arrest of Oknha Chakrey Mey, Oknha Bavorreach Ros became the leader of this rebellion. Bavoreach Ros fled to join his biological brother Oknha Monudechea Srey at Srey Santhor (about 35 kilometers to the northeast of Phnom Penh) and joined with the four other Oknhas to form a clique centered on Srey Santhor, gather the Khmer men from Srey Santhor and Tbong Khmum to insurrect against Siamese domination of Cambodia and to rebel against Ang Duong. Ang Duong and the Siamese commissioner Phraya Narongwichai sent Samdech Chauponhea Ros to lead armies and Oknha Vongsa Akkhareach Preap to lead riparian fleet to attack the rebels at Srey Santhor. Ang Duong's armies prevailed over the rebels at Srey Santhor and captured the rebel leaders, except for Oknha Bavoreach Ros the rebel leader himself who fled to the Vietnamese Tây Ninh province. Other rebelling Oknhas were brought to Ang Duong in Phnom Penh.

In traditional Southeast Asian law, the sacred, deified punitive power to impose death sentences on subjects belonged solely to a monarch. Ang Duong, who had not yet been officially and ceremonially enthroned, felt that he had to ask for a permission of the Siamese king Rama to sentence his rebellious Oknhas to death. Ang Duong sent a delegate to Bangkok, asking for Siamese royal punishments of these Oknhas for sedition. When the Siamese king consented to the punishments, Ang Duong sentenced the six captured Oknhas, the Oknhas Chakrey Mey, Monudechea Srey, Montrey Chetdorong Puch, Ruonrongsena Ok, Reaksaphumin Saom and Vongsathyphdey Srey to death and had them executed.

=== Vietnamese preparation ===
Oknha Bavoreach Ros (Liêm Đột), who fled to the Vietnamese Tây Ninh province, asked Cao Hữu Dực the governor of Tây Ninh for reinforcements against Ang Duong and the Siamese. Cao Hữu Dực sent Bavoreach Ros along with Tây Ninh forces to Nguyễn Văn Chương at Châu Đốc. Nguyễn Văn Chương saw that the Vietnamese should conduct offensives into Cambodia as soon as possible because the anticipated Cambodian uprising against Siam under Oknha Chakrey Mey (Trà Tri Mê) had been aborted, cut at the nip and Chakrey Mey had been executed. If the Vietnamese did not take any time actions, they would lose this golden opportunity for the long-awaited reconquest of Cambodia. In June 1845, Nguyễn Văn Chương requested Thiệu Trị for a supreme commander of the compaign to invade Cambodia. Thiệu Trị then appointed Võ Văn Giải from Huế to be Tổng đốc Định Biên or governor of Gia Định and Biên Hòa provinces, technically the Governor of Saigon, to replace Lê Văn Phú, who stepped down to be Đề Đốc or military commander of Saigon. Tôn Thất Bạch was appointed to be the Tuần phủ sub-governor of Gia Định (Saigon).

By mid-1845, Vietnamese administrators of Southern Vietnam were;

- Võ Văn Giải was the Tổng đốc Định Biên governor of Gia Định and Biên Hòa provinces, technically governor of Saigon.
  - Tôn Thất Bạch was the Tuần phủ sub-governor of Gia Định (Saigon).
  - Lê Văn Phú was the Đề Đốc military commander of Saigon.
- Nguyễn Văn Chương (Nguyễn Tri Phương) was the Tổng đốc An Hà governor of An Giang (Châu Đốc) and Hà Tiên provinces.
  - Doãn Uẩn was the Tuần phủ sub-governor of An Giang.
  - Nguyễn Văn Hoàng was the Đề Đốc military commander of An Giang.
- Ngô Văn Giai was the Tổng đốc Long Tường governor of Vĩnh Long and Định Tường provinces.
- Cao Hữu Dực was the Tuyên phủ governor of Tây Ninh province.
  - Nguyễn Công Nhàn was previously the Tổng đốc An Hà of Châu Đốc but was dismissed from his position in 1844. Nguyễn Công Nhàn was appointed the position of Lãnh binh commander of Tây Ninh, a lower-ranking position.

In late June 1845, Nguyễn Văn Chương proposed the invasion plan to Emperor Thiệu Trị, in which Nguyễn Văn Chương would lead Vietnamese riparian fleet from An Giang along the Mekong to attack Ba Phnum in Southeastern Cambodia, while Doãn Uẩn would lead another fleet from Thông Bình to converge with Nguyễn Văn Chương at Ba Phnum, leaving Nguyễn Văn Hoàng to guard the city of Châu Đốc itself. Thiệu Trị replied that Nguyễn Văn Chương should stay to guard Châu Đốc, while sending Nguyễn Văn Hoàng as vanguard to attack. The eventual Vietnamese plan for this Cambodian campaign was;

- Nguyễn Văn Hoàng would lead Vietnamese riparian fleet from Tân Châu, An Giang, proceeding along the Mekong to attack Ba Phnum.
- Doãn Uẩn would lead another fleet from Thông Bình, proceeding along the Kampong Trabaek River to converge with Nguyễn Văn Hoàng at Ba Phnum.
- Nguyễn Công Nhàn would also lead forces from Tây Ninh to join this invasion to reinforce the first two armies.

Emperor Thiệu Trị also declared that any Cambodians who laid down their arms and submitted to Vietnam would be spared and rewarded and those who were on the Siamese side and fought against Vietnam would be killed.

Vietnamese offensives on Cambodia (1845)
- Part of Siamese–Vietnamese wars
Date	4 July 1845 – 3 December 1845
Location	Cambodia: Oudong and vicinity (Kampong Luong and Ponhea Lueu), Phnom Penh; Southeastern Cambodia: Ba Phnum, Kampong Trabaek, Banteay Daek, Peam Ro, Peam Chor
Result	Siamese–Vietnamese peace settlement over Cambodia

Belligerents
Rattanakosin Kingdom (Siam); Cambodia	Nguyễn dynasty (Vietnam)

Commanders and leaders
Chaophraya Bodindecha; Phraya Chaiwichit Kham; Phraya Narongwichai; Phra Phromborirak Kaew; Phra Narinyotha Nong; Ang Duong; Oknha Kralahom Mouk; Oknha Thommeadecho Meas; Oknha Luchakrey Pang	Võ Văn Giải; Lê Văn Phú; Nguyễn Văn Chương; Tôn Thất Bạch; Doãn Uẩn; Nguyễn Văn Hoàng; Nguyễn Công Nhàn; Tôn Thất Nghị; Hồ Đức Tú

Units involved
Khmer–Lao–Siamese levies from Central Siam, Nakhon Ratchasima, Cambodia and Northern Khmer	Imperial Vietnamese Army; Nam Kỳ (Cochinchinese) regiments

Strength
40,000 men	12,000 men with 1,000 riparian vessels

Casualties and losses
unknown	unknown

=== Vietnamese offensives on Southeastern Cambodia ===
On 4 July 1845, Nguyễn Văn Hoàng from Tân Châu and Doãn Uẩn from Thông Bình began offensives into Southeastern Cambodia simultaneously on the same day;

- Nguyễn Văn Hoàng, who brought Oknha Bavoreach Ros with him, assigned Hồ Đức Tú to be his vanguard commander and Lê Đình Lý as his rearguard. Nguyễn Văn Hoàng's forces, with 3,000 men in 80 riparian vessels, sailed along the Mekong and attacked the Cambodians at Chruey Dombang (Tầm Bôn) near Peam Chor. The Cambodians were unable to withstand the overwhelming Vietnamese so they retreated as the Vietnamese prevailed. Nguyễn Văn Hoàng took position at Chruey Dombang.
- Doãn Uẩn and Nguyễn Sáng sailed with 120 riparian vessels and 2,000 men along the Kampong Trabaek River towards Kampong Trabaek (Gò Bắc).

Doãn Uẩn and Nguyễn Sáng attacked Kampong Trabaek on 11 July 1845. The Cambodians were again unable to defend Kampong Trabeak and retreated, leaving the place to the Vietnamese.

In response to this Vietnamese invasion, Phraya Narongwichai the Siamese commissioner in Cambodia sent Ang Duong and Phra Phromborirak (Bodindecha's son) to guard at Banteay Daek Fort and sent Phra Narinyotha Nong (Governor of Battambang) to join with Oknha Kralahom Mouk to guard the Peam Meanchey Fort in Peam Ro. Ang Duong also sent a delegate to Bangkok to inform the Siamese king Nangklao that the Vietnamese were attacking Cambodia.

Doãn Uẩn and Nguyễn Sáng took position at Kampong Trabaek. Oknha Luchakrey Pang the Cambodian governor of Rumduol and Oknha Thommeadecho Meas the governor of Ba Phnum, who had been initially seemed to be pro-Vietnamese, eventually fought for Ang Duong against Vietnam. Luchakrey Pang and Thommeadecho Meas took position at Khsach Sa (Sách Sô), about seven kilometers to the northwest of Ba Phnum on the Boeng Khsach Sa Lake. Next target for the Vietnamese were Khsach Sa and Peam Meanchey forts. Nguyễn Văn Hoàng from Chruey Dombang and Doãn Uẩn from Kampong Trabaek inflicted a two-pronged attack on the Cambodians at Khsach Sa, defeating and dispersing the Khmers under Luchakrey Pang and Thommeadecho Meas from Khsach Sa.

Under leadership of Doãn Uẩn and Nguyễn Văn Hoàng, the Vietnamese took control of the whole Ba Phnum region of Southeastern Cambodia in July 1845. The Peam Meanchey Fort under Phra Narinyotha Nong and Oknha Kralahom Mouk was the last Siamese fort standing on the left (eastern) bank of Mekong. Doãn Uẩn proceeded to build the Banlich Prasat (Bang Chích) Fort, which was just about seven kilometers to the south of Peam Meanchey. The Vietnamese took positions at Kampong Trabaek, Khsach Sa and Banlich Prasat but it turned out that the local Khmer people came to submit to Vietnam in smaller number than the Vietnamese had been expecting. Ang Duong sent 5,000 Cambodian–Siamese men to attack Doãn Uẩn at Khsach Sa, which was repelled.

Upon learning about this latest Vietnamese invasion of Cambodia, the Siamese king Nangklao was relieved that the seditious Oknhas of Ang Duong's court had already been purged beforehand, or else the situation would be much worse for the Siamese. King Nangklao thought that the small number of Siamese troops in Cambodia protecting Ang Duong would not be sufficient to resist Vietnamese attacks so he commanded Chaophraya Bodindecha to return to Cambodia, while also conscripting Siamese men to join Bodindecha in Cambodia in succession. Chaophraya Bodindecha, aged 69 by then, left Bangkok with his armies on 25 July 1845, going through Prachinburi, Kabinburi and Battambang to reach Cambodia. When Bodindecha reached Aranyaprathet, however, his personal musket attached to the side of his body accidentally exploded. Bodindecha sustained burning injuries on his shoulder and arm and had to be treated all the way on his journey to Cambodia.

=== Vietnamese conquest of Phnom Penh ===
In July 1845, Doãn Uẩn and Nguyễn Văn Hoàng led the Vietnamese forces to attack and conquer the Ba Phnum area, taking control of the whole left (eastern) bank of Mekong in Southeastern Cambodia. Peam Meanchey Fort under Phra Narinyotha Nong and Oknha Kralahom Mouk was the only remaining Siamese fort standing on the eastern bank of Mekong. On the right (western) bank of Mekong, Ang Duong and Phra Phromborirak were guarding at Banteay Daek (Thiết Thằng). Siamese king Rama III granted 40,000 Lao–Siamese men to defend Cambodia from this Vietnamese invasion but all these forces had to be gradually conscripted and transferred to Cambodia. Chaophraya Bodindecha the Siamese supreme commander arrived in Cambodia with Oknha Yomreach Prom (Ang Duong's Prime Minister) and Oknha Dechou Snang Ey (governor of Kampong Svay), who had earlier gone to Bangkok to present Ang Duong's tributes to the Siamese king. In the wet season of 1845, the water level through Cambodia was abnormally high. The water inundated the city of Oudong, including Ang Duong's palace. Ang Duong then set up a place for Bodindecha to live at Russey Keo, which was a high ground not subjected to flooding.

Võ Văn Giải the governor of Saigon and Tôn Thất Bạch the vice-governor of Saigon sailed Vietnamese forces from Saigon to join with Nguyễn Văn Chương at Châu Đốc. In August 1845, Võ Văn Giải and Nguyễn Văn Chương brought Southern Vietnamese forces, along with the 24-year-old Cambodian prince Ang Phim (Nặc Ong Bướm), son of the deceased pro-Vietnamese Cambodian prince Ang Em, to rally and persuade the Khmer people of Ba Phnum to submit to Vietnam. However, only a small number of Cambodians actually came to submit. Nguyễn Văn Chương speculated that it was because the Siamese had blocked the Cambodians, preventing them from submitting to the Vietnamese. A large number of Khmer people in Ba Phnum area took refuge at Peam Meanchey citadel. Nguyễn Văn Chương suggested that the Vietnamese should press on attacking in order to incite more Cambodians to submit. Võ Văn Giải, however, countered that they should take a rather cautionary approach, not rushing. Emperor Thiệu Trị ruled in favor of Nguyễn Văn Chương, saying that the Vietnamese should keep on advancing into Cambodia. Meanwhile, Ang Duong commanded the governor of Kampot to send forces to attack Hà Tiên in an attempt to distract the Vietnamese on another war front.

After occupying Southeastern Cambodia for about two months, the Vietnamese renewed offensives. In early September 1845, Nguyễn Văn Chương and Doãn Uẩn from Ba Phnum attacked the Peam Meanchey Fort. The Cambodians–Siamese under Phra Narinyotha Nong and Oknha Kralahom Mouk, not withstading such intensive Vietnamese attack, were defeated and retreated. The Vietnamese prevailed over the Cambodians–Siamese at Peam Meanchey. The Vietnamese victory and advance were so swift that Phra Narinyotha Nong did not have time to tell Ang Duong that his Peam Meachey Fort had been taken. When the Vietnamese attacked Ang Duong at Banteay Daek (Thiết Thằng), Ang Duong was caught surprised. Nguyễn Văn Chương and Tôn Thất Nghị, with 3,000 Vietnamese men and Doãn Uẩn and Nguyễn Văn Hoàng, with 2,000 men, attacked Banteay Daek on two sides. Ang Duong and Phra Phromborirak led the Cambodian–Siamese forces to resist Vietnamese attack but to no avail. After about three days of fighting, Ang Duong and Phromborirak retreated to Phnom Penh. The Vietnamese prevailed again at Banteay Daek. Mekong fortifications, established by Bodindecha in 1843, had failed to halt Vietnamese incursion so far.

Bodindecha considered Phnom Penh dangerous and susceptible to Vietnamese attacks so Bodindecha put Ang Duong in Oudong and sent Siamese commanders Phraya Chaiwichit Kham the governor of Ayutthaya (formerly known as Phra Phirenthorathep), Phraya Narongwichai and Bodindecha's son Phra Phromborirak to guard at Phnom Penh against upcoming Vietnamese invasion. After taking Peam Meanchey and Banteay Daek, the Vietnamese went on a blitzkrieg to conquer Phnom Penh. Siamese commanders Phraya Chaiwichit, Phraya Narongwichai and Phra Phromborirak were with 5,000 Khmer–Lao–Siamese men guarding Phnom Penh but the flood water level was so high that there were barely any places for them to take a stand. Taking advantage of the high flooding water level, the Vietnamese riparian fleet, with around 5,000 men, attacked Phnom Penh on 11 September 1845 and quickly took the city. The Siamese suffered heavy casualties and were routed. A number of Siamese officers were killed as the Siamese disorderly retreated towards Oudong. Those who could not find a boat had to swim in the flooding water to flee the Vietnamese to Oudong. 600 Siamese and 1,400 Cambodians were killed in this battle.

After the Vietnamese withdrawal from Trấn Tây Cambodia in November 1841, after four years, the Vietnamese were able to take control of Phnom Penh again in September 1845. Upon learning of the Vietnamese reconquest of Phnom Penh, the Vietnamese Emperor Thiệu Trị was more than rejoiced. Thiệu Trị stated that, since the Vietnamese withdrawal of 1841, he had never dreamt of reconquest of Cambodia, only concerning about the well-being of his Southern Vietnamese subjects. However, Thiệu Trị also reminded the Vietnamese commanders in Cambodia that conquest of Cambodia might be an easy task but retaining Cambodia could be a hard mission. Thiệu Trị commanded Nguyễn Văn Chương and Doãn Uẩn to pursue the Siamese to Oudong as soon as possible. Thiệu Trị also declared that any Cambodians who came to submit to Vietnam would be spared from all punishments. Võ Văn Giải proposed to the Emperor to endorse the Cambodian prince Ang Phim (Nặc Ong Bướm) as the King of Cambodia. Thiệu Trị rejected this proposal, however, saying that Ang Phim was too young to be a ruler and they should focus on deploying senior influential pro-Vietnamese Cambodian mandarins, such as Chauvea Tolaha Long and Samdech Chauponhea Hu to do the work of persuading Khmer people to submit.

=== First Vietnamese attack on Oudong ===
In the newly conquered Phnom Penh, 23,000 Khmer people of Phnom Penh came to submit to the Vietnamese, saying that they had been oppressed by the Siamese. Võ Văn Giải the governor of Saigon, Tôn Thất Bạch the vice-governor of Saigon and Nguyễn Văn Hoàng stayed in Phnom Penh to gather the support of the Cambodian populace, while other Vietnamese commanders went to pursue the Siamese to Oudong. Thiệu Trị thought that the Vietnamese forces in Cambodia were still not adequate to conquer Cambodia so he rallied more forces from Huế and from Central Vietnamese provinces including Quảng Nam, Quảng Ngãi, Bình Định, Bình Thuận, Phú Yên and Khánh Hòa provinces into Cambodia. Thiệu Trị said that; "The [Vietnamese imperial] court raises army to eliminate the cruel, to help the innocents, to save people and to punish the guilty. Now the Khmer people have voluntarily accepted the punishment of being beaten in order to show their repentance and to say that the Siamese have been encroaching on them, creating enemies for themselves. Therefore, [Siamese] ringleaders must be killed but the oppressed should not be punished. As for the [Khmer] local chiefs and natives who surrendered, they must be pardoned and allowed to live. They must be arranged to live in peaceful life." Thiệu Trị then turned to his younger brother Prince Nguyễn Phúc Miên Định saying "The Khmer people, who had previously raised weapons against our court, now come to surrender. There are thousands and thousands [of Khmer people] and they are truly and unusually fickle. It is not easy to make them submit. Last year, [Vietnamese] army left Trấn Tây and the Siamese kept Cambodia as their own. I thought that the Siamese had a storehouse to defend but now they left only an empty citadel! The Siamese are nothing but rabbles, plotting everyday but the Siamese have run out of their tricks and will soon retreat at night."

Thiệu Trị also put bounty on Siamese commanders. Those who managed to kill and cut off heads of Siamese commanders could claim rewards from the Vietnamese imperial court. The bounty for Chaophraya Bodindecha the Siamese supreme commander was 1,000 quan or strings of Vietnamese sapèque coins (Each string had ten coins, equivalent to ₫600.) plus 100 lạng (around four kilograms) of silver. The bounty for Ang Duong was 500 quan or strings of coins plus 100 lạng (around four kilograms) of silver. The bounties for Phraya Narongwichai (Phi Nhã Đầu Long) and Phra Narinyotha Nong (Sá Na Lăng) were 300 quan or string of coins each.

Nguyễn Văn Chương and Doãn Uẩn sailed Vietnamese riparian fleet from Phnom Penh to attack the Siamese-held Oudong, the residence and base of Ang Duong. Nguyễn Văn Chương assigned Hồ Đức Tú to be vanguard, Doãn Uẩn to be rearguard, Nguyễn Công Nhàn as left wing and Nguyễn Văn Chương himself as right wing. Nguyễn Văn Chương and the Vietnamese sailed upstream along the Tonle Sap River, reaching Oudong on 26 September 1845;

- Hồ Đức Tú, with 1,000 men, stationed at Kampong Luong on the riverbank to the northeast of Oudong.
- Doãn Uẩn, Tôn Thất Nghị and Nguyễn Công Nhàn, with 2,000 men, took position at Ponhea Lueu to the southeast of Oudong on the riverbank.

The Vietnamese blocked all the way upstream up to Kampong Chhnang to prevent the Siamese from retreating to Battambang. Unlike Phnom Penh, Oudong was in a relative high ground, not on the riverbank and was a defensible position for the Siamese. As the Vietnamese advanced towards Oudong, the Siamese fired their muskets with great intensity. Nguyễn Văn Chương ordered the Vietnamese to disembark from their boats and proceed on land. The Vietnamese took position on the eastern vicinity of Oudong at Kampong Chauvea and Vat Vihear Samnor temple. The Vietnamese built forts at Vat Sbaeng temple, the Pupey Hill and Vat Cheydey Thmey temple to the east of Oudong. Chaophraya Bodindecha ordered trenches to be dug around Oudong. Khmer, Lao and Siamese men were levied to defend against the Vietnamese attack, taking positions at Kampong Krassang and Vat Veang Chas temple. Khmer inhabitants of Oudong were moved to take refuge at Battambang and Trapeang Kong.

Nguyễn Văn Chương led about 20,000 Vietnamese troops and 1,000 warships, according to Thai estimates, divided into many smaller forces, expecting to attack and besiege Oudong from all directions, which was defended by Bodindecha and Duong. As the Vietnamese approached the Baren Hill, Chaophraya Bodindecha sent his son-in-law Chameun Sanphetphakdi to unleash a great herd of elephant shock troops with 300 war elephants against the Vietnamese. A great number of Vietnamese were crushed and trampled under the elephants' feet. During this elephant-trampling ordeal, Hồ Đức Tú the Vietnamese vanguard commander was knocked off by an elephant and surrounded by the Siamese. A pro-Vietnamese Cambodian officer named Keav (Giao) had to rescue Hồ Đức Tú and took him to safety. Nguyễn Công Nhàn managed to shoot fires to scare off some elephants. According to Thai record, the Vietnamese supreme commander named Ong Ta Tien Kun (presumably Võ Văn Giải) suddenly fell very ill and ordered the Vietnamese army to retreat and cancel the campaign. Other Vietnamese units began panicking and being demoralized. The Vietnamese, who "have no elephants with them because they come by boat", were demoralized by this swarm of angry elephants. Eventually, according to Thai chronicles, the Vietnamese had to retreat to the riverbanks. Thai historiography regarded this battle of Baren Hill as the first Siamese victory and Vietnamese defeat during this Vietnamese offensive of 1845. Thiphakornwong's Chronicles of the Third Reign stated that;

[Bodindecha] arranged for the available elephants and the troops. If the Vietnamese came, he would send out elephants to trample them. When the Vietnamese arrived at the vicinity [of Oudong], Chaophraya Bodindecha drove out elephant troops to trample on [the Vietnamese]. The Vietnamese did not even have time to dig trenches. When the elephant troops reached the Vietnamese, they shot and pierce the Vietnamese in a great debacle. [Siamese] troops also joined in, shooting and slashing in scuffle. The Vietnamese armies were then defeated and retreated to the boats, a great number of them died there.

Cambodian Nupparot Chronicle also stated that this battle was a Cambodian–Siamese victory and a Vietnamese defeat;

As for the Vietnamese troops, who were increasingly daring, they spread out along all the roads; following the Traleng Keng route, they came to encamp opposite of the Siamese-established camps on the Baren mound and advanced further to assault the fortress of Oudong. The King [Ang Duong] then sent corps of mounted elephants to fight on all the roads, in concert with the land troops. The Vietnamese were defeated, a large number of their soldiers were killed or wounded; the commander Ong Chanh Lanh Binh was killed and Doi On was taken prisoner.

A number of Vietnamese were taken as war captives. Vietnamese Đại Nam thực lục, however, treated this battle as a Vietnamese victory, stating that the Cambodians and the Siamese were defeated and retreated into Oudong citadel. It might be that both sides suffered casualties and retreated to their positions. Thiệu Trị punished the vanguard commander Hồ Đức Tú and some other Vietnamese officers for their recklessness by subjecting them to corporal beating. In October 1845, Thiệu Trị levied 500 men from An Giang, Gia Định, Định Tường and Biên Hòa provinces in Southern Vietnam each to reinforce in Cambodia. Thiệu Trị commanded that the Vietnamese should execute Chaophraya Bodindecha and Ang Duong on the spot, not allowing both of them to retreat to Battambang to regroup. Thiệu Trị appointed more titles to Vietnamese commanders in Cambodia;

- Võ Văn Giải the governor of Saigon and the supreme commander of this campaign was appointed Phủ biên tướng quân tiết chế Trấn Tây (撫邊將軍節制鎮西) or the Border Generalissimo of Cambodia. Lê Văn Phú was reinstated as Tổng đốc Định Biên governor of Saigon to replace Võ Văn Giải.
- Nguyễn Văn Chương was made Khâm sai đại thần (欽差大臣) or Imperial Envoy to Cambodia. He was called Ong Kham Sai in Cambodian chronicles.
- Doãn Uẩn was made Tham tán Đại thần (參贊大臣) or Nguyễn Văn Chương's deputy.
- The Cambodian prince Ang Phim (Nặc Ong Bướm) was made Tuyên phủ (宣撫), an administrative official in order to prepare Ang Phim as the Vietnam-endorsed candidate to Cambodian throne.

=== Second Vietnamese attack on Oudong ===
In October 1845, Chaophraya Bodindecha the Siamese supreme commander at Oudong sent off a captured Vietnamese officer to bring Bodindecha's goodwill letter to Nguyễn Văn Chương (Ong Khamsai) the Vietnamese commander at Kampong Luong. The letter said that both Bodindecha and Ang Duong proposed to make peace with Vietnam for the sake of the populace. Ang Duong also wished he could see his mother Neak Neang Ros (who had been under Vietnamese custody at Châu Đốc with Ang Mey) soon. According to the Cambodian chronicles, Nguyễn Văn Chương rejected this peace proposal right away and even sent the captured Vietnamese officer back to Bodindecha. Vietnamese account told a different story. Nguyễn Văn Chương reported this Siamese peace proposal to Emperor Thiệu Trị at Huế, who discussed this matter with the court ministers. It was then decided that the Vietnamese imperial court should accept this Siamese peace offer for the sake of security of Southern Vietnam at its people;

Conquering the country of Chân Lạp (Cambodia) is as easy as breaking dry branches and rotten wood. Only the matter of letting the people and army to rest is what the court originally considered as a plan to govern the country and pacify the border. Winning a hundred of battles a hundred times is not as good as subduing the enemy without fighting. Moreover, the land of Chân Lạp is vast with forests in many paths. Recently, we have sent people to persuade and appease the Khmers but the Khmers have not yet wholy surrendered. If we manage to prevail over this battle, it will not be possible to avoid future wars. So, why not let them (Cambodia and Siam) bow down two or three times to ask for peace so that our army and people can enjoy a peaceful rest? That is the best policy. But today's Lạp Man (Cambodia) is not the Lạp Man of the past. If everything goes as planned, after the agreement is reached, Nặc Ong Giun (Ang Duong) will have all the [Cambodian] lands. Where will Nặc Ong Bướm (Ang Phim) and Ngọc Vân (Ang Mey) be put?

Thiệu Trị insisted that if Cambodia–Siam became resolved to make peace with Vietnam, they should repatriate Vietnamese people capture by them and Cambodia–Siam should send a friendly diplomatic letter or diplomatic mission to the Vietnamese Emperor at Huế first and Ang Duong should personally bow down to ask Vietnam for forgiveness. However, if the Cambodians–Siamese insisted on fighting, the Vietnamese should continue the offensives to take control of the whole Cambodia. Some of the ministers at Huế considered making peace with Siam too early and premature, saying that Vietnam should take over Cambodia as much as possible as they were in an advantageous position. Thiệu Trị replied that "About the matter of Trấn Tây, I have been preoccupied with it day and night for five years now. Every time a report from the border arrives, I immediately order civil and military officials to meet and discuss it thoroughly. Has there ever been a time when the two words "for peace (cho hòa)" have been used to deal with the matter?" In November 1845, Thiệu Trị appointed Lê Văn Phú the governor of Saigon to be Tổng thống tiễu bộ quân vụ (總統勦捕軍務) of Supreme Military Commander to be another Vietnamese commissioner in Cambodia. Meanwhile, Nguyễn Văn Chương gathered twenty Cambodian nobles who would serve Vietnam to govern Cambodia.

Chaophraya Bodindecha established a defense line along the Bassac River to guard Western Cambodia from possible Vietnamese attacks from the Vietnam-occupied Ba Phnum area in Southeastern Cambodia;

- Phraya Rattanawichit the Siam-appointed governor of Svaychek guarded at Peam Chumnik near Kampong Luong.
- Phra Samdaeng Ritthirong and Phra Narong Ritthidet, two Siamese officials from Nakhon Ratchasima and Phra Phimai the governor of Phimai built three forts to guard at Ponhea Lueu.
- Phraya Phichainarong, a Cambodian–Siamese official from Battambang with personal name Ma, led the Khmer Battambang forces to guard at Bati on the Bassac River.
- Oknha Chetdorong Nearin Vichey led Khmer forces from Khukhan and Kampong Chhnang to guard at Prey Kabbas on the Bassac River.
- Oknha Kralahom Mouk (Minister of Navy) and Oknha Thommeadecho Meas (Governor of Ba Phnum) formed Khmer guerilla forces to attack Vietnamese supply lines in Ba Phnum area.
- Oknha Dechou Snang Ey the governor of Kampong Svay was ordered by Bodindecha to build a fortress at Stoung River.

An epidemic struck on the Vietnamese armies in Cambodia, with Võ Văn Giải the supreme commander of this campaign falling ill. Nguyễn Văn Chương proposed conditions to the Cambodians and the Siamese that they should repatriate the Vietnamese captured by them and Ang Duong himself should send a letter to become a vassal of the Vietnamese Emperor at Huế, setting up a deadline. Bodindecha and Ang Duong were hesitant about these conditions and chose not to response. With the Cambodians–Siamese not responding, Nguyễn Văn Chương decided to conduct new offensives. In November 1845, Nguyễn Văn Chương and Doãn Uẩn marched from Kampong Luong and Ponhea Lueu, respectively, to attack Oudong again. The Vietnamese encamped at Vat Cheydey Thmey and Vat Sbaeng temples to the east of Oudong, while Bodindecha built three-kilometer wall and trench from Vat Vihear Samnor to Preah Reach Troap Mountain in defense. Bodindecha also built two fortresses at Pupey and Vat Veang Chas temple against the Vietnamese. The Siamese utilized the same old tactic of mounting heavy cannons onto the high forts and firing at the enemies. According to Vietnamese record, the Oudong citadel was surrounded by thick forests on all sides with high walls and deep trenches. Half of the soldiers were Siamese (while the other half was Khmer–Lao).

Upon learning about the renewed Siamese–Vietnamese hostilities at Oudong, Emperor Thiệu Trị said "Chất Tri (Chakri, meaning Chaophraya Bodindecha) is a liar. Previously, when he was weak, he asked for peace. I know their plan was to delay our troops. It was only because the ministers deliberately begged for [not to attack] that I could not bear to urge [Vietnamese forces] to advance. I persuaded [Vietnamese forces] to be cautious and not be fooled by the enemies. Now, this is not beyond my calculation." Siamese cannons fired from Siamese fortresses, preventing the Vietnamese from advancing towards Oudong but were not able to dislodge the Vietnamese either, resulting in another Siamese–Vietnamese stalemate in battle.

According to Cambodian and Thai chronicles, this time, it was Ong Khamsai (Nguyễn Văn Chương) who sued for peace, sending letters to Ang Duong for a peace settlement and Ang Duong's submission to Vietnam. Bodindecha and Ang Duong did not trust the Vietnamese so they did not respond at first because Nguyễn Văn Chương had earlier rebuffed Bodindecha's peace offer. However, Bodindecha and Ang Duong soon realized they could not hold out forever. Eventually, after around two weeks of fire exchanges, on 3 December 1845, Chaophraya Bodindecha sent a delegate to the Vietnamese commander Ong Khamsai (Nguyễn Văn Chương) at Kampong Luong that if the Vietnamese were to make peace with Siam, they should repatriate Neak Neang Ros (Ang Duong's mother) and other members of Khmer royal family to Ang Duong. Nguyễn Văn Chương replied that both parties should set up a date and place to discuss. In December 1845, Bodindecha the Siamese delegate and Nguyễn Văn Chương the Vietnamese delegate met at Pupey to the east of Oudong to discuss peace plans concerning Cambodia.

== Siamese–Vietnamese negotiations ==
=== Peace convention at Pupey ===
On December 3, 1845, after five months of this renewed Siamese–Vietnamese military conflict and two months of Vietnamese enclosure on Oudong, Chaophraya Bodindecha the Siamese supreme commander in Cambodia sent Cambodian–Siamese delegates to propose a peace settlement with the Vietnamese commander Nguyễn Văn Chương at Kampong Luong as Nguyễn Văn Chương himself had earlier requested for a peace negotiation with the Siamese. The delegates proposed to Nguyễn Văn Chương that if the Vietnamese were to initiate peace talks, the Vietnamese should repatriate Neak Neang Ros (Ang Duong's mother), along with the Khmers, Cham and Chinese people captured by the Vietnamese, to return to Ang Duong. Nguyễn Văn Chương replied that this was the matter of great importance and should be discussed directly with Bodindecha and Ang Duong. Chaophraya Bodindecha then constructed a wooden thatched house at Pupey or Pobei in the eastern vicinity of Oudong as the place for Siamese–Vietnamese negotiations about Cambodia. In December 1845, on the day of the negotiation, Bodindecha and Ang Duong arrived in Pupey with 500 Cambodian–Siamese men, as well as the Vietnamese commanders Nguyễn Văn Chương and Doãn Uẩn.

Đại Nam thực lục provided a very detailed unfolding of this meeting. Chaophraya Bodindecha arrived on the elephant-back. He dismounted from the elephant and walked barefoot to the meeting house. Nguyễn Văn Chương and Doãn Uẩn entered the house through the left door, while Bodindecha sat in the right. Ang Duong and other Siamese and Cambodian officials knelt down beside Bodindecha in great solemnity. Nguyễn Văn Chương and Doãn Uẩn bowed to Bodindecha in diplomatic gesture and took their seats. Nguyễn Văn Chương asked Bodindecha why Ang Duong had not sent a confessing letter to the Vietnamese Emperor yet. Bodindecha replied that he preferred personal talk rather than communicating through letter because the translator might mistake some of the content. Bodindecha then took out his written proposal written on a black Samutthai with white ink and gave it to Nguyễn Văn Chương, who read this proposal, apparently through a translation;

My business here is that Phrabat Somdet Phrachao Yuhua (Siamese king Rama III) who is of Great Virtue residing in Krung Thep Phra Maha Nakhon (Bangkok) has assigned me, who is a senior Senabodi (minister), to bring Somdet Phra Ong Duang (Ang Duong) the Overlord of the Khmers to reign in Kamphucha Thibodi (Cambodia) to listen to the joy and the sufferings [of Khmer people] in order for the Khmers to be happy and peaceful. I am a senior Senabodi so I am obliged to uphold Somdet Phra Ong Duang to rule Cambodia. Therefore, Ong Khamsai Daithanh (Nguyễn Văn Chương) and Ong Thamtan (Doãn Uẩn) should also similarly support Somdet Phra Ong Duang to ruler over and protect the Khmer populace so that [Khmer people] will live in peace and joy without hardships.

Nguyễn Văn Chương and Doãn Uẩn replied;

Duc Vang Tho Tey (Emperor of Vietnam) has also been gracious to the Cambodian royalty and has also continuously protected Cambodia from the beginning like Siam. Originally, the three states (Cambodia, Siam, Vietnam) used to be in amicable relations, sending diplomatic envoys to each other in regular basis. However, this time, it was because of the upheavals in Cambodia that the two states (Siam and Vietnam) have become enemies. Now, the Duc Vang Tho Tey has sent us both, the senior ministers from Huế, to escort the Royal Mother (Neak Neang Ros), the Royal Daughters (three daughters of Ang Duong who had been under the care of Neak Neang Ros) and other Cambodian royalty to reside in Phnom Penh as our overlord the Duc Vang Tho Tey intends to uphold Cambodia to be peaceful as it has been before and would be forever.

As Nguyễn Văn Chương and Doãn Uẩn proposed to repatriate Cambodian royalty to Ang Duong, Chaophraya Bodindecha replied;

As the desire of the two kingdoms (Siam and Vietnam) is the same (to maintain peace in Cambodia), I request you the two Vietnamese ministers to send all of the Cambodian royalty residing in Phnom Penh to return to Ang Duong at Oudong. When all the Cambodian royalty have been united, I will hold the Abhisekha enthronement ceremony for Somdet Phra Ong Duang to rule Cambodia onwards and we both (Siam and Vietnam) will retreat and retire to our own kingdoms.

Nguyễn Văn Chương and Doãn Uẩn replied "concerning this matter (of Ang Duong's enthronment), we cannot concede to any agreements without consulting [the Vietnamese Emperor Thiệu Trị]. We have to bring the matter to our sovereign first. If our sovereign issues commands, only then we can follow his orders." Bodindecha then pointed to Ang Duong, who had been kneeling beside him, saying "This is Nak Ong Duang. I have entrusted him to collaborate with you. I hope you have mercy on him." Nguyễn Văn Chương then told Ang Duong "If you realize your sins, you should present a letter of confession [to the Emperor]. Only then I can ask for [the Emperor's] forgiveness.". Ang Duong then put his hands together in Sampeah gesture to pay respect to Nguyễn Văn Chương. Ang Duong the prospective King of Cambodia having to kneel beside his Siamese and Vietnamese overseers in humble and deferential manner represented a dark episode of Cambodian history.

Chaophraya Bodindecha seemed to consign that establishing Ang Duong under joint Siamese–Vietnamese suzerainty would be the best way to solve this conflict. However, the Vietnamese had been in a rather advantageous position in the negotiations as they had been holding Ang Duong's mother, daughters and other Cambodian royalty in custody and 'protection' (Ang Duong's mother along with his three daughters were taken by Ang Em when he defected from Battambang to Vietnam in 1839). Also, even though the Vietnamese might accept Ang Duong as the King of Cambodia, they would not tolerate Siamese influence over Ang Duong. The Vietnamese goal was to engulf Ang Duong into Vietnam's influence and to get rid of Siamese domination over Ang Duong by pressuring Bodindecha to retreat away from Cambodia to return to Battambang as soon as possible. Nguyễn Văn Chương suggested that Chaophraya Bodindecha and the Siamese should retreat from Cambodia to return to Siam so that Nguyễn Văn Chương would repatriate the Cambodian royalty the Vietnamese Emperor would hold an enthronement ceremony for Ang Duong. Bodindecha refused, saying that he has been guilty of leading the Siamese to lose battles at Peam Meanchey, Banteay Daek and at Phnom Penh. Bodindecha insisted that he would stay until the matter of Ang Duong's enthronement was complete to make up for his failures. Bodindecha also exerted that only the Siamese king could invest Ang Duong as a rightful King of Cambodia.

=== Siamese–Vietnamese peace settlement of 1845 ===
In early December 1845, just before the Siamese–Vietnamese convention at Pupey, the Vietnamese Emperor Thiệu Trị allowed the rump pro-Vietnamese Cambodian court at Đa Phước (north of Châu Đốc) to move to the Vietnam-occupied Phnom Penh. Cambodian royalty, including Princesses Ang Mey, Ang Peou, Ang Sngoun, Neak Neang Ros (Ang Duong's mother), three daughters of Ang Duong and Neak Neang Krachap (Ang Mey's mother), along with pro-Vietnamese Cambodian ministers Chauvea Tolaha Long and Samdech Chauponhea Hu, were moved to Phnom Penh to join the Prince Ang Phim who had already been there.

Vietnamese Nguyen imperial court would accept Ang Duong as the King of Cambodia, who, in turn, would rule over Cambodia as a vassal of Vietnam (as well as Siam), sending triennial tributes to Huế in the same manner as it had been during the reign of the pro-Vietnamese King Ang Chan. It was a general understanding in that time that Ang Duong gave up his claims over Khmer Krom towns of Southern Vietnam as a part of his agreement with Vietnam in order for the Vietnamese to release his family and to accept him as the King of Cambodia. Thai Phraya Ratchadet's Chronicles (1875) stated that, in the peace settlement with the Vietnamese, Ang Duong relinquished his claims over the towns of Chodok (Châu Đốc), Bassac (Ba Xuyên, modern Sóc Trăng), Preah Trapeang (Lạc Hóa, modern Trà Vinh) and Kramuon Sar (Rạch Giá). This notion also appeared in Adhémard Leclère's Histoire du Cambodge (1914) as "C'est à partir de ce traité que les Cambodgiens commencèrent à évacuer les provinces qui font maintenant partie de la Cochinchine que les Yuons s'étaient annexées dans le passé," (It was from this treaty that the Cambodians began to evacuate the provinces that are now part of Cochinchina, which the Vietnamese had annexed in the past.).

In the peace convention of Pupey, both Chaophraya Bodindecha and Nguyễn Văn Chương agreed to dismantle Siamese and Vietnamese battle fortifications and retreat to their bases at Oudong and Phnom Penh, respectively. According to Thai record, after the peace agreement, the Siamese and the Vietnamese could intermingle and visit each other freely between their bases. Nguyễn Văn Chương also demanded repatriation of Nguyễn Bá Hựu (called Ong Pham Phang in Cambodian chronicles), who had earlier been abducted by Oknha Luchakrey Pang in April 1845, along with 44 Vietnamese and Cham people, who had been captured from Southern Vietnam by the Cambodian Oknhas. Chaophraya Bodindecha told Nguyễn Văn Chương that these people had already been deported to be resettled in Bangkok and their repatriation required royal consent from the Siamese king. Nguyễn Văn Chương stressed that, in order for the peace terms to materialize, these Vietnamese subjects should be returned to Vietnam.

Nguyễn Văn Chương informed Thiệu Trị about the Siamese–Vietnamese negotiation at Pupey. Thiệu Trị was not satisfied as he could not understand why the Vietnamese had to make peace with the Siamese because, according to the reports he had received, the Vietnamese always prevailed, wondering whether he had appointed Lê Văn Phú to be the new commissioner in Cambodia for nothing. Nevertheless, Thiệu Trị trusted his commanders, saying the commanders could handle the affairs in Cambodia as they saw fit, albeit with careful consideration.

Next day after the peace negotiation, Ang Duong wrote a letter of apology to Emperor Thiệu Trị, asking for forgiveness on behalf of the Cambodian Oknhas for the earlier Cambodian uprising against Vietnamese rule in 1840; "All the Khmer Oknhas of the regional towns were guilty and ignorant, not knowing what was right and what was wrong. I beg [the Vietnamese court] to forgive them.". Ang Duong's letter was delivered to Nguyễn Văn Chương at Kampong Luong. The Vietnamese expected the Siamese diplomatic letter from Bodindecha, which did not arrive. Thiệu Trị said that he was satisfied with Ang Duong's confession and did not care whether Siam would send a letter or not. Shortly after, the Vietnamese commanders in Cambodia including Nguyễn Tri Phương, Lê Văn Phú, Tôn Thất Bạch, Doãn Uẩn and Nguyễn Văn Hoàng petitoned to the Vietnamese Emperor for the withdrawal from Oudong per the peace terms;

Since last year until now, because of the Khmer invaders, the provinces of Nam Kỳ (Southern Vietnam, Cochinchina) have been constantly mobilized, while the troops from the capital (Huế) have been staying for three years. Now that Chất Tri (Bodindecha) has come to ask for peace and Nặc Ong Giun (Ang Duong) has presented a letter to admit his guilts, we have taken a superior stance. Temporarily agreeing to a peace is not a loss of dignity. Now, our navy have been taking position at Ô Đông (Oudong) citadel. Perhaps we can destroy the enemy's bases and take over the entire Cambodia territory. These are something we will be proud of but the enemies will be humiliated. Even though it is peaceful today, it may not be tomorrow. We are afraid there will be no end to our military campaign! Moreover, the weather has reached the dry season and our troops have no access to water. The wind is scorching hot and many people have become sick. If we let the army to stay exhausted for a long time, not only it will be useless but it will also waste wages, not a good plan. Moreover, the way of ruling over the barbarians is that when they rebel, we beat and terrify them and when they surrender we comfort them. The Cambodian people now have come to surrender. We plead Your Imperial Highness that Giun (Ang Duong) and Ngọc Vân (Ang Mey) be allowed to rule over the Khmer people.

Emperor Thiệu Trị consented to the withdrawal of the Vietnamese troops from Oudong, not for the sake of the Cambodians but rather for the sake of Vietnamese people, saying "Our imperial court thinks that our army and our people are of importance. We cannot bear to cause hardships to the people we love just to help the people we hate." Thiệu Trị also pardoned Ang Duong for his 'crimes'. In late December 1845, Chaophraya Bodindecha dismantled Cambodian–Siamese fortifications on the battlefield and all his forces retreated into Oudong citadel. However, an army of more than 2,000 Khmers attacked one of the Vietnamese forts, killing a Vietnamese officer there. The Khmers later apologized, saying that they had not yet been informed about the peace settlement. In January 1846, Bodindecha sent Siamese official Phraya Chaiwichit Kham (Governor of Ayutthaya), Cambodian officials Oknha Yomreach Prom (Ang Duong's Prime Minister) and Oknha Thireach Montrey Pech to Bangkok to plead the Siamese king Rama III to release Nguyễn Bá Hựu and the forty-four Vietnamese. In February 1846, Nguyễn Văn Chương, Doãn Uẩn and the Vietnamese dismantled their fortresses at Kampong Luong, Ponhea Lueu and retreated to Phnom Penh. However, the Vietnamese also left 400 men under Lê Đình Lý to stay behind on the riverbank to the east of Oudong, without Siamese knowledge. The Vietnamese also took the whole rice storage with them down to Phnom Penh, leaving the Siamese at Oudong starving.

=== Siamese–Vietnamese occupation of Cambodia ===
As the Siamese and the Vietnamese retreated from the battlefront to Oudong and Phnom Penh, respectively, in early 1846, Cambodia was again partitioned into Siamese and Vietnamese occupying zones. The Vietnamese occupied the Ba Phnum area of Southeastern Cambodia plus the Phnom Penh Quatre Bras vicinity. The rest of Cambodia was more or less controlled by Ang Duong, who had been under Siamese influence. According to Thai chronicles, the Vietnamese built a fortress at Phnom Penh as their base and opened a large market in Phnom Penh, allowing Cambodian and Vietnamese merchants to trade. Uneasy peace kept the conflict away as both parties struggled to fulfill the peace terms. Siam reluctantly allowed Ang Duong, who had been pampered and groomed by Siam to be the candidate to Cambodian kingship since 1841, to humble himself to become a vassal of Vietnam. Vietnam also reluctantly accepted Ang Duong, whom they had been at war with since 1841, to be the King of Cambodia. Vietnam's preferred candidate had always been the Princess Ang Mey. Both Siam and Vietnam had to relinquish some of their advantages and influence over Cambodia in order to realize the peace.

In February 1846, after the Vietnamese withdrawal from Oudong, Võ Văn Giải the Vietnamese supreme commander, who was less being a hardliner than Nguyễn Văn Chương, petitioned to Emperor Thiệu Trị to allow Ang Duong's mother to join Ang Duong as soon as possible or else Ang Duong would be upset, risking jeopardizing the peace terms. Thiệu Trị allowed Ang Duong's mother Neak Neang Ros to be returned to Ang Duong at Oudong. However, according to Cambodian and Thai chronicles, it was not until eight months later in October 1846 that Neak Neang Ros was actually returned to Ang Duong. It was possible that Nguyễn Văn Chương would not allow Ang Duong to have his mother without repatriating Nguyễn Bá Hựu. The whole 1846 year was wasted on both sides anxiously waiting out for each other to fulfill peace terms.

Earlier, Chaophraya Bodindecha had placed Cambodian–Siamese troops along the Bassac River to defend against possible Vietnamese attack from Ba Phnum. Tension remained high between both parties as the process of repatriating Nguyễn Bá Hựu from Siam was astonishingly slow. Despite the peace agreement, the frontline Khmer forces seemed to be rather active. In March 1846, a Cambodian force of a few hundreds approached the Vĩnh Tế Canal. In July 1846, Cambodian forces attacked Hà Tiên but was repelled by the Lãnh binh commander Nguyễn Văn Do. Võ Văn Giải also reported that the Siamese were planning to attack the Vietnam-occupied Ba Phnum area.

The Vietnamese eventually discovered the Siamese defense line along the western side of the Bassac River and saw this as a threat. Võ Văn Giải reported that there were 2,000 men in Bati (Hoá Di) to the south of Phnom Penh on the Bassac River, 1,500 men in Lvea Aem (Lô Viên) to the east of Phnom Penh on the Mekong and another 1,000 men approaching Hà Tiên through the Giang Thành River. The Siamese had also built two forts on both sides of the mouth of Prek Thnot River (Thuyết Nột, in modern Ta Khmau) in the southern vicinity of Phnom Penh, directly facing the Vietnamese. Nguyễn Văn Chương responded by fortifying Phnom Penh with high earthen walls. In August 1846, the Cambodian–Siamese forces approached the Vĩnh Tế Canal in similar manner to the previous Siamese attempt to destroy the canal in early 1842. Despite tension, actual fighting did not break out.

Eventually, on 13 October 1846, the Vietnamese released Ang Duong's mother Neak Neang Ros, Ang Duong's three daughters and Ang Duong's consort Neak Moneang Eu (mother of two of the three daughters) from Phnom Penh to Oudong. The whole entourage consisted of thirty-four people. Separated since 1838 when Ang Duong was taken prisoner to Bangkok, Ang Duong was finally united with his mother, daughters and consort. The Vietnamese, however, retained Princesses Ang Mey, Ang Peou, Ang Sngoun and Prince Ang Phim, who were not closely related to Ang Duong. Cambodian royal regalia, including the Royal Sword Preah Khan Reach, were still in the possession of Ang Mey. The Vietnamese then laid out conditions that, if Ang Duong wanted the rest of the Cambodian royal family, he should send a diplomatic mission to Huế to officially profess himself to be a vassal of Vietnam. Ang Duong did not give answer to this new Vietnamese term, saying that he had to acquire a consensus on this matter from his Oknha nobility. The Vietnamese also asked about Nguyễn Bá Hựu and the forty-four Chams–Vietnamese, to which Ang Duong replied that he had sent his delegates to ask the Siamese king to release those Vietnamese subjects from Bangkok and the Vietnamese should wait for three months, promising a deadline.

In December 1846, the Siamese found out that the Cambodian town of Pursat, which had been sending the tribute of seventy piculs of the valuable cardamoms to Siamese court, could only produce sixty piculs of cardamoms for Siam this year. The Siamese then had eight Cambodian officials in Pursat imprisoned for the failure to meet the Siamese tribute demand. Two Khmer officials in Pursat, Montrey Ben and Thuppedey Bien, fled from Pursat to seek refuge with the Vietnamese at Phnom Penh. Võ Văn Giải sent a delegate to inform Chaophraya Bodindecha at Oudong that two Khmer officials from Pursat had sought Vietnamese aid. Chaophraya Bodindecha and Ang Duong asked for the return of Ang Mey and the remaining members of Cambodian royalty, who had been in Vietnamese custody. Vietnamese Emperor Thiệu Trị commented on the perceived Siam's reluctance to fulfill the peace terms; "Chất Tri (meaning Chaophraya Bodindecha) is still treacherous and unpredictable. The matter of peace negotiations has been dragging on for a year now, often the military bring the matter to report. The imperial court thinks that the [Vietnamese] military and people have been forced to follow the peace terms. Now, the Siamese are using this matter of reunion and sweet talks to evade the terms, postponing deadlines, waiting for favorable winds and currents." Thiệu Trị then sent more troops from Huế into Cambodia to prepare for a possible resurgence of the Siamese–Vietnamese War. Thiệu Trị also called Bodindecha a cunning man, insisting that the Vietnamese commissioners in Cambodia should make the Siamese leave Cambodia as soon as possible and should not allow Bodindecha to influence Ang Duong;

Lạp Mên (Cambodia) is under the control of Chất Tri (Bodindecha). Giun (Ang Duong) is not free [from Siamese influence]. However, the [Vietnamese] mandarins [in Cambodia] have never asked Chất Tri when he will return to Siam to make it convenient for [Vietnamese] army to withdraw. Only then the peace will be achieved. If Chất Tri absolutely wanted Giun to reunite with his family and to jointly rule over the Khmer people [with Ang Mey], then how Giun (Ang Duong) and Ngọc Vân (Ang Mey), both being Khmer chiefs, will address each other? Supposed they are both invested with the same title, if the Khmers rebelled against Siam, will the Siamese honor these peace terms? If Bướm (Ang Phim) submitted to us, can the Khmer chiefs not be suspicious? Should Giun in Ô Đông (Oudong) and Ngọc Vân in Nam Vang (Phnom Penh) stay together or be separated? And after they are reunited, can we prevent doubts and resentments? If we do not achieve a clear solution [for these issues], focusing only on peace-seeking, we may offend the Khmers and fall into [Siamese] schemes.

Thiệu Trị ordered Vietnamese commissioners in Cambodia to clarify the intention of Chaophraya Bodindecha, whether the Siamese still wanted to follow the peace terms previously agreed. If the Siamese were still committed to the peace terms they should fulfill their promises. If the Siamese remained reluctant, the Vietnamese commanders in Cambodia should rally troops and weapons in preparation for the prospective renewed conflict. In late December 1846, as the three-month deadline arrived, Võ Văn Giải and Nguyễn Văn Chương, the two supreme Vietnamese commanders in Cambodia, sent delegates to ask Bodindecha and Ang Duong at Oudong to clarify the issues. Bodindecha and Ang Duong replied with the same answer that they had sent officials to procure Nguyễn Bá Hựu and the forty-four Vietnamese subjects as the process was under way. Bodindecha told the Vietnamese to wait for another one month. Võ Văn Giải and Nguyễn Văn Chương became furious and replied that if the Siamese did not manage to satisfy the promised terms by the upcoming Vietnamese New Year (February 1847), the Siamese should prepare for war and this time the Vietnamese would conquer Cambodia.

=== Siamese consent to peace terms ===
After the Siamese–Vietnamese peace convention at Pupey in December 1845, Chaophraya Bodindecha the Siamese supreme commander and the Siamese troops had been stationing in Oudong in a rather disadvantageous position as they faced the same usual problem, the rice shortage. The Siamese court transported rice from Bangkok through Prachinburi and Chanthaburi to Bodindecha at Oudong but it was a long route. Meanwhile, rice was plentiful for the Vietnamese in Phnom Penh as the Vietnamese Emperor Thiệu Trị had ordered a great amount of rice from Southern Vietnam transported to Phnom Penh. The Siamese in Oudong relied on the pro-Siam Khmers to buy rice from the pro-Vietnam Khmers at Phnom Penh to feed them. In late December 1846, as the Vietnamese had delivered the ultimatum, Bodindecha also learned that the Vietnamese were amassing troops, rice and other provisions from Southern Vietnam to Phnom Penh, apparently in preparation for a new war. Facing Siamese elephants last time, the Vietnamese also brought three hundred war elephants of their own.

The process of repatriation of Vietnamese subjects was slow because the Siamese king Nangklao was rather reluctant to make peace with Vietnam. Chaophraya Bodindecha himself had earlier proposed many peace terms to Vietnam during past wars, all of which were viewed as ingenuine by the Vietnamese, who saw that Bodindecha only pretended to make peace as a tactic to buy time for the Siamese to recuperate and to regain strength. Bodindecha also realized that the Khmers on Siamese side under Ang Duong had become exhausted and demoralized. Siamese garrison in Oudong became a desperate stand. Ang Duong's Cambodian officials petitioned to Bodindecha to make peace with Vietnam. In early January 1847, Chaophraya Bodindecha reported to the Siamese king at Bangkok that Siamese situation in Cambodia had become helpless as the Vietnamese were reinforcing and the pro-Siam Khmers did not want further wars. Bodindecha asked the king to decide whether to go on war or to make peace. Siamese king Rama III thought that the Vietnamese were deceiving Siam, promising to return the Cambodian princesses and threatening to attack, which King Rama did not believe the Vietnamese would actually do because of the economic cost of the campaign. Any further Vietnamese military operations in Cambodia would render Vietnamese presence in Cambodia unprofitable. King Rama speculated that the Vietnamese would rather retain the princesses as their own candidates to challenge Ang Duong;

The Vietnamese are never trustworthy, always being grandiose and seeking to take advantage. In the First Reign of the Royal Ancestor (Rama I), they asked to take Banthaimat (Hà Tiên). In the reign of the Holy King in the Royal Urn (Rama II), they seized Cambodia to themselves. To this incumbent reign (Rama III), they seized Vientiane lands. I have run out of patience. Why did the Vietnamese asked for peace? Do the Vietnamese unable to fight our soldiers? Previously, when the Vietnamese returned Ang Duong's mother, daughters and consort, it was their scheme that, because detaining Ang Duong's mother, daughters and consort is useless, wasting money and food, they rather return them to Ang Duong in order to lure Ang Duong to their side so that the Vietnamese can flatter themselves, so that the Khmers will see a better light in the Vietnamese as King Thiaou Tri (Thiệu Trị) harbors no resentment [towards the Khmers]. It is a new sentiment to replace the old sentiment, because King Min Mang (Minh Mạng) had done calamitous things to the Khmers so the Khmers broke away from Vietnam. As the Vietnamese have asked Ang Duong to send envoys to bring tributes to the King of Vietnam and to send a letter pleading them to return the [Khmer] princesses nieces, I think that the Vietnamese will not return the princesses as they will continue to promote the princesses [as their own candidates] to secede Cambodia [from Ang Duong]. For them, returning the princesses meant giving up Cambodia to Ang Duong. Because the Vietnamese have reaped so much benefits from Cambodia, they loved to possess Cambodia so they spent food resources and marched troops to pursue to reclaim Cambodia but they were defeated, wasting many lives and they have become too stingy to spend any more resources. They will certainly not easily surrender the princesses. About the matter of Ang Duong promising to petition for the return of those Chams and Vietnamese, if I am willing to I will consent. If I am not willing to, I will decide in the third month. If the deadline arrives, the Vietnamese will surely come to talk. Ang Duong should reply to them that if the Vietnamese return the princesses to Ang Duong, reuniting as a family, allowing Ang Duong to administer Cambodia so that the Khmer people will be in peace like the reign of Ang Eng as King of Cambodia, not only the forty-four Vietnamese, I can return all of the Vietnamese previously taken to Bangkok.

King Rama III commanded Ang Duong to reply to the Vietnamese that the process of repatriation of those Vietnamese subjects was being under royal consideration. The Siamese king would give answer in the third month of Thai calendar (late January 1847). If the Vietnamese returned the remaining Cambodian royal family and allowed Ang Duong to rule Cambodia under strong Siamese domination like in the second reign of King Ang Eng (1794–1797), only then Siam would make peace with Vietnam. Bodindecha and Ang Duong, however, saw that the renewed Vietnamese invasion was imminent if they did not make peace with Vietnam. If the Vietnamese attacked, the Siamese would be less likely to prevail, given their disadvantageous situation and Ang Duong's Cambodian officials, out of desperation, would denounce Siam and defect to join the Vietnamese. Bodindecha and had Ang Duong send a diplomatic mission to bring tributes to the Vietnamese Emperor at Huế. All the Oknhas were afraid to go to Vietnam because they feared they would be detained by the Vietnamese. Eventually, Ang Duong assigned Oknha Reachdechea Nong, who was the acting Chakrey or War Minister, as the chief envoy of the mission. Reachdechea Nong would go to Huế with his son Oknha Thonea Thuppedey Ros and his colleague Oknha Bavorneayok Koi.

Chaophraya Bodindecha then beseeched the Siamese king Nangklao that making peace with Vietnam was the only way to resolve the issues. Due to many disadvantages and limitations, Siam could not win over Cambodia by force this time. Moreover, Bodindecha said that most of the experienced Siamese commanders, Bodindecha's colleagues in the previous wars, had died either in battles or in old age (Chaophraya Nakhon Ratchasima Thong-in had died in 1845. Chaophraya Yommaraj Bunnak had just died in December 1846, a month earlier). Bodindecha revealed that he was now working with mostly new faces in military commands. The risk of waging a new war was too high. Lastly, Bodindecha pleaded King Nangklao to release the Vietnamese subjects per the Vietnamese request. In March 1847, King Nangklao finally released Nguyễn Bá Hựu and the forty-four Cham–Vietnamese people from Bangkok, who were led by Phraya Chaiwichit Kham and Oknha Yomreach Prom to Cambodia. The Siamese king also told Bodindecha that "Chaophraya Bodindecha has been at the frontline, knowing everything, he should do whatever he sees fit."

=== Ang Duong's mission to Huế ===
After about one year after the Siamese–Vietnamese peace settlement at Pupey in December 1845, Ang Duong assigned his subordinates Oknha Reachdechea Nong, Oknha Thonea Thuppedey Ros (son of Reachdechea Nong) and Oknha Bavorneayok Koi as his envoys in January 1847 to bring Ang Duong's diplomatic letter and tributary goods including 50 chong (around 18 kg, see Cambodian units of measurement) of cardamoms, 50 chong of bastard cardamoms, 50 chong of gamboge, 50 chong of lac, 50 chong of beeswax, two rhinoceros horns, two elephant tusks and twenty pots of liquid lacquer, which were nearly identical to the Cambodian tributes sent by King Ang Chan to the Vietnamese Emperor Gia Long in the 1810s, in order for Ang Duong to submit himself to become a vassal of Vietnam. The three Oknha delegates of Ang Duong departed from the Kampong Luong riparian pier of Oudong on 22 January 1847, travelling along the Tonle Sap River to reach the Vietnam-occupied Phnom Penh. Oknha Reachdechea Nong brought Ang Duong's letter into the Vietnamese fortress at Phnom Penh to present the letter to the four Vietnamese commissioners of Cambodia in an audience, during which the four commissioners including Ong Tiangkun (Võ Văn Giải), Ong Khamsai (Nguyễn Văn Chương), Ong Thamtan (Doãn Uẩn) and Ong Tongthong (Lê Văn Phú) were seated on an elevated platform. Ang Duong's letter was translated into Vietnamese language;

I, the Cambodian chief Sá Ong Giun (Ang Duong) bow his head to respectfully plead the [Vietnamese] Emperor that, in the past, my father (Ang Eng) and my elder brother (Ang Chan) were servants [of the Vietnamese Emperors]. Since I have wandered and relied on Siam for many years, the Cambodian nobles asked me to return to rule over the Khmer people. As soon as my armies advanced on land to Ô Đông (Oudong), I immediately led my subjects to confess the crimes and have asked the [Vietnamese] military commander [in Cambodia] to bring the matter to the [Vietnamese imperial] court. The military commander then reported to the court, thanking the [Vietnamese] Emperor for his grace of forgiving my mother, my daughters and my consort who had previously been taken care of [by the Vietnamese] and for allowing them to return to reunite [with me]. I and my subjects look up to the Emperor as the grace of the Emperor is as great as the sky and the earth. [Due to the grace] from him, Khmer people, big and small, from now on, will enjoy the peace forever. All [of us] are moved beyond measure, not knowing how to repay! Therefore, as I bow from a distant border, I plead [the Emperor] to accept me as your loyal and perpetual subject. Now, I entrust my officials Ốc Nha Lịch Y Giá Non (Oknha Reachdechea Nong), Ốc Nha Bô Na Đốc Côi (Oknha Bavorneayok Koi) and Ốc Nha Thôn Na Tiếp Bà Đê Đột (Oknha Thonea Thuppedey Ros) as the Chief Envoy, the Second Envoy and the Third Envoy, respectively, along with another ten followers on my behalf to respectfully present this letter and the gifts of two male elephants, two elephant tusks, two rhinoceros horns, 50 chong of cardamoms, 50 chong of bastard cardamoms, 50 chong of gamboge, 50 chong of lac, 50 chong of beeswax and 20 pots of lacquer to the Capital (Huế) through the Ministry of Rites (Lễ Bộ) in order to pay homage. I hope you consider my sincerity so that I can be a thousand times more professed to be your subject. I offer tributes and may the Emperor of Heaven live a long life, as long as heaven and earth.

The Vietnamese commissioners at Phnom Penh sent the translated version of Ang Duong's letter to the Vietnamese imperial court at Huế. The Vietnamese Emperor Thiệu Trị accepted Ang Duong's diplomatic gesture so that the Vietnamese forces in Cambodia could peacefully retreat after the long protracted war. Thiệu Trị the casting of a bronze seal of the title Cao Miên quốc vương (高棉國王) or "King of Khmer" to Ang Duong. Thiệu Trị also gave permission for the Vietnamese commanders in Cambodia to withdraw forces from Cambodia if Cambodia was pacified.

On 28 January 1847, the three ambassadors of Ang Duong visited the pro-Vietnamese Cambodian court of Ang Mey in Phnom Penh. The ambassadors met the Cambodian royalty including the Princesses Ang Mey, Ang Peou, Ang Sngoun and the Prince Ang Phim, also the pro-Vietnamese Cambodian ministers including Chauvea Tolaha Long and Samdech Chauponhea Hu. Next day, on January 29, the Vietnamese organized a riparian procession for the Cambodian envoys to carry Ang Duong's letter and tributary goods to Huế, departing from Phnom Penh, going down the Bassac River to reach Châu Đốc on January 30. The procession continued along the rivers through the Mekong Delta, reaching Saigon on February 5, 1847. Trần Văn Trung the governor of Saigon arranged for the envoys to rest but the Cambodian envoys could not meet with any of the Vietnamese governors as they were obliged to have an audience with the Emperor first. Trần Văn Trung reported to the imperial court, who granted the permission for the Cambodian envoys to travel to Huế.

Trần Văn Trung organized a grand procession to carry the Cambodian mission to Huế, in which the three envoys of Ang Duong were carried on palanquins and the tributes carried by the Vietnamese porters. Lê Khắc Nhượng the Bố chính of Gia Định accompanied the Cambodian envoys to Huế. The envoys left Saigon on February 13, 1847, travelling along the Vietnamese coast to eventually reach the imperial city of Huế in March, taking about one month in journey. Phan Thanh Giản, the Minister of Rites, was responsible for the ceremonies. Phan Thanh Giản made sure the Cambodian delegate Oknha Reachdechea Nong correctly perform the Ngũ bái or Five Obeisances to the Emperor. Emperor Thiệu Trị stated that Cambodia had been a tributary state of Vietnam for twelve generations since the reign of Emperor Thái Tông (meaning the Nguyen Lord Nguyễn Phúc Tần, who sent armies to dethrone King Ramathipadi I in 1658 and appointed Chey Chettha IV as King of Cambodia in 1675) and the Emperor Thế Tổ Cao hoàng đế (Gia Long, r. 1802–1820) had brought peace to Cambodia. Thiệu Trị opinioned that Vietnam had always been the peace-bringer to Cambodia, establishing the Trấn Tây province (1835–1841) to govern Cambodia. However, things had taken the negative turn, which Thiệu Trị blamed on the 'crimes' of the two officials Dương Văn Phong and Trương Minh Giảng. As the latest war had been going on for seven or eight years then, causing hardships to the Vietnamese people, Thiệu Trị was resolved to reconcile with and forgive Ang Duong for the sake of peace and security.

On 22 March 1847, the Cambodian mission was granted an imperial audience with the Vietnamese Emperor Thiệu Trị in the Imperial City of Huế. When the Emperor arrived to be seated on a platform, Oknha Reachdechea Nong the Chief Cambodian Envoy bowed and prostrated five times before the Emperor in the Ngũ bái gesture in the courtyard and then knelt down, holding a box containing Ang Duong's letter above his head. A translator then read the Vietnamese version of the content of Ang Duong's letter to the Emperor. After finishing the letter, Emperor Thiệu Trị retired to his residence without saying a single word to the Cambodian envoy. The Cambodian envoys stayed in Huế until five days later on March 26 when Phan Thanh Giản summoned the envoys to receive the Emperor's responding letter. The Cambodian envoys performed Ngũ bái to pay respect to the Emperor's letter. Phan Thanh Giản then read the imperial letter to the Cambodians, which said that the Emperor had endorsed Ang Duong as King of Cambodia and entrusted Ang Duong to rule Cambodia with virtue in the same manner as Ang Duong's father and elder brother. The Emperor also assigned Ang Mey to rule Cambodia with Ang Duong. On March 28, the Cambodian ambassadors paid respect to the Emperor Thiệu Trị to say goodbye. Thiệu Trị granted fine Vietnamese silk and Vietnamese official robes to the three envoys and to Ang Duong. The envoys departed from Huế on March 30, 1847, to return to Cambodia. During their return journey, the Cambodian envoys learned that French warships had attacked the port town of Quảng Nam province (Da Nang, also called Tourane, Bombardment of Tourane, 15 April 1847).

=== Vietnamese enthronement of Ang Duong ===
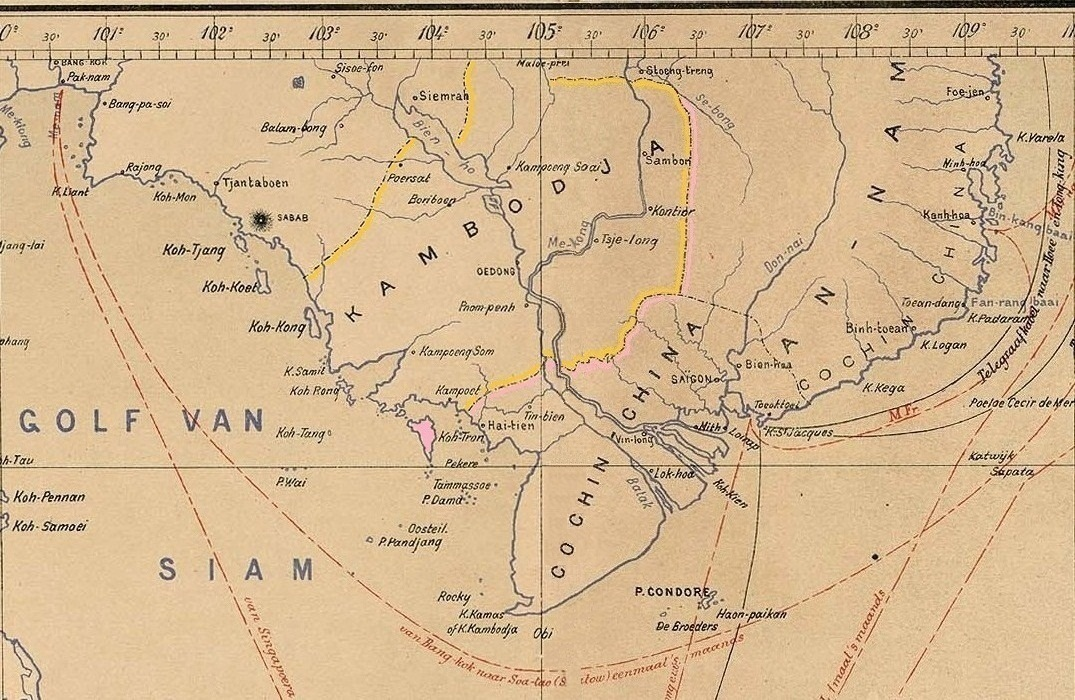
Map of Cambodia and Cochinchina

Emperor Thiệu Trị assigned Lê Khắc Nhượng, who had accompanied the Cambodian envoys to Huế, as the imperial delegate to bring to seals to appoint Ang Duong as Cao Miên quốc vương (高棉國王) or King of Cambodia and to reinstate Princess Ang Mey, who had earlier been demoted by Minh Mạng to Princess of Mỹ Lâm (Mỹ Lâm quận chúa) in 1840, as Cao Miên quận chúa (高棉郡主) or District Princess of Cambodia, technically the Queen Regnant of Cambodia. Thiệu Trị appointed Ang Duong and Ang Mey to be co-rulers to jointly rule over Cambodia. The three ambassadors of Ang Duong returned to Saigon on 22 April 1847. At Châu Đốc, the Cambodian mission was informed that the Vietnamese Emperor was to appoint Ang Duong and Ang Mey as co-rulers. Lê Khắc Nhượng arrived in Cambodia to fulfill his task. Oknha Reachdechea Nong eventually returned to Kampong Luong on 2 May 1847. Lê Khắc Nhượng brought the Cao Miên quốc vương seal to Ang Duong at Oudong on May 9, while the Cao Miên quận chúa seal was granted to Ang Mey at Phnom Penh. Lê Khắc Nhượng held the investiture ceremony for Ang Duong at Oudong. After the ceremony, Lê Khắc Nhượng told Ang Duong that he was allowed to send delegates to fetch the remaining Cambodian royalty from Phnom Penh. Chaophraya Bodindecha sent Oknha Reachdechea the Chief Envoy from Oudong to Bangkok, where he provided the testimony on his diplomatic mission to Vietnam to the Siamese authority, producing a detailed account of his journey that survives today.

In separate ceremonies, both Ang Duong and Ang Mey dressed in Vietnamese officialdom costumes to perform Ngũ bái to bow and prostrate to the edicts of the Vietnamese Emperor placed on a table five times in Confucian rituals at Oudong and Phnom Penh, respectively. This was the third investiture of Cambodian rulers by the Nguyen dynasty (The first one was for Ang Chan in 1807 at Oudong. The second one was for Ang Mey in 1835 at Phnom Penh). Lê Khắc Nhượng then read the imperial edict of the Emperor Thiệu Trị;

Sá Ong Giun (Ang Duong), a descendant of the country of Cao Miên (Cambodia), in a corner of the sky, the land of the Khmers is far away, your ancestors have been paying tributes for two hundred years. The people of that land, thousands of dặm away, have long been virtuous. The country was composed of water and land so when paying tribute there were boats and carriages available [to pay tributes]. The border is in the southwest [of Vietnam]. Their peaceful life was happy, just observing the trees and grasses. Previously, because your brother (Ang Chan) lacked a son, the daughter (Ang Mey) succeeded to the throne. To that point, the land of Lạp (Khmer) entered the chaos. The border was laid waste. Thinking of his country in turmoil, he sought a way to quell it, showing off his power in nine battles, aiming for security. Since Ô Đông (Oudong) has followed [imperial] order, [entering] the northern gate of the [imperial] city, coming as close as the Emperor's yard, paying tributes like a tributary king. [The Emperor] considers [Ang Duong] sincere, serving the great country, has shown respect and sincerity. First, the name must be established and the ceremony must be solemn. As heaven and earth give birth to all things, cultivating and protecting them is inherently unintentional but the imperial court advises from afar and your actions have still been meaningful. Now, I specially appoint you as Cao Miên quốc vương (King of Cambodia), and grant you the seal to cooperate with the Cao Miên quận chúa Ngọc Vân (Ang Mey) to rule over the Khmers. The king (Ang Duong) must be grateful to His Imperial Majesty (the Emperor) and be a proper vassal, maintaining the peace of his country.

Chaophraya Bodindecha observed the Vietnamese investiture of Ang Duong, which happened on 9 May 1847, from afar. To Thiệu Trị, Ang Duong was an outsider who had come to submit, reluctantly accepted to achieve a peace deal with Siam. Thiệu Trị, however, had more amicable words for Ang Mey, who had been considered a long-time ally of Vietnam;

Mỹ Lâm quận chúa named Ngọc Vân (Ang Mey) is the daughter of the late Phiên vương (Vassal king) named Nặc Ong Chăn (Ang Chan). Her predecessors have been the vassals of the Celestial Dynasty (Nguyen dynasty) for a long time, holding a tributary position. Your father, unfortunately, lacked a son. You are a woman and you understood the meaning [of it]. Your father had loved you very much and our [imperial] court also loves small countries, caring for orphans and has been thinking so much about you. Previously, our court had appointed you as Cao Miên quận chúa but because of your country's many affairs and a feud arose so we changed your title to Mỹ Lâm quận chúa. Now that the emperor's army has moved to the West, your country is at peace again. Your uncle Sá Ong Giun (Ang Duong) has repented his sins and has submitted to the court to offer tribute. I have seen his sincerity and specially appointed him as Cao Miên quốc vương (King of Cambodia) to show the benevolent intention [of my court] in rebuilding the lost country, continuing the lineage and expanding that loving and comforting intention. Thinking that the two words "Cao Miên" is the old title of your ancestors before being granted titles, it is also a good name for you to be granted, the vassal state has been left over from the past, the titles of each generation should also be derived from the past. I command a special mandate for the official of the An Giang province, the Bố chính named Hoàng Thu, appointed as Khâm sứ (Imperial Envoy), to bring the imperial edict and confer upon you the title of Cao Miên quận chúa. to cooperate with the Cao Miên quốc vương named Sá Ong Giun (Ang Duong) the ruler of the Khmers to uphold your father's legacy.

Ang Duong sent his ministers Samdech Chauponhea Ros, Oknha Kralahom Mouk and Oknha Chet to bring Ang Mey and the rest of the Cambodian royalty to Oudong. Eventually, on 20 May 1847, Võ Văn Giải the Vietnamese commissioner of Cambodia released the remaining Cambodian royalty from Phnom Penh, including Ang Mey, Ang Peou, Ang Sngoun, Ang Phim, consorts and children of the previously deceased kings and princes, to join Ang Duong at Oudong, along with the Cambodian royal regalia including the Royal Sword Preah Khan Reach, a sculpted image of Shiva and a sculpted image of Vishnu. Ang Duong sent Bakus or Cambodian Hindu Brahmins to ceremoniously receive the royal regalia. After receiving the Cambodian royalty and the royal regalia, Chaophraya Bodindecha sent Nguyễn Bá Hựu and the forty-four Vietnamese to Võ Văn Giải at Phnom Penh in exchange. Scattered among pro-Siamese and pro-Vietnamese factions since 1812, the Cambodian royalty were finally reunited into one single entity. Võ Văn Giải ordered the dismantle of the Vietnamese fortifications in Phnom Penh. Võ Văn Giải also asked Thiệu Trị for the dismantled construction material to be given to Ang Duong, which Thiệu Trị agreed. The Vietnamese eventually retreated from Phnom Penh on 25 May 1847, ending a nearly-two-year Vietnamese occupation of Phnom Penh, Ba Phnum and Southeastern Cambodia, which begun with the Vietnamese offensives into Cambodia in July 1845. Ang Duong took the wood and bricks received from the Vietnamese to renovate many Buddhist temples in Oudong including Vat Veang Chas, Vat Preah Put Nipean, Vat Vihear Samnor and Vat Krang Bonley.

As the Vietnamese had retreated from Cambodia, the Vietnamese commanders Võ Văn Giải, Nguyễn Văn Chương, Lê Văn Phú and Nguyễn Văn Hoàng went to visit the Emperor at Huế, leaving Doãn Uẩn in Châu Đốc. Vietnamese imperial court decided that King Ang Duong of Cambodia should send tributes to Huế triennially, every three years. The Vietnamese also imposed a Confucian-style restriction on the Cambodians, commanding that the Cambodian mission bringing tributes should stop at Châu Đốc in Southern Vietnam to present tributes, not going to Huế. The Vietnamese commanders from Cambodia arrived in Huế, where they were greeted with a celebratory reception. Emperor Thiệu Trị held a banquet for the commanders to celebrate their 'victory' and personally poured wine to the commanders Võ Văn Giải, Nguyễn Văn Chương and Lê Văn Phú with his own hands. Võ Văn Giải and Nguyễn Văn Chương became meritorious subjects and were given high positions in Huế imperial court, while Doãn Uẩn at Châu Đốc was appointed as the new Tổng đốc An Hà or governor of An Giang and Hà Tiên provinces, also responsible for the Cambodian affairs. In October 1847, as the Emperor Thiệu Trị was falling ill, Võ Văn Giải and Nguyễn Văn Chương were two of the four ministers whom Thiệu Trị summoned on his deathbed to enthrone his second son Prince Nguyễn Phúc Hồng Nhậm. The Vietnamese Emperor Thiệu Trị died on 4 November 1847 at the age of 40, succeeded by his 18-year-old son Nguyễn Phúc Hồng Nhậm as the new emperor Tự Đức. Ang Duong sent delegates to partake in the funeral of the late emperor Thiệu Trị.

=== Siamese enthronement of Ang Duong ===
Even though Ang Duong professed himself to be a vassal of both Siam and Vietnam, it was Siam who exerted influence over Ang Duong. Ang Duong had been living in Bangkok for twenty years before being propelled to become the Siam-endorsed candidate. Even though the Vietnamese imperial court had invested both Ang Duong and Ang Mey to be co-rulers, neither Ang Duong's court nor the Siamese agreed. Ang Mey had been a complete stranger to Siam. Cambodian and Thai chronicles did not even mention this 'second enthronement' of Ang Mey under Vietnamese auspices altogether. Like the preceding period of Vietnamese rule, Ang Mey also ended up not having any real powers this time.

When the Vietnamese completed the investiture of Ang Duong as King of Cambodia, Chaophraya Bodindecha the Siamese supreme commander in Cambodia considered this war to be over. Ever since the latest Siamese advance into Cambodia in 1845, the Siamese had been suffering from rice shortage and starvation. As Bodindecha could not keep his forces any longer, he discharged about the half of his forces, 7,238 Lao–Siamese men, to return to their hometowns including Roi-et, Suwannaphum, Khukhan, Sisaket, Khemmarat, Nakhon Ratchasima and Prachinburi, leaving the remaining 6,462 men, who were mostly the Khmers from the Siam-controlled Battambang, to stay in Oudong and Pursat. Chaophraya Bodindecha also sent Oknha Reachdechea Nong and Oknha Thonea Thuppedey Ros, Ang Duong's envoys to Huế, along with Thiệu Trị's investiture edict for Ang Duong and the Thai-translated version, to Bangkok to report Ang Duong's diplomatic mission to Huế to the Siamese king Rama III or King Nangklao. The Siamese king then issued an order on 16 June 1847, allowing Chaophraya Bodindecha to handle the Cambodian affairs per Bodindecha's judgements and allowing Bodindecha to withdraw Siamese troops from Cambodia to return when the matters had been settled;

Ever since the reign of Thiao Tri (Thiệu Trị), which has been seven years for now, His Majesty only listened to the letters of Vietnamese commanders corresponding with Chaophraya Bodindecha and saw that [Thiệu Trị] was bad-mouthed like the previous [Vietnamese rulers]. His Majesty has just only learned of the writing style of King Thiao Tri, which is filled with strong words but also with cowardice, unlike the writing styles of King Minmang (Minh Mạng) and King Yalong (Gia Long). As His Majesty considers the affairs of Cambodia, he understands that the Vietnamese sentiment is in the same manner as it has been, not easily aligned with his prediction. His Majesty has thought wrong. Chaophya Bodindecha is right and has strived to achieve the desired goal. Owing to the Techa (Power) and the Pāramī (Quality) of His Majesty that allowed His Majesty to maintain and uphold the Holy Buddha Religion in Cambodia, the [Vietnamese] amicable gesture should be accepted and should be tightly secured. However, the Vietnamese had seized our Cambodia in the Year of Monkey (1812) and, after thirty-six has passed, only be returned to us on Thursday, sixth waxing of the seventh month (June 20) of the Year of Goat (1847). And Chaophya Bodindecha has gone out to endure hardships in order to retrieve Cambodia since the Year of Snake (1833), as long as fifteen years. It can be compared to swimming in the middle of the great ocean, not seeing any islands nor shores, only clinging onto a small log as an anchor to stay afloat to swim towards the shore. Chaophya Bodindecha, this is your time, you should hurriedly swim ashore. You should plan to the end, so that Cambodia will be stable and peaceful for a long time, not turning bad in a short time like the ancient proverbs; the bottom of the pot does not have time to char, the smoke of the fire does not have time to extinguish, it will be troublesome, the populace will continue to suffer. It should not be like that. Chaophya Bodindecha should carefully plan. And the matter of King Thiao Tri stooping to invest Phra Ong Duang (Ang Duong) as King of Cambodia, making Cambodia a vassal relying on Vietnam, granting gifts to Phra Ong Duang, flattering to a great extent in order to make a reputation, His Majesty has been informed. His Majesty and the King of Vietnam will have to continue to auction [over Cambodia].

King Nangklao considered that Siam had lost Cambodia to Vietnam in 1812, when the Cambodian king Ang Chan brought Vietnamese forces into Cambodia against the advancing Siamese troops and that Siam had retrieved Cambodia into Siamese control on 20 June 1847, the day that Ang Mey and the remaining Cambodian royalty from Phnom Penh came to join with Ang Duong in Oudong. After this, Chaophraya Bodindecha and his remaining forces continued to stay in Cambodia for one year in order to finalize Ang Duong's enthronement. The Siamese king Nangklao had Siamese Hindu Brahmins perform a ceremony to inscribe the regnal name of Ang Duong on the Suvarṇapaṭṭa or gold plate. On 17 January 1848, King Nangklao assigned Phraya Phetphichai (formerly known as Phraya Ratchanikun, who had earlier led Siamese troops to attack Kampong Thom in late 1840) as the royal delegate to bring the Suvarṇapaṭṭa gold plate inscribed with Ang Duong's regnal name, along with some Siamese Brahmins, from Bangkok to Cambodia in order to perform the Rajabhisekha or Enthronement ceremony for Ang Duong in traditional Indic Hindu rituals. Phraya Phetphichai brought the gold plate on land to Battambang, where he continued his journey on water, arriving in the Kampong Luong pier of Oudong in March 1848.

On 7 March 1848, Chaophraya Bodindecha and Phraya Phetphichai the Siamese representatives presided over the Rajabhisekha or Enthronement ceremony of Ang Duong as the King of Cambodia in Indic-Brahmanistic tradition. Ang Duong, aged 52, was officially enthroned with the regnal name Preahbat Samdech Preah Harireak Reamea Issathipadei Srey Soriyopear (Khmer: ព្រះបាទសម្ដេចព្រះហរិរក្សរាមាឥស្សាធិបតីស្រីសុរិយោពណ៌, Thai: สมเด็จพระหริรักษ์รามาธิบดีศรีสุริโยพรรณ). The ceremony was conducted by both Khmer and Siamese Brahmins. Chaophraya Bodindecha had been staying in Cambodia for about two years since July 1845 during the latest Vietnamese invasion into Cambodia. After the ceremony, Bodindecha, along with his remaining forces, left Cambodia in April 1848. Bodindecha left his son Phra Phromborirak in Cambodia to later accompany Ang Duong's son to Bangkok. This was Bodindecha's last departure from Cambodia. On his return journey, Bodindecha met with his old colleague Chaophraya Phrakhlang Dit Bunnag (who, together with Bodindecha, led Siamese fleet to invade Southern Vietnam in 1834 but were defeated at Vàm Nao) and his son Chamuen Waiworanat Chuang Bunnag (who led Siamese fleet to attack Hà Tiên in 1842), who were on the campaign to suppress a Teochew Chinese insurrection in Chachoengsao. Bodindecha helped the Bunnags to suppress the Chinese insurgents and all of then returned to Bangkok in May 1848.

King Nangklao officially appointed Phra Narinyotha Nong, who had been acting as the governor of Battambang since 1843, as Phraya Aphaiphubet Nong the governor of Battambang. To demonstrate his loyalty to Siam, King Ang Duong had to send his sons to Bangkok to be 'educated' under Siamese influence as virtual political hostages. In June 1848, Phra Phromborirak (Bodindecha's son) brought two Cambodian princes; the 15-year-old Prince Ang Reacheavodey (eldest son of Ang Duong, who later became King Norodom) and the 25-year-old Prince Ang Phim (son of the deceased Prince Ang Em, older brother of Ang Duong) the nephew of Ang Duong, to Bangkok, where they 'served' the Siamese monarch. King Nangklao had the two Cambodian princes reside at the Wang Chao Khamen or Cambodian Palace quarters in modern Ban Bat, Pomprap Sattruphai district of Bangkok, which had been the residence of the Cambodian royalty in Siam since 1792. Also in 1848, King Ang Duong sent envoys Oknha Chakrey Meas and Oknha Kralahom Mouk to bring the tributes of fifty pieces of silk, two hundred pieces of white cloth, one hap (picul) of cardamoms, one picul of bastard cardamoms, one picul of gamboge, one picul of lac, one picul of beeswax and fifty pots of liquid lacquer to present to the Siamese king at Bangkok. In this mission, Ang Duong asked King Nangklao to appoint the two highest ministerial positions of Cambodia; the Chauvea Tolaha (Prime Minister) and the Samdech Chauponhea (Deputy Prime Minister). The Siamese king then appointed;

- The senile 66-year-old Phraya Phichai Narong Rueangrit, a Khmer official from the Siam-controlled Battambang, with personal name Ma, as Chauvea Tolaha or Prime Minister of Cambodia, becoming Chauvea Tolaha Ma. This Chauvea Tolaha Ma had earlier served Siam in the Battambang government and was a relative of Neak Moneang Pen, a consort of Ang Duong and the mother of the Prince Reacheavodey (Norodom). Chauvea Tolaha Ma would be the Prime Minister of Cambodia under Ang Duong until his death in 1855.
- Oknha Surkealok Kas the former Sdach Tranh governor of Pursat, who rebelled against the pro-Vietnamese King Ang Chan in 1832, fled to Bangkok and later became Bodindecha's agent in Cambodia, as Samdech Chauponhea or Deputy Prime Minister, becoming Samdech Chauponhea Kas.

Chaophraya Bodindecha had been the Siamese supreme military commander in Cambodia for fifteen years from 1833 to 1848. All began in late 1833 when Bodindecha led the Siamese armies to invade Cambodia, going as far as Southern Vietnam but was repelled by the Vietnamese at Vàm Nao. After this initial defeat, Bodindecha stayed in Battambang in the Siam-annexed Northwestern Cambodia to support the Cambodian princes Ang Em and Ang Duong as the Siam-supported claimants to Cambodian kingship. With defection of Ang Em to Vietnam in 1839 and the general Cambodian uprising against Vietnamese rule in 1840, Chaophraya Bodindecha led the Siamese forces to invade Cambodia for the second time in 1840, leading to the collapse of Vietnamese rule and establishment of Siamese domination in Cambodia. Bodindecha also brought Ang Duong from Bangkok in 1841 to place as the Siam-endorsed candidate onto the Cambodian throne. Bodindecha briefly returned to Bangkok in 1845 but the renewed Vietnamese offensives onto Cambodia prompted Bodindecha to bring troops to Cambodia again in the same year. As the Siamese–Vietnamese peace agreement had been achieved and Ang Duong had been enthroned as the King of Cambodia, fulfilling his mission, Bodindecha left Cambodia in April 1848 in his eventual departure and returned to Bangkok in May. Chaophraya Bodindecha stayed in Bangkok for one year until June 1849, when there was a cholera epidemic in Bangkok. Bodindecha died from cholera on 24 June 1849 at the age of 73.

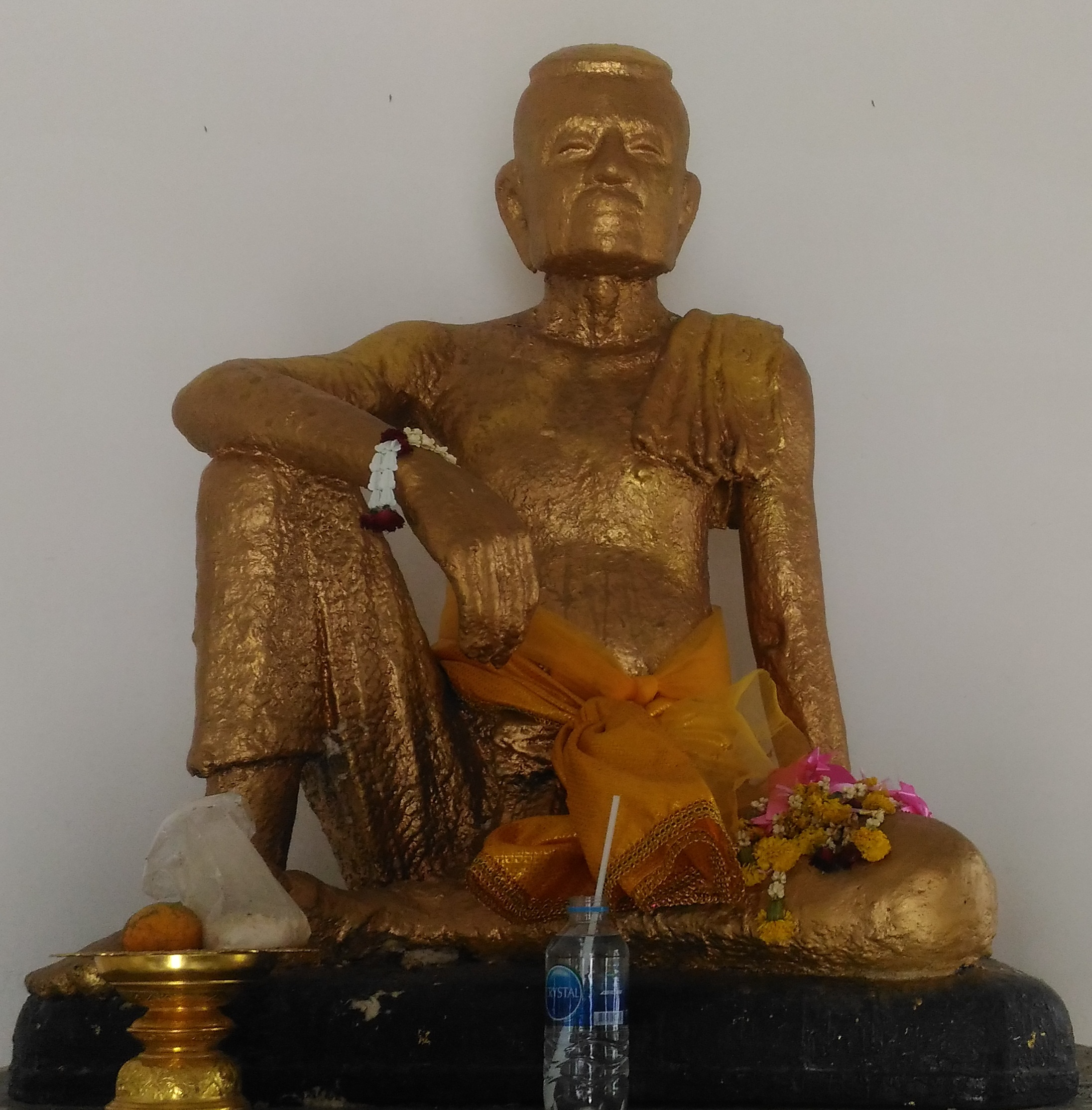
Statue of Chaophraya Bodindecha at Wat Chakkrawat temple in Bangkok, built in 1898, is said to be a replica of the original statue depicting Bodindecha built by King Ang Duong of Cambodia in Oudong.

Upon the death of Chaophraya Bodindecha, King Harireak Reamea Ang Duong built a Chinese-style pavilion in Oudong and a statue of Bodindecha placed in that pavilion, where Ang Duong reportedly performed Paṃsukūla Buddhist memorial services for Bodindecha yearly. This statue of Bodindecha in Oudong survived at least into the 1890s when the abbot of Wat Chakkrawat temple in Bangkok (the temple that Bodindecha had sponsored) sent someone to copy the model of the Bodindecha's statue in Oudong in order to cast another statue of Bodindecha at Wat Chakkrawat temple. The statue of Bodindecha at the temple was completed in 1898.

== Aftermath ==
Later, in 1858, a Vietnamese ship along with twenty one crew was blown off course and landed in Bangkok. The Siamese court under King Mongkut then arranged the Vietnamese crew to board a Chinese ship to return to Saigon. Nguyễn Tri Phương, who was then the superintendent of six provinces in Cochinchina, sent a formal letter to Chao Phraya Sri Suriyawongse asking for the return of Vietnamese captives from the war ten years earlier. Sri Suriyawongse replied that those Vietnamese were already settled down in Siam and he instead returned the seized muskets and ammunition to Nguyễn Tri Phương.

When King Ang Duong of Cambodia died in 1860, a succession dispute arose between his three sons: Norodom, Sisowath and Si Votha, leading to a civil war in Cambodia in 1861. King Mongkut then sent Siamese officials to placate the Cambodian succession dispute, reaffirming Siamese influence over Cambodia until the formation of French protectorate of Cambodia in 1863. The Vietnamese, being engaged in the war with the French, did not intervene.

== See also ==
- Siamese–Vietnamese War (1831–1834)
- Cambodian rebellion (1840)
