= Kampuchea Krom =

Region in Southeast Indochina

Kampuchea Krom (Khmer: កម្ពុជាក្រោម, Kâmpŭchéa Kraôm [kampuciə kraom]; "Lower Cambodia") is a region variously known by terms such as Southern Vietnam, Nam Kỳ, and the former French Cochinchina. Bordering present-day Cambodia, the region is positioned in Cambodian irredentist narratives as a "once-integral part of the Khmer Kingdom that was colonised by France as Cochinchina in the mid-nineteenth century and then ceded to Vietnam in June 1949".

Kampuchea Krom continues to be home to many ethnic Khmer Krom, with some Khmer estimating their numbers to be between seven million and over ten million, despite the government's census of the population of Khmer Krom in Vietnam at 1.32 million by 2019. While the Khmer term "Kampuchea Krom" can be translated as "Lower Cambodia", an alternative name for the region is "Kampuchea Lech Tuek" (កម្ពុជាលិចទឹក Kâmpŭchéa Lĭch Tœ̆k [kampuciə lɨc tɨk]), which roughly corresponds to "Flooded Cambodia".

== Territorial history ==
Kampuchea Krom or Nam Bộ (light green).

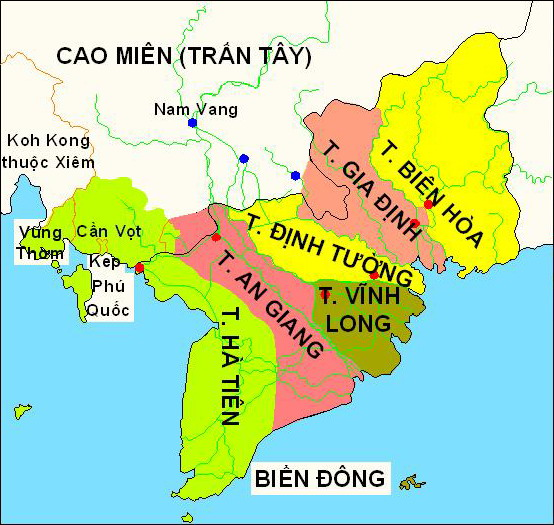
Six Provinces of Nam Bộ during the Nguyễn dynasty before 1841

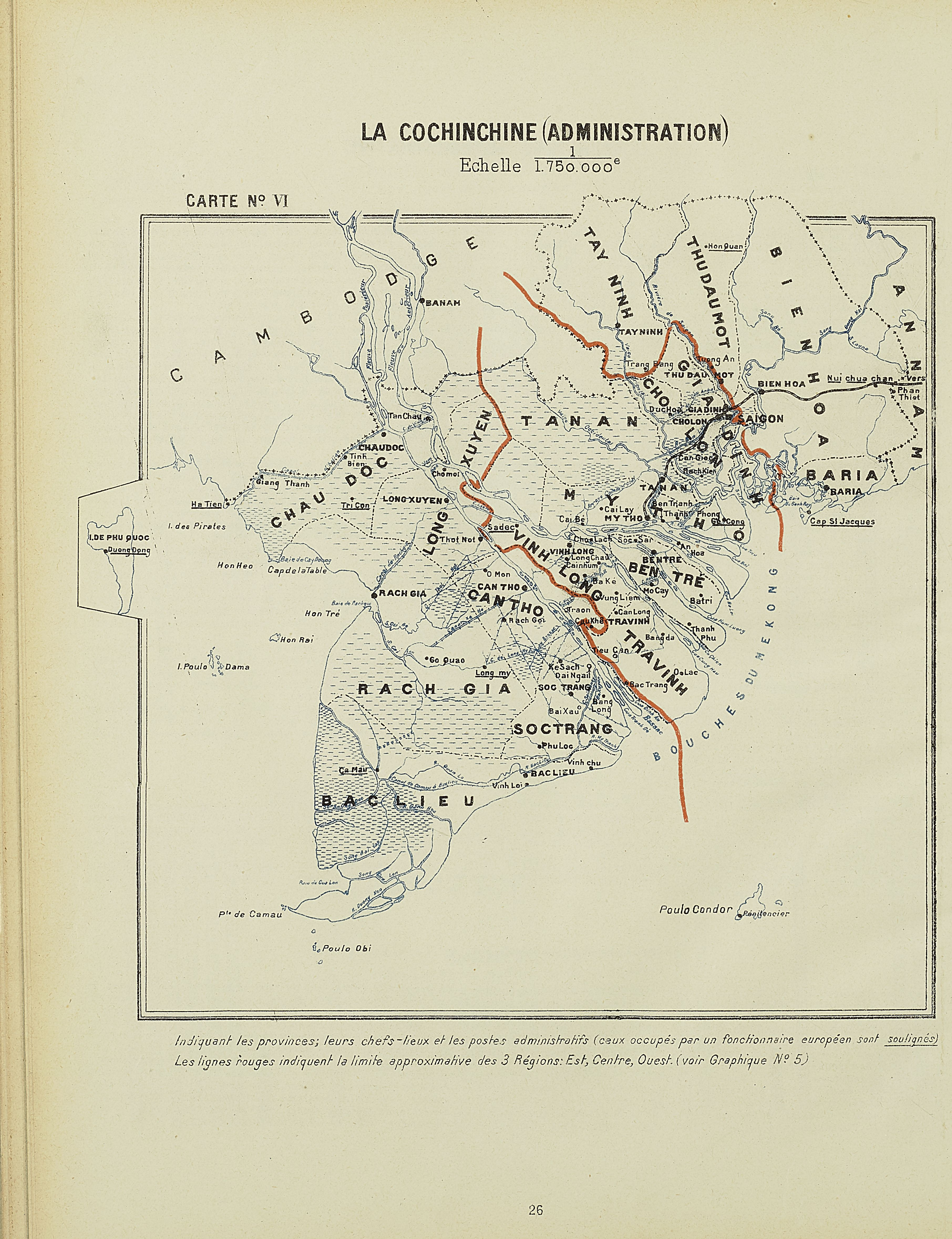
Map of Cochinchina after France ceded some lands to Cambodia

In a Khmer Buddhist cosmology, the Khmer were said to have inhabited the land of Kampuchea Krom "since it first emerged from the ocean thousands of years ago as a fragrant and glowing land that attracted the teovada, celestial beings who ate the sweet earth and were subsequently unable to fly back to their world, thus staying on earth as the first humans". Throughout history, the area known in Khmer as Kampuchea Krom has been situated within numerous ancient polities, including Nokor Phnom (Funan), Chenla, and the Khmer Empire.

=== Ancient civilizations ===
Archaeological research at the Óc Eo site between Rạch Giá and Long Xuyên in present South Vietnam dates Vietnamese incursion in the region to the sixteenth century, prior to which the area was located within the ancient Khmer empire. There is no clear consensus on the ethnic makeup of those living within the region during the earlier Funan and Chenla polities. Linguistic evidence from the period - by way of inscriptions - supports the theory that inhabitants spoke a pre-Khmer Austronesian language. However, archaeologists and historians also contend that this language may have been similar to Khmer, and that a version of Old Khmer may have been used by the end of the Funan period. A further theory is that ethnic distribution within the region may have varied with elevation within the landscape, with Khmer speakers living on higher ground, and Malayo-Polynesian - and later Vietnamese - speakers occupying the lower-lying areas.

=== 17th–19th-century Vietnamese expansion ===
The period spanning the seventeenth to nineteenth centuries saw an unprecedented expansion of the Vietnamese state into Kampuchea Krom. Historian Barbara Andaya identifies Vietnamese internal feuding and the Trịnh–Nguyễn Civil War of the early seventeenth century as motivating the dispersal of the Vietnamese population into Khmer speaking areas. In particular, Khmer sources note that Vietnamese immigrants flooded into the regions of Prey Nokor (known as the present-day Ho Chi Minh City), Baria, and Daun Nay (Kampong Sroka Trei), following requests by Vietnamese missionaries to King Chey Chettha (1618–1628).

Following the fall of the Ming dynasty in the mid-seventeenth century, Ming loyalists began to migrate across East and Southeast Asia, including towards Kampuchea Krom. Historian Claudine Ang argues that this migration of Ming loyalists into the Mekong delta, or Kampuchea Krom, and their alliance with the southern Vietnamese rather than the Khmer or the Siamese, "gave the Nguyễn lords of the southern Vietnamese state the support that they needed to lay claims on the delta lands", enabling the aggressive southward territorial expansion of the Nguyễn lords in the mid-eighteenth century.

However, it was only after the 1809 death of Mạc Tử Thiêm, whose father Mạc Cửu had arrived in Kampuchea Krom after leaving China following the fall of the Ming dynasty, that the Vietnamese state incorporated the Hà Tiên principality into Vietnamese administrative control. Prior to Mạc Tử Thiêm's death, Hà Tiên had been an autonomous principality. Through the incorporation of Hà Tiên, the Nguyễn dynasty thus further extended their borders amidst a period of tense regional competition involving the Siamese, Vietnamese, and Khmer.

This period of unprecedented southward territorial expansion was cited by the Gia Long emperor to the Qing court in its request for the Vietnamese state to be recognized by the term Nan Yue rather than Annan, a request that ultimately resulted in its current name of Yue Nan, or Vietnam. (See: Mekong Delta - History, Vietnamese Period)

Historian David Chandler argues that further long-term effects of Vietnamese southward territorial expansion into Kampucha Krom included: (1) Cambodia being "cut off to a large extent from maritime access to the outside world"; (2) the removal of "large portions of territory and tens of thousands of ethnic Khmer from Cambodian jurisdiction"; and (3) the placement of Cambodia in a vise between its two powerful neighbors of Siam and Vietnam.

== Environment and infrastructure ==
As implied by its alternate name of Kampuchea Lik Tuk, or "Flooded Cambodia", Kampuchea Krom sees an abundance of water, with events like high flooding, high rainfall, and seawater incursions varying with the seasons. The abundance of water brought by these events, together with the natural flat plain that characterizes its region, makes Kampuchea Krom a productive agricultural area with rich, fertile soils. However, its swampy and amphibious nature, accompanied by seasonal dry spells, have resulted in researchers' characterization of the region as resistant to human settlement, with significant infrastructural development required to make permanent settlement possible.

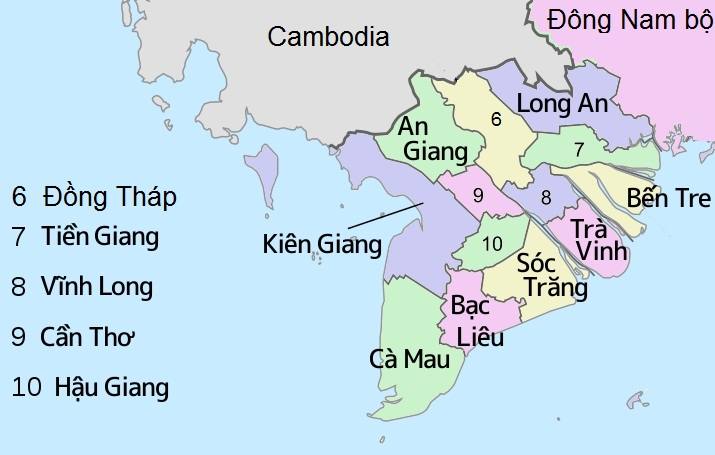
Vietnamese Administrative Map of the Lower Mekong Delta; The northern coastal complex identified by Taylor corresponds to the provinces of Vĩnh Long and Trà Vinh, as depicted on the map.

=== Phno ===
Anthropologist Philip Taylor's ethnographic text on Khmer communities within Kampuchea Krom identifies a number of strategies employed by the Khmer to utilize local precipitation for the purposes of agriculture and consumption, even during the dry season. These strategies differ across its geomorphically distinct sub-regions. One key strategy is that of harvesting fresh rain water stored within the phno, a strategy that is particularly prominent within the northern coastal complex.

The northern coastal complex is a "flange of flat, salt-impregnated land lying between the mouths of the Mekong and Bassac Rivers and bounded by the ocean to the east", an area often perceived as the "quintessential Khmer region of Vietnam" by researchers and tourists alike. The region sees annual wet and dry seasons. Its rainy season lasts from May to December and covers the majority of the region with water. During the dry season however, soil surfaces crack and drinking water becomes extremely scarce.

Taylor identifies the phno, or "elevated ridges of coarse sandy soil, between one to five metres high", as crucial to the sustenance of life within the northern coastal complex, constituting both cosmological and strategic significance for the Khmers in the region. According to Taylor's interlocuter, a Pali teacher in the region, the phno were the first land to emerge, and comprised the ancient lands of Suvannaphum through which the Buddha traversed during his travels across the world.

According to the Abbot of Wat Knong Srok, Buddhist Khmer thought further explains the stratification of the world and its elements, where humans live upon the land, water supports the land, and water rests on air, otherwise expressed in Khmer as:

Kyol tro tuk [air supports water]

Tuk tro dei [water supports land]

Dei tro munnous [land supports people]

Alongside this cosmological explanation of the elements, Taylor cites people at the Tra Vinh museum of Khmer culture and other locals to suggest that it is the height of the phno, and the numerousness of the phno in the region, that has made the northern coastal dune complex habitable, and one of the oldest inhabited places in Kampuchea Krom. Further, though groundwater in the region is salinated throughout the year, the absorption and retention of fresh rain water by the sand dunes during the rainy months creates natural freshwater reservoirs for residents. The less dense freshwater remains above the denser saline groundwater without mingling, both of which lie at a shallow depth beneath apparently dry land and accessible with some digging.

=== Irrigation ===
Numerous irrigation projects have been undertaken in Kampuchea Krom, including by the French during the colonial period of the mid-twentieth century, and by the Vietnamese, following their significant expansion into the region in the nineteenth century and the post-war period of the late twentieth century. Environmental historian David Biggs argues that these irrigation projects have often reflected states' desires to incorporate the region into their nation-building projects. The construction of such irrigation infrastructure has also been the source of a number of Khmer-led rebellions within the region (see: Vĩnh Tế Canal).

==== Improvements to crop yield ====
Researchers assessing changes in agricultural production within the region often assess that the infrastructural development of such irrigation projects have been a success, citing statistics like the doubling of rice production in the delta between 1980 and 1995, following the digging of canals and raising of dykes. Kono Yasuyuki argues that the moderation of the "hydrological environment by infrastructure improvement is essential for agricultural intensification and diversification in the deltas", and for the "production of a substantial surplus of rice and its export".

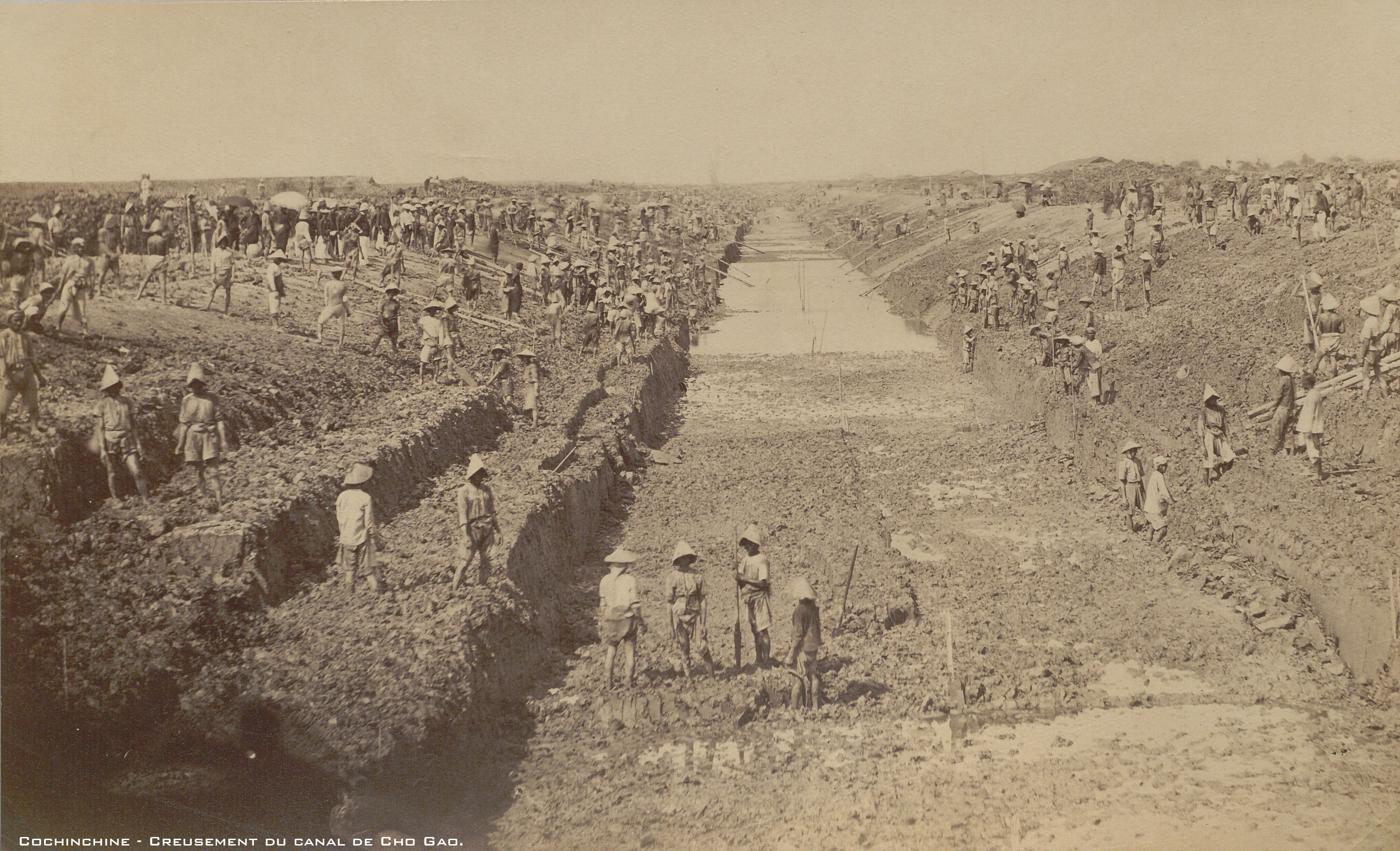
Photograph taken by Emile Gsell of the early stages of the Cho Gao Canal Project

==== Critiques of irrigation efforts ====
The Chợ Gạo Canal was built by the Colonial Department of Public Works to connect Saigon (now Ho Chi Minh City) to the nearest delta port. Biggs draws from records from the Maritime and Colonial Review to argue that the Chợ Gạo Canal, despite opening to great success and fanfare in 1877, quickly became unnavigable within the short span of several months. The flatness of the delta, and the tides of the sea had resulted in the formation of bars of silt that choked off all but one of the canal's waterways.

Drawing on a later example in the mid-1980s, Taylor examines the impact of irrigation and infrastructural development in the saltwater river region of Kampuchea Krom. The intensification of canal digging and dyke construction during the post-war period turned "nearly the entire saltwater rivers region [into] a freshwater zone", making fresh water conveniently available to Khmer residents in the region for the first time. New high yield rice varieties were made simultaneously available to the Khmer. However, due to the new rice varieties' dependence on pesticides, canals, rivers, and ponds in the area had been contaminated. By the mid-1990s, Taylor argues that the Khmer "faced conditions of water scarcity even more dire than in the pre-canal period", with no safe water sources.

=== Biodiversity ===
The delta region of Kampuchea Krom supports a diverse biota, including two mammals of conservation significance, the Hairy-nosed Otter and the Dugong. A further at least 37 species of birds, and 470 species of fish of conservation significance have been recorded.

However, the high use of fertilisers and pesticides to support the intensification of agriculture in the region, has resulted in nutrient and pesticide runoff, endangering aquatic biodiversity in the region. Khmer farmers affiliated to Wat Bei Chhau observe that local fish stocks have declined, attributing the decline to high-yield rice varieties' need for pesticides and comparing the new rice varieties with seasonal rice grown in the past that required no pesticides, and did not kill the fish.

Continued human activities within the region, including overfishing, and the construction of dams and other irrigation efforts are expected to have further ill effects on the biodiversity of the region. These effects include the blocking of fish migration pathways, and the trapping of nutrient and sediment, resulting in erosion and the loss of arable land.

Climate change and rising sea levels in the long term are expected to result in a significant loss of land in the region, as well as the loss of coastal habitats as brackish water becomes saline and freshwater areas become brackish or saline.

Taylor suggests that these instances of environmental decline and changes in biodiversity have convinced many Khmers in the region of the imminence of an apocalypse (pleung ka). As shared by the Khmer Buddhist monk, the apocalypse will come in the form of fire, floods and winds that consume the earthly realm, with only the most virtuous followers of the Buddha's message escaping and achieving rebirth in the celestial realm as teovada. Taylor takes the Khmers' interpretation of environmental and ecological change in the region to reflect the hold of monastic institutions within Kampuchea Krom, and the appeal of Buddhist pathways to salvation.

== Areas ==
Kampuchea Krom was originally divided into only four provinces Don Nai, Long Haor, Moat Chruk, and Peam. According to Cambodian sources, it now covers approximately the areas of twenty-one Vietnamese districts.

According to Cambodian sources, the Khmer names of the local divisions have been continually renamed by Vietnamese authorities. Vietnamese names are seen as a calque of the original Khmer names such as Sa Đéc (Khmer: Phsar Dek), Sóc Trăng (Khmer: Srok Khleang), Trà Vinh (Khmer: Preah Trapeang), Bạc Liêu (Khmer: Pol Leav), Cà Mau (Khmer: Toek Khmau), Mỹ Tho (Khmer: Me Sar); Đồng Nai (Khmer: Don Nai). Some Vietnamese names were translated from the meaning of the original Khmer names such as Bến Tre (Khmer: Kampong Roessei), Bến Nghé (Khmer: Kampong Krabei).

Areas of Kampuchea Krom
No.	Khmer	Romanization	Vietnamese	Vietnamese Province/City	Inclusion into Vietnam
Provinces/City in the Southeast Region
1	ព្រៃនគរ	Prey Nokor	Gia Định / Saigon (later: Ho Chi Minh City)	Ho Chi Minh City	c.1696; 1699
2	ព្រះសួគ៌ា	Preah Suokea	Bà Rịa	Ho Chi Minh City	c.1651
3	អូរកាប់	Or Kab	Vũng Tàu	Ho Chi Minh City	c.1651
4	ទួលតាមោក (ឈើទាលមួយ)	Tuol Ta Mouk (Chheu Teal Muoy)	Thủ Dầu Một	Ho Chi Minh City & Đồng Nai	c.1696
5	ដូនណៃ/ចង្វាត្រពាំង (កំពង់ស្រកាត្រី)	Don Nai/Changva Trapeang (Kampong Sraka Trei)	Đồng Nai (Biên Hòa)	Đồng Nai	c.1651; 1699
6	រោងដំរី	Rong Damrei	Tây Ninh	Tây Ninh	c.1770
Provinces in Mekong Delta Region
7	មាត់ជ្រូក	Moat Chruk	Châu Đốc	An Giang	c.1715, 1757
8	ពាមបារ៉ាជ្ញ/ពាមបារាជ	Peam Barach	Long Xuyên	An Giang	c.1715, 1731
9	ផ្សារដែក	Phsar Dek	Sa Đéc	Đồng Tháp	c.1757
10	ពោធិ៍លើ (later ពលលាវ)	Pouthi Loeu (later Pol Leav)	Bạc Liêu	Cà Mau	c.1840
11	ទឹកខ្មៅ	Toek Khmau	Cà Mau	Cà Mau	c. 1707
12	កំពង់ឫស្សី (ផ្សំអំបើស)	Kampong Roessei (Phsam Ambaeus)	Bến Tre	Vĩnh Long	c.1732
13	ព្រែកឫស្សី (កំពូលមាស)	Prek Roessei (Kampul Meas)	Cần Thơ	Cần Thơ	c.1758
14	ក្រមួនស (រាជា)	Kramuon Sa (Reachea)	Rạch Giá	An Giang	c. 1707; 1715, 1757, 1758
15	ពាម (បន្ទាយមាស)	Peam (Banteay Meas)	Hà Tiên	An Giang	c. 1707, 1715
16	ឈ្មោះថ្មី (កំពង់គោ)	Chhmuoh Thmei (Kampong Kou)	Tân An	Tây Ninh	c.1669
17	ស្រុកឃ្លាំង(បាសាក់)	Srok Khleang (Bassac)	Sóc Trăng	Cần Thơ	c. 1758
18	មេស	Me Sa	Mỹ Tho	Đồng Tháp	c.1731; 1732
19	កោះគង (ដំបកកោង)	Koh Korng (Dambok Kaong)	Gò Công	Đồng Tháp	c.1731
20	ព្រះត្រពាំង	Preah Trapeang	Trà Vinh	Vĩnh Long	c.1731; 1758
21	លង់ហោរ	Long Haor	Vĩnh Long	Vĩnh Long	c.1731; 1732
Major Islands
1	កោះត្រល់	Koh Tral	Phú Quốc	An Giang	c.1700; 1939
2	កោះត្រឡាច	Koh Tralach	Côn Đảo	Ho Chi Minh City	c.1765
Port
1	កំពង់ក្របី	Kampong Krabei	Bến Nghé	Ho Chi Minh City	
Other
1	អូរកែវ	Or Keo	Óc Eo		
2	ប្រាសាទប្រាំល្វែង	Prasat Pram Lveng	Tháp Mười		

== See also ==
- Khmer Krom
- History of Cambodia
- Funan
- Chenla
- Khmer Empire
- Six Provinces of Southern Vietnam
