= Hà Tiên province =

Historic province of Vietnam

Hà Tiên Tỉnh Hà Tiên
- Province
- Interactive map of Hà Tiên
- Country: Nguyễn dynasty French Indochina; South Vietnam
- City: Hà Tiên
- Established: 1832
- Dissolved: 1956

Hà Tiên (Vietnamese: tỉnh Hà Tiên; chữ Hán: 河僊) was a province of Vietnam, originally formed in 1832 under the Nguyễn dynasty, and was finally disestablished in 1956 under the South Vietnam. Its capital was the town of Hà Tiên.

== History ==
=== Under Nguyễn lords ===
In the early 18th century, on the former territory of Chân Lạp, the small market town of Hà Tiên was established by Mạc Cửu (Mok Kiu ), a Ming émigrée, who did not surrender to the newly formed Qing dynasty, but chose migrating to Chân Lạp (Cambodia) instead.

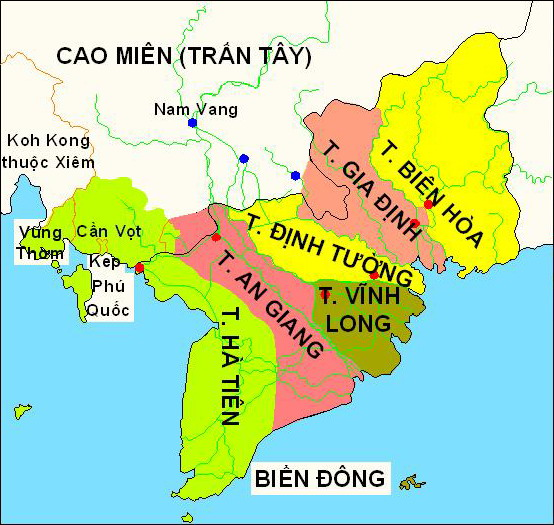
Nam Kỳ Lục tỉnh (1832 – 1841)

Many works incorrectly referred to Hà Tiên as "Panthaimas", confusing Hà Tiên with Banteay Meas. It was variously spelled as Panday-mas (Khmer), Ponteamass (English), Phutthaimat (Thai: พุทไธมาศ) or Banthaimat (Thai: บันทายมาศ), Ponthiamas or Pontheaymas (French), Pontiano (Robert's Map, 1751), Panthai-mas, Bantaimas, Pontiamas, Pontaimas, Bantay-mas, Banteay M’eas, Pontiamas, Pontiamasse, Po-taimat, and infinite other variations.

Mạc Cửu later switched allegiance to the Nguyễn lords of Đại Việt (Vietnam). In 1708, the region became Vietnamese Hà Tiên Protectorate, and Mạc Cửu was appointed as the first governor by Lord Minh.

In 1735, Mạc Cửu died, his eldest son Mạc Thiên Tứ (Mạc Tung) was appointed as the successor by Lord Ninh. In 1757, Thiên Tứ supported Cambodian exiled prince Nặc Tôn (Ang Ton) to crown the new king of Cambodia as Outey II. In return, Nặc Tôn ceded his five prefectures: Hương Úc, Cần Bột, Trực Sâm, Sài Mạt and Linh Quỳnh to Thiên Tứ. Lord Võ accepted these new territories and left them under Hà Tiên administration. Thiên Tứ also established two new districts: Kiên Giang (Rạch Giá), and Long Xuyên (Cà Mau)

In 1773, Siamese king Phi Nhã Tân (Taksin) captured Hà Tiên and appointed Trần Liên as the governor. Thiên Tứ had to fled to Long Hồ palace. In 1773, with the support of general Nguyễn Cửu Đàm forces, Thiên Tứ retook Hà Tiên.

In 1777, the Tây Sơn general Nguyễn Huệ defeated the Nguyễn lords forces, occupied Gia Định, captured then executed Lord Tân Chính and Lord Định, Thiên Tứ fled to Xiêm La (Siam) to seek military aid. Initially, Phi Nhã Tân welcomed Thiên Tứ, but later he suspected Thiên Tứ of plotting to overthrow him. In 1780, Phi Nhã Tân imprisoned Thiên Tứ and his companion Tôn Thất Xuân for interrogation. Thiên Tứ committed suicide in prison while most of the Vietnamese envoys were executed. Only three Thiên Tứ's teenage sons (Tử Sanh, Tử Tuấn, Tử Thiêm) and his four grandsons survived. In 1784, Lord Nguyễn appointed Tử Sanh the governor of Hà Tiên.

=== Under Nguyễn dynasty ===
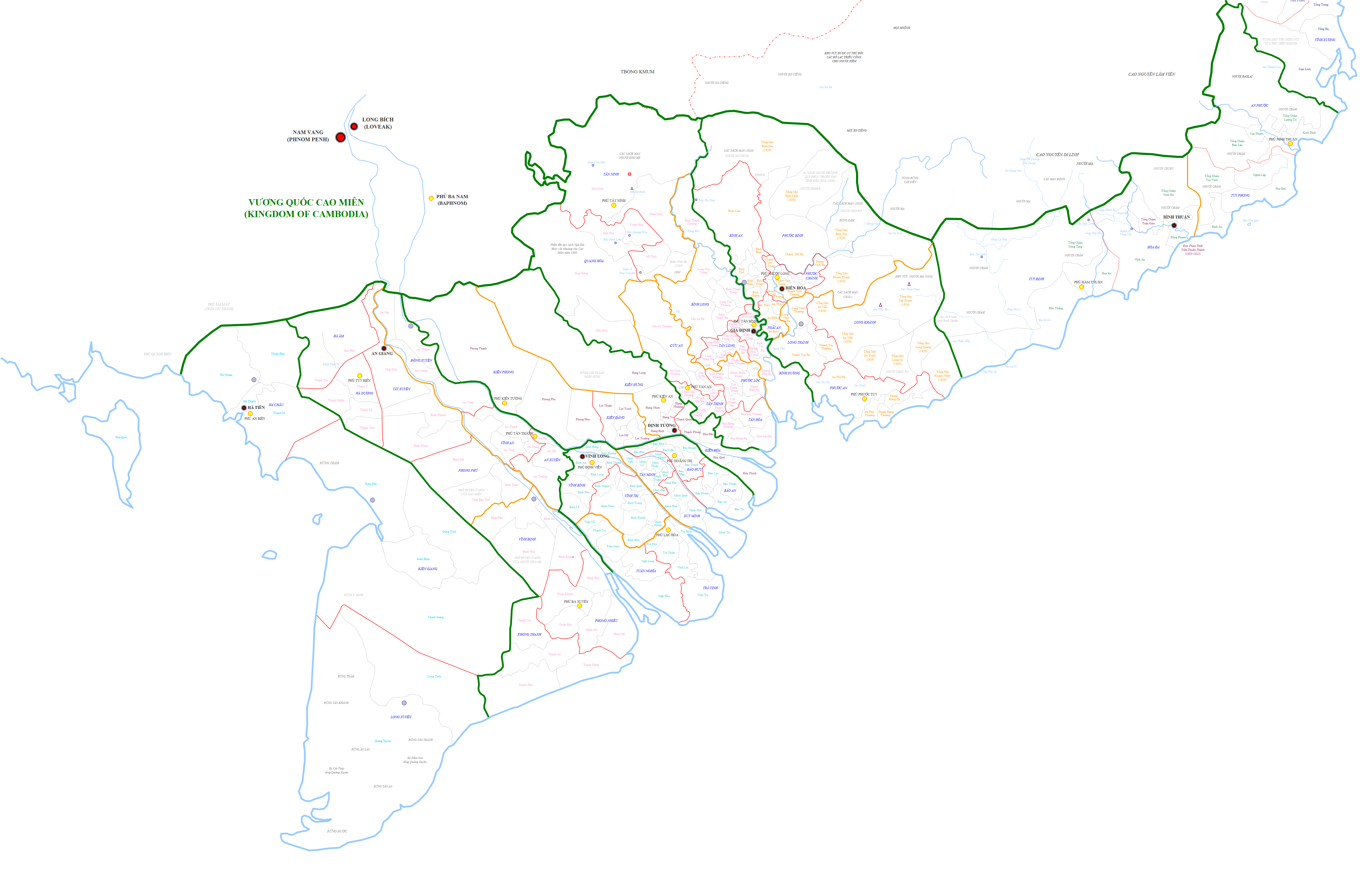
Six Provinces of Lower Cochinchina, and Bình Thuận in 1850

Hà Tiên protectorate was changed to Hà Tiên province when Emperor Minh Mạng divided Lower Cochinchina into Six Provinces in 1832. Hà Tiên province contained one prefecture: Khai Biên, divided into three districts: Hà Châu, Kiên Giang, and Long Xuyên. Lê Đại Cương was appointed the governor-general of An – Hà (An Giang – Hà Tiên) cum viceroy of Chân Lạp. Under Cương administration were: Ngô Bá Nhân – An Giang provincial governor, and Phạm Xuân Bích - Hà Tiên provincial governor, both were appointed shortly before.

After the Cochinchina Campaign it was ceded to the French by the Huế court and later became a part of French Cochinchina. On 1 January 1900, Hà Tiên province was divided into the 3 provinces: Hà Tiên, Rạch Giá, Bạc Liêu. In 1901, Hà Tiên province contained two prefectures (phủ), including An Biên and Quảng Biên.

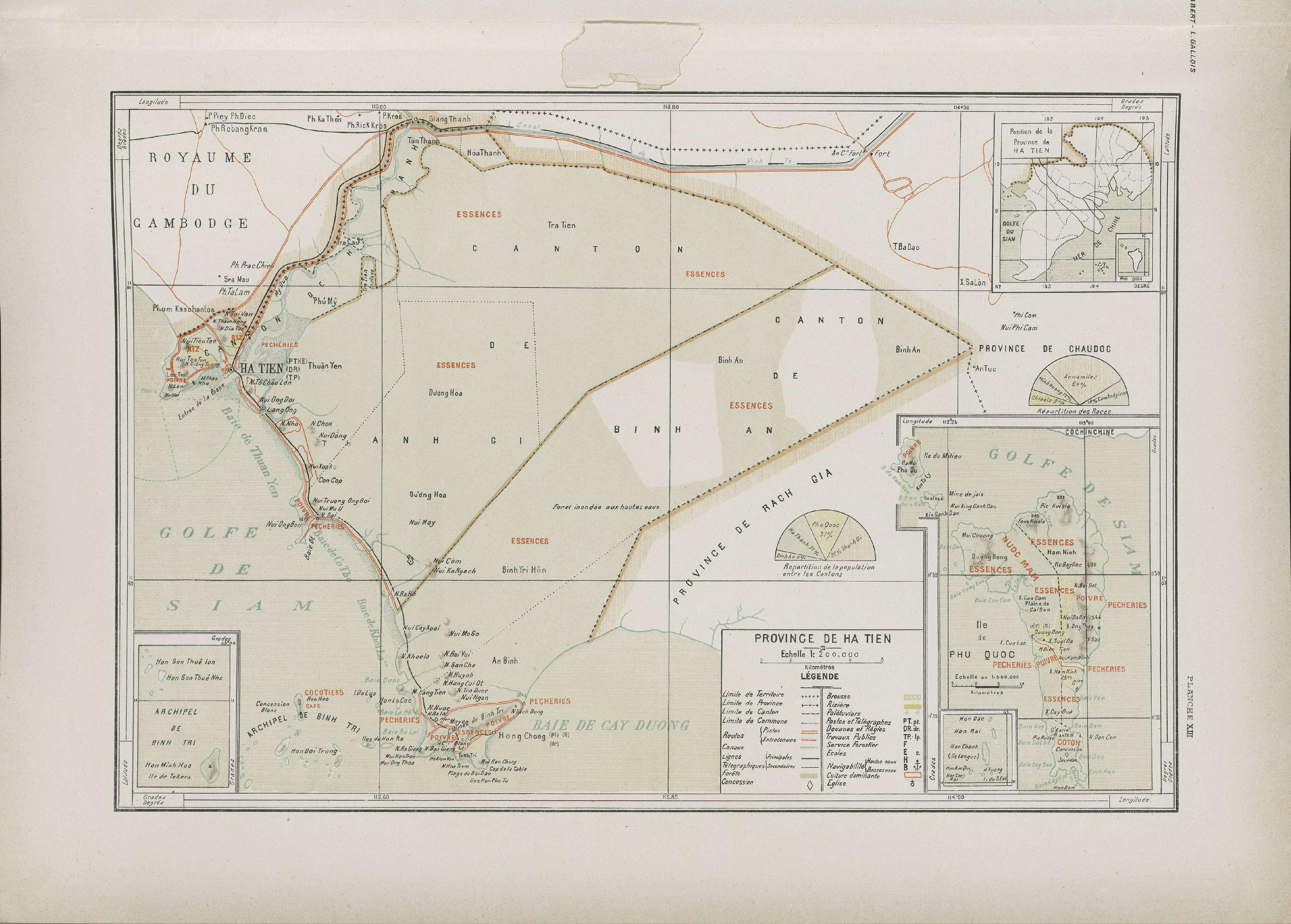
Map of Ha Tien province in 1909

=== After August Revolution ===
In 1950, Hà Tiên province and Long Châu Hậu province were merged into the newly established Long Châu Hà Province. In 1954, Long Châu Hà province was disestablished and divided into three provinces; Hà Tiên, Châu Đốc, Long Xuyên.

On 22 October 1956, Hà Tiên province and Rạch Giá province merged to Kiên Giang province. The former Hà Tiên province was thus divided into two districts; Hà Tiên and Phú Quốc. Both districts were parts of Kiên Giang Province.

== Notable people ==
- Mạc Cửu, the founder and first governor of Hà Tiên.
- Mạc Thiên Tứ, the second governor of Hà Tiên.
- Mạc Tử Sanh, the fourth governor of Hà Tiên.
