= Six Provinces of Southern Vietnam =

Region of Southern Vietnam

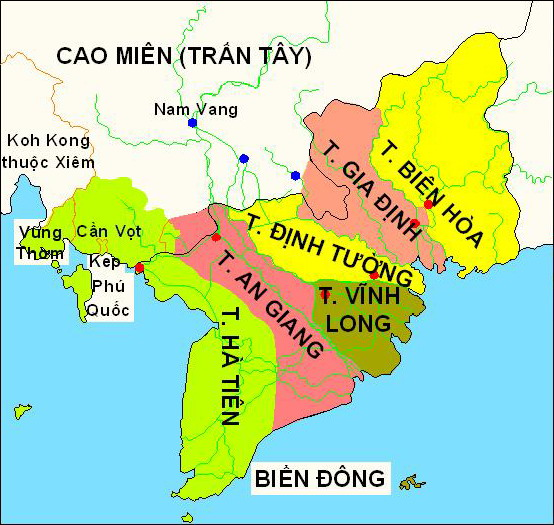
Southern Vietnam during the Nguyễn dynasty before 1841. Cần Vột (Kampot), Vũng Thơm (Kampong Saom) and Svay Rieng (triangular wedge protruding into Vietnam known as the "Parrot's Beak") would later be ceded by French colonials to Cambodia. Cao Mien = Cambodia. Biển Đông = vi: East Sea. Nam Vang = Phnom Penh. Koh Kong was annexed by Siam until being returned to French Cambodia.

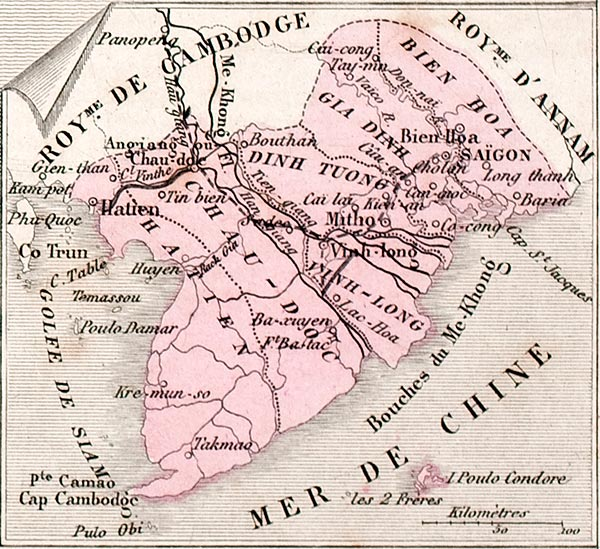
Map of Southern Vietnam in 1883 as part of French Indochina, however following the administrative divisions of the 1832–1862 Nguyễn dynasty's Nam Kỳ Lục Tỉnh.

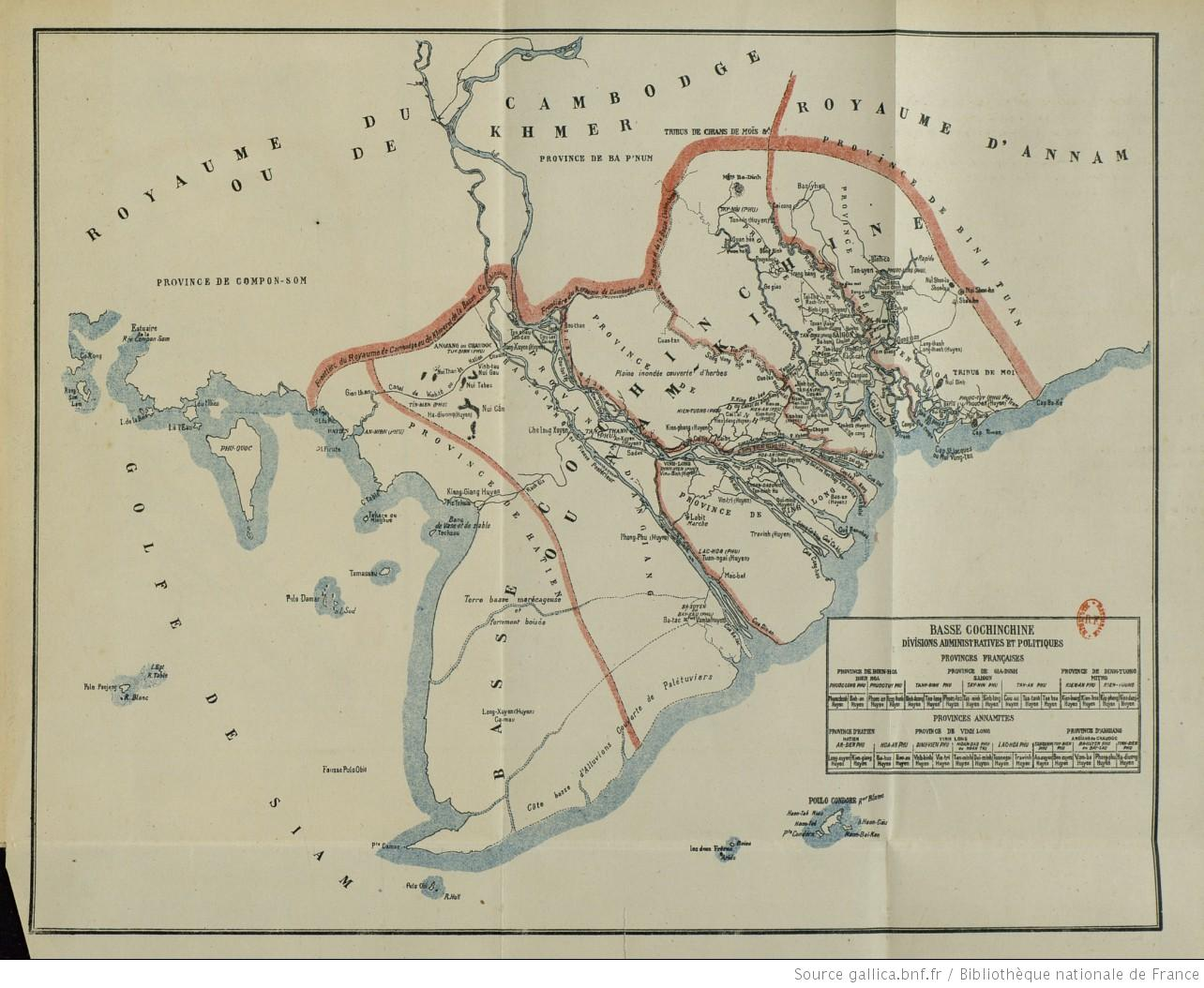
Basse Cochinchine map

The Six Provinces of Southern Vietnam (Vietnamese: Nam Kỳ Lục tỉnh, 南圻六省 or just Lục tỉnh, 六省) is a historical name for the region of Southern Vietnam, which is referred to in French as Basse-Cochinchine (Lower Cochinchina, or Hạ Đàng Trong). The region was politically defined and established after the inauguration of the Nguyễn dynasty in 1802, and called by this name from 1832, when Emperor Minh Mạng introduced administrative reforms.

The six provinces into which Emperor Minh Mạng divided Southern Vietnam in 1832 are:

- Phan Yên, later changed name to Gia Định (provincial capital: Sài Gòn)
- Biên Hòa (provincial capital: Biên Hòa)
- Định Tường (provincial capital: Mỹ Tho)
- Vĩnh Long (provincial capital: Vĩnh Long)
- An Giang (provincial capital: Châu Đốc)
- Hà Tiên (provincial capital: Hà Tiên)

These provinces are often subdivided into two groups: the three eastern provinces of Gia Định, Định Tường, and Biên Hòa; and the three western provinces of Vĩnh Long, An Giang, and Hà Tiên.

The French occupied three eastern provinces in 1862 during the Cochinchina campaign and eventually annexed all six provinces in 1867, establishing the colony of French Cochinchina. In October 1887, Cochinchina was integrated into French Indochina, which lasted until March 1945.

== History ==
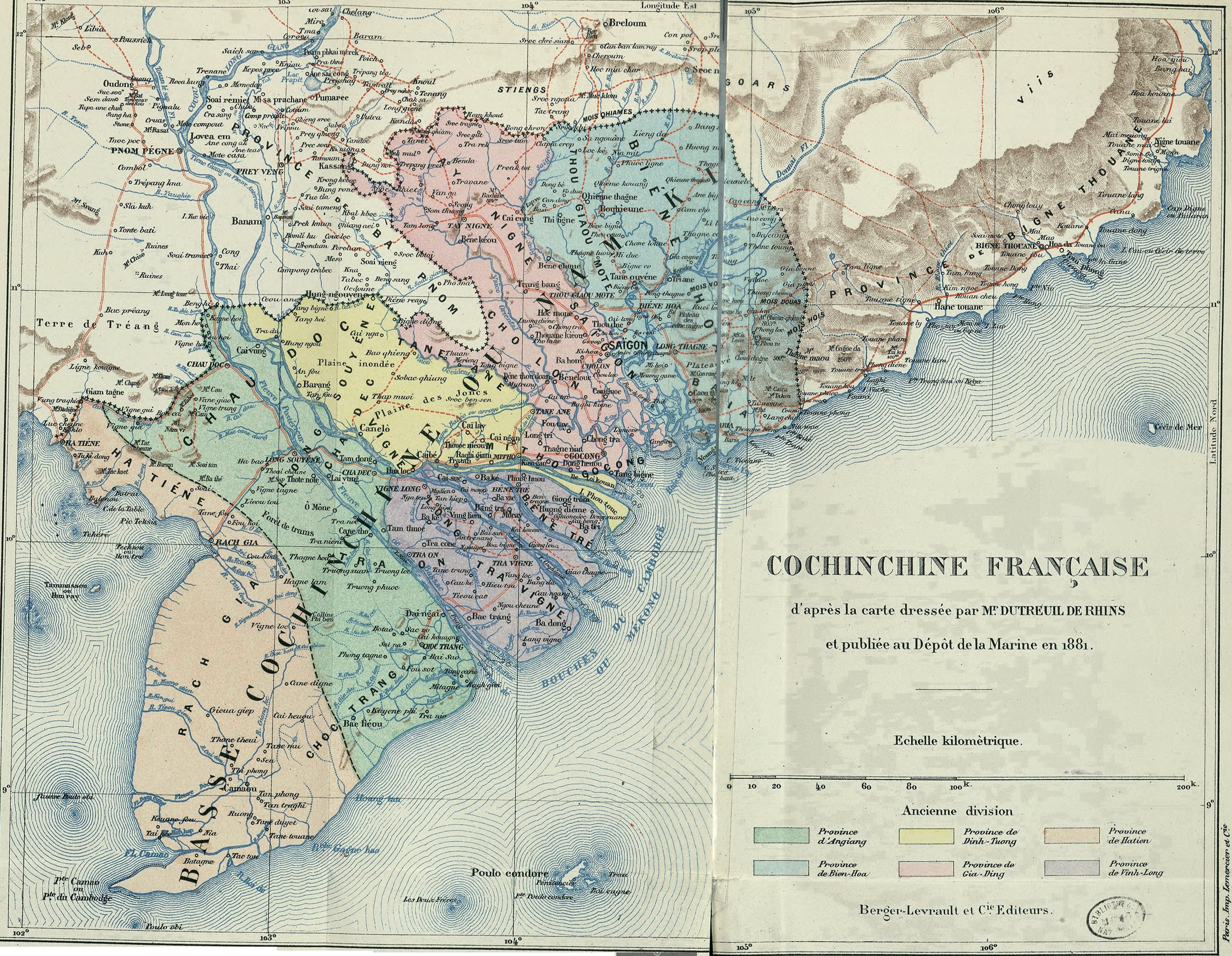
French Cochinchina (Basse Cochinchine Française) in 1881, based on the Nguyễn dynasty's Six Provinces before 1861. The northern bank of Vĩnh Tế Canal and the Parrot's Beak of Svay Rieng were ceded to the Cambodian Kingdom.

The Mekong Delta region (the location of the Six Provinces) was gradually annexed by Vietnam from the Khmer Empire starting in the mid 17th century to the early 19th century, through their Nam tiến territorial expansion campaign. In 1832, Emperor Minh Mạng divided Southern Vietnam into the six provinces Nam Kỳ Lục tỉnh.

According to the Đại Nam nhất thống chí (Nguyễn dynasty national atlas) of the Quốc sử quán (official Nguyễn-era compilation of Vietnamese history, geography and people from 1821 to 1945), in 1698 the lord Nguyễn Phúc Chu established the prefecture (phủ) of Gia Định. In 1802, emperor Gia Long turned Gia Định prefecture into a township, and in 1808, he renamed Gia Định prefecture into a governorate containing the five townships of Phan Yên, Biên Hòa (or Đồng Nai), Định Tường, Vĩnh Thanh (or Vĩnh Long), and Hà Tiên. In 1832, emperor Minh Mạng renamed Phan Yên Citadel into Gia Định Citadel, and the 5 townships were turned into the six provinces of Phan Yên, Biên Hòa, Định Tường, Vĩnh Long, Hà Tiên, and the newly established An Giang. Thus, the Six Provinces was created in 1832; and in 1834 the Six Provinces were collectively called Nam Kỳ ("Southern Region", which would eventually be known in the West as Cochinchina). Phan Yên province was renamed to Gia Định province in 1835.

After the French colonial invaders, led by vice-admiral Charles Rigault de Genouilly attacked and captured the three eastern provinces of Gia Định, Định Tường, and Biên Hòa in 1862, and invaded the remaining western provinces of Vĩnh Long, An Giang, Hà Tiên in 1867, the French Empire abolished the administrative divisions created by the Nguyễn dynasty. At first, the French used départements instead of prefectures, and arrondissements in place of districts (huyện). By 1868, the former Nam Kỳ Lục tỉnh had over 20 arrondissements (districts). Cochinchina was ruled by a French government-appointed governor in Saigon, and each county had a Secrétaire d’Arrondissement (en: "County Secretary", vi: "thư ký địa hạt" or "bang biện"). Bạc Liêu county was created in 1882. On 16 January 1899, the counties were changed into provinces per a French government decree, each with a provincial premier (fr: "chef de la province", vi: "chủ tỉnh") who is head of provincial government.

=== French division into 21 smaller provinces, discontinuation of the Six Provinces ===
The French government divided the original six provinces into 21 smaller ones. Following the 1899 decrees, starting 01/01/1900 Nam Kỳ would be divided into the following 21 provinces:

- Gia Định province was divided into the 5 provinces of: Gia Định, Chợ Lớn, Tân An, Tây Ninh, and Gò Công.
- Biên Hòa province was divided into the 4 provinces of: Biên Hòa, Bà Rịa, Thủ Dầu Một, and Cap Saint-Jacques (later Vũng Tàu province). Cap Saint Jacques was created on 30/04/1929 and dissolved 01/01/1935; in 1947 the province was re-established under the name Vũng Tàu until 1952 when it was dissolved again.
- Định Tường province became Mỹ Tho province.
- Vĩnh Long province was divided into the 3 provinces of: Vĩnh Long, Bến Tre, and Trà Vinh.
- An Giang province was divided into the 5 provinces of: Châu Đốc, Long Xuyên, Sa Đéc, Sóc Trăng, and Cần Thơ.
- Hà Tiên province was divided into the 3 provinces of: Hà Tiên, Rạch Giá, Bạc Liêu.
- On 11/05/1944 Tân Bình province was created, carved out of Gia Định province.

The reason for this division into 21 provinces was because the French Empire intended to erase the name "Lục tỉnh" from the hearts and minds of the Vietnamese people and language, and cut any feelings of attachment and Vietnamese nationalism with this region to avert potential local revolution or rebellion. However, in 1908 the newspaper Lục Tỉnh Tân Văn ("Six Provinces News") whose editor was Gilbert Trần Chánh Chiếu, still commonly used the names "Lục Tỉnh" and "Lục Châu". The French Empire called Southern Vietnam (Nam Kỳ) Cochinchine, Northern Vietnam (Bắc Kỳ) Tonkin and Central Vietnam (Trung Kỳ) Annam. Cochinchina itself was an exonym.

== Administrative divisions ==
Biên Hòa province	Gia Định province	Định Tường province	Vĩnh Long province	An Giang province	Hà Tiên province
Phước Long (Dô Sa) Prefecture Counties: Phước Chính; Phước Bình; Bình An; Nghĩa An	Tân Bình (Sài Gòn) Prefecture Counties: Bình Dương; Bình Long (Hóc Môn); Tân Long (Chợ Lớn)	Kiến An (Cai Tài Market) Prefecture Counties: Kiến Hưng; Kiến Hòa	Định Viễn (Vĩnh Long) Prefecture Counties: Vĩnh Bình; Vĩnh Trị	Tuy Biên Prefecture Counties: Tây Xuyên; Phong Phú; Hà Dương; Hà Âm; (Hà Âm county, which is north of Vĩnh Tế Canal, is now part of Takéo province, Cambodia).	An Biên Prefecture Counties: Hà Châu; Kiên Giang; Long Xuyên, which includes Phú Quốc Island
Phước Tuy (Mô Xoài) Prefecture Counties: Phước An; Long Thành; Long Khánh	Tân An Prefecture (later split into): Tân An (Vũng Gù) Prefecture, and; Hòa Thạnh (Gò Công) Prefecture; Counties: Cửu An (Vũng Gù), later in Tân An Prefecture; Phúc Lộc (Cần Giuộc), later in Tân An Prefecture; Tân Hòa (Gò Công), later in Hòa Thạnh Prefecture; Tân Thịnh (Kỳ Son), later in Hòa Thạnh Prefecture	Kiến Tường (Cao Lãnh) Prefecture Counties: Kiến Phong; Kiến Đăng	Hoằng Trị (Bến Tre) Prefecture Counties: Bảo Hựu; Bảo An; Tân Minh; Duy Minh	Tân Thành Prefecture Counties: Đông Xuyên; Vĩnh An; An Xuyên	Quảng Biên Prefecture (which formerly included today's Cambodian provinces of Kampot (vi: Cần Vột), Kep, and Sihanoukville (Kampong Som) (vi: Vũng Thơm)). Counties: Kampot (vi: Cần Vọt, Khai Biên); Kampong Som (vi: Vũng Thơm)
-	Tây Ninh Prefecture (which formerly included Svay Rieng province in Cambodia today) Counties: Tân Ninh (Tây Ninh); Quang Hóa (Trảng Bàng), which incl. Svay Rieng	-	Lạc Hóa (Chà Vinh) Prefecture Counties: Tuân Nghĩa; Trà Vinh, which incl. Côn Đảo Is.	Ba Xuyên Prefecture Counties: Phong Nhiêu; Vĩnh Định; Phong Thịnh	-

Sources for entire table:

== See also ==
- French Cochinchina
- Provinces of Vietnam
- Đại Nam nhất thống chí
- Gilbert Trần Chánh Chiếu
- Siamese–Vietnamese War (1840–1845)
