= Vĩnh Tế Canal =

Canal in southern Vietnam

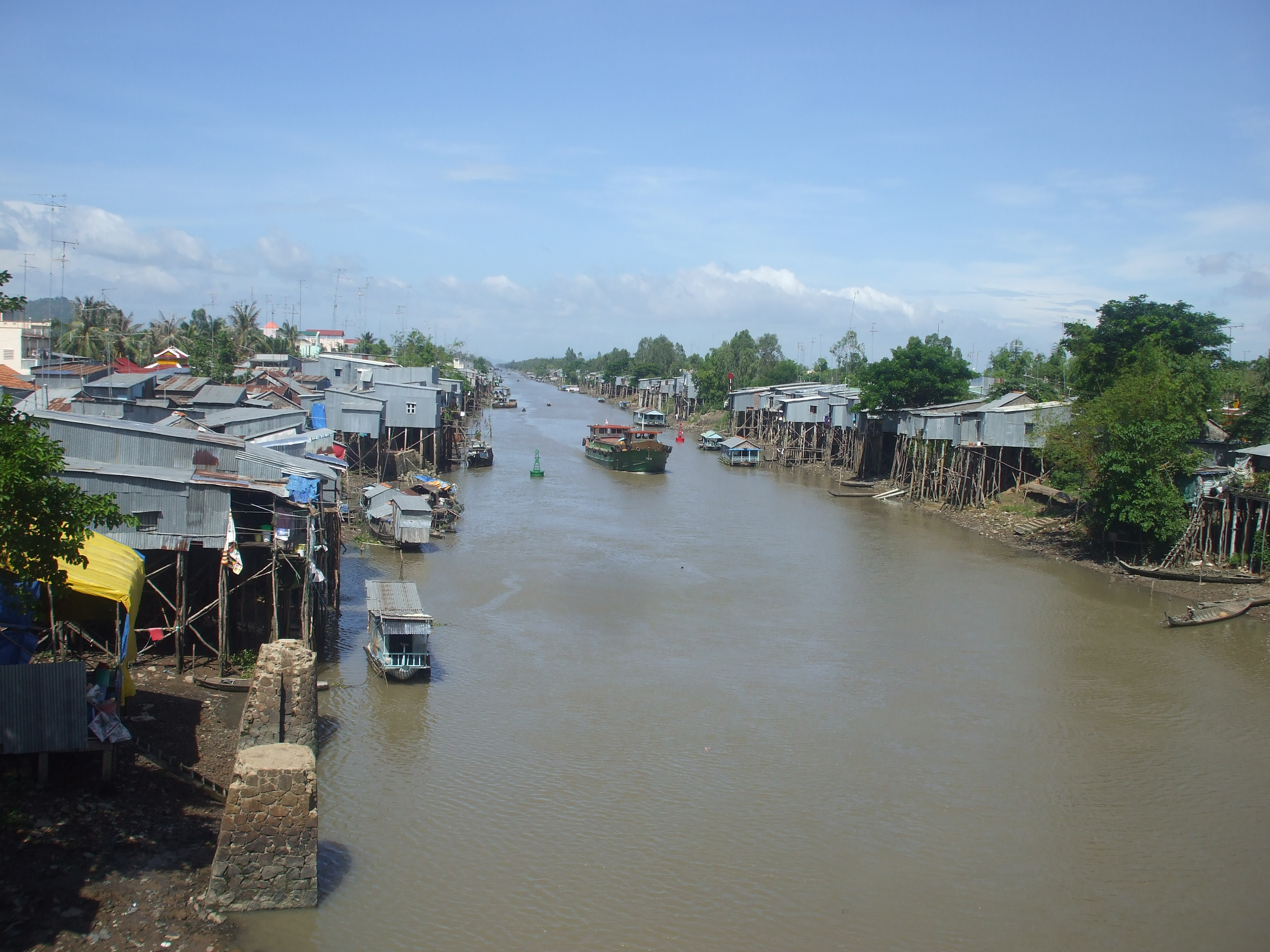
- A portion of Vĩnh Tế Canal in Châu Đốc, An Giang Province
- Interactive map of Vĩnh Tế Canal
- Country: Vietnam

Specifications
- Length: 87 km (54 miles)

Geography
- Direction: Southwest
- Start point: Châu Đốc
- End point: near Hà Tiên
- Beginning coordinates: 10°43′08″N 105°06′50″E
- Ending coordinates: 10°31′55″N 104°35′56″E

The Vĩnh Tế Canal (Vietnamese: Kênh Vĩnh Tế / 涇永濟, Khmer: ព្រែកជីក or ព្រែកយួន) is an 87-kilometre-long (54 mi) canal in southern Vietnam, designed to give the territory of Châu Đốc a direct access to the Hà Tiên sea gate, Gulf of Siam.

== Background ==
Construction of the Vĩnh Tế Canal began in 1819, during the Nguyễn dynasty, a period that saw significant expansion and consolidation of the Vietnamese state during Trịnh and Nguyễn lords era. In particular, the Khmer regions of Siem Reap, Battambang, the Cardamom Mountains, the southern coast, and Hà Tiên were sites of contestation for both Siamese and Vietnamese rule.

After the construction of Thoại Hà Canal, Emperor Gia Long of Nguyễn dynasty ordered the mandarin Nguyễn Văn Thoại to dig a new canal along the today Cambodian–Vietnamese border. The emperor's edict said: "this canal-digging project is tough, but its role in [our] national security and national defense is not small, we should accept the hardship so that our descendants would have the benefit".

Alongside other canals constructed in the early nineteenth century, the Vĩnh Tế Canal facilitated the advancement of the Vietnamese state into the Kampuchea Krom region of the Khmer world through both infrastructural and defense support.

== Construction ==
The construction of the canal was started in the end of 1819. The project used about 80,000 local Vietnamese and Khmer workers. After the death of Emperor Gia Long, the succeeding Emperor Minh Mạng continued the project.

When the construction was completed in 1824, Emperor Minh Mạng named the canal after Châu Vĩnh Tế, the wife of its builder Nguyen Van Thoai. Historian David Biggs suggests that the naming of the canal sought to honor her for "[arranging] aid for and [consoling] loved ones of workers killed by disease and fighting" resulting from its construction.
