= Phraya Rachasetthi (Chen Lian) =

Thai general

- พระยาราชาเศรษฐี

Governor of Hà Tiên
- In office 1771–1773
- Monarch: Taksin
- Preceded by: Mạc Thiên Tứ
- Succeeded by: Mạc Tử Sinh

Phrakhlang (Minister of Trade and Treasury)
- In office 1767(?)–1771
- Monarch: Taksin
- Preceded by: Chaophraya Phrakhlang
- Succeeded by: Phraya Phichai Aisawan Yang Jinzong

Phraya Rachasetthi (Thai: พระยาราชาเศรษฐี), personal name Chen Lian (陳聯 pinyin: Chén Lián) or Tang Lieng (Teochew: dang^{5} liêng^{5}) or Trần Liên (in Vietnamese sources) was the governor of Hà Tiên from 1771 to 1773, appointed by King Taksin of Thonburi. He was a Teochew Chinese general of the Thonburi Kingdom, formerly known as Luang Phiphit (หลวงพิพิธ) and Phraya Phiphit (พระยาพิพิธ). He was also known colloquially as Chao Khrua Lian (เจ้าขรัวเหลียน) or Chiêu Khoa Liên (昭科聯) and as Phraya Rachasethi Chin (พระยาราชาเศรษฐีจีน, "the Chinese governor of Hà Tiên").

Nidhi Eoseewong proposed that Chen Lian was originally Khun Phiphit Wathi (Thai: ขุนพิพิธวาที), a minor Chinese official serving under Ayutthaya who joined the forces of Phraya Tak during the latter's journey from Ayutthaya to Chanthaburi in 1767. Chen Lian was then one of the original followers of Phraya Tak, who was also of Teochew Chinese descent. Khun Phiphit Wathi commanded the Chinese regiment during Phraya Tak's battle against the local resistance in Rayong in 1767. Yumio Sakurai and Takako Kitagawa (北川香子) proposed that Chen Lian was the Teochew Chinese merchant-pirate by the name of Chen Tai (陳太 pinyin: Chén Tài) or Trần Thái. Chen Tai gathered his forces at Mount Bạch Mã to attack the port-city of Hà Tiên. However, Mạc Thiên Tứ, the Cantonese ruler of Hà Tiên, managed to send forces to repel Chen Tai. Chen Tai fled to Chanthaburi and joined Phraya Tak under the name of Chiam (เจียม).

Regardless of his origin, Chen Lian partook with Phraya Tak when he led his fleet from Chanthaburi to reconquer Central Siam in October 1767. Phraya Tak sent his two generals Phraya Phiphit Chen Lian and Phraya Phichairacha as vanguard to attack the Burmese garrison at Phosamton to the north of Ayutthaya under the Mon commander Thugyi. After the victory at Phosamton, Phraya Tak enthroned himself as King Taksin of the newly founded Thonburi kingdom. Taksin appointed Phraya Phiphit Chen Lian to be the acting Phrakhlang or Kosathibodi, the minister of Trade and Treasury, without actually assuming the title of Phrakhlang. De Fels proposed that the full title of Phraya Phiphit was Phraya Phiphit Phokhakorn the governor of Trat. When Zheng Rui (鄭瑞), a Qing Chinese delegate, arrived to investigate the events at Hà Tiên in 1768, Chen Lian's name appeared as one of the followers of Phraya Tak in the report of Zheng Rui.

In 1769, Taksin sent Phraya Kosa Chen Lian to lead the Siamese forces to attack Cambodia through Prachinburi. Phraya Kosa managed to temporarily seize Battambang. However, the campaign was not successful. In the same year, in 1769, Mạc Thiên Tứ sent a Hà Tiên navy under Trần Hầu (Trần Đại Lực) to attack Chanthaburi. The Siamese defender of Chanthaburi was Trần Lai (陳來), whom Sakurai and Kitagawa proposed to be the same person as Trần Liên and Trần Thái. He defeated the Hà Tiên navy and forced them to retreat.

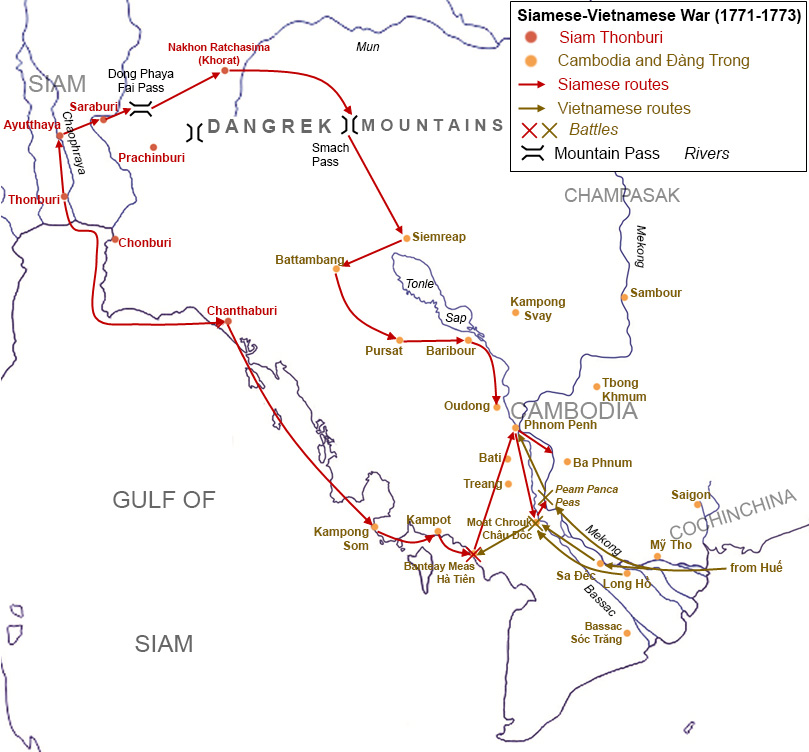
Phraya Phiphit Chen Lian led King Taksin's naval fleet to invade and conquer Hà Tiên in 1771, becoming governor of Hà Tiên for two years until his retreat in 1773.

In late 1771, King Taksin conducted his campaigns to invade and conquer Hà Tiên. He sent Phraya Phiphit Chen Lian ahead as the admiral and another Chinese Phraya Phichai Aisawan (พระยาพิชัยไอศวรรย์), personal name Yang Chin-chong or Yang Jinzong (楊進宗), as vanguard. The Siamese-Chinese naval forces successfully seized Hà Tiên in November 1771 with Mạc Thiên Tứ fleeing to Cochinchina under protection of the Nguyen Lord. Taksin then made Phraya Phiphit Chen Lian the new governor of Hà Tiên with the title of Phraya Rachasetthi. Phraya Phichai Aisawan Yang Jinzong was made to succeed Chen Lian as the acting Phrakhlang. In Thai sources, Chen Lian was known by the epithet Phraya Rachasetthi Chin "the Chinese governor of Hà Tiên", in contrast to Mạc Thiên Tứ who was known as Phraya Rachasetthi Yuan (พระยาราชาเศรษฐีญวน) "the Vietnamese governor of Hà Tiên".

Next year in 1772, Mạc Thiên Tứ sent reports to the Qing court about the downfall of his city;

Last year Zheng Xin (Taksin) conducted an expedition with a vast force of ten thousand soldiers. Chen Lian was an admiral for the fleet and Yang Jinzong, a captain of Siamese tributary ship, led the van.

A Vietnamese source stated that;

Phi Nha Tan (Taksin) took command of 2,000 soldiers for the invasion of Hà Tiên, with Trần Thái of Bạch Mã as a guide.

In 1772, the Nguyen Lord Nguyễn Phúc Thuần organized the Vietnamese counter-offensives. The Vietnamese forces took Hà Tiên, forcing Chen Lian to flee to Kampot. Oknha Panglima the governor of Kampot provided Chen Lian with shelter and military forces. After three days, Chen Lian managed to raise a fleet from Kampot to retake Hà Tiên from the Vietnamese. Chen Lian reported the Vietnamese counter-offensives to King Taksin at Thonburi. King Taksin then realized that the Siamese hold on Hà Tiên was untenable so he decided to order the withdrawal of Siamese troops from Hà Tiên in 1773. Chen Lian gathered the remaining inhabitants of Hà Tiên to be boarded on ships to Thonburi.

Little was known about Phraya Rachasetthi Chen Lian after 1773. He retained his title even though he did not actually govern Hà Tiên anymore. His role shifted to the command of Taksin's royal Chinese regiment. During the Bangkaeo Campaign in February 1775, Taksin ordered Phraya Rachasetthi Chen Lian to lead his Chinese regiment to guard the town of Ratchaburi against the incoming Burmese invasion. In late 1775, during Maha Thiha Thura's Invasion when Taksin marched to the north to relieve the Burmese siege of Phitsanulok, he commanded Chen Lian to guard the royal supply line at Nakhon Sawan.

During the later years of Thonburi, Phraya Rachasetthi Chen Lian became the leader of Teochew Chinese community. A Burmese map showed his house, on the eastern bank of Chaophraya opposite from Thonburi, surrounded by Teochiu communities, perhaps indicating that he had the capacity as a leader of Teochew Chinese in the city. When King Rama I moved the Siamese capital from Thonburi across Chaophraya to Bangkok on the eastern bank in 1782, he ordered Phraya Rachasetthi and the Teochew Chinese to relocate to Sampheng.

Regnal titles
Preceded by Mạc Thiên Tứ	Ruler of Hà Tiên; 1771–1773	Succeeded by Mạc Thiên Tứ
