= Gò Công province =

Historic province of Vietnam

Gò Công Tỉnh Gò Công
- Province
- Interactive map of Gò Công
- Country: South Vietnam
- City: Gò Công
- Established: 1900
- Dissolved: 1976

Gò Công was a former province of Vietnam under the French Indochina and the South Vietnam. It contained the town of Gò Công, now in Tiền Giang province of reunified Vietnam.

== History ==
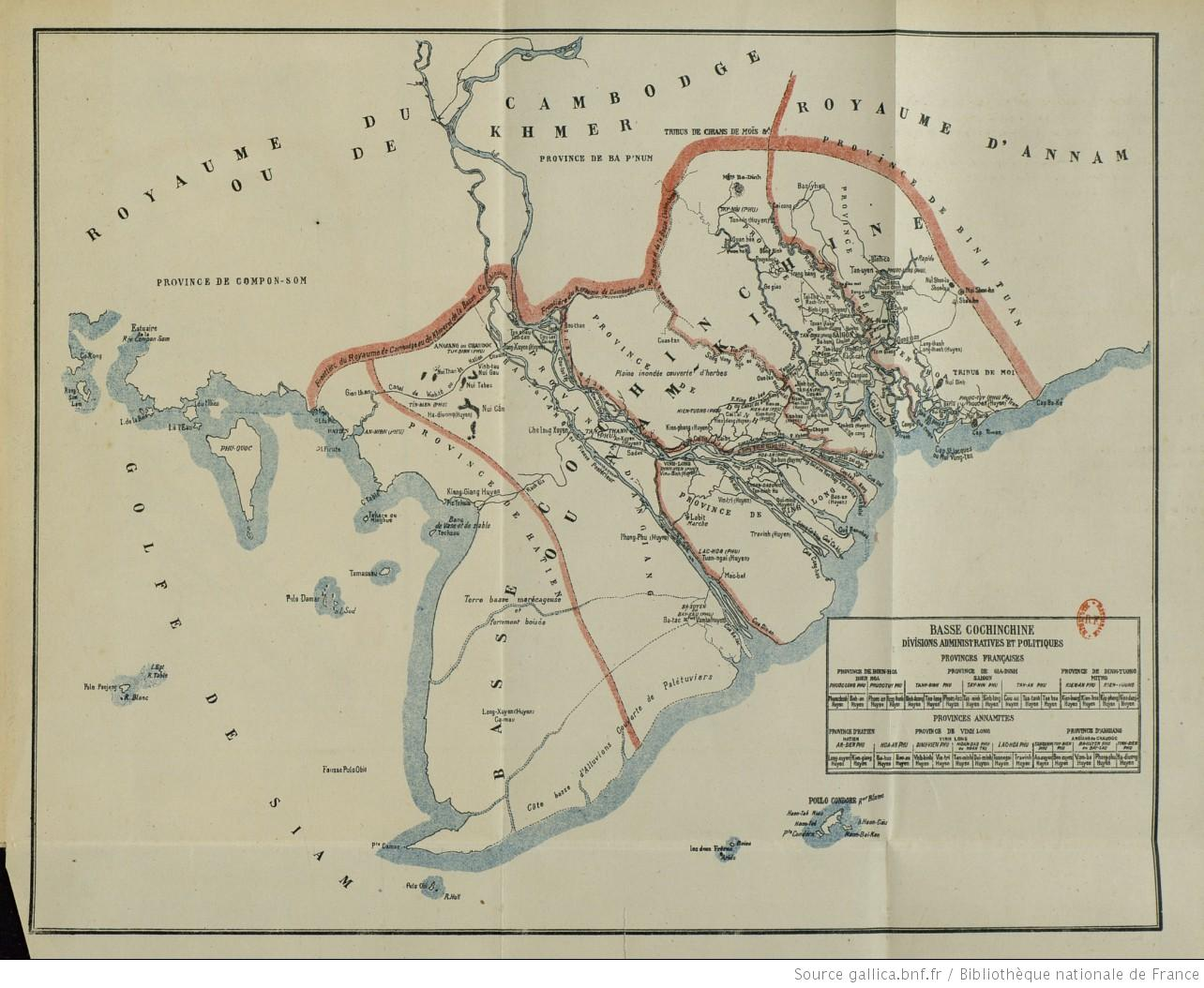
Six Provinces in 1861, with Gò Công inside Gia Định, and Bến Tre inside Vĩnh Long

Gò Công was originally Cambodia's Lôi Lạp prefecture. In 1750, Cambodian King Nặc Nguyên (Ang Snguon) provoked then was defeated by the Nguyễn lords forces and fled into Hà Tiên. In 1755, Ang Snguon paid his two prefectures: Tầm Bôn (Tân An) and Lôi Lạp (Gò Công) as tribute to Nguyễn lords to get pardoned and returned to Cambodia.

In the 5th year under Gia Long (1806), Gò Công together with Bến Tre belonged to Kiến Hòa canton of Kiến An prefecture, Định Tường protectorate. In the 12th year under Minh Mạng (1831), Gò Công was separated to form Tân Hòa district. In the 1st year under Thiệu Trị (1841), Gò Công was merged into Tân An prefecture of Gia Định protectorate, Bến Tre stayed in Định Tường protectorate.

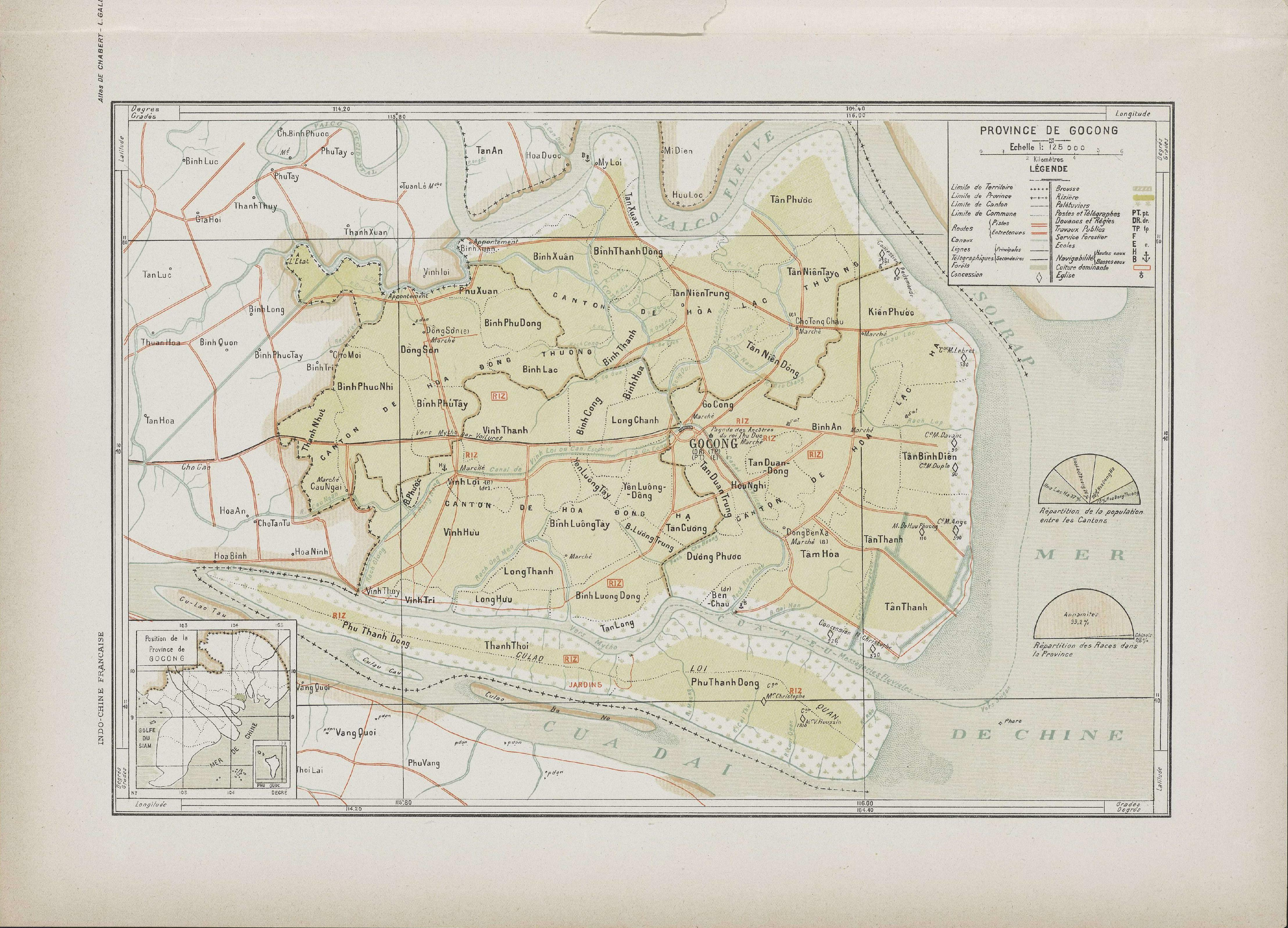
Gò Công province in 1909

The area of the Gò Công province was where Trương Định had attacked the French in 1861.

In 1900, the French officially established Gò Công province based on Tân Hòa district, comprising four cantons: Hòa Đồng Thượng, Hòa Đồng Hạ, Hòa Lạc Thượng, Hòa Lạc Hạ. Some time later, the territory between Hòa Đồng Thượng, Hòa Đồng Hạ was separated to form the fifth canton: Hòa Đồng Trung.

The province was separated from Gia Định province by a river boundary.
