= Mạc Thiên Tứ =

18th-century Vietnamese leader

Mạc Thiên Tứ 鄚天賜
- Tông Đức hầu
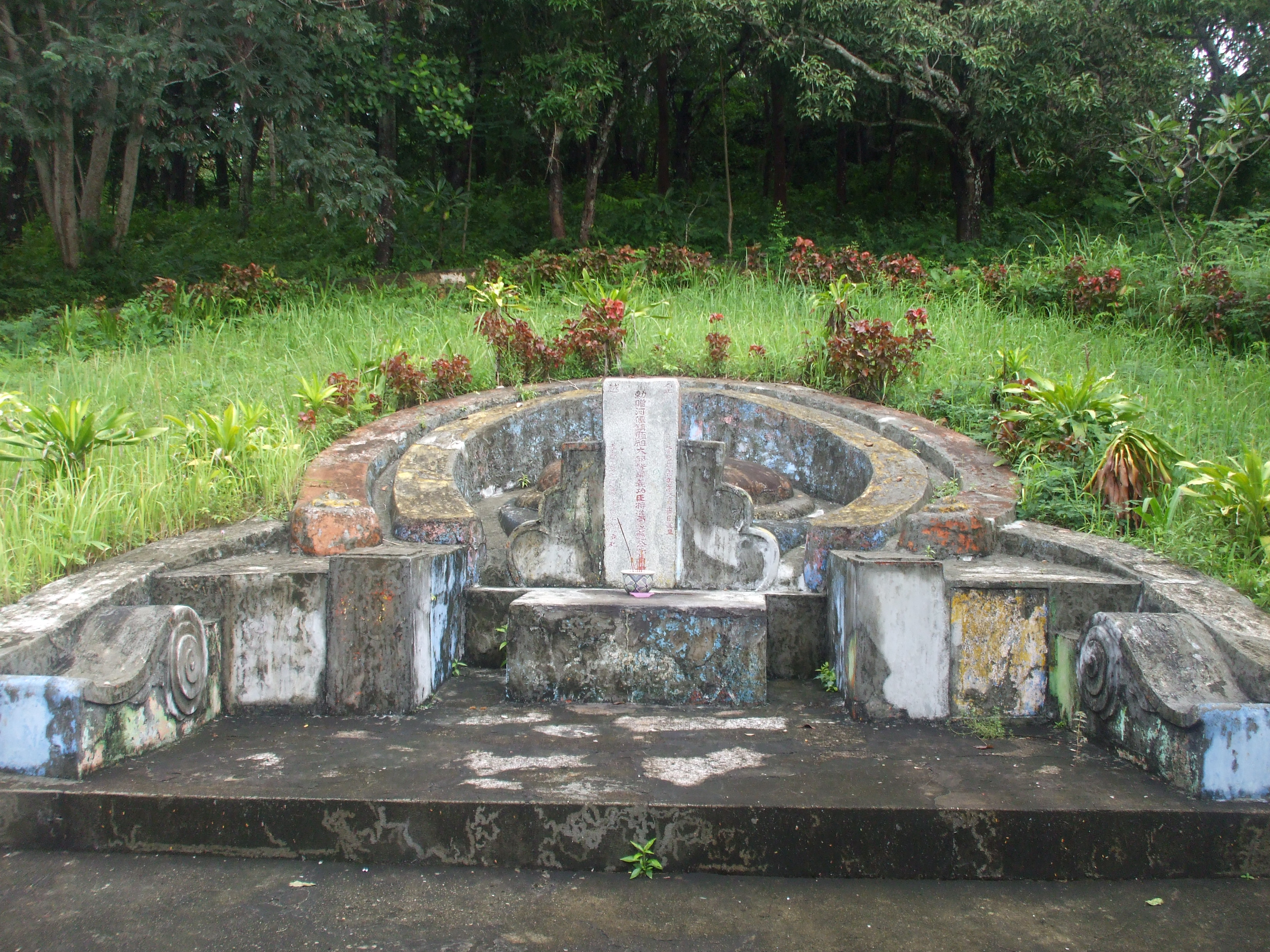
- Tomb of Mạc Thiên Tứ

King of Hà Tiên
- Reign: 18 July 1735 – 1771
- Predecessor: Mạc Cửu
- Successor: Tang Lieng (Siamese occupation)
- Reign: 1773 – 1777
- Predecessor: Tang Lieng (Siamese occupation)
- Successor: vacant (next: Mạc Tử Sanh)
- Born: January 1, 1718 or December 16, 1705 or December 12, 1699; Hà Tiên trấn
- Died: June 18, 1780 (age 62, 74, 80); Thonburi, Siam
- Spouse: Nguyễn Thị
Names
- Mạc Thiên Tích (鄚天錫); Mạc Thiên Tứ (鄚天賜); Mạc Tông (鄚琮); Mạc Sĩ Lân (莫士麟)
Regnal name
- Hà Tiên trấn khâm sai đô đốc Tông Đức hầu (河僊鎮欽差都督琮德侯); Đặc tiến quốc lão Hà Tiên trấn đô đốc Tông quận công (特進國老河僊鎮都督琮郡公); Preah Sotoat (ព្រះសុទត្ដ); Neak Somdec Preah Sotoat; Phraya Rachasethi Yuan
- Father: Mạc Cửu
- Mother: Bùi Thị Lẫm (裴氏廪)

Mạc Thiên Tứ

Chinese name
- Chinese: 鄚天賜
Transcriptions
Standard Mandarin
- Hanyu Pinyin: Mò Tiāncì
- Wade–Giles: Mo^{4} Tien^{1}-tzʻŭ^{4}
Yue: Cantonese
- Jyutping: Mok^{6} Tin^{1}-ci^{3}
Southern Min
- Hokkien POJ: Bo̍h Thian-sù

Vietnamese name
- Vietnamese: Mạc Thiên Tứ

Mạc Thiên Tứ (chữ Hán: 鄚天賜, pinyin: Mò Tiāncì, Khmer: ម៉ាក់ ធានទឺ, December 12, 1699 or December 16, 1705 or January 1, 1718 – June 18, 1780), also known as Mạc Thiên Tích (鄚天錫) or Mạc Tông (鄚琮, Khmer: ម៉ាក់ តុង), was a Vietnamese leader who ruled Hà Tiên from 1735 to 1771 and from 1773 to 1777. He was called Mo Shilin (Chinese: 莫士麟; pinyin: Mò Shìlín, Thai: ม่อซื่อหลิน) in Veritable Records of Qing dynasty.

He was the eldest son of Mạc Cửu, and born to a Vietnamese woman from Biên Hòa. He also had a sister, Mạc Kim Định, who was married to the son of the Chinese general Trần Thượng Xuyên. After his father's death, he received the title of Tổng binh of Hà Tiên and the noble title Marquess Tông Đức (Vietnamese: Tông Đức hầu) from Nguyễn lord. His reign saw the golden age of Hà Tiên. A proper bureaucratic structure was set up, their military saw a massive increase in size and power, castles and business streets were erected, and Hà Tiên's economy prospered under him. Hà Tiên became the trade center in Mekong Delta; it became the best-known port in the Gulf of Siam long before the founding of Saigon and Bangkok. In his 1742 letter to Japanese Tokugawa shogunate in Khmer, he called himself Reachea Krong Kampucea Tiptei (រាជាក្រុងកម្ពុជាធិបតី, "king of Cambodia") and later Neak Somdec Preah Sotoat (អ្នកសម្ដចព្រះសុទត្ដ). However, Siamese sources called him both Ong Chien Chun (องเชียงชุน, "Chinese general") and Phraya Rachasethi (พระยาราชาเศรษฐี), thus confusing him with Oknya Reachea Sedthei (ឧកញ៉ារាជាសេដ្ឋី), the Khmer governor of Banteay Meas.

Mạc Thiên Tứ was also interested in Chinese culture, and built many schools. He adopted a policy of religious tolerance, he treated all religions evenhandedly. Pierre Pigneau de Behaine, a French Catholic priest, was allowed to preach in Hà Tiên.

According to Vietnamese source, in 1739, a Cambodian army led by "Nặc Bồn" invaded Hà Tiên, but was utterly defeated by Tứ. From then on, Cambodia did not try to resume Hà Tiên. Though no Cambodian chronicle recorded this affair, Tứ's victory was highly significant since it allowed Hà Tiên to enjoy full independence from Cambodia thereafter.

In 1756, the Cambodian king Chey Chettha VII (Nặc Ong Nguyên) died. Thommo Reachea IV (Nặc Ông Yếm) succeeded the throne, but soon was murdered and usurped by Ang Hing (អង្គហ៊ីង, Nặc Hinh). A Cambodian prince, Ang Ton (Nặc Ông Tôn), fled to Hà Tiên. In there, Ang Ton became Mạc Thiên Tứ's adopted son. Tứ escorted Ang Ton back to Cambodia, and crowned him the new king as Outey II. In return, Outey ceded Hương Úc (modern Sihanoukville), Cần Bột (Kampot), Trực Sâm (Chhouk), Sài Mạt (Banteay Meas) and Linh Quỳnh (Kiri Vong) to Hà Tiên.

After War of the second fall of Ayutthaya, Mạc Thiên Tứ hid Siamese prince Chao Chui (เจ้าจุ้ย, Chiêu Thúy). Chao Chui was a son of Prince Aphai, and also a grandson of king Thai Sa. After Taksin crowned the new king of Siam, Chao Chui was regarded as a big threat by Taksin. Taksin tried to persuade Mạc Thiên Tứ to hand over Chao Chui, but was rejected. Instead, Tứ tried to install Chao Chui as the new Siamese king. In 1769, a Hà Tiên navy under Trần Hầu (Trần Đại Lực) was sent to attack Chantaburi. Taksin appointed Chiam (Tang Lieng or Trần Liên, Khun Phiphit Wathi), a Teochiu chief of the Chinese junk fleet, as the new vice-governor of Trat with the title Phraya Phiphit. Hà Tiên navy was defeated by Phraya Phiphit, and had to retreat.

Another incident increased the contradictions between Mạc Thiên Tứ and Taksin. After the defeat of Konbaung Burma, Taksin sent a tributary mission in Canton to require the royal seal, claiming that the throne of Ayutthaya Kingdom had come to an end. However, Tứ reported to Chinese mandarins that Taksin was a usurper. Qianlong rejected Taksin's request, and ordered Taksin to install Prince Chao Chui. Taksin was getting more and more irritated at Tứ's actions.

In 1771, Siamese army led by Taksin and Phraya Phiphit landed at Kampong Som (present-day Sihanoukville) and Kampot, then besieged and captured Hà Tiên. Tứ had to flee to Gia Định (modern Ho Chi Minh City) and seek refuge for Nguyễn lord. Taksin appointed Tang Lieng as the governor of Hà Tiên. Two years later, with the help of Nguyễn lord, Tứ returned to Hà Tiên.

In 1775, Nguyễn Phúc Thuần was defeated by Tây Sơn army and fled south. Tứ led troops to support him. Thuần was captured and executed by Tây Sơn rebel general Nguyễn Huệ in 1777. Huệ tried to persuade him to surrender, but was rejected. Tứ fled to Phú Quốc then to Siam. Tôn Thất Xuân, a mandarin of Nguyễn lord, also fled to Siam for support. In Thonburi, they were warmly welcome by King Taksin. Taksin also asked Tứ to bury their past misunderstandings. Tứ was awarded the Siamese rank and title Phraya Rachasethi Yuan (Thai: พระยาราชาเศรษฐี ญวน, lit. "Phraya Rachasethi the Vietnamese"), using the word "Yuan" (ญวน) to distinguish with the former governor Tang Lieng (Phraya Rachasethi Chin).

Nguyễn Ánh ascended the lord throne in 1780. Ánh sent envoys to Siam in order to seek alliance with Siam. In the same time, a Siamese merchant ship was looted by Đỗ Thanh Nhơn, an important military commander of Nguyễn lord. According to Vietnamese records, taking this opportunity, Nguyễn Huệ forged a letter from Ánh to Tứ, and sent it to Taksin. In the letter, Ánh planned to raid Thonburi, and ordered Tứ and Tôn Thất Xuân to help him on the inside. Taksin was taken in, and threw Mạc Thiên Tứ into prison. However, Thai record stated that Mạc Thiên Tứ planned to flee back to Hà Tiên, but was exposed, so Taksin arrested him.

Tứ committed suicide in prison. Two sons, Mạc Tử Hoàng and Mạc Tử Dung, his wife, Tôn Thất Xuân and the Vietnamese envoys were executed. His three sons, Mạc Tử Sanh, Mạc Tử Tuấn and Mạc Tử Thiêm, were rescued by Kalahom (Pok) and hid in countryside. After King Rama I ascended the Siamese throne, they were allowed to live in Bangkok. Later, Sinh became new ruler of Hà Tiên. In 1789, Mạc Công Bính, a son of Mạc Tử Hoàng, brought his body back to Vietnam, and buried in Hà Tiên.

== Family ==
Mạc Thiên Tứ had a large number of offsprings, including:

- Sons:
  - Mạc Tử Hoàng (鄚子潢), heir apparent, born to principal wife Nguyễn Thị
  - Mạc Tử Dung (鄚子溶) or Mạc Tử Duyên (鄚子沿), born to principal wife Nguyễn Thị
  - Mạc Tử Thảng (鄚子淌), born to principal wife Nguyễn Thị
  - Mạc Tử Sanh (鄚子泩), born to a concubine
  - Mạc Tử Tuấn (鄚子浚), born to a concubine
  - Mạc Tử Thiêm (鄚子添), born to a concubine
- Daughters:
  - Mạc Thị Long (鄚氏隆), born to principal wife Nguyễn Thị
  - Mạc Thị Hai (鄚氏咍), born to principal wife Nguyễn Thị
  - Mạc Thị Giác (鄚氏灚), born to principal wife Nguyễn Thị

== Sources ==
- Coedes, George (1966), The making of South East Asia, University of California Press, ISBN 978-0-520-05061-7
- Cooke, Nola; Li, Tana (2004), Water frontier: commerce and the Chinese in the Lower Mekong Region, 1750-1880, Rowman & Littlefield, ISBN 978-0-7425-3083-6
- Ooi, Keat Gin (2004), "Mac Thien Tu (1780-1800)", Southeast Asia: a historical encyclopedia, from Angkor Wat to East Timor, Volume 1, ABC-CLIO, pp. 806–807, ISBN 1-57607-770-5
- Dai, Kelai; Yang, Baoyun (1991), Ling nan zhi guai deng shi liao san zhong (in Chinese), Zhengzhou: Zhongzhou gu ji chu ban she, ISBN 7534802032

Regnal titles
Preceded by Mạc Cửu	Ruler of Hà Tiên; 1736–1771	Succeeded by Tang Lieng
Preceded by Tang Lieng	Ruler of Hà Tiên; 1773–1777	Vacant Title next held by Mạc Tử Sanh
