= Leizhou =

Leizhou 雷州市 Hoihong; Luichow
- County-level city
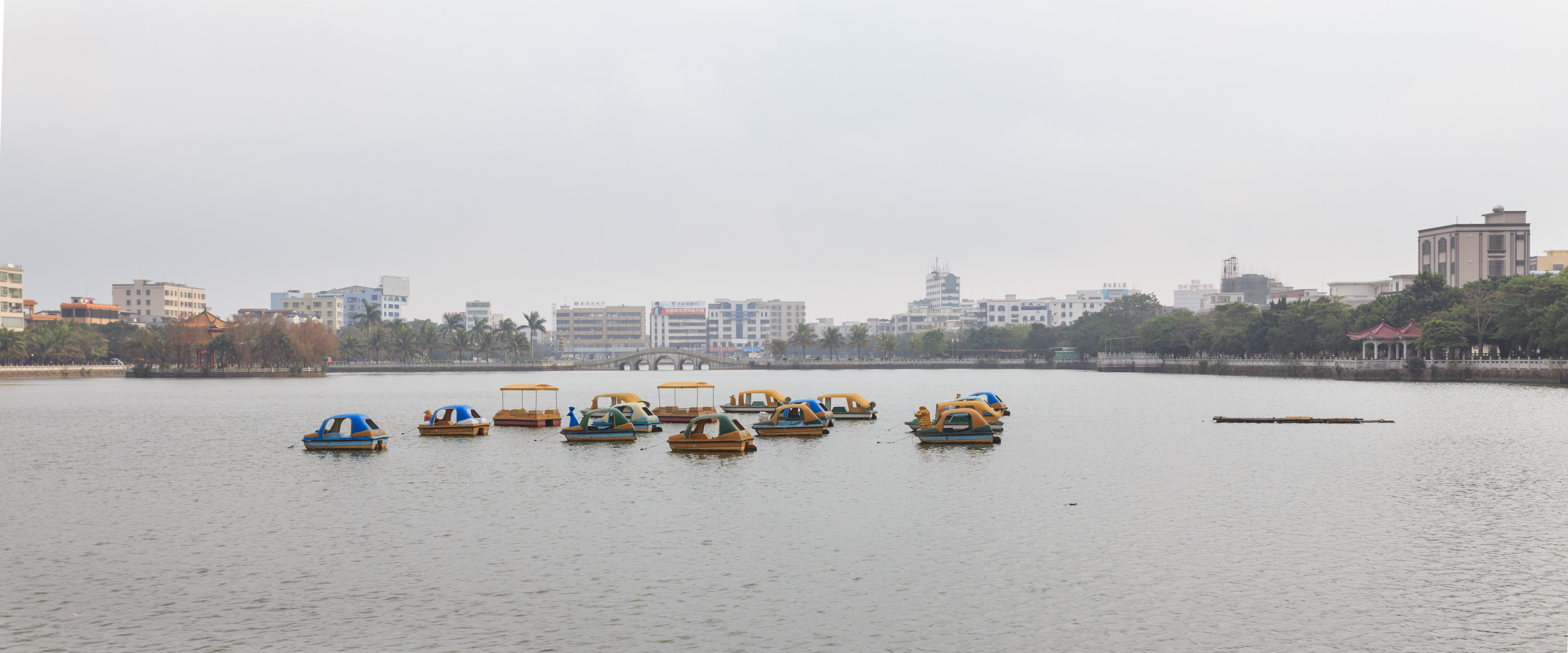

- Location in Guangdong
- Coordinates: 20°54′51″N 110°05′48″E
- Country: People's Republic of China
- Province: Guangdong
- Prefecture-level city: Zhanjiang

Area
  - Total: 2,523 km^{2} (974 sq mi)

Population (2020)
  - Total: 1,321,091
  - Density: 523.6/km^{2} (1,356/sq mi)
- Time zone: UTC+8 (China Standard)
- Local variety: Leizhou Min

Leizhou
- Traditional Chinese: 雷州
- Postal: Leichow
Transcriptions
Standard Mandarin
- Hanyu Pinyin: Léizhōu
- Wade–Giles: Lei2 Chou1
Yue: Cantonese
- Jyutping: Leoi4 Zau1
other Yue
- Taishanese: Lui5 Jau1
Southern Min
- Leizhou Romanization: Lui5 Ziu1

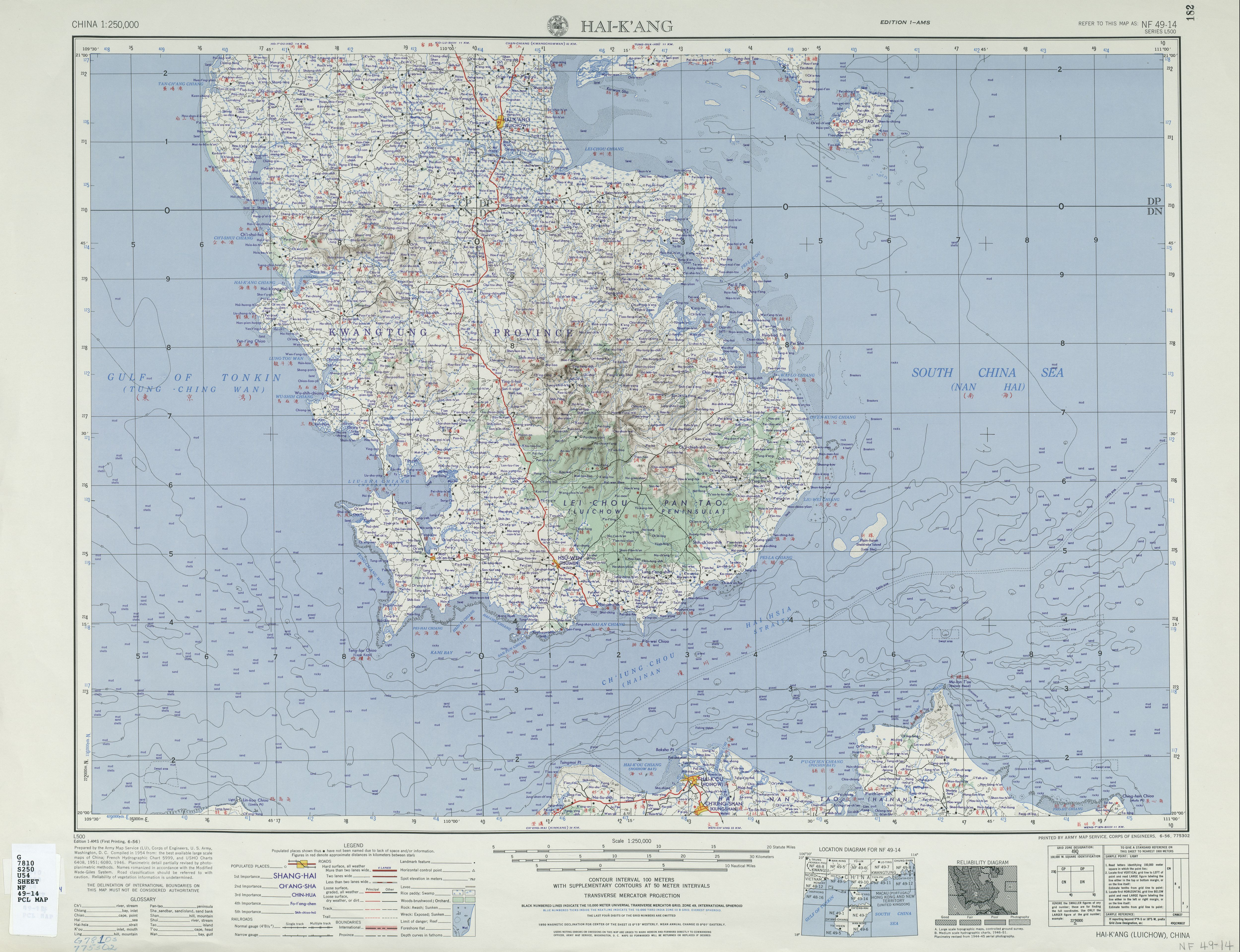
Leizhou (then romanized as HAI-K'ANG (LUICHOW) 海康（雷州）) (1954)

Leizhou (Chinese: 雷州) is a county-level city in Guangdong Province, China. It is under the jurisdiction of the prefecture-level city of Zhanjiang.

The city was formerly known as Haikang County (postal: Hoihong); it was upgraded into a city in 1994.

== Geography ==
Leizhou is located at the extreme southwestern end of Guangdong and lies on the Leizhou Peninsula.

== Transportation ==
- China National Highway 207

== Climate ==
Climate data for Leizhou, elevation 34 m (112 ft), (1991–2020 normals, extremes 1981–present)
Month	Jan	Feb	Mar	Apr	May	Jun	Jul	Aug	Sep	Oct	Nov	Dec	Year
Record high °C (°F)	29.5 (85.1)	34.4 (93.9)	37.5 (99.5)	39.5 (103.1)	38.6 (101.5)	37.7 (99.9)	38.5 (101.3)	36.5 (97.7)	36.3 (97.3)	34.5 (94.1)	32.9 (91.2)	29.6 (85.3)	39.5 (103.1)
Mean daily maximum °C (°F)	19.5 (67.1)	20.6 (69.1)	23.5 (74.3)	27.6 (81.7)	31.2 (88.2)	32.9 (91.2)	32.9 (91.2)	32.2 (90.0)	31.0 (87.8)	28.8 (83.8)	25.7 (78.3)	21.4 (70.5)	27.3 (81.1)
Daily mean °C (°F)	15.9 (60.6)	17.2 (63.0)	20.2 (68.4)	24.1 (75.4)	27.1 (80.8)	28.6 (83.5)	28.7 (83.7)	28.2 (82.8)	27.2 (81.0)	24.8 (76.6)	21.6 (70.9)	17.4 (63.3)	23.4 (74.2)
Mean daily minimum °C (°F)	13.5 (56.3)	15.1 (59.2)	18.0 (64.4)	21.6 (70.9)	24.3 (75.7)	25.7 (78.3)	25.8 (78.4)	25.5 (77.9)	24.5 (76.1)	22.0 (71.6)	18.7 (65.7)	14.6 (58.3)	20.8 (69.4)
Record low °C (°F)	2.8 (37.0)	3.7 (38.7)	4.8 (40.6)	10.8 (51.4)	15.6 (60.1)	20.1 (68.2)	21.8 (71.2)	21.6 (70.9)	17.0 (62.6)	12.3 (54.1)	6.6 (43.9)	2.4 (36.3)	2.4 (36.3)
Average precipitation mm (inches)	24.6 (0.97)	27.9 (1.10)	41.0 (1.61)	89.5 (3.52)	203.1 (8.00)	211.5 (8.33)	224.2 (8.83)	336.3 (13.24)	234.5 (9.23)	132.4 (5.21)	48.7 (1.92)	34.5 (1.36)	1,608.2 (63.32)
Average precipitation days (≥ 0.1 mm)	7.1	9.3	11.3	11.9	14.3	13.4	15.2	16.4	15.0	8.5	5.4	5.9	133.7
Average relative humidity (%)	83	87	89	88	84	82	82	85	85	81	79	78	84
Mean monthly sunshine hours	105.9	90.5	101.9	148.9	212.0	220.2	239.0	212.2	199.1	216.0	177.5	138.2	2,061.4
Percentage possible sunshine	31	28	27	39	52	55	59	54	55	60	53	41	46
Source: China Meteorological Administration all-time extreme temperatureall-time January record lowall-time October high

== Notable people ==
- Mạc Cửu (1655–1731): Founder of the Principality of Hà Tiên.

== See also ==
- Leizhou dialect
