= Principality of Hà Tiên =

Polity in southeast Asia (1707–1832)

Principality of Hà Tiên 河僊鎮
- 1707–1832
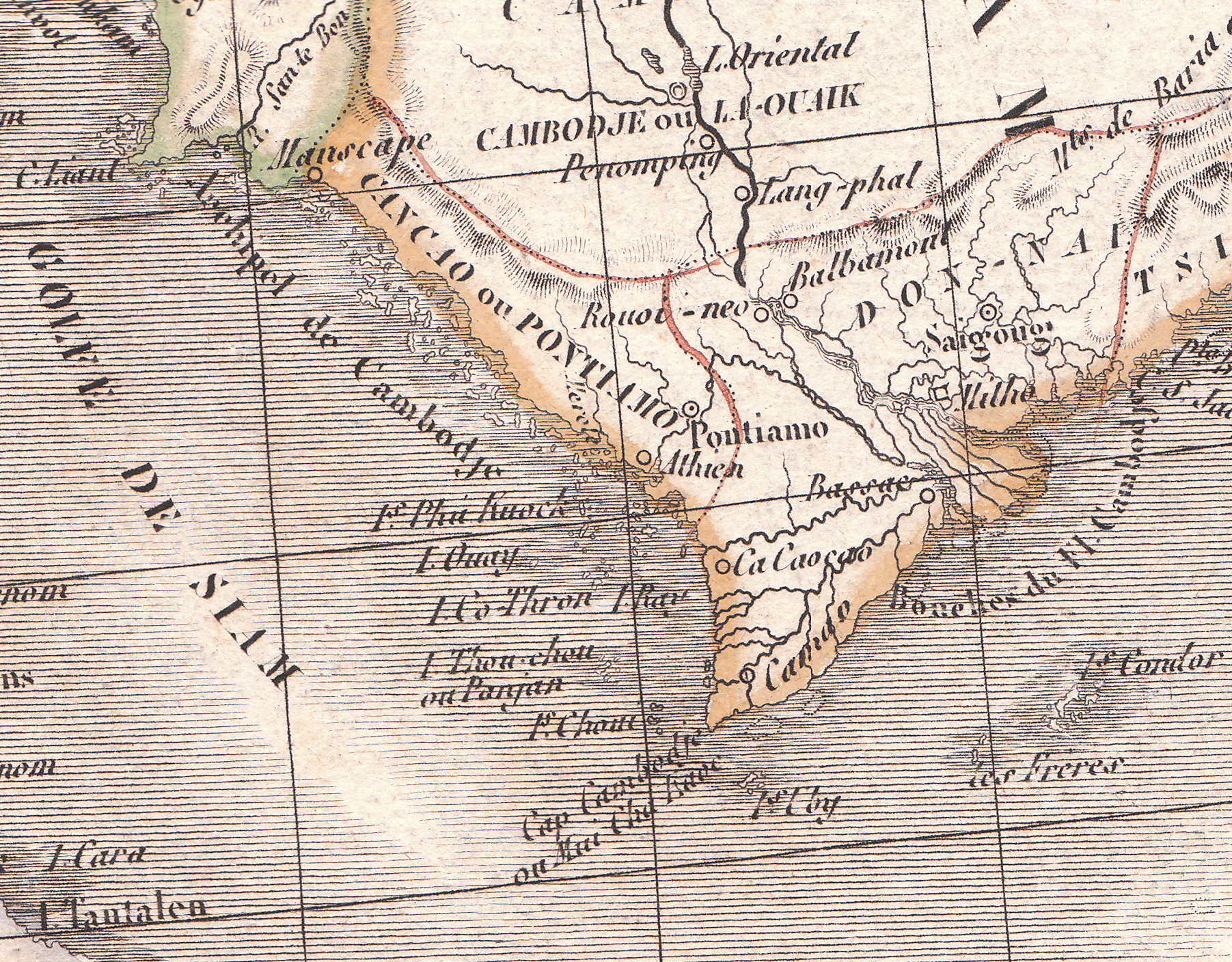
- The Principality of Hà Tiên in green Hà Tiên, on a French 1829 map, labelled "Can Cao [or] Pontiamo"
- Status: Cambodian protectorate (1707–1736); Vietnamese protectorate (1708–1832); Siamese protectorate (1785–1809)
- Capital: Hà Tiên
- Spoken languages: Chinese; Vietnamese; Khmer; Malay; Cham
- King
  - 1707–1735: Mạc Cửu (first)
  - 1735–1777: Mạc Thiên Tứ
  - 1830–1832: Mạc Công Tài (last)
- Historical era: Modern history
  - Mạc Cửu switched allegiance to the Nguyễn lords: 1707
  - Hà Tiên Province formed: 1832
| Preceded by | Succeeded by |
| Post-Angkor period | Hà Tiên province |
- Today part of: Vietnam; Cambodia

The Principality of Hà Tiên (Vietnamese: Hà Tiên trấn; chữ Hán: 河僊鎮 or 河仙鎮, Thai: เมืองพุทไธมาศ Mueang Phutthai Mat), or the Hà Tiên Protectorate, was a principality of Chinese settlers ruled by the Mạc (Mo) clan at the Gulf of Thailand, in modern-day southern Vietnam and Cambodia. It was originally de facto independent, but later became a vassal state of the Siamese Rattanakosin Kingdom and the Vietnamese Nguyễn dynasty in the 18th and 19th century prior to its annexation by the latter in 1832. Along with Phố Hiến, Hội An, and Saigon, Hà Tiên was a major Chinese community center and important hub of Ming loyalist networks in premodern Indochina.

The name of the principality was variously spelled as Hexian Zhen (河仙鎮), Nangang (南港), Gangkou (港口), Bendi (本底) or Kundama (昆大嗎) in Chinese, Phutthaimat (พุทไธมาศ) or Banthaimat (บันทายมาศ) in Thai, Ponthiamas, Pontheaymas and Pontiano in French, Panthai-mas, Bantaimas, Pontiamas, Pontaimas, Bantay-mas, Banteay M'eas, Pontiamas, Pontiamasse, Po-taimat, Can Cao, Cancar, and many other variations. Many of the pronunciations were similar to Banteay Meas, thus confusing Hà Tiên with a nearby town Banteay Meas.

== History ==
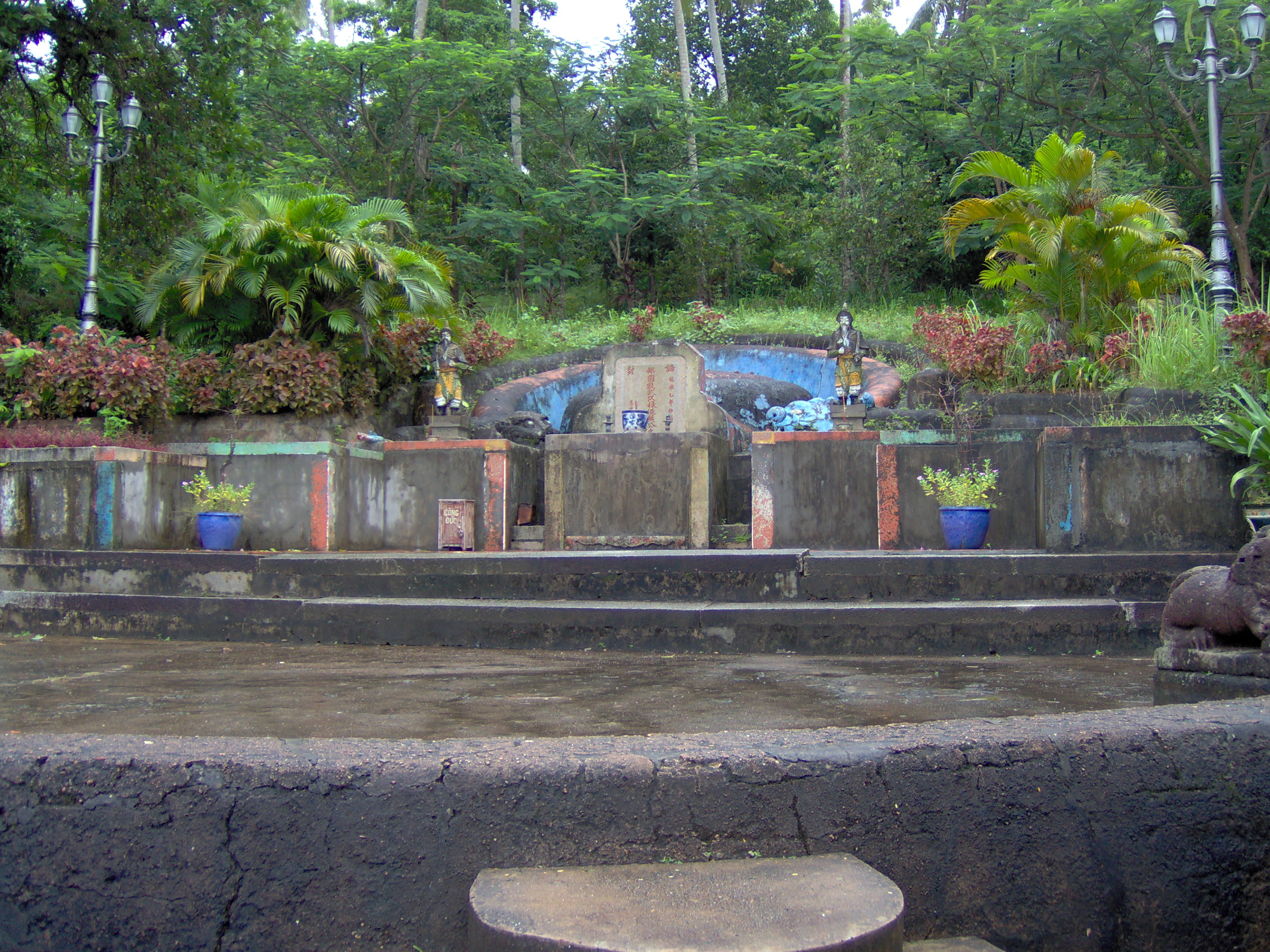
The tomb of Mạc Cửu in Ha Tien.

Hà Tiên and its nearby area had been a part of Cambodia for a long time. In the late 17th century, a Chinese refugee, Mok Kiu (the Vietnamese called him Mạc Cửu), who had fled his homeland in the Leizhou peninsula back then in 1671, was granted the Khmer title Oknha (ឧកញ៉ា, "marquess") by Cambodian king. He was allowed to build a small town composed of Chinese émigrée in the mouth of Mekong Delta. The colonial town was known as Hà Tiên in Vietnamese sources, while Cambodian called it Peam (ពាម). The area had a dual political structure: Mạc Cửu ruled Chinese and Vietnamese; while local Khmers continued to be ruled by a Khmer governor, called Oknha Reacheasetthi (ឧកញ៉ារាជាសេដ្ឋី). However, Siamese sources called the Hà Tiên rulers Phraya Rachasethi (พระยาราชาเศรษฐี), thus confusing them with the Khmer governor.

Mạc Cửu switched allegiance to the Nguyễn lords of Vietnam in 1707, just after an invasion by Siam. He received the Vietnamese rank hầu ("marquess") from the Nguyễn. Since then, the Southern Vietnamese dominion saw Hà Tiên not as an independent polity but as a vassal of them. However, as a vassal of Cambodia, Hà Tiên still paid taxes to Cambodian court.

Mạc Cửu died in 1736, his son Mạc Thiên Tứ (Mo Shilin) succeeded. A Cambodian army invaded Hà Tiên in 1739 but was utterly defeated. From then on, Cambodia did not try to resume Hà Tiên, Hà Tiên enjoyed full independence from Cambodia thereafter.

Mạc Thiên Tứ's reign saw the golden age of Hà Tiên. In 1758, Hà Tiên established Outey II as puppet king of Cambodia. After War of the second fall of Ayutthaya, Mạc Thiên Tứ tried to install Prince Chao Chui (เจ้าจุ้ย, Chiêu Thúy in Vietnamese) as the new Siamese king, but was defeated by Taksin. Hà Tiên was completely devastated by Siamese troops in 1771, Mạc Thiên Tứ had flee to Trấn Giang (modern Cần Thơ). In there, he was sheltered by Nguyễn lord. Two years later, Siamese army withdrew from Hà Tiên, and Mạc Thiên Tứ retook his principality.

After Tây Sơn rebellion broke out, Hà Tiên supported the Nguyễn. The Nguyễn regime was overthrown in 1777, Mạc Thiên Tứ refused to surrender to Tây Sơn rebels, and fled to Siam. He was thrown into prison by Taksin in 1780, his two sons and most of his wife's Vietnamese Kinh family members were executed. His other children were rescued and hid in the Siam countryside where they later assimilated into Hainan Min speaking community. In this situation, a power vacuum developed. After Rama I was crowned the new Siamese king in 1782, a Siamese general Phraya Thatsada (พระยาทัศดา, Thát Xỉ Đa in Vietnamese) was sent to capture Hà Tiên. The town was occupied by rebels but soon was captured by Nguyễn Ánh. However, Ánh had to abandon it because he was attacked by Tây Sơn army. In 1785, a Siamese army under Krom Luang Thepharirak was sent to help Nguyễn Ánh. In the same time, Mạc Tử Sinh was sent back to Hà Tiên by Rama I. When the Siamese fleet landed in Banteay Meas, an army under Mạc Tử Sinh and Phraya Thatsada was to reinforce them. However, Siamese fleet was defeated by Tây Sơn army in Battle of Rạch Gầm-Xoài Mút. Mạc Tử Sinh and Nguyễn Ánh fled to Siam.

Nguyễn Ánh returned to Vietnam and retook Gia Định (present-day Ho Chi Minh City) in 1787. In the same time, Mạc Tử Sinh was sent back to help Nguyễn Ánh. Chinese researcher Dai Kelai (戴可来) stated that Mạc Tử Sinh was probably a puppet ruler installed by Siam. Not long after Mạc Tử Sinh died, Ngô Ma (吳魔) briefly served as acting ruler. Ngô Ma was probably the same person Thông ngôn A Ma (通言阿摩, lit. "A Ma, the interpreter"), a Siamese who served as a Vietnamese interpreter during Taksin's reign.

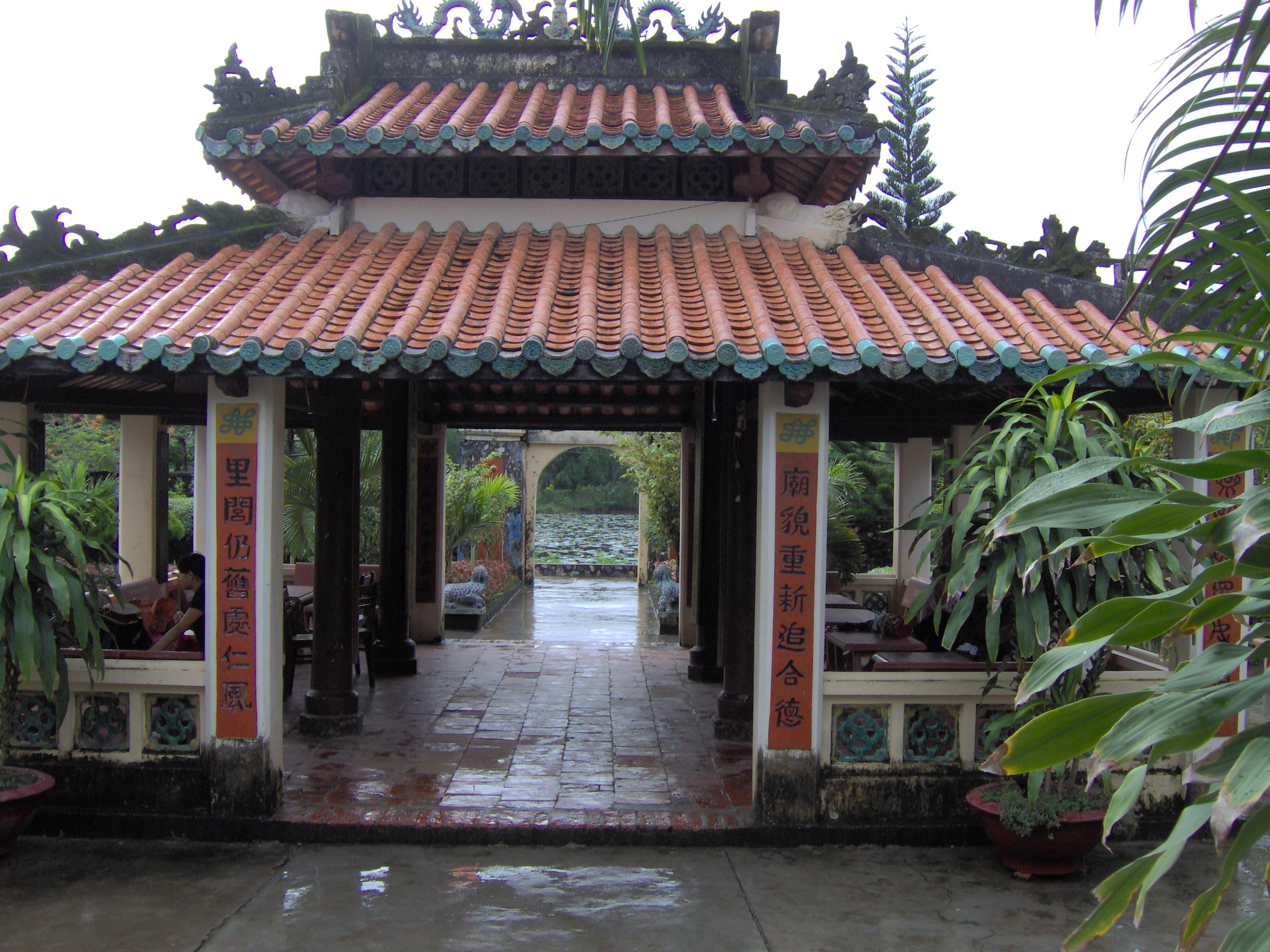
Mạc Cửu's mausoleum

Maha Sura Singhanat appointed Mạc Công Bính as the new ruler of Hà Tiên in 1789. However, when Mạc Công Bính arrived in Vietnam, Nguyễn Ánh appointed him the governor of Long Xuyên. It made Singhanat very angry, Nguyễn Ánh had to send him back to Hà Tiên. Mạc Công Bính died in 1792; two generals, Trần Hanh (陳亨) and Trần Tô (陳蘇) were appointed acting rulers by Siam.

In 1800, Mạc Tử Thiêm was appointed the new ruler by Siam, and sent back to Hà Tiên. Since 1803, Hà Tiên was subjected to the jurisdiction of the Viceroyalty of Gia Định (Gia Định Thành). Mạc Tử Thiêm went to Bangkok to attend Anurak Devesh's funeral in 1807. During his absence, Mạc Công Du was appointed the acting ruler by Nguyễn Ánh.

Mạc Tử Thiêm died in 1809. Since then, Vietnamese Nguyễn dynasty managed to appoint the ruler of Hà Tiên directly. Feared of provoking Siamese, Ngô Y Nghiễm (吳依儼) and Lê Tiến Giảng (黎進講) were appointed quyền lĩnh trấn sự (權領鎮事, "acting governor") instead of trấn thủ (鎮守, "governor"). The Vietnamese managed to eliminate the influence of Mạc family in this area.

In 1818, Mạc Công Du was appointed the ruler of Hà Tiên, however, he was only an official under Nguyễn dynasty. Mạc Công Du retired in 1829, his younger brother Mạc Công Tài succeeded. Hà Tiên trấn was disestablished in 1832. Hà Tiên Province was formed in its area.

Lê Văn Khôi revolt broke out in 1833, Mạc Công Du, Mạc Công Tài, their sons Mạc Hầu Hy (鄚侯熺) and Mạc Hầu Diệu (鄚侯耀), accepted official posts from rebels. All of them were arrested and taken to Huế. In the same year, Mạc Công Du and Mạc Công Tài died in prison. Later, Mạc Hầu Hy fled to Siam.

== List of Hà Tiên rulers ==
| Personal name | Vietnamese title | Siamese title | Khmer title | Reign | Notes |
|---|---|---|---|---|---|
| Mạc Cửu 鄚玖 | Hà Tiên trấn tổng binh Cửu Ngọc hầu (河僊鎮總兵玖玉侯) | | Oknha (ឧកញ៉ា) | 1707–1735 | |
| Mạc Thiên Tứ 鄚天賜 | Hà Tiên trấn khâm sai đô đốc Tông Đức hầu (河僊鎮欽差都督琮德侯) | Phraya Rachasethi Yuan (พระยาราชาเศรษฐี ญวน) | Preah Sotoat (ព្រះសុទត្ដ) | 1736–1771 | son of Mạc Cửu |
| Mạc Thiên Tứ | Hà Tiên trấn khâm sai đô đốc Tông Đức hầu (until 1775); Đặc tiến quốc lão Hà Tiên trấn đô đốc Tông quận công (since 1775) (特進國老河僊鎮都督琮郡公) | Phraya Rachasethi Yuan | Preah Sotoat | 1773–1777 | restore |
Interregnum (1777–1785)
| Mạc Tử Sinh 鄚子泩 | Hà Tiên lưu thủ tham tướng Lý Chánh hầu (河僊留守參將理政侯) | Phraya Rachasethi (พระยาราชาเศรษฐี) | | 1785–1788 | son of Mạc Thiên Tứ |
Interregnum, Ngô Ma as acting ruler (1788–1789)
| Mạc Công Bính 鄚公柄 | Long Xuyên lưu thủ Bính Chánh hầu (龍川留守柄正侯) | | | 1789–1792 | grandson of Mạc Thiên Tứ |
Interregnum, Trần Hanh and Trần Tô as acting rulers (1792–1800)
| Mạc Tử Thiêm 鄚子添 | Hà Tiên chánh khâm sai lưu thủ cai cơ Thiêm Lộc hầu (until 1805) (河僊正欽差留守該奇添祿侯); Hà Tiên trấn khâm sai chưởng cơ Thiêm Lộc hầu (since 1805) (河僊鎮欽差掌奇添祿侯) | Chaophraya Rottha | | 1800–1809 | son of Mạc Thiên Tứ |
Ngô Y Nghiễm and Lê Tiến Giảng as acting governors (1809–1816)
| Mạc Công Du 鄚公榆 | Hà Tiên trấn hiệp trấn Du Thành hầu (until 1818) (河僊鎮叶鎮榆成侯); Hà Tiên trấn thủ Du Thành hầu (since 1818) (河僊鎮守榆成侯) | | | 1816–1829 | grandson of Mạc Thiên Tứ |
| Mạc Công Tài 鄚公材 | Hà Tiên thủ quản thủ (河僊守管守) | | | 1830–1832 | grandson of Mạc Thiên Tứ |
