= Mạc Cửu =

Chinese exile

Mạc Cửu 鄚玖
- Cửu Ngọc hầu
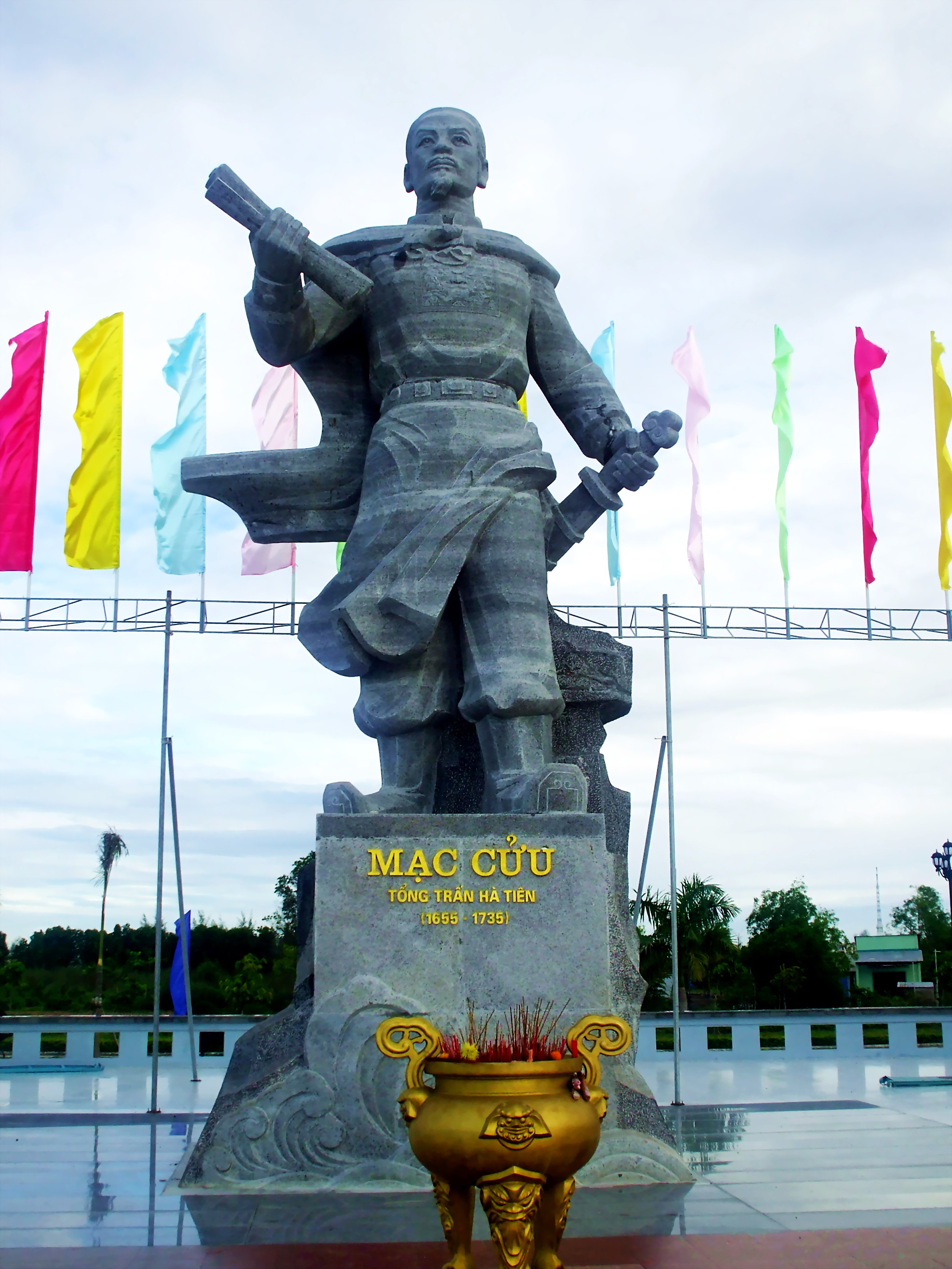
- A statue of Mạc Cửu in Hà Tiên, Vietnam

King of Hà Tiên
- Reign: 1707–July 18, 1735
- Predecessor: None (Dynasty established)
- Successor: Mạc Thiên Tứ
- Born: 1655; Leizhou Peninsula, China
- Died: July 18, 1735 (aged 79–80); Hà Tiên, Hà Tiên trấn
Names
- Mạc Kính Cửu (鄚敬玖); Mạc Cửu (鄚玖)
Regnal name
- Hà Tiên trấn Tổng binh (河僊鎮總兵); Cửu Ngọc hầu (玖玉侯)

Mạc Cửu

Chinese name
- Chinese: 鄚玖
Transcriptions
Standard Mandarin
- Hanyu Pinyin: Mò Jiǔ
Yue: Cantonese
- Yale Romanization: Mohk Gáu
Southern Min
- Hokkien POJ: Bo̍h Kiú

Vietnamese name
- Vietnamese alphabet: Mạc Cửu
- Chữ Hán: 鄚玖

Mạc Cửu (Chinese: 鄚玖; pinyin: Mò Jiǔ, chữ Hán: 鄚玖, Vietnamese: Mạc Cửu; Khmer: ម៉ាក គីវ or ម៉ាក គូ; 1655– July 18, 1735), also spelled Mok Kui, was an exile from China who founded the Principality of Hà Tiên and ruled as its first monarch. He played a role in the relations between Cambodia and the Vietnamese Nguyễn court.

He was born in Leizhou, Guangdong, then under the rule of the Southern Ming dynasty. His birth name was Mạc Kính Cửu (莫敬玖, pinyin: Mò Jìngjiǔ), which could be easily confused with several rulers of the Mạc dynasty, including Mạc Kính Chỉ, Mạc Kính Cung, Mạc Kính Khoan and Mạc Kính Vũ. Therefore, he changed his name to Mạc Cửu (鄚玖). Mạc Cửu later decided to immigrate to Vietnam to expand his business. Sometime between 1687 and 1695, the Cambodian king granted him the Khmer title Okna (ឧកញ៉ា), and sponsored him to migrate to Southern Cambodia, where he at first served as chief of a small Chinese and Vietnamese community. He built a casino there and suddenly became rich. He then attracted his other fellow Chinese and Vietnamese to resettle here, and built seven villages in Phú Quốc, Lũng Kỳ (Kep), Cần Bột (Kampot), Hương Úc (modern Sihanoukville), Giá Khê (Rạch Giá) and Cà Mau. Chinese and Vietnamese had established their own town at Hà Tiên. Hà Tiên was originally known under the Khmer ពាម name of Piem or Peam (also Pie, Pam, Bam), the Khmer for "port", "harbour" or "river mouth". It was known variously as Gangkou (港口) in Chinese, and Pontomeas by Europeans. Hà Tiên was a part of Cambodia until the year 1714. However, this area had a dual political structure: Mạc Cửu ruled over the local Chinese and Vietnamese population, while the local Khmers continued to be ruled by a Khmer governor, called Okna Reachea Setthi (ឧកញ៉ារាជាសេដ្ឋី), until the Siamese expedition of 1771 overthrew the local system of government.

Cambodia was invaded by the Siamese army, and Mạc Cửu was captured and taken to Bangkok. He had no chance to come back to Hà Tiên until civil strife broke out in Siam.

Mạc Cửu later switched his allegiance to the Nguyễn lords of Vietnam. He sent a tribute mission to the Nguyễn court in 1708, and in return received the title of Tong Binh of Hà Tiên and the noble title Marquess Cửu Ngọc (Vietnamese: Cửu Ngọc hầu). In 1715, the Cambodian king, Thommo Reachea III (Vietnamese: Nặc Ông Thâm), invaded Hà Tiên with the support of Siam in order to regain the lost territory. Mạc Cửu was defeated and fled to Lũng Kỳ (modern Kep). Cambodia sacked Hà Tiên and withdrew. Mạc Cửu returned to Hà Tiên and built several castles to defend his marquisate against attack. He died on July 16, 1735.

Mạc's son, Mạc Thiên Tứ, was born in 1718 to a lady from Biên Hòa. He also had a daughter, Mac Kim Dinh, who was married to the son of the exiled Chinese general Trần Thượng Xuyên. Mạc Cửu's descendants succeeded him as the governors of Hà Tiên until the title was abolished by the Vietnamese Nguyễn dynasty in 1832.

A genealogy of his clan is Hà Tiên trấn Hiệp trấn Mạc thị gia phả.

== Sources ==
- Coedes, George (1966), "The making of South East Asia", The Geographical Journal, vol. 132, University of California Press, p. 540, Bibcode:1966GeogJ.132..540P, doi:10.2307/1792563, ISBN 978-0-520-05061-7, JSTOR 1792563
- Cooke, Nola; Li, Tana (2004), Water frontier: commerce and the Chinese in the Lower Mekong Region, 1750-1880, Rowman & Littlefield, ISBN 978-0-7425-3083-6
- Ooi, Keat Gin (2004), "Mac Thien Tu (1780-1800)", Southeast Asia: a historical encyclopedia, from Angkor Wat to East Timor, Volume 1, ABC-CLIO, pp. 806–807, ISBN 1-57607-770-5
- Nicholas Sellers, The Princes of Hà-Tiên (1682-1867): the Last of the Philosopher-Princes and the Prelude to the French Conquest of Indochina: a Study of the Independent Rule of the Mac Dynasty in the Principality of Hà-Tiên, and the Establishment of the Empire of Vietnam, Brussels, Thanh-long, 1983.

Regnal titles
Preceded by None	Ruler of Hà Tiên; 1707–1735	Succeeded by Mạc Thiên Tứ
