= Chhouk District =

Chhouk ស្រុកឈូក
- District (srok)
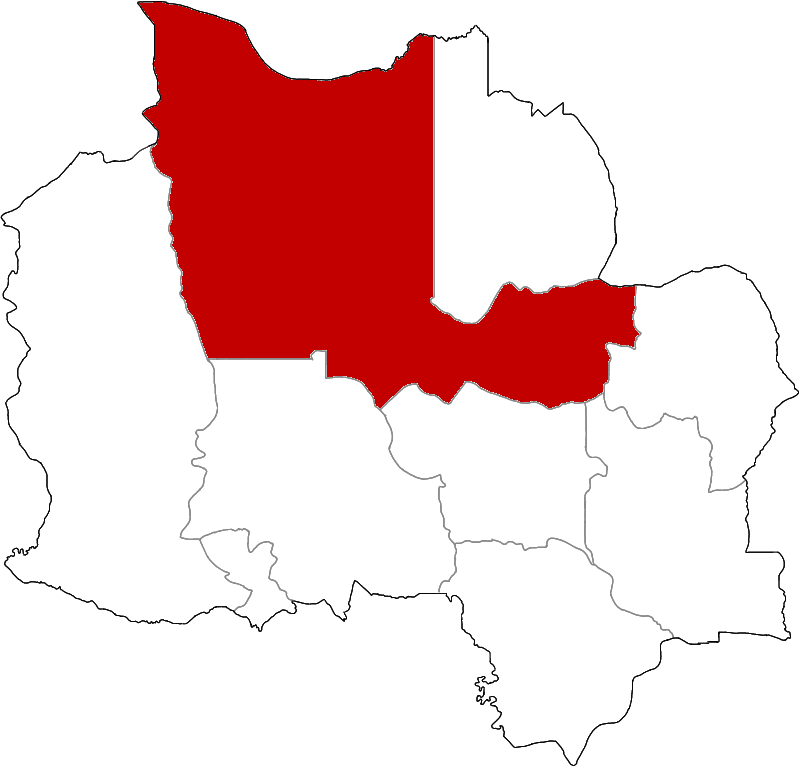
- District location in Kampot Province
- Coordinates: 10°49′N 104°27′E
- Country: Cambodia
- Province: Kampot
- Communes: 14
- Villages: 74

Population (1998)
  - Total: 78,951
- Time zone: +7
- Geocode: 0703

Chhouk (Khmer: ស្រុកឈូក) is a district located in Kampot Province, in southern Cambodia.
