= Banteay Meas District =

Banteay Meas ស្រុកបន្ទាយមាស
- District (srok)
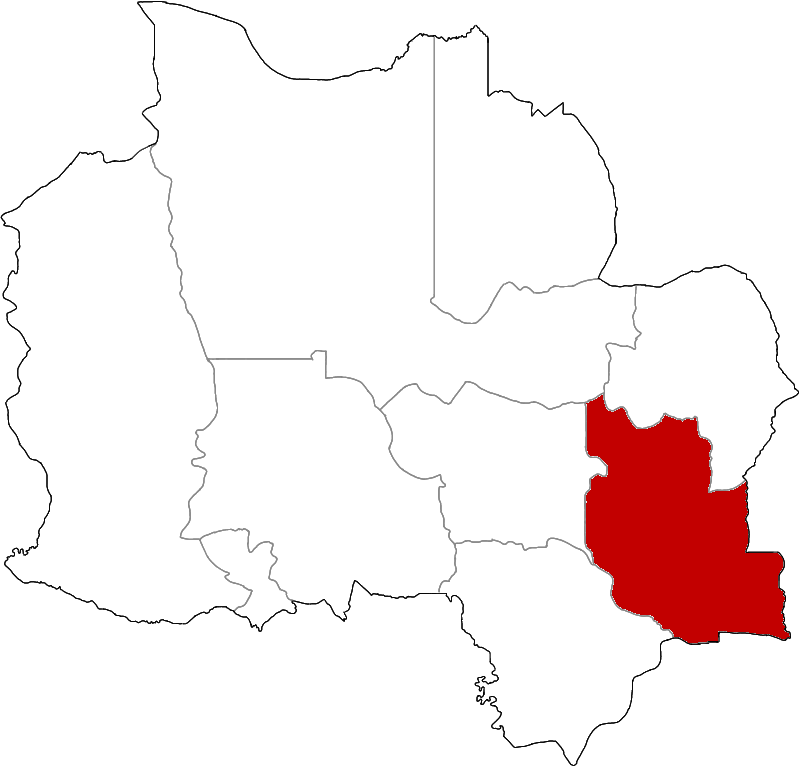
- District location in Kampot Province
- Coordinates: 10°37′N 104°32′E
- Country: Cambodia
- Province: Kampot
- Communes: 15
- Villages: 88

Population (1998)
  - Total: 81,542
- Time zone: +7
- Geocode: 0702

Banteay Meas District (Khmer: ស្រុកបន្ទាយមាស pronounced [srok ɓɑːn.tiəj.miəh]) is a district located in Kampot Province, in southern Cambodia.
