= Cambodian nationality law =

The Law on Nationality of Cambodia (Cambodian Citizenship) determines who is a citizen of Cambodia under a 1996 nationality law. Cambodian citizenship is typically acquired through ancestry (being born to at least one Khmer parent) or naturalization. Citizenship can also be applied through business investments and donations. Dual nationality is permitted, although dual nationals may be viewed as Cambodian citizens in court proceedings.

== Controversies ==
=== Dual-citizenship ===
In 2019, Reuters published an investigation that disclosed at least 8 relatives and high-ranking associates of then Cambodian Prime Minister Hun Sen, including Lau Meng Khin, Choeung Sopheap, Neth Savoeun, and Aun Pornmoniroth, had acquired Cypriot citizenship through an investment scheme. In response, Cypriot opposition parties demanded an investigation. The program was disbanded in 2020. In October 2021, the Parliament of Cambodia passed constitutional amendments that ban the prime minister and presidents of the National Assembly, Senate, and Constitutional Council from being citizens of other countries. The law was enacted in November 2021.

=== Type of application of citizenship ===
Cambodia's nationality laws enable foreigners to apply Cambodian citizenship through business investments or donations to the Cambodian government's national budget. This pathway has enabled qualified foreigners, including Angelina Jolie, to acquire Cambodian citizenship.

== Different types of applications for Cambodian citizenship ==
- By birth: If at least one of your parents is Cambodian, you're automatically a citizen. It doesn't matter where you were born.
- By investment: If you invest a big sum of money in Cambodia, you can become a citizen faster. It's not just about the money though, you need to meet some other requirements, like being healthy and having a valid passport.
- By marriage: If you marry a Cambodian citizen and your marriage lasts at least three years, you can become a citizen too. But you have to go through some legal steps.

== Acquisition of Cambodian citizenship ==
Foreigners can apply for Cambodian citizenship by naturalization, this is according to Article 7 of the Law on Nationality of Cambodia. The same law explains that naturalization is not the right of the applicant, it is only the Kingdom of Cambodia's favor to decide on the acceptance of any foreigner as a Khmer nationality. In either case, the application may be rejected by discretion. Article 8 stipulates that foreigners who can apply for naturalization must meet the following conditions.

- Must have a certificate of good manners and ethics issued by the commune chief or commune chief of their residence;
- Must have a letter of conviction stating that they have never been convicted of any crime;
- Must have a certificate stating that the person resides in the Kingdom of Cambodia and has resided for at least 7 years from the date the residence permit is issued, within the framework of the Immigration Law;
- Must be a resident of the Kingdom of Cambodia at the time of applying for naturalization;
- Must speak the Khmer language, know Khmer script, understand some Khmer history, and show clear evidence that they can live in Khmer society harmoniously;
- Must have intelligence and physical fitness that does not lead to danger or burden the nation.
