= A Cambodian Spring =

- Theatrical release poster
- Directed by: Christopher Kelly
- Produced by: Christopher Kelly
- Cinematography: Christopher Kelly
- Edited by: Christopher Kelly; Ryan Mullins; Pavel Stec
- Music by: James Holden
- Production companies: Dartmouth Films; Eye Steel Films; Little Ease Films; Zanzibar Films
- Distributed by: Dartmouth Films
- Release dates: June 2016 (Sheffield DocFest); May 2018 (UK and Ireland)
- Running time: 121 minutes
- Country: United Kingdom
- Language: English
- Box office: $19,405 (£14,068)

A Cambodian Spring is a 2016 British documentary film directed and produced by Christopher Kelly, focusing on a conflict over plans to develop the Boeung Kak lake in the Cambodian capital of Phnom Penh. The film premiered under the title The Cause of Progress at the 2016 Sheffield DocFest. It also showed at the Hot Docs festival in Toronto, Canada in May 2017. It was released theatrically in the United Kingdom and Ireland on 18 May 2018.

== Synopsis ==
The film chronicles the struggle to prevent the development of the lake by the government backed and World Bank funded Shukaku Inc., which would involve filling the lake with sand and evicting the families who live around it. Spurning the offered compensation, locals protest the development, led by three activists: the Buddhist monk The Venerable Luon Sovath, and housing activists, Toul Srey Pov and Tep Vanny.

== Critical response ==
On review aggregator website Rotten Tomatoes, the film holds an approval rating of 95% based on 20 reviews, and an average rating of 7.4/10. Writing in Time Out, Phil de Semlyen wrote "For all its sombre revelations, 'A Cambodian Spring' exudes a powerful sense of possibility.".

The film won a Special Jury Prize from the Best International Feature Documentary award jury at the 2017 Hot Docs Canadian International Documentary Festival.

It was nominated for outstanding Debut by a British, Writer, Director or Producer at the 2019 BAFTAs.

== Soundtrack ==
The soundtrack was composed by electronic music producer James Holden and released on his own Border Community label.

== See also ==
- Shukaku Inc.#Boeung Kak lake development
