= Yorm Bopha =

Cambodian land rights activist

- យ៉ម បុប្ផា
- Born: c. 1983
- Known for: activism against Boeung Kak development, 2012 imprisonment

Yorm Bopha (Khmer: យ៉ម បុប្ផា, born c. 1983) is a Cambodian land rights activist noted for her opposition to development around Boeung Kak lake. She was sentenced to three years' imprisonment for "intentional violence with aggravating circumstances" on 27 December 2012, leading several human rights groups to protest on her behalf.

== Boeung Kak project ==
In 2007, Shukaku, a company owned by a senator of the Cambodian People's Party, won a 99-year lease to develop the area around the lake. Developers began pumping sand into the lake, and in 2011, a BBC reporter described what was once Phnom Penh's biggest lake as having shrunk to "little more than a puddle". According to Amnesty International, more than 20,000 residents were displaced by the development, while benefiting only the senator and the company he owns. In 2011, the World Bank suspended aid to Cambodia until the situation was resolved.

Yorm Bopha was active in protests supporting residents' land rights. In 2012, she led a campaign for the freedom of thirteen women sentenced to prison for their role in one of the protests.

== 2012 and 2016 unjust convictions ==
On 28 December 2012, Yorm Bopha was convicted of "intentional violence with aggravating circumstances", following an incident in August of that year in which she allegedly assaulted two taxi drivers. She was arrested without arrest warrants, presentation of charges, and names of plaintiffs. She was convicted even if the initial people who said that she 'may be' the person who assaulted two taxi drivers, eventually confirmed that Bopha was not the assailant. Riot police surrounded the courthouse as she was sentenced, using electric batons to hold back protestors. Yorm Bopha later protested the judgement, saying, "This is injustice in the money-and-dollar society." Ou Virak, president of the Cambodian Center for Human Rights, stated, "I think with this case the court is trying to stop land protests."

Amnesty International called the charges "fabricated", designated her and fellow convicted activist Tim Sakmony as prisoners of conscience, and stated that the two were "being persecuted purely for their work defending the rights of those in their communities who have lost their houses through forced evictions". The World Organisation Against Torture and the International Federation for Human Rights released a joint statement calling for the pair's "immediate and unconditional release and the lift of pending charges, as their detention and judicial harassment seem to merely aim at obstructing their human rights activities and appear to be a result of them exercising their right to freedoms of expression and association".

On March 8, 2014, Bopha made a historic interview during Women's Day, saying, "I want to push Cambodian women to speak the truth. Because if we don't speak, no one will know about our problems and no one can help us. Being a vocal person I face a lot of risks, such as being murdered, or jailed, and other risks too - but these do not discourage me." On December 1, 2014, the International Federation of Human Rights released a documentary regarding the unfair imprisonment of Yorm Bopha. The documentary was highly criticized by the Cambodian government led by Hun Sen.

On June 28, 2016, Bopha was once again sentenced to three years in prison, for the same offenses that were already cleared in 2013. She was also ordered to pay the victims 10 million riel (about $2,500). No reasoning was provided in court for the verdict. Additionally, Bopha's ex-husband, Lous Sakhon, also was ordered to pay 10 million riel. E Sophors, president of the motodop group the Cambodia Confederation Development Association, said the ruling was “justice”. Environmental activist Chum Hout said, “The court in Cambodia always suppresses those who are outstanding activists, just like in the Yorm Bopha case and the three environmental activists in Koh Kong.”

== Personal life ==
Yorm Bopha was formerly married to co-activist Lours Sakhorn.
