= Vanny =

Vanny or Vannie may refer to:

- Vannie Albanese (1912–1984), American football player
- Vannie Higgins (1897–1932), New York mobster and bootlegger during Prohibition
- Vanny Reis (born 1985), Cape Verdean beauty pageant winner
- Tep Vanny (born 1980), Cambodian land rights activist and human rights defender
- Vanny, a character from the Five Nights at Freddy's video game franchise.

== See also ==
- André de Vanny (born 1984), Australian actor
