= Tep Vanny =

Cambodian human rights activist

- Born: 12 April 1980 (age 46); Phnom Penh, Cambodia
- Citizenship: Cambodian
- Organization: Boeung Kak 13
- Known for: Land rights activism and human rights defender
- Spouse: Ou Kong Chea
- Children: Ou Kong Panha, Ou Sovann Neakreach

Tep Vanny (Khmer: ទេព វន្នី; born 12 April 1980) is a prominent land rights activist and human rights defender, leader and creator of Boeung Kak 13, an activist group that has led peaceful protests since 2008 against the Cambodian government leasing land to the Shukaku corporation, which has led to the forcible eviction of almost 20,000 people in the region of Boeung Kak Lake in Phnom Penh. Her arrest and detention sparked an international campaign asking for her release.

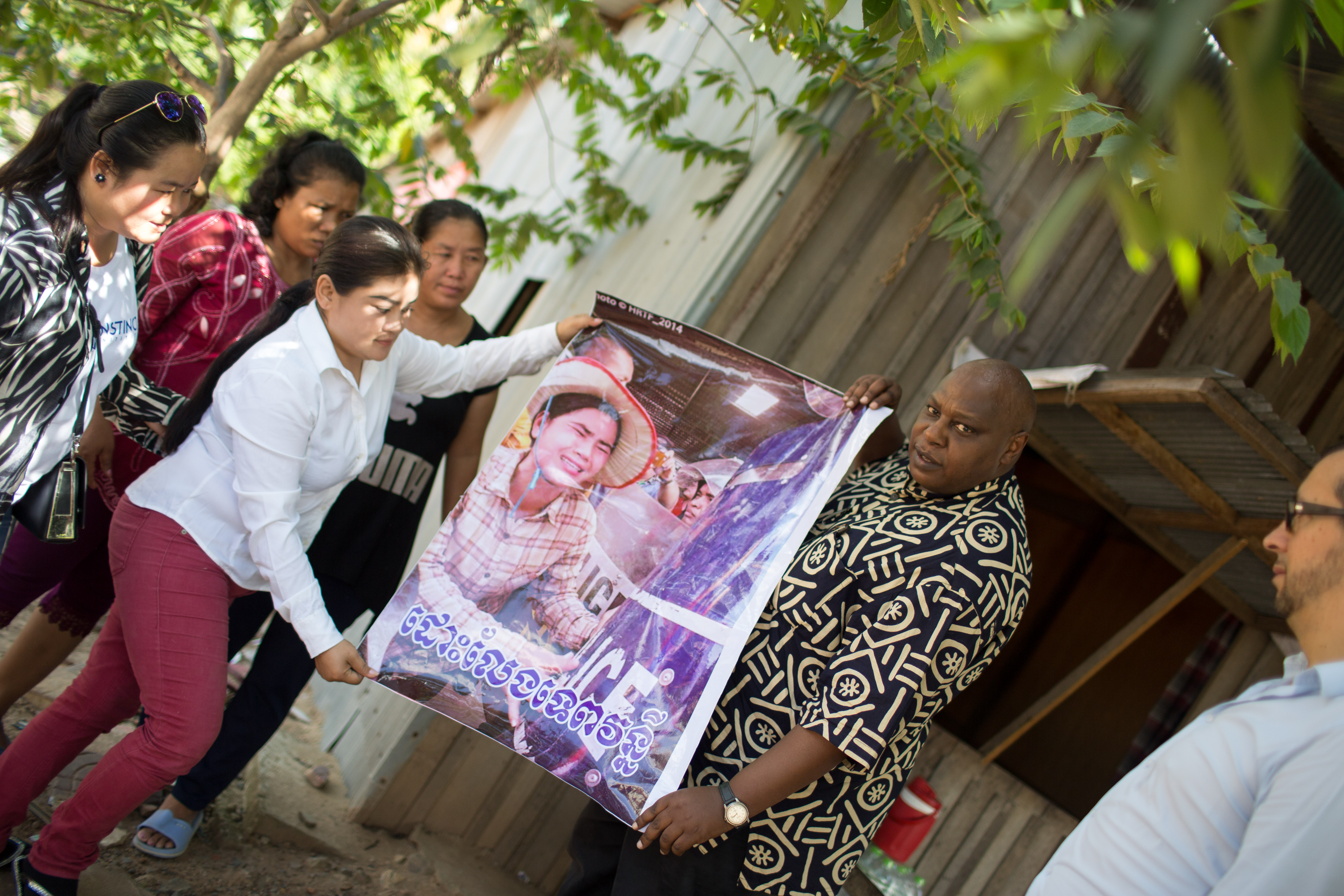
Group photo at Boeung Kak - holding a poster of their imprisoned fellow activist Tep Vanny

== Background ==
Tep Vanny originally lived in the Kandal Province before moving to Phnom Penh in 1998, where she worked as a grocery seller. Her husband Ou Kong Chea worked as a civil servant for the Ministry of defence. Together they have two children, Ou Kong Panha and Ou Sovann Neakreach. Ou Kong Chea lost his job when the couple refused to accept the buyout offer for their land in the Boueng Kak neighbourhood as they deemed to be below market value.

== Activism ==
Under the Cambodian government's Economic Land Concession (ELC) scheme which serves as the legal basis for granting land to foreign corporations, the land around Boeung Kak Lake was leased for $79m for a land development project to Shukaku Inc., owned by Lau Meng Khin, a senator for the ruling Cambodian People's Party (CPP) in partnership with the Chinese group Erdos Hongjun Investment Corporation. This action led to around 3,500 families or 17,500 people, to be forcibly evicted from their homes.

In response, local women started organizing peaceful protests on the land under the leadership of Tep Vanny. The group became known as the Boeung Kak 13 and continued to protest even after they were evicted. Thanks to their actions, they were able to draw attention to the dispute and subsequently, in 2011, the World Bank froze all lending to Cambodia. The group was arrested by the Cambodian government and on 24 May 2012, they were convicted of occupying the land illegally and sentenced to two and a half years in prison.

The arrest and subsequent imprisonment of the Boeung Kak 13 was publicized on the international stage by Amnesty International in an attempt to have their convictions overturned during an appeal hearing on the 26 June 2012.

On 15 August 2016, she was arrested for protesting the arbitrary detention of human rights defenders and sentenced to six months in prison on the grounds of “insulting a public official”. Instead of being released at the end of her sentence, the authorities reactivated an old case and sentenced her again on 23 February 2017 for “intentional violence with aggravating circumstances” under Article 218 of the Cambodian Criminal Code. She was sentenced to two years and six months in prison. Several international human rights organizations such as Amnesty International and the FIDH denounced this sentence as arbitrary detention.

In August 2018, Vanny received a royal pardon by Cambodia’s King Norodom Sihamoni on request of Prime Minister Hun Sen and was released from prison. Three of her fellow Boeung Kak 13 activists, Heng Mom, Bo Chhorvy and Kong Chantha, were also pardoned.

== International recognition ==
Tep Vanny has acted as spokeswoman for the Boeung Kak Lake community and she has given talk three times in the United States, as well as in France, Brazil, the Netherlands, Singapore and Thailand. In 2013, Tep Vanny was a recipient of the Vital Voices Global Leadership Award in a ceremony chaired by the former US secretary of State Hillary Clinton.

== Awards ==
- 2013: Vital Voices Global Leadership Award

== Documentary ==
On 11 June 2016, filmmaker Christopher Kelly released the documentary A Cambodian Spring. The footage was captured over a period of 6 years and focused on the land evictions carried out by the Cambodian government in the Boueng Kak Lake area. The film follows the actions of three Cambodian land rights activists and human rights defenders, including Tep Vanny.
