= Chinese Cambodians =

Ethnic diaspora

Chinese Cambodians Sino-Khmers
ចិនខ្មែរ/ខ្មែរកាត់ចិន 柬埔寨華人
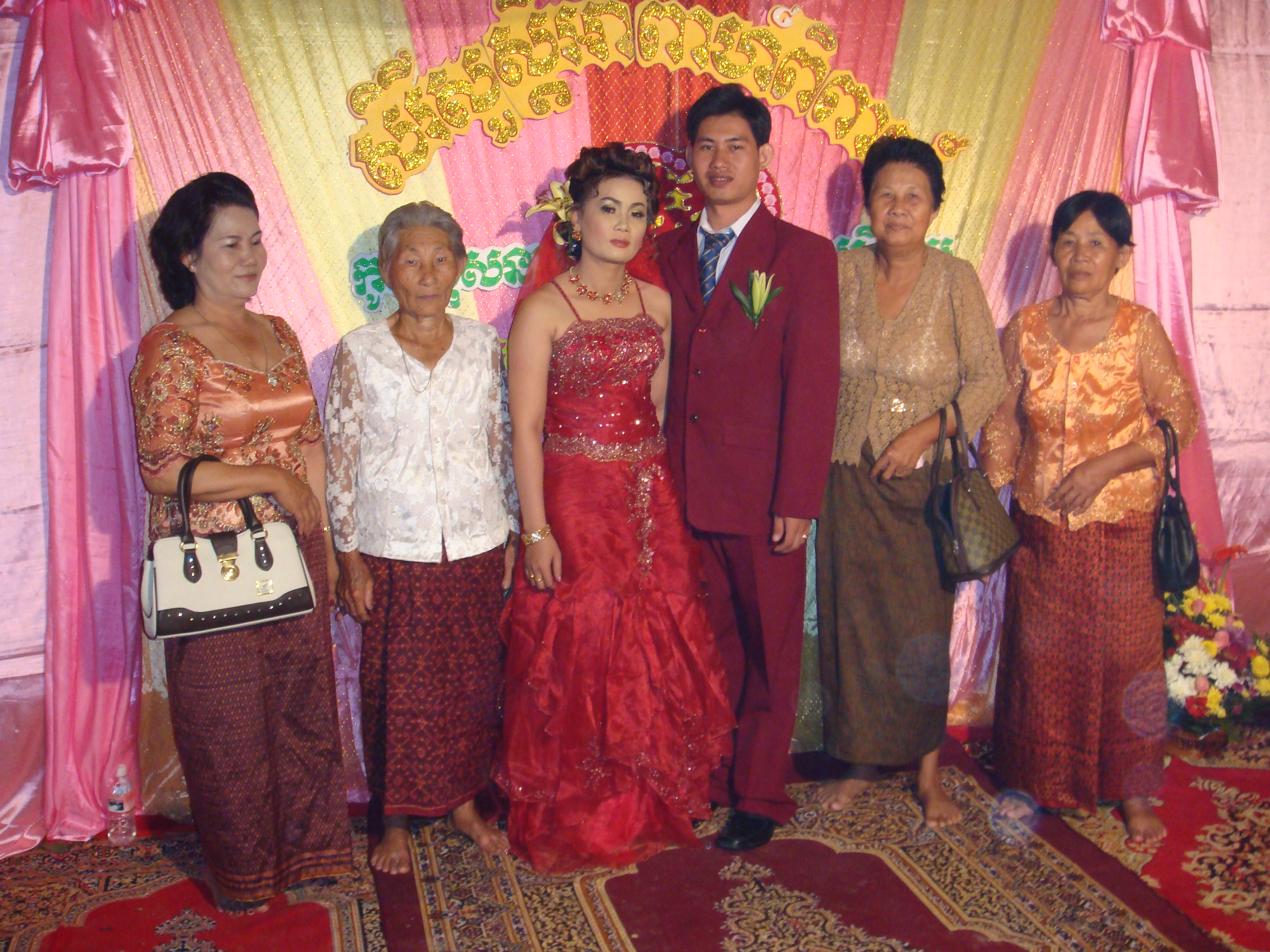
- Sino-Khmers at a wedding celebration in Kampong Thom

Total population
- 343,855–700,000 (est.)

Regions with significant populations
- Phnom Penh, Kampong Thom, Battambang, Kampot, Takeo, Banteay Meanchey, Rattanakiri, Stung Treng

Languages
- Khmer, Teochew, Cantonese, Hokkien, Hainam, Hakka, Standard Mandarin

Religion
- Chinese folk religion (Confucianism and Taoism), Mahayana Buddhism, Theravada Buddhism and significant minorities profess Christianity

Related ethnic groups
- Overseas Chinese

Chinese Cambodians (or Sino-Khmers) are Cambodian citizens of Chinese ancestry or Chinese of full or partial Khmer ancestry. The Khmer term Khmer Kat Chen (ខ្មែរកាត់ចិន) is used for people of mixed Chinese and Khmer descent; Chen Khmer (ចិនខ្មែរ) means Cambodian-born citizen with ancestry from China. The Khmer constitute the largest ethnic group in Cambodia among whom Chen means "Chinese". Contact with the Chinese people such as envoys, merchants, travelers and diplomats who regularly visited Indochina verifiably existed since the beginning of the common era. In 802 AD, Jayavarman II established the Khmer Empire (Angkor Empire) by unifying various Chenla states and declaring himself a universal monarch (chakravartin) on Mount Kulen, with Chinese historical records had tracked the region since the earlier Funan period, indicating long-standing maritime trade, cultural, and diplomatic ties with China. This marked the start of the Angkorian period, transitioning from a period of conflict to a centralized, prosperous agricultural society relying on rice cultivation. However, the earliest record of a Chinese community in Cambodia dates to the 13th century.

Chinese Cambodians also play a leading role in Cambodia's business sector and dominate the Cambodian economy today. In addition, Chinese Cambodians have a strong presence in Cambodia's political scene with many high ranking government officials and much of the country's political elite being of Chinese ancestry since the pre-Angkorian period, where Chinese traders visit the region.

== History ==
=== Early records ===
The empire succeeded earlier kingdoms, notably Funan and Chenla, with a population that included long-established Chinese and local communities. After the unification of the Khmer Empire in 802 AD, Jayavarman II’s coronation is recognized as the start of the Angkorian period (802–1431 AD), with longstanding trade routes connecting the Mekong Delta to China likely facilitated early, albeit smaller-scale, interaction with Chinese travelers or traders, predating the more substantial Chinese immigration of later periods. The earliest records of Chinese settlement dates back to the late 13th century, where a detailed and comprehensive Record of Cambodia mentions the presence of Chinese businessmen trading at Angkor. Portuguese seafarers noted the presence of a small Chinese settlement in Phnom Penh in the early 17th century. Around the same time Lim To Khieng, a Chinese privateer, stayed in Cambodia while trading and conducting raids in the South China Sea. Shortly after the fall of the Ming dynasty in 1644, Chinese troops under the command of Mac Cuu and Duong Ngan Dich encouraged large numbers of refugees from Fujian and Guangdong provinces to settle in Indochina. The majority of the immigrants were men and boys who eventually married local Khmer women. Their descendants usually assimilated smoothly into the local communities, the economic and social process and personally identified as Cambodians. However, customs were also imported, such as the practice of the Chinese topknot that was practiced until the 18th century.

Koxinga's son Zheng Jing sent a Chinese commander called Piauwja by the Dutch (Xian Biao 先彪 or Biaoye 彪爷 in Chinese) with hundreds of troops to Cambodia in February 1667 to the court of Cambodian King Paramaraja VIII. Piauwja received the title of Shahbandar of the Chinese community of Cambodia from the King. Piauwja massacred 1,000 Vietnamese men, women and children in Cambodia on behalf of the Cambodian king, who wanted to break free of Vietnamese influence. Piauwja also demanded that the Dutch pay him compensation for confiscating his ships in a naval blockade. Pieter Ketting, the Dutch East India Company's representative in Cambodia only offered to pay 1,000 taels to Piauwja when an advisor to the Cambodian King said he should pay 2,000 taels. Piauwja in response then demanded Ketting pay 6,000 taels, as compensation for a debt that another Chinese merchant working for the Dutch in Batavia owed him. Ketting refused and tried to bribe Cambodian officials to help him, but Piauwja forced Ketting to pay 4,837 taels by seizing Dutch hostages. The Schelvis, another Dutch ship arrived at Cambodian capital's shoreline on the river's mouth, but the river banks low water level rendered the range of the Dutch cannons on the ship useless. The Cambodians forbade fighting between Koxinga's forces and the Dutch on Cambodian waters, so Piaujwa instead attacked the Dutch East India company outpost on land on July 9–10, fatally wounding a Dutch surgeon and killing Ketting immediately along with 3 servants. Jacob van Wijckersloot only survived by escaping to the jungle and hiding for days before reaching the Schelvis and documenting what happened. On 28 October 1667, the Cambodian King sent a letter to the Dutch in Batavia apologising for the incident, and falsely claiming he executed Piauwja, and arrested three Dutch company employees who he said helped Piauwja against their fellow Dutch. He sent the three arrested Dutch back to Batavia, but Piauwja was in fact alive and was still working for Koxinga in the 1670s, raiding the Qing in Guangdong.

=== French rule (1867–1950) ===
The French first introduced a legislation in 1873 which classified Chinese immigrants as 'Alien Asians' and subjects were subjected to resident taxes. King Norodom introduced a legislative reform in 1884 which required the Chinese immigrants to pay higher resident taxes but there were no legal restrictions imposed for immigrants to take up Cambodian citizenship. In 1891, the French introduced a legislation first introduced by Gia Long in Cochinchina, called "bang" in Chinese. Five associations were established in Cambodia, each identified by its specific region of ancestral origin in China; Cantonese, Hokkien, Hainanese, Teochew and Hakka. Chinese immigrants were required to register with their association to settle in Cambodia. Each of these associations was led by an elected headman, who would be responsible for maintaining law, order and tax collection duties from his countrymen.

=== After independence ===
The French system of administering the Chinese Cambodian community was terminated in 1958. During the 1960s, Chinese community affairs tended to be handled, at least in Phnom Penh, by the Chinese Hospital Committee, an organization set up to fund and to administer a hospital established earlier for the Chinese community.

This committee was the largest association of Chinese merchants in the country, and it was required by the organization's constitution to include on its fifteen-member board six people from the Teochew group, three from the Cantonese, two from the Hokkien, two from the Hakka, and two from the Hainanese. The hospital board constituted the recognized leadership of Phnom Penh's Chinese community. Local Chinese school boards in the smaller cities and towns often served a similar function.

This was to be a high point in terms of the rights of the Chinese minorities. Cambodian independence in 1953 saw a regression in their treatment by state authorities and the previously existing autonomy was eliminated by the new government. However, many private associations - cultural, business-oriented and to do with education - were simply continued by the Chinese communities and clan associations themselves, as these communities still had very significant economic and political power. Anti-Chinese feeling and policies emerged, however, after the coup of 1970 which saw the establishing of a pro-West government which considered the neighbouring People's Republic of China a dangerous threat - and the Chinese minorities in Cambodia as a possible fifth column.

The year 1970 thus marks the beginning of almost two decades of severe repression of the Chinese minorities in Cambodia. It was after this point that Cambodian authorities started forcing the closure of Chinese schools and newspapers, requiring the Chinese to carry special identity papers, imposing special taxes on the Chinese and moving towards denying them Cambodian citizenship. While the Khmer Rouge regime appeared to have a more ‘tolerant' ethnic policy initially, it continued to discriminate against the Chinese once it had completed its takeover of Cambodia. The continued discrimination, however, now rested on class rather than ethnic grounds; since the majority of urban Chinese were traders, they were classified as ‘capitalists' by the revolutionary regime. While there is no evidence that the Chinese were particularly targeted in the Khmer Rouge purges, their population in Cambodia was probably reduced by half in the four years of Khmer Rouge rule; it seems that there was an increased number of anti-Chinese events just prior to the Vietnamese invasion which brought an end to the Pol Pot regime.

The establishment of the People's Republic of Kampuchea after the Vietnamese invasion in 1979 was not completely positive for the Chinese minorities. Partly because of tensions between China and Vietnam, the new Cambodian authorities adopted restrictive measures against the remaining members of the Chinese minorities, including banning them from returning to urban trades.

In 1971 the government authorized the formation of a new body, the Federated Association of Chinese of Cambodia, which was the first organization to embrace all of Cambodia's resident Chinese. According to its statutes, the federation was designed to "aid Chinese nationals in the social, cultural, public health, and medical fields," to administer the property owned jointly by the Chinese community in Phnom Penh and elsewhere, and to promote friendly relations between Cambodians and Chinese.

With leadership that could be expected to include the recognized leaders of the national Chinese community, the federation was believed likely to continue the trend, evident since the early 1960s, to transcend dialect group allegiance in many aspects of its social, political, and economic programs.

Generally, relations between the Chinese and the ethnic Khmer were good. There was some intermarriage, and a sizable proportion of the population in Cambodia was part Sino-Khmer, who were assimilated easily into either the Chinese or the Khmer community. Willmott assumes that a Sino-Khmer elite dominated commerce in Cambodia from the time of independence well into the era of the Khmer Republic.

=== Under the Khmer Rouge ===
The Khmer Rouge takeover was catastrophic for the Chinese community for several reasons. When the Khmer Rouge took over a town, they immediately disrupted the local market. According to Willmott, this disruption virtually eliminated retail trade "and the traders (almost all Chinese) became indistinguishable from the unpropertied urban classes."

The Chinese, in addition to having their livelihood eradicated on the whole, also suffered because of their socioeconomic class. They were mainly well-educated urban merchants, and thus were characteristic of the people whom the Khmer Rouge detested. Chinese refugees have reported that they shared the same brutal treatment as other urban Cambodians under the Khmer Rouge régime but they were not discriminated against as an ethnic group until after the Vietnamese invasion due to the PRC's support of the Khmer Rouge. Several of the most senior members of the Khmer Rouge were themselves of partial Chinese descent, such as Nuon Chea, Ieng Sary, Khieu Samphan, Kang Kek Iew, Son Sen, Ta Mok and even Pol Pot himself. King Sihanouk saw the delineation and repression of Chinese business and identity as nationalism emerged and the Chinese were perceived as threatening to Cambodian sovereignty. During the various regimes between 1970 and 1990, Chinese enterprise and cultural expression was completely banned and destroyed and many ethnic Chinese died or fled the country.

=== Under the PRK/SOC ===
Following the Vietnamese invasion of Cambodia, the Vietnamese installed the pro-Vietnamese People's Republic of Kampuchea regime which lifted some of the oppressive rules imposed on ethnic Chinese by the Khmer Rouge government. Chinese newspapers were allowed and the ban on speaking Chinese at home was lifted. However, partial restrictions and a certain amount of suspicion remained, for the pro-Soviet PRK regime resented China's support for the Khmer Rouge guerrillas fighting against it, now renamed as the "National Army of Democratic Kampuchea" (NADK). Observers at the time believed that the lingering anti-Chinese stance of the PRK government and of its officials in Phnom Penh made it unlikely that a Chinese community of the same scale as before the Khmer Rouge could resurface in Cambodia in the near future.

The conditions for the ethnic Chinese, however, improved greatly under the SOC, the transitional avatar of the PRK after 1989. Restrictions placed on them by the former PRK gradually disappeared. The State of Cambodia allowed ethnic Chinese to observe their particular religious customs and Chinese language schools were reopened. In 1991, two years after the SOC's foundation, the Chinese New Year was officially celebrated in Cambodia for the first time since 1975.

=== Modern years ===
Of particular note is China's economic role in the country, which encouraged Sino-Khmer businessmen to reestablish their past business which were once suppressed by the Khmer Rouge. The modern Cambodian economy is highly dependent on Sino-Khmer companies who controlled a large stake in the country's economy, and their support is enhanced by the large presence of lawmakers who are of at least part-Chinese ancestry themselves.

The Chinese language study is increasing in Phnom Penh, with the subject recently added to the national curriculum at the university level. Many Cambodians of ethnic Chinese descent learn Chinese for employment as well as business reasons due to the fact that many mainland Chinese investors are investing across the Cambodian economy.

The position of the Chinese minority has undergone a dramatic turn for the better and the Chinese seem to have regained much of their previous economic clout. For various reasons, including the growing economic collaboration between China and Cambodia and the huge investments being made by Chinese companies, the Chinese community has seen its numbers expand dramatically in the 2000s (decade). There has been a huge growth in Chinese-language schools, often generously supported by the government of China through subsidies, and also in the production of textbooks (in Chinese) that incorporate Cambodian history and seminars for teachers. There may be close to 100 such schools today (2007). One of these private schools claims to be the largest overseas Chinese school in the world, with some 10,000 students. A number of Chinese-language newspapers began to be published in the country after 1993, and state television broadcasting even included a news segment in Chinese after 1998. All of the main political parties in Cambodia now appear sensitive to the clout of the Chinese minority, publishing campaign material in Chinese in the last elections. While this minority faced serious discrimination until the 1980s, it appears that that period has come to an end and that they no longer appear to be victimized by state authorities and are allowed to prosper under Hun Sen.

== Demographics ==
According to statistics from the Ministry of Planning by the Cambodian government, approximately 15,000 individuals, or 0.1% out of the country's total population of 15 million were identified as ethnic Chinese in 2013. A year later, Chinese associations in Phnom Penh estimates that around 700,000 Cambodians have at least some Chinese ancestry. A government census done in 1962 showed that 163,000 individuals Cambodian nationals were registered as Chinese, which amounted to as much as 3% of the country's population. The ECCC had noted that then-Prince Sihanouk had estimated the Chinese population in Cambodia made up of 300,000 to 435,000 individuals in 1965, while CIA had estimated that there were about 444,000 Chinese in 1975. A university field study conducted by William Willmott in 1961 found that there were 425,000 Chinese in Cambodia, which made up to approximately 7.4% of the total population at that time. Willmott noted that there is a tendency for some Chinese who have taken up Cambodian citizenship, or Chinese descendants who have assimilated into Khmer society through intermarriages to be identified as Khmer in government censuses. During the late 1960s and early 1970s the approximately 425,000 Chinese Cambodians represented the largest ethnic minority in Cambodia. However, this number had fallen to a mere 61,400 by 1984. This rapid decline has been attributed to the accumulation of causes like warfare, economic stagnation, the Khmer Rouge era and periods of different regime caused mass-emigration.

Official censuses between 2004 and 2008 recorded that Chinese consisted of 0.3% of the country's total urban population and are concentrated mostly in Phnom Penh, while Chinese fluctuated between 0.0% and 0.1% of the country's total rural population between 2004 and 2013. The Canadian sinologist William Willmott's study of the Chinese in Cambodia's urban and rural areas in 1963 recorded that 59% of the Chinese lived in cities and towns while 41% lived in the countryside. Phnom Penh had a Chinese population of 135,000, or about one-third (33.5%) the city's total population.

== Origins ==
=== Teochew ===
The Teochew people make up the largest Chinese sub-group in Cambodia and make up about 77% of the Chinese population. About 85% of the Teochews in Cambodia came from Jieyang and Shantou in China. The earliest records of Teochew immigrants date back to the 16th century when some mutineers under the leadership of the Chinese pirate, Lim To Khieng settled in Cambodia. No significant Chinese immigration from the Chaoshan region occurred until the 1860s, and the Teochews came to Cambodia in modest numbers in the later part of the 19th century. Large-scale immigration occurred in the 1920s and 1930s, and the Teochews established themselves as the dominant Chinese sub-group thereafter. Approximately 48% of the Teochews live in rural area, and they made up about 90% of the rural Chinese population. The Teochews is also the largest sub-group in Cambodia, where some 100,000 out of 135,000 Chinese in 1962 are from this sub-group.

Teochews in rural region of the country generally make their living as village shopkeepers, rural credit moneylenders, rice merchants or as vegetable farmers. In Phnom Penh and the smaller towns, the Teochews are generally import-export Entrepot traders, pharmacists or street peddlers.

The large influx of Teochew immigrants from Thailand into Battambang resulted in the Teochews outnumbering other Chinese dialect groups in the city following its brief annexation by Thailand in 1945 that brought large numbers of Teochew immigrants to move into the city. By the 1960s, the Teochew dialect became the main language of commerce communication usage in the city.

=== Cantonese ===
The Cantonese are also known as "Chen-Kantang" in Khmer language. They made up the largest Chinese sub-group in Cambodia between the 17th century until the early 20th century and lived mainly in the city. About 40% of the Cantonese are concentrated in Phnom Penh, while most of the remainder are found in Banteay Meanchey, Battambang, Kampong Cham, Kampong Chhnang and Kratie where they make up at least 30% of the Chinese populace. About 55% of the Cantonese came from the prefectures of Dongguan, Guangzhou and Foshan in the Guangdong province of China. In the 1880s and 1890s, Chinese real estate developers of Cantonese origin secured building contracts from the French colonial government, to develop brick-and-concrete shophouses in a programme of urban renewal of modernizing Phnom Penh.

The Cantonese, who comprised the majority of Chinese Cambodians before the Teochew migrations began in the late 1930s, lived mainly in the city. Typically, the Cantonese engaged in transportation and in the skilled construction trades mainly as mechanics or carpenters.

=== Hainanese ===
More than 80 percent of the Hainanese people traced their origins from Wenchang county. They settled at an established trading settlement at Kampot province and Sihanoukville. Early Hainanese settlers started off as entrepot traders but turned to pepper trading at the end of the 18th century. They established pepper plantations in Kampot, and became the dominant Chinese sub-group in that province. Smaller Hainanese communities are also found at Sisophon and Sre Ambel.

In the 1950s, many Hainanese would then move to Phnom Penh, where, in the late 1960s, they monopolized the city's entire hotel and restaurant business. Hainanese of more humbler socioeconomic backgrounds operated tailor shops and haberdasheries. In 1957, researchers found that many Hainanese of Khmer ancestry from their Khmer mothers and Khmer grandmothers still speak Hainanese fluently.

=== Hokkien ===
The Hokkien sub-group were believed to be the earliest Chinese sub-group to settle in Cambodia. Most of the Hokkiens trace their ancestry back to Quanzhou and Xiamen prefectures in southern Fujian province.

The Hokkiens settle mainly in Phnom Penh and Battambang, and many Khmer families in Battambang claimed to have some distant Hokkien Chinese ancestry. The Hokkien community is involved the import-export shipping trade and in banking. They also comprised a large percentage of the country's richest Chinese.

=== Hakka ===
About 65% of the Hakka trace their roots back to Meizhou and Heyuan prefectures in Guangdong province.

About 70% of the Hakkas are found in Phnom Penh where they are dominant professions in the field of Traditional Chinese Medicine, and shoemaking. The Hakkas are also found in Takeo province, Stung Treng and Rattanakiri who consist of vegetable farmers and rubber plantation workers. Hakka communities in the provinces migrated to Cambodia through Tonkin and Cochinchina in the 18th and 19th centuries. In Phnom Penh, the newly arrived Hakka were typically folk dentists, sellers of traditional Chinese medicines, and shoemakers.

== Language ==
As a vast majority of ethnic Chinese emigrated from Cambodia following the Khmer Rouge, the community has assimilated greatly into Cambodian society and many now speak Khmer as their main language. As the largest group of Chinese Cambodians, Teochew is the most commonly native spoken Chinese variety. While spoken natively only by a minority of Chinese Cambodians today, Cantonese nevertheless continues to serve as the common community language among Chinese Cambodians, especially in business and due to the popularity of media from Hong Kong.

Many Chinese Cambodian families have their children learn to speak Chinese languages to reaffirm their Chinese identity. Chinese-language schools in Cambodia are typically conducted in either Cantonese or Standard Mandarin, with some teaching both variants. This is due to Chinese being viewed as increasingly the primary language of business for Overseas Chinese business communities. One main factor is due to the rise of China's global economic prominence and many Chinese Cambodian business families see Mandarin as a beneficial asset to partake economic links to conduct business between Cambodia and mainland China.

== Religion ==
Chinese Cambodians are generally practitioners of Chinese folk religion, which incorporates rituals associated with Taoism, Confucianism and Buddhism. Most Chinese families maintain a small shrine dedicated to Chinese deities, and popular choices include Lord Guan, Guan Yin, Mazu, Wang Ye and Kitchen God. During festive occasions such as Chinese New Year, Chinese Cambodians would pray at communal temples either individually or as a group. Joss sticks and paper as well as food offerings are used for prayers. On certain occasions such as funerals or fortune-telling, Chinese Cambodians would approach spirit mediums and geomancers.

A small minority of Chinese Cambodians follow mainstream Mahayana Buddhism of the Chan denomination. Chinese Cambodian families generally do not practice Theravada Buddhism and send their children to Khmer monasteries, except for those descendants who have assimilated into mainstream Khmer society. In the 1990s and 2000s, there exists a trend among assimilated Sino-Khmer silk merchants who maintain commercial links with Chinese businessmen to re-adopt Chinese cultural and religious practices. They maintain Chinese shrines in their homes and shops, and explained that the adoption of such practices is necessary to forge closer ties with Mainland and Overseas Chinese businessmen.

== Trade and industry ==
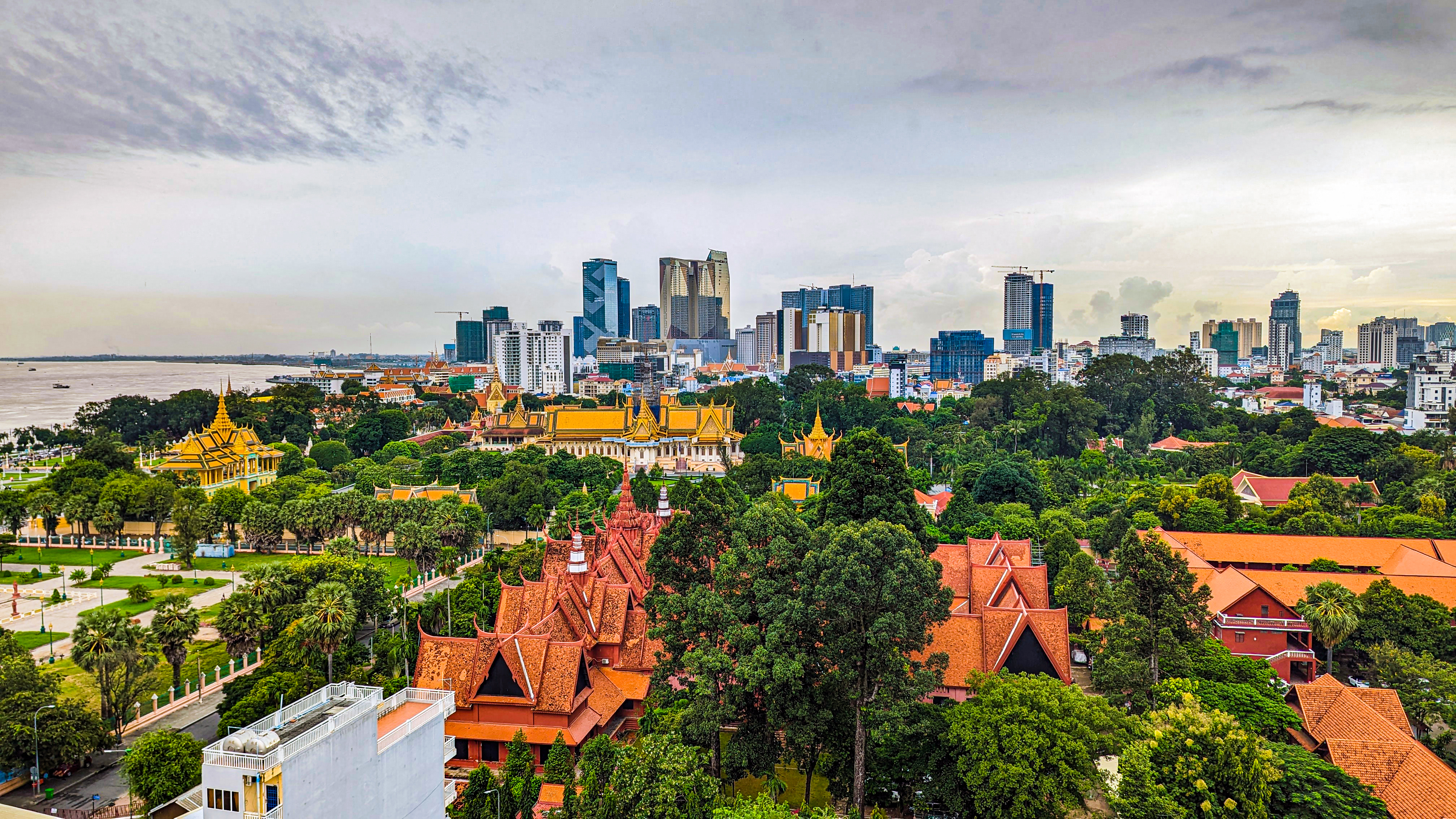
Phnom-Penh continues to be Cambodia's major financial district and business networking hub for Cambodian businessmen of Chinese ancestry. The city is now pullulated with thousands of prospering Chinese-owned businesses with most of the city's retail enterprises that have come under Chinese hands.

Like much of Southeast Asia, the Chinese dominate Cambodian commerce at every level of society. Entrepreneurial Chinese have come to contribute a large share of Cambodia's economy. The Chinese minority wield tremendous economic clout over their indigenous Khmer majority counterparts with their presence playing a critical role in maintaining the country's economic vitality and prosperity. The Chinese community is one of the most socioeconomically powerful and politically influential minority communities in Cambodia. The Chinese community dominates nearly the entirety of Cambodia's business sector and is economically prosperous relative to their small population in comparison with their indigenous Khmer counterparts. With their powerful economic prominence, the Chinese virtually make up the country's entire wealthy elite. Within Cambodia's socioeconomic backdrop, its presumed assertion as a plural society is seemingly arranged in a way where one's place in the country's economic structure is stereotypically believed to be purportedly reliant and inextricably linked to one's ethnic background. Furthermore, Cambodians of Chinese ancestry not only form a distinct ethnic community, they also form, by and large, an economic class: the commercial middle and upper class in contrast to the poorer indigenous Khmer majority working and underclass counterparts around them, whom have traditionally looked down on commerce.

The Chinese have played a prominent role in Cambodian business and industry as their economic dominance of Cambodia dates back to the pre-French colonial kingdoms where Chinese merchant traders often maintained patron-client relationships with the Khmer monarchy. William Willmot, a sinologist at the University of British Columbia estimated that 90 percent of the Chinese Cambodian community were involved in some form of commerce in 1963. Taking on and playing a crucial economic role in the country, the Chinese control almost all of Cambodia's internal trade and a substantial portion of the manufacturing including the nation's rice-milling and transportation sectors. Today, an estimated 60 percent are Chinese Cambodian urban dwellers engaging in commerce while the rest of the rural population work as shopkeepers, processors of food products (such as rice, palm sugar, fruit, and fish), and moneylenders. Throughout Cambodian cities, Chinese dominated numerous industries such as retail, hospitality, export-import trade, light, food processing, soft drinks, printing, and machine shops. In the rural areas of Cambodia, Cambodian businessmen of Chinese ancestry operated general shops that provided the indigenous Khmer peasants with essential purchases such as farming supplies, groceries imported from China, sampots and sarongs, bamboo baskets, perfume, kerosene for lamps, alcohol as well as tobacco. Those in the Kampot Province and parts of Kaoh Kong Province cultivate black pepper and fruit (especially rambutans, durians, and coconuts). Additionally, rural Chinese Cambodians also engaged in saltwater fishing. In the 19th century, the French allowed Chinese-owned businesses to flourish due to their laissez-faire capitalist policies. Willmott also estimated that the Chinese community controlled 92 percent of the Cambodian economy by the mid-20th century. Cambodians of Chinese ancestry traded in urban areas and worked as shopkeepers, moneylenders, and traditional healers in the rural areas, while Chinese farmers controlled Cambodia's lucrative Kampot pepper industry. Chinese Cambodian moneylenders also wielded considerable economic power over the poorer indigenous Khmer peasants through usury at an interest rate of 10 to 20 percent per month. This might have been the reason why 75 percent of the peasants in Cambodia were in debt in 1952, according to the Australian Colonial Credit Office. Cambodian entrepreneurs of Chinese ancestry are also estimated to control 70 percent of the industrial investment and are actively engaged in trading, real estate development, construction, small-scale manufacturing, alcohol distilling, hospitality, fast food restaurants, and food processing. The Chinese also dominate the Cambodian silk weaving industry where key commercial positions in the Cambodian silk trading networks are completely held in Chinese hands.

Cambodia's rice milling industry has completely been under Chinese hands as they wield a complete monopoly over Cambodia's rice distilling industry. At the turn of the 20th century, all of Cambodia's rice mills were completely controlled by the Chinese with Chinese rice merchants being responsible for the nation's entire export of rice. Hierarchies of rice mills were established ranging from the small humble rural rice dealer all the way to the colossal Cholon-style rice mills. Many Cambodian shopkeepers of Chinese ancestry also mixed and diversified other goods and services of value such as lending money and retailing manufactured goods alongside rice trading. Despite constituting less than 1 percent of the overall population of Cambodia, Cambodians of Chinese ancestry are estimated to control 70 percent of the publicly listed companies by market capitalization on the Cambodian stock exchange. Of the 346 shipping firms listed in the 1963 issue of the Chinese Commercial Annual, a minimum of 267 or 78 percent were owned by Cambodians of Chinese ancestry with the eight of the top ten businesses being owned by them as well. The remainder were either owned by the French or state-owned but economic preponderance prompted Chinese Cambodian businessmen to act as financial intermediaries and operating as agents for the French as well as their own. In addition, Chinese investment in Cambodia was second to the French prior to the Second World War. 95 percent of the internal trade was also under the control of the Chinese. Of the 3349 industrial firms listed by the Cambodian Ministry of Industry in 1961, 3300 or 99 percent were controlled by the Chinese with the rest being either state-owned or by French interests. Chinese representation of the 3300 industrial firms also made up 90 percent of the private investment in the aggregate. Industrial firms ranged from artisan workshops, small scale manufacturing, food processing, and beverage manufacturing and retailing, in addition to the primary processing of sawmilling, rice milling, sugar refining, and charcoal burning. Following the era of post-colonial French rule, the Chinese retained their commercial dominance throughout Cambodia's economy throughout the reign of King Sihanouk (1953–1970). In the city of Phnom Penh, a third of the total population was of Chinese ancestry numbering some 135,000 people who made their living as shoemakers, dentists, cinema owners, barbers, bakers, carpenters, and dentists. Much of the Chinese Cambodian business community mingled amongst themselves along the lines of dialect and ethnicity as the community cohered together based on ethnic and familial relations when it came to pursuing capital, organizing labour, and carving out their own unique economic niches in various trades. In the countryside and rural areas, the Chinese produced cash crops such as pepper and vegetables and Chinese merchants purchased surplus rice, peddled commodities, and bestowed loans to Khmer peasants who were in need of credit. Chinese entrepreneurs were also able to secure contracts from the Khmer royal family, where they were granted access to vast kinship networks to marshal investment capital and shore up credit and loans as well as given privileges to operate gambling dens, opium farms, pawn brokerage houses, and fisheries throughout the country. The Cantonese held extensive control on the rice, pepper, and salt trade and the Teochew dominated the wholesale and retail trade, exerted an enormous clout on the Cambodian economy during the post-colonial era. Since 1995, Cambodians of Chinese ancestry have reestablished themselves as the nation's dominant economic power players since the fall of the Khmer Rouge by controlling Cambodia's entire import-export shipping, banking, hotel, gold and rice trading, garment, industrial manufacturing, and real estate industries. Market reforms during the mid-1980s has attracted a large contingent of wealthy Overseas Chinese entrepreneurs and investors looking to exploit opportunities in Cambodian property development and general trading sectors.

Cambodians of Chinese ancestry are responsible for pioneering the development of Cambodia's entire small, medium, and large enterprise sector as the Chinese community were the key masterminds behind the establishment of all of Cambodia's trading cooperatives, production houses, restaurants, and retailers, in addition to being at the forefront of virtually all of the country's politically well-connected business groups. Utilizing the bamboo network business model, Chinese-owned businesses operating in Cambodia are structured as family businesses, trust-based networks, and patronage arrangements with a centralized bureaucracy. Moreover, social mechanisms that underpin these entrepreneurial trajectories largely derive from family, ethnic, cultural, and patron-client ties based on personalized and informal trust. In addition, Confucian Chinese business practices are employed along with societal discourses that stereotypically link “Chineseness” with socioeconomic success which is omnipresent in contemporary Cambodia. For Phnom Penh's small and medium business community, potential incoming clientele amongst newly acclimated Chinese migrants, raw materials, machinery, consumer goods, and investment capital from Greater China have served as indispensable means for many of the owners who are of Chinese ancestry saw an unprecedented expansion of their business activities. Moreover, the export of Cambodian timber, cash crops, alongside the inflow of Chinese investment have created auspicious conditions ripe with business opportunities manifesting in the form of real estate, energy, and construction ventures for budding Cambodian entrepreneurs and investors of Chinese ancestry to capitalize on. Cambodian entrepreneurs and investors of Chinese ancestry continue to remain the driving impetus behind the modern Cambodian economy with many of them having extended family members and relatives working in the Cambodian government through political connections and business networks in the Cambodia Chamber of Commerce, which is predominantly comprised up of people entirely of Chinese ancestry themselves. Entrepreneurial networks, Chinese family clan associations, Chambers of Commerce with business resources are found across the country to assist budding Cambodian entrepreneurs of Chinese ancestry. Furthermore, the opening up of China's global prominence in the world economy has induced the resurrection of ties between Cambodians of Chinese ancestry and their ancestral homeland in mainland China.

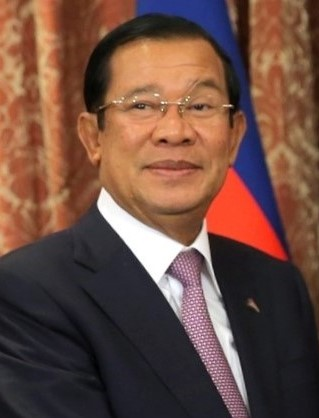
Hun Sen, who is of Chinese ancestry himself, has instituted a pragmatic, capitalist-oriented vision of rebuilding Cambodia with an impetus for attracting an influx of foreign capital investment, particularly from mainland China.

Today, Cambodians of Chinese ancestry are now at the forefront of opening up the country's economy as an international Overseas Chinese economic outpost. Much of the foreign investment now entering Cambodia is being channeled through Overseas Chinese bamboo networks. Many members of the Chinese Cambodian business community often act as agents for expatriate Mainland and Overseas Chinese financiers and investors outside of Cambodia. Of particular note is mainland China's economic role in the country, which has emerged to become a dominant foreign economic power player in Cambodia. China's source of external influence in the Cambodian economy has encouraged Cambodian businessmen of Chinese ancestry to reestablish and regain their past businesses and regain their lost property which was once confiscated by the Khmer Rouge. The modern Cambodian business sector is highly dependent on Chinese-owned companies who control virtually the country's entire economy with their augmented patronage being enhanced by the larger presence of lawmakers and politicians who are of at least part-Chinese ancestry themselves. Cambodia's lack of an indigenous Khmer commercial culture in the private sector that is dominated entirely by Cambodians of Chinese ancestry, has encouraged a plethora of mainland Chinese foreign investment capital into the country. From 1994 to July 2011, mainland China invested more than US$8.8 billion across the country. The Cambodian government has made efforts to attract hundreds of millions of dollars in investments from mainland China and Overseas Chinese financiers and investors as well as marketing the nation's tourism industry to potential mainland Chinese clientele. In addition, mainland Chinese expatriate entrepreneurs and investors have been coming to Cambodia in droves to acquire Cambodian assets and have invested substantial amounts of capital in numerous industries across the Cambodian economy, channelling their financial capital through the bamboo network. The Cambodian Chinese business community has been backed by the Cambodian political elite as much of the country's economic vitality depends on Overseas Chinese entrepreneurs and investors and the pouring of mainland Chinese investment capital for job creation, which has also added to the globalized aggregate value-added investment chain in the country. The CPP itself has incorporated many members of Chinese ancestry themselves who provide financial support to the party with many high government officials and other major political decision-makers being of partial Chinese ancestry themselves. The position of the Chinese minority in Cambodia has undergone a dramatic turn for the better and the Chinese seem to have regained much of their previous economic clout prior to the establishment of the Khmer Rouge. The influx of Chinese capital into Cambodia's economy has also led to a resurgence of Chinese cultural pride among the Chinese Cambodian community while concurrently creating new jobs and fostering new economic niches. Following the transition of Cambodia from socialism to market-driven state-owned capitalist principles, Cambodia's Chinese community began to reassert their cultural identity and economic clout. This reassertion of Chinese identity has blossomed into confident displays of Han Chinese ethnic pride following the influx of mainland Chinese investment into Cambodia. Since 1990, Cambodia has witnessed a rebirth of Han Chinese identity, cultural expression, and business boom across the country. Regional trade networks were restored and small and medium-sized businesses have flourished since the introduction of market-driven state-owned capitalist principles. The growing economic collaboration between China and Cambodia and the huge investments being made by the Chinese Cambodian business community, Overseas Chinese, and mainland Chinese companies in the country have led the Chinese Cambodian community to see its numbers expand dramatically since the turn of the 21st century.

The 21st-century Chinese Cambodian community remains a modern well established commercial middle and upper-class group. The Chinese community remains an insular and tight-knit group that has integrated well into domestic Cambodian society, yet continue to remain a major driving force behind much of the significant clout and influence that they exert contemporary Cambodia's economic and political life, with stereotypical tropes cropping up adumbrating socioeconomic success and extreme wealth. As Chinese economic might in the country grew, Cambodian hill tribes and Khmer aborigines were gradually driven out into poorer land on the hills, and onto the rural outskirts of major Cambodian cities or into the mountains. The increased resurgence of Chinese cultural and economic activity in 21st-century Cambodia has triggered distrust, resentment, and anti-Chinese sentiment among the poorer indigenous Khmer majority, many of whom eke out a rudimentary daily living engaging in rural agrarian rice peasantry or fishing in stark socioeconomic contrast to their modern, wealthier, and cosmopolitan middle-class Chinese counterparts.

== Notable Chinese Cambodians or Cambodians of Chinese descent ==
Of at least partial Chinese descent

=== Politics ===
- President Cheng Heng: 1st President of Cambodia
- Pol Pot: Communist Politician and Dictator of Democratic Kampuchea
- Lon Nol: Former President of the Khmer Republic and its Prime Minister
- So Khun: Minister of Posts and Telecommunication
- Kang Kek Iew: Communist Politician, member of the Khmer Rouge
- Khy Taing Lim: Minister for Public Works and Transport
- Chan Sarun: Minister of Agriculture, Forestry and Fisheries
- Hok Lundy: Governor of Phnom Penh, Governor of Svay Rieng
- Hou Yuon: Communist Politician
- Ta Mok: Politician and Military Chief of the National Army of Democratic Kampuchea
- Sok An: Deputy Prime Minister, Minister in Charge of the Office of the Council of Ministers
- So Khun: Former Minister of Posts and Telecommunication
- Hong Sun Huot: Minister of Health and Chairman of the National AIDS Authority
- Cham Prasidh: Minister of Commerce, Ministry of Industry, Mines, and Energy
- Nuon Chea: Communist Politician, former Prime Minister of Democratic Kampuchea
- Ieng Sary: Former Foreign Minister of Democratic Kampuchea
- Khieu Samphan: Communist Politician and Economist, former chairman of the state presidium of Democratic Kampuchea
- Hun Sen: Prime Minister of Cambodia
- Hun Manet: Prime Minister of Cambodia
- Heng Pov: police commissioner of Phnom Penh
- Ly Yong Phat: senator and businessman
- Lau Meng Khin: senator and conglomerate
- Kok An: senator and businessman
- Hong Lim: Australian Politician

=== Business ===
- Ted Ngoy: Cambodian-American Businessman
- Teng Bunma: one of the wealthiest Businessmen of Cambodia
- Pung Kheav Se: Banker and founder Canadia Bank
- Kith Meng: CEO of The Royal Group
- Choeung Sopheap: businesswoman

=== Sports ===
- Keo Sokngon: manager of the Cambodian Premier League
- Keo Sokpheng: footballer and winger
- Cheng Meng: footballer for the Visakha
- Eh Phouthong: professional pradal serey kickboxer

=== Entertainment ===
- Ellen Wong - actress
- François Chau - actor
- Haing S. Ngor - actor
- Hong Khaou: British film director

== See also ==
- Sino-Cambodian relations
