= Minh Hương =

Group of ethnic Chinese

Minh Hương people Người Minh Hương 𠊛明鄉
Total population
- Uncountable as most of their descendants have assimilated into Vietnamese society and self-identify solely as Vietnamese

Regions with significant populations
- Vietnam: Unreported

Languages
- Vietnamese, also used various Chinese languages in the past

Religion
- Predominantly Chinese and Vietnamese folk religion syncretized with Mahayana Buddhism.

Related ethnic groups
- Kinh people, Hoa people, Khmer people and Ngái people

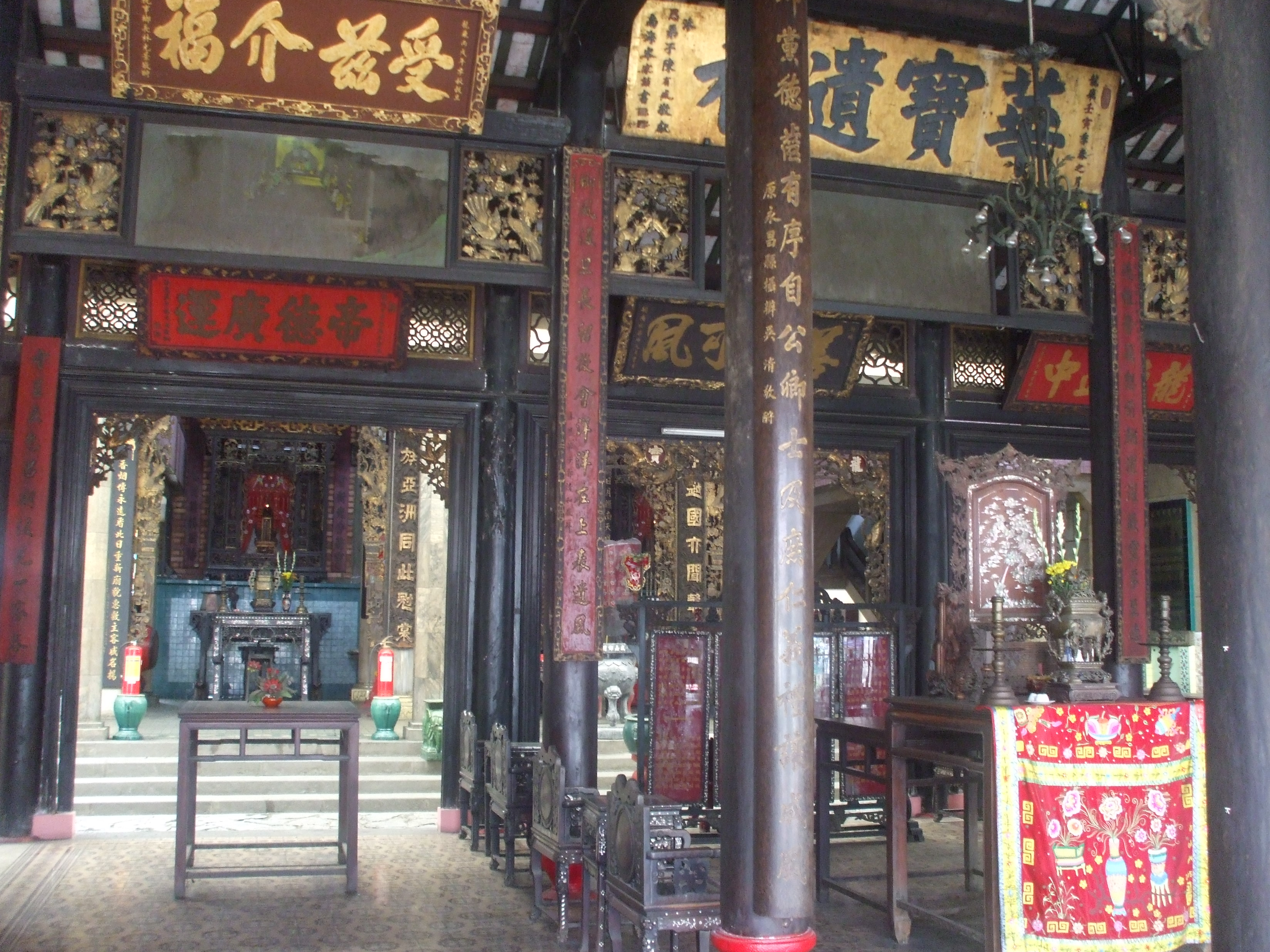
Interior of Minh Hương Gia Thạnh Hall (明鄉嘉盛會館 "Ming dynasty Assembly Hall"), a temple established in 1789 by the Minh Hương

Minh Hương ( chữ Hán: 明鄉 or 明香) refers to descendants of Ming dynasty immigrants who settled in southern Vietnam during the 16th and 18th centuries. They were among the first wave of ethnic Han who came to southern Vietnam.

== History ==
Ming refugees of Han ethnicity numbering 3,000 came to Vietnam at the end of the Ming dynasty. They opposed the Qing dynasty and were fiercely loyal to the Ming dynasty. Vietnamese women married these Han refugees since most of them were soldiers and single men. Their descendants became known as Minh Hương and they strongly identified as Han despite influence from Vietnamese mothers. They did not wear the Manchu hairstyle unlike later Han migrants to Vietnam during the Qing dynasty.

After the Qing conquest of China proper, many Han people who refused to submit themselves to the Qing fled abroad. Ethnic Han leaders such as Mạc Cửu, Trần Thượng Xuyên and Dương Ngạn Địch arrived in the Mekong Delta where they established their own polities in Hà Tiên, Biên Hòa and Mỹ Tho. They later submitted to the Nguyễn lords, who provided them with noble titles and the offer of protection against Khmer and Siam threats. Many Minh Hương such as Trịnh Hoài Đức and Ngô Nhân Tịnh became Nguyen ministers and played important roles in the Vietnamese exploration and settlement of Mekong Delta.

Originally, the Chinese characters used to refer to them was 明香 ("those who worship Ming dynasty ancestrals"). It was changed to 明鄉 ("of Ming dynasty origins") in 1827 as ordered by the Minh Mạng Emperor of Nguyễn dynasty. In official records of Nguyễn dynasty, they were called Minh nhân (明人) or Minh Hương to distinguish with those ethnic Han (Thanh nhân 清人) from Qing China.

Minh Hương often married with local Viet (Kinh) people. Since 1829, the Minh Hương were treated as Vietnamese instead of Han. They were not allowed to go to China, and also not allowed to wear the Manchu queue.

In the present day, most of the Minh Hương have adopted Vietnamese culture. Unlike later waves of Han Chinese immigration, they are regarded as Kinh people instead of Hoa people by the Vietnamese government. In addition, they overwhelmingly self-identify solely as Kinh people.

== Culture ==
=== Famous persons ===
- Dương Ngạn Địch (楊彥迪): general of Nguyễn lord, ruler of Biên Hòa.
- Trần Thượng Xuyên (陳上川): general of Nguyễn lord, ruler of Mỹ Tho.
- Trần Đại Định (陳大定): general of Nguyễn lord
- Trần Đại Lực (陳大力): general of Nguyễn lord
- Mạc Cửu (鄚玖): founding ruler of the Principality of Hà Tiên
- Mạc Thiên Tứ (鄚天賜): ruler of the Principality of Hà Tiên
- Mạc Tử Sanh (鄚子泩): general of Nguyễn lord
- Võ Trường Toản (武長纘): scholar in 18th century
- Trịnh Hoài Đức (鄭懷德): mandarin and scholar during Gia Long's reign
- Ngô Nhân Tịnh (吳仁靜): mandarin and scholar during Gia Long's reign
- Phan Thanh Giản (潘清簡): mandarin during Tự Đức's reign
- Trần Tiễn Thành (陳踐誠): mandarin during Tự Đức's reign

== See also ==
- Chinese people in Vietnam
- Peranakan
- Sangley
- Thirty-six families from Min
