= Trần Thượng Xuyên =

Chinese general during the Ming dynasty

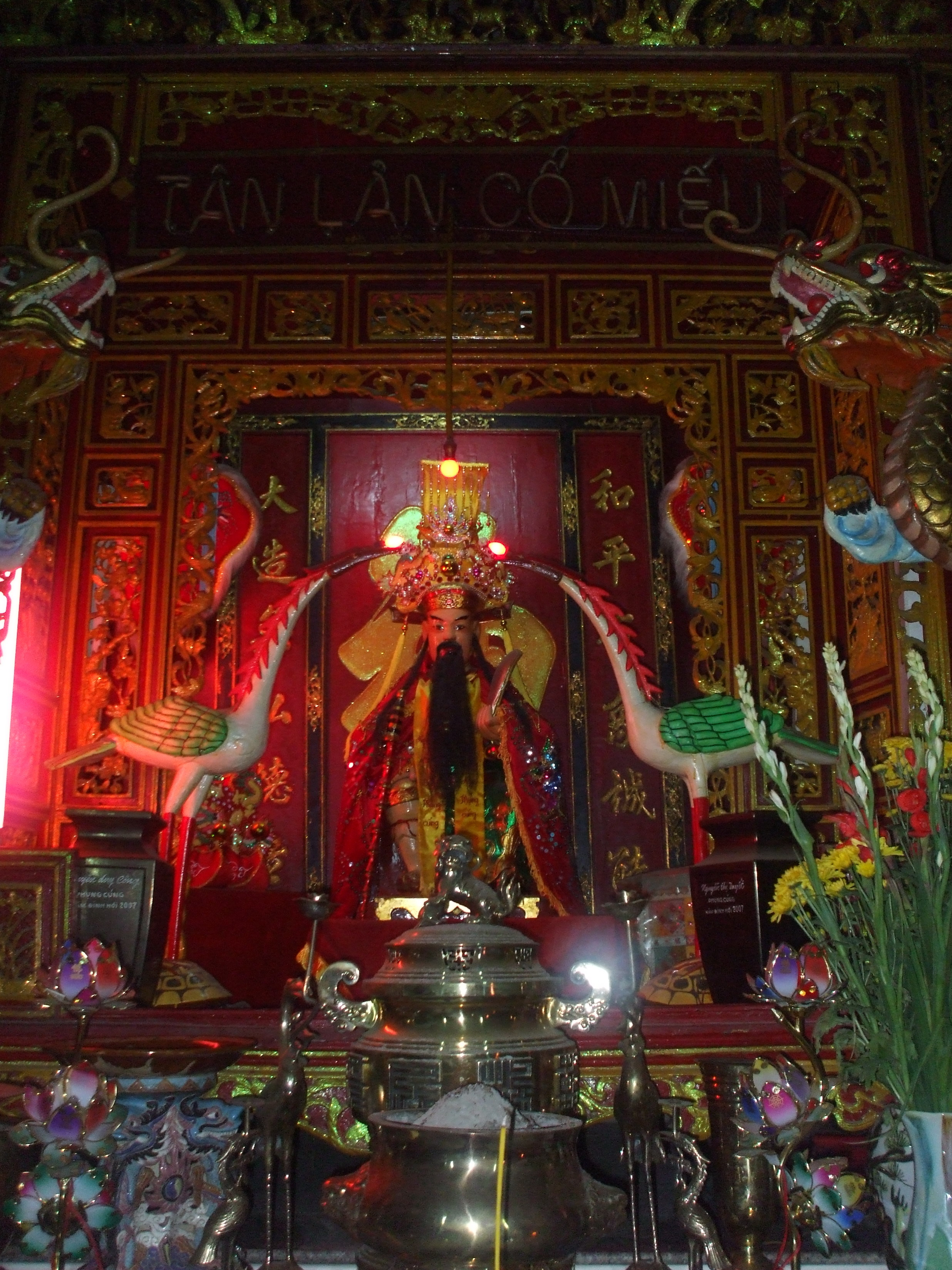
Trần Thượng Xuyên

Trần Thượng Xuyên (Chen Shangchuan, chữ Hán: 陳上川, 1626–1720) was a Chinese exile.

Trần Thượng Xuyên was born in Wuchuan, Guangdong, he was a general of Ming China, and swore allegiance to Zhu Youlang. After the execution of Zhu Youlang, he swore allegiance to Koxinga, and was promoted to Chief Commander of Gaozhou, Lianzhou and Leizhou (高廉雷總兵).

In 1679, after the Revolt of the Three Feudatories was put down by Qing dynasty, he led 3000 soldiers and 50 ships came to Đà Nẵng together with Trần An Bình (陳安平), Dương Ngạn Địch, Hoàng Tiến (黃進), and surrendered to Nguyễn lord. Trần Thượng Xuyên and Trần An Bình were sponsored to Đông Phố (modern Biên Hòa) by Nguyễn Phúc Tần, where Xuyên served as chief of a small Chinese community.

Cambodian king Chey Chettha IV (Nặc Ông Thu) revolted against the Nguyễn lord in 1699. When Xuyên defeated him together with Nguyễn Hữu Cảnh, Chey Chettha had to surrender, and abdicated the throne to Thommo Reachea III (Nặc Ông Thâm).

A civil war broke out in Cambodia in 1714. King Thommo Reachea III attacked the vice-king Ang Em (Nặc Ông Yêm), and captured Longvek with the support of Siam. Ang Em had to seek refuge for Nguyễn lord. Xuyên and Nguyễn Cửu Phú were sent to help him. They besieged Longvek. Thommo Reachea III and Chey Chettha IV were forced to desert the city and fled to Siam. Ang Em was installed as the king by Vietnamese.

== See also ==
- Hoa people
- Minh Hương
- Dương Ngạn Địch
- Mạc Cửu
