= Choeung Sopheap =

Cambodian businesswoman

Oknha Choeung Sopheap
- ឈឿង សុភាព
- Born: Cambodia
- Citizenship: Cambodia; Cyprus
- Occupation: Businesswoman
- Organization: Pheapimex
- Spouse: Lau Meng Khin
- Children: Choeung Sokuntheavy; Choeung Thean Seng

Oknha Choeung Sopheap (Khmer: ឈឿង សុភាព), also known as Yeay Phu (យាយភូ; Chinese: 楊丹葡; pinyin: Yáng Dānpú; Pe̍h-ōe-jī: Chhiûⁿ Tan-phû), is a Cambodian businesswoman of Chinese descent. She owns Pheapimex, a major conglomerate, with her husband Lau Meng Khin. She was awarded the title of Oknha in 2006. Her businesses have been linked to industrial-scale illegal logging and eviction.

== Personal life ==
Sopheap is Cambodian of Chinese descent. She is married to Lau Meng Khin. They both hold Cypriot citizenship. Her children include Choeung Thean Seng and Cheong Sukuntheavy; Sukuntheavy is married to Sopheap's stepson, Lau Vann.

Sopheap's family has attracted scrutiny over its wealth, including property holdings in Australia. The family also has business and marriage ties to the children of Hun Sen.
