= Lau Meng Khin =

Cambodian senator and businessman

Oknha Lau Meng Khin
- ឡៅ ម៉េងឃីន

Senator of Cambodia
- Incumbent
- Assumed office 2006
- Monarch: Norodom Sihamoni
- Prime Minister: Hun Sen

Personal details
- Born: 1 January 1944 (age 82) Cambodia
- Citizenship: Cambodia; Cyprus
- Party: Cambodian People's Party
- Spouse: Choeung Sopheap
- Children: Lau Vann; Lau Sok Huy; Lau Yao Zhong
- Occupation: Politician; businessman

Oknha Lau Ming Kan (born 1 January 1944, Khmer: ឡៅ ម៉េងឃីន; Chinese: 劉明勤; pinyin: Liú Míngqín; Pe̍h-ōe-jī: Lâu Bêng-khîn; also spelt Lau Meng Khin or Lao Meng Khin) is a Cambodian senator and businessman. He owns Pheapimex, a major conglomerate with his wife Choeung Sopheap. The majority of his fortune comes from logging and other sectors, including lucrative joint ventures with Chinese investors.

== Business interests ==
Meng Khin's businesses have been linked to controversies. He owns Shukaku, which was responsible for forcible land evictions at Boeung Kak lake. In February 2007, the Phnom Penh municipality awarded Shukaku with a 99-year lease to fill in and develop the lake, which impacted 4,250 families. His firm Pheapimex owns Cambodia's largest land concession. He was awarded the title of Oknha in 2006.

== Personal life ==
Meng Khin is a Chinese Cambodian of Teochew descent. He is married to Choeung Sopheap. They both hold Cypriot citizenship. He has several children, including Lau Vann, "Michelle" Lau Sok Huy, and "Alex" Lau Zhong Yao. Meng Khin's biological son Lau Vann is married to his stepdaughter, Choeung Sokuntheavy.

Meng Khin's family has courted significant scrutiny for their significant wealth, including properties in Australia. The family also has significant business and marriage ties to the children of Hun Sen.
