= Dương Ngạn Địch =

17th-century Chinese adventurer

Dương Ngạn Địch (chữ Hán: 楊彥迪, pinyin: Yáng Yàndí, Khmer: ឌួង ង៉ានឌីច, ?–1688) was a Chinese exile and seafarer who migrated to Đại Việt in the late 17th century.

Dương Ngạn Địch was a general of Ming China, native to Guangdong, and swore allegiance to Koxinga. His position was Chief Commander of Longmen (龍門總兵, a place in modern Qinzhou, Guangxi). In 1679, after the Revolt of the Three Feudatories was put down by the Kangxi Emperor of the Qing dynasty, he led 3,000 soldiers and 50 ships that came to Đà Nẵng together with Hoàng Tiến (黃進), Trần Thượng Xuyên and Trần An Bình (陳安平), and "surrendered" to Nguyễn Phúc Tần (although there is scholarly consensus that Phúc Tần had little choice in the matter).

Dương Ngạn Địch and Hoàng Tiến were sponsored to Mỹ Tho by Phúc Tần, where Địch served as chief of a small Chinese community. Địch was murdered by his assistant Hoàng Tiến in 1688. Tiến then revolted against the new Nguyễn lord, Nguyễn Phúc Thái, but was eventually put down.

== See also ==
- Minh Hương
- Trần Thượng Xuyên
- Mạc Cửu
