= Shukaku Inc. =

Cambodian development company

Shukaku Inc
- Company type: Private
- Headquarters: Phnom Penh, Cambodia
- Area served: Cambodia
- Key people: Lau Meng Khin

Shukaku Inc. is a private development company based in Phnom Penh, Cambodia. It is headed by Senator Lau Meng Khin from the Cambodian People's Party and chairman of the Cambodian Chamber of Commerce who also directs the Pheapimex Group.

The company filled in the Boeung Kak lake in central Phnom Penh amid controversy and protests, and is now undertaking commercial development there.

== Boeung Kak lake development ==
Despite a land law in 2001 passed by the Royal Government of Cambodia recognising land titles if proof of residence for five continuous years can be shown, residents of Boeung Kak were denied land titles. Later in the same month of February 2007, the Phnom Penh Municipality and Shukaku Inc. signed a $79 million 99 year lease agreement for over 133 hectares of prime real estate including Boeung Kak and the surrounding land affecting around 4,225 families. David Pred, co-founder of Bridges Across Borders claims that "The lease is illegal because the lake is state public property and cannot be leased for more than 15 years or damaged or destroyed...by filling in the lake, it will be destroyed.”

On 26 October 2008, Shukaku Inc began filling the lake with sand causing flooding and the collapse of some houses. Water and electricity was cut.

In September 2010, over 1500 affected families were forced to accept compensation for their homes and land well below the market value. Yim Sokhom, an army commander claims that representatives of Shukaku Inc. offered a reimbursement of US$4000 for his property though similar properties around Phnom Penh would sell for over US$40,000

Many former residents of the lake villages now live in slums surrounding the lake. The overcrowded nature of these newly formed slums has led to serious health concerns.

The campaign to prevent the development was featured in the 2017 documentary A Cambodian Spring.

== See also ==
- List of Cambodians
