= Boeung Kak =

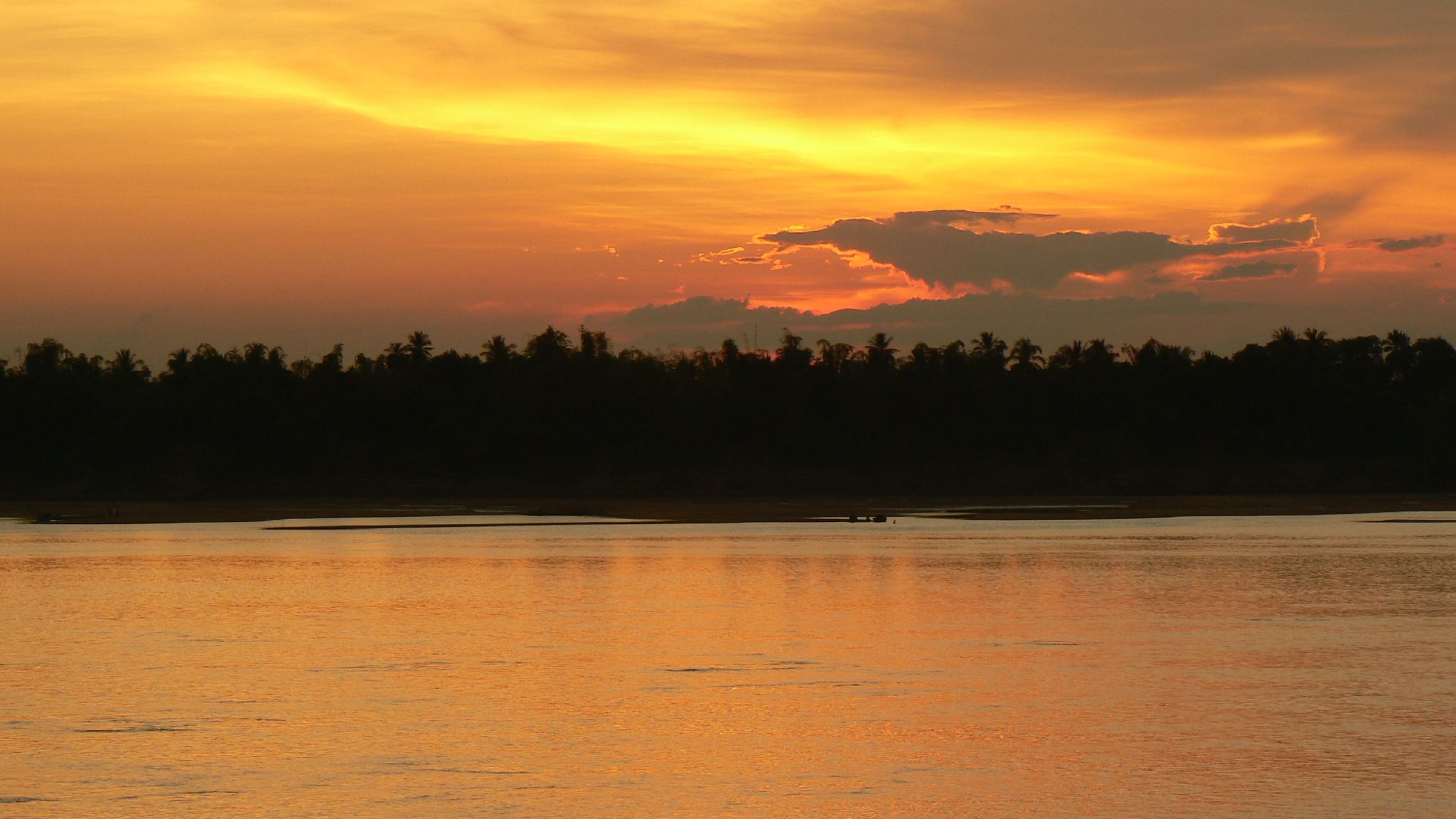
- Boeung Kak lake at the evening, below the map as it was before 2009.

- Location within Cambodia Location within Asia

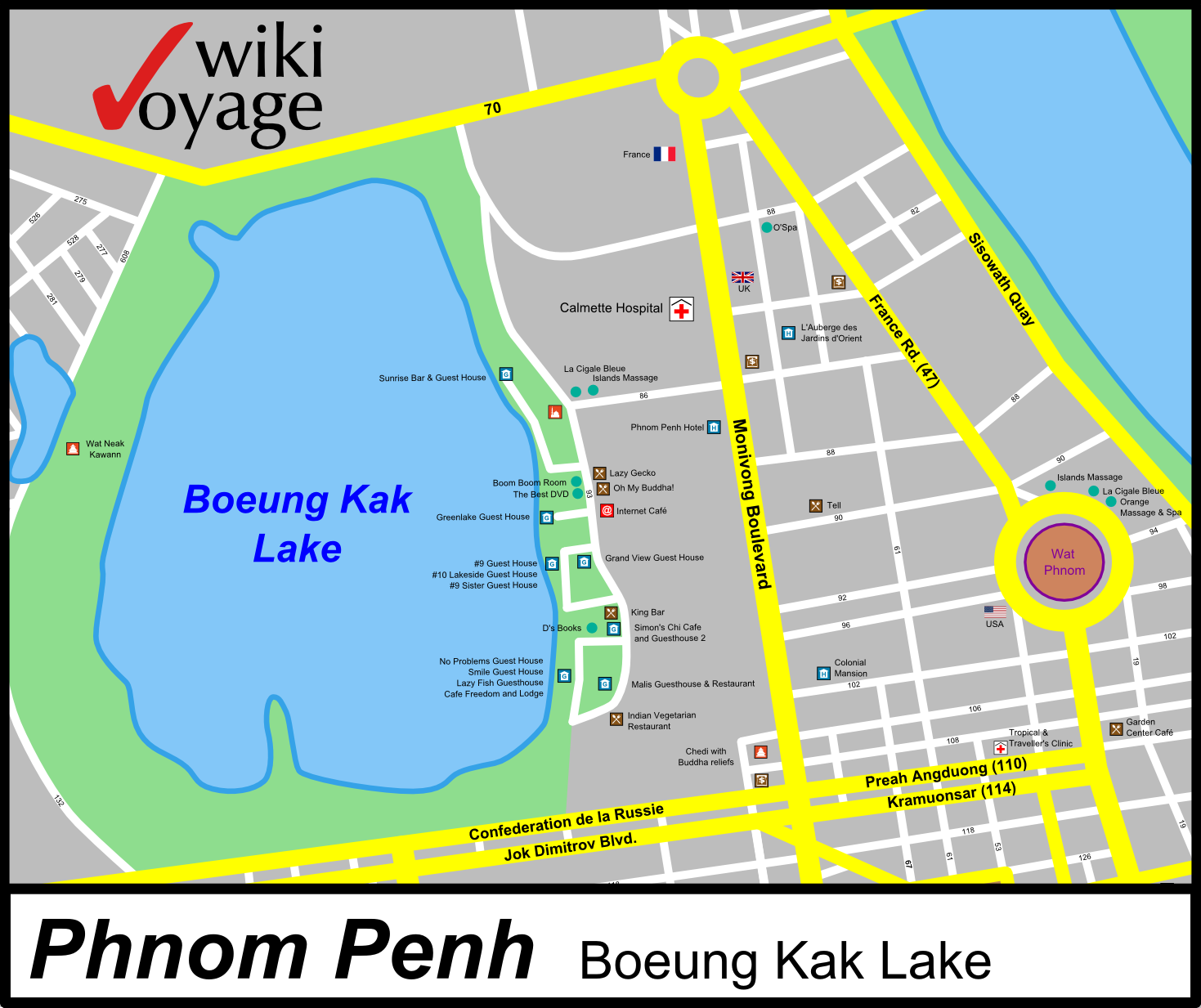
- Location: Phnom Penh
- Coordinates: 11°34′41″N 104°54′35″E
- Type: shrunken lake due to urban development
- Basin countries: Cambodia
- Settlements: Phnom Penh

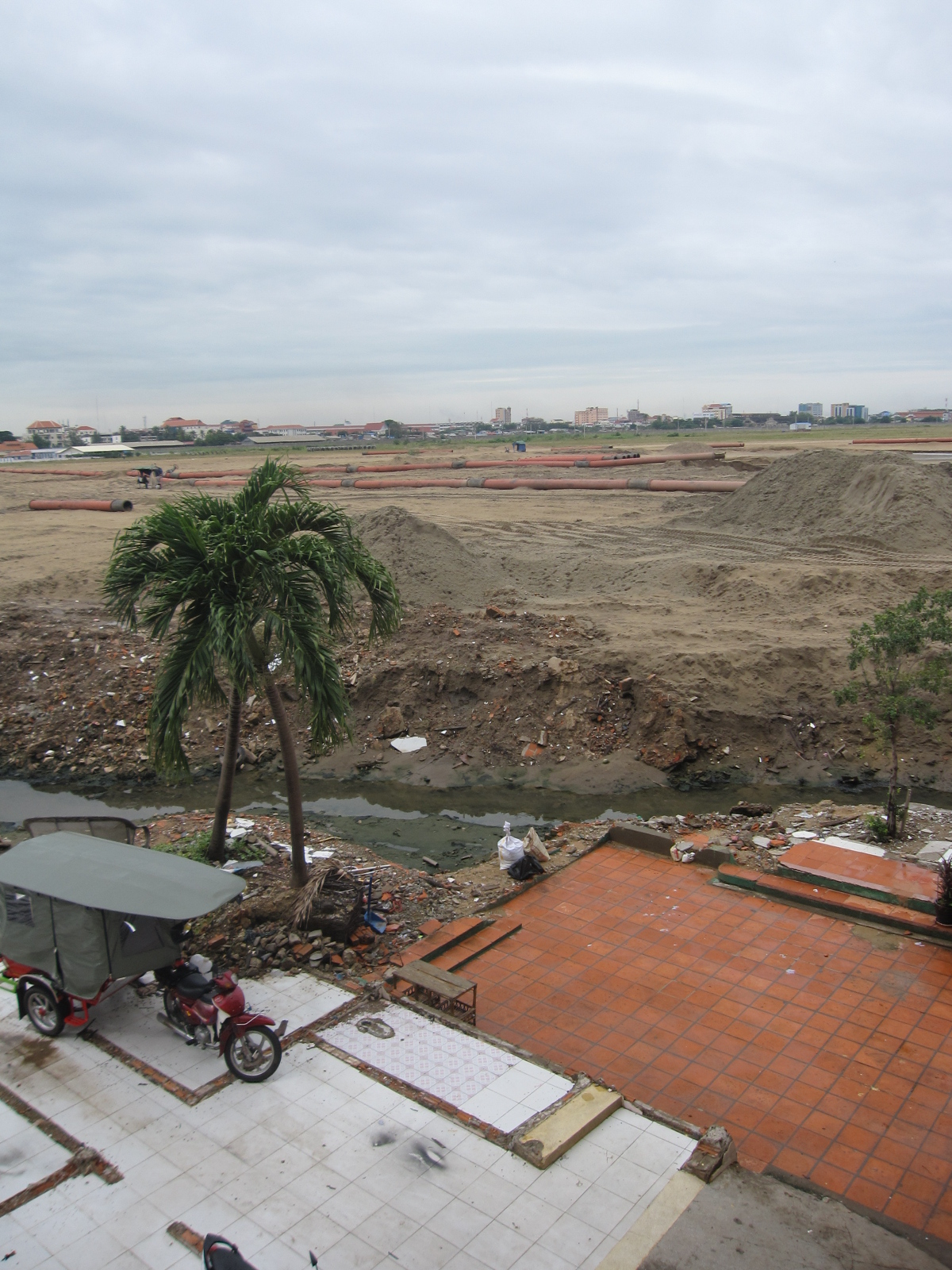
Filled in Boeung Kak Lake with demolished guest house

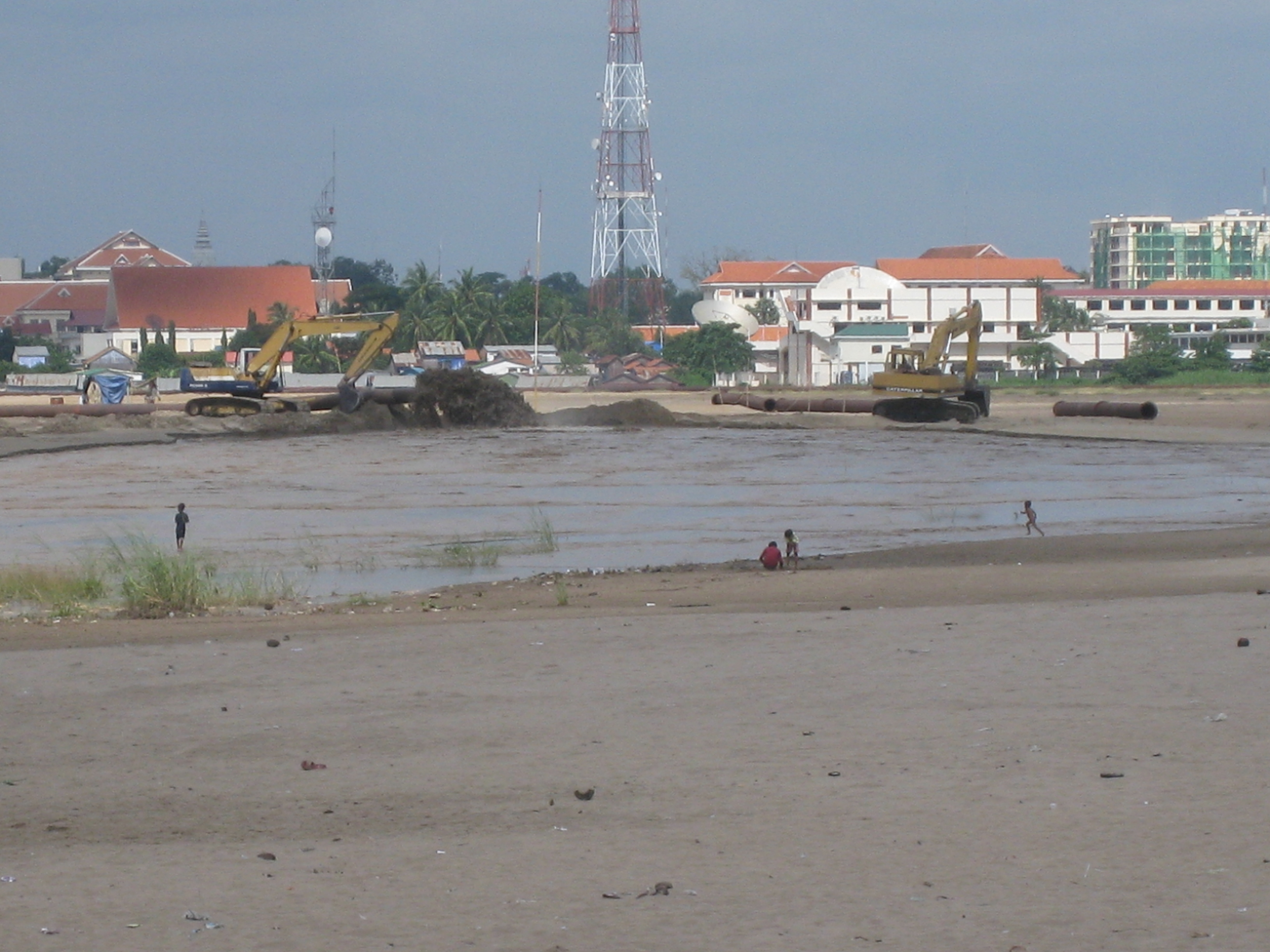
Image of the Boeung Kak Lake project

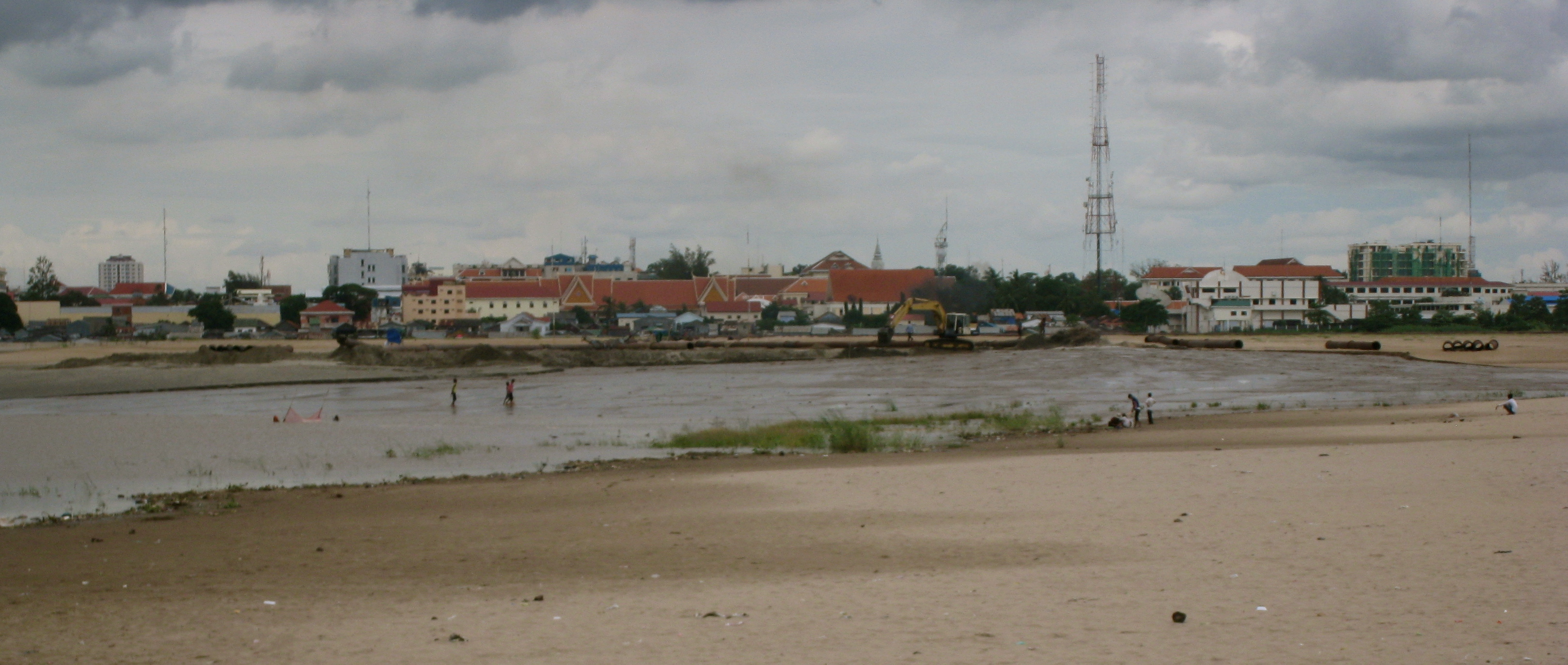
Boeung Kak Lake Project

Boeung Kak (Khmer: បឹងកក់) is an area in Khan Toul Kourk, centrally located in the capital city of Cambodia, Phnom Penh. Until around 2010, it was the largest urban lake in Phnom Penh. Residential areas, businesses, restaurants, hotels, embassies and other local businesses surrounded the area of the lake. Phnom Penh railway station formerly sat on its south coast. The lake itself was 90 hectares in area.

In 2007, the Cambodian government made an agreement to lease the land to Shukaku Inc. for 99 years. This agreement resulted in the filling of the lake with sand for the company to build condominiums and other complexes on the land. The change of the lake and the area surrounding the lake had a major social and environmental impact and was the site of a lengthy land title dispute with local residents, with thousands of people eventually being evicted from the area. Several local residents, non-governmental organizations and international actors protested the destruction of Boeung Kak Lake. In 2010, 90 percent of the lake had already been filled with sand. As of 2015, roads and drainage infrastructure have been installed and real estate development is taking place there.

== Boeung Kak area lease ==
The Municipality of Phnom Penh announced on 6 February 2007 that it had granted a 99-year lease for the amount of US$79,002,000 for 133 hectares of land surrounding and including Boeung Kak Lake. The lease was given to a small private development called Shukaku Inc., which is owned by the wife of Lao Meng Khin, a senator for the Cambodian People´s Party (CPP). In the lease the municipality predicted that 4,252 families in Sangkat Chak Khan Daun Penh and other areas around the lake would be affected. The development group Shukaku Inc. wanted to lease the land for the production of trade and service places for domestic and international tourists, as well as for building high-end condominiums. Shukaku Inc. later made a deal with a Chinese Investment Group called Erdos Hongjun Investment Corporation, which was also to help out with the building projects on the newly gained land.

Shukaku has termed the development of the lake "Phnom Penh City Center", and has built an office, roads, and drainage infrastructure on the site. Shukaku struck a joint venture with Chinese firm Erdos Hongjun Investment Corporation in 2010, but this collapsed in 2014. Beijing-based Graticity Real Estate Development bought 20 hectares from Shukaku and is now building the first major development at Boeung Kak, called "One Park".

== Background to land title concerns ==
The people living on the land around the lake are concerned about losing their land. Land title concerns related to the lease of Boeung Kak Lake are a result of a long history of land title issues in Cambodia. In 1930, during the long period of colonialism of Cambodia by the French most of the land had been registered as private property. However, the French system was upheld after Cambodia gained independence in 1953. In the years thereafter more land was distributed to the population and in 1962, 84 percent of agricultural households owned land. The trend shifted during the 1970s and the ownership of land moved from the whole population to mostly the privileged classes owning land.

During the Khmer Rouge Regime in Cambodia from 1975 to 1979 the regime abolished all ownership and land titles as well as all existing official land records in Cambodia. In doing so, the Khmer Rouge owned all the land in the country and excluded any private ownership of land. Ten years after the Khmer Rouge Regime the land was still owned by the state of Cambodia. A majority of the households surrounding Boeung Kak Lake bought the land from military and government officials during land transactions in 1989. Because of the abolishment of records during the Khmer Rouge period, it is difficult to prove ownership and titles of the homes for some of the people living around the lake.

In 2001 a new land law was drafted with the help of the Canadian and Finnish governments that recognized private ownership for residential and agricultural holdings of land. Furthermore, the land law states that the Cambodian government should be in charge of the distribution of land. Article 30 of the law stated that land continuously occupied without contestation for five years before 2001 could be claimed for documented private ownership. The land law included the area surrounding Boeung Kak Lake. According to Article 15 of the Cambodian land law, water bodies, lakes and rivers such as Boeung Kak are all considered state property. Articles 16 and 18 state that leasing public property must not exceed 15 years and must not damage the property or change its function in providing public services. The law has resulted in controversies in the case of Boeung Kak Lake, as the lake was leased for 99 years. In 2008, the Boeung Kak Lake was transformed from a public to a private property of the state, after a sub-decree was signed.

As a result of the 2001 land law, a Land Management and Administration Project began in 2002. The project has as a goal to over 15 years manage natural resources and promote equal land distribution to the people of Cambodia. Although 1.3 million titles have already been issued as a result of the 2001 land law, BABC (a non-governmental organization) still questions the success of the program.

== Environmental impact ==
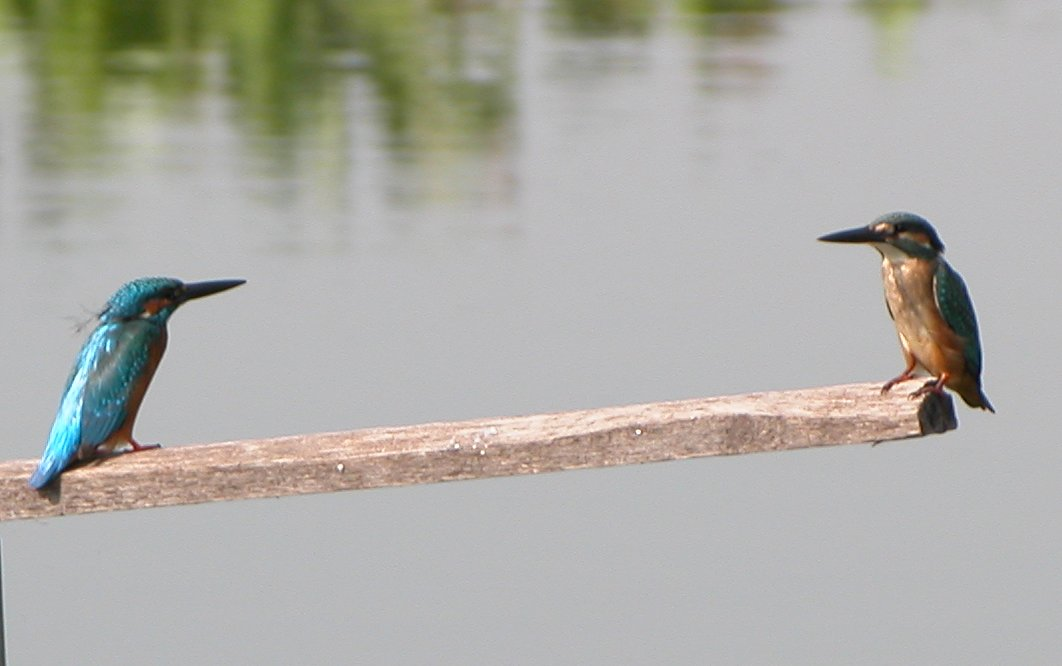
Kingfishers located at Boeung Kak (Lake)

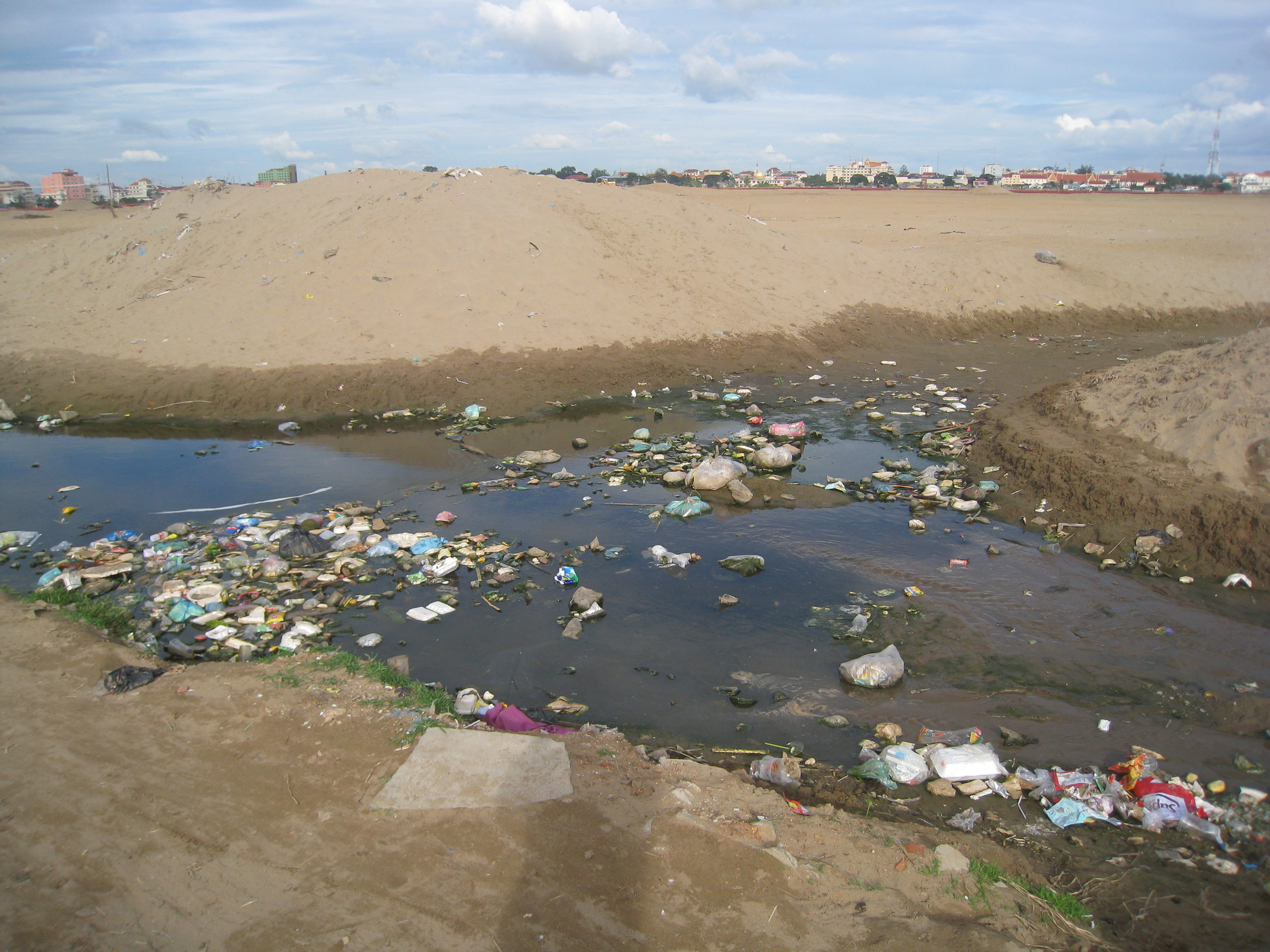
Boeung Kak Lake Environmental Impact

The lake has had a historical significance for the environment. In the post World War I era a canal was built linking the Boeung Kak Lake to the larger lake, Tonle Sap, which lies just above the Mekong. During the 1960s a water system was developed in Phnom Penh as a drainage system that would pump water into the rivers. The system was important to control flooding in the city.

Boeung Kak Lake, which most recently operated as a closed lake system with no water leaving the lake has been filled with sand. Equitable Cambodia (formerly known as Bridges Across Borders Cambodia), a non-governmental organization working in Cambodia has estimated that including the Boeung Kak lake case, over a quarter of rural land areas have been granted as economic land concessions to both Cambodian and international investors, which impacts the environment in the area. Boeung Kak Lake played an important role in reducing storm runoff for the areas surrounding the Lake. In Cambodia with a long rainy season lakes are very important. For the capital, Phnom Penh, lakes and rivers serve as important resources for wastewater and stormwater drainage. Additionally the open spaces that surrounded Boeung Kak Lake are important for a normally densely populated city, with an increased number of vehicles and pollution. During the monsoon season, the water level rises above the ground level of the city and a space is required to retain the water during that period. With Boeung Kak Lake being filled with sand, there are more chances of flooding. Flooding examples have already been seen in the cases of other lakes previously filled such as the example of Pong Peay.

The lake has also served as an important source of aquatic life especially in terms of vegetables and fish. With the Lake being 90% filled, the aquatic life has been eliminated from the area.

Shukaku Inc. released an environmental and social impact assessment in August 2008 including plans to address the environmental impacts happening in the area. One of the suggestions was to dig a canal in the area. As of 1 May 2013 no work has been done to assess the economic impacts of the project.

As of 27 February 2012 Boeung Kak Lake can no longer be seen on a Google map of the area, as a result of the lake being filled with sand. New roads and buildings are clearly visible on updated satellite views of Google Maps (in place of Boeung Kak Lake).

== Social impact ==
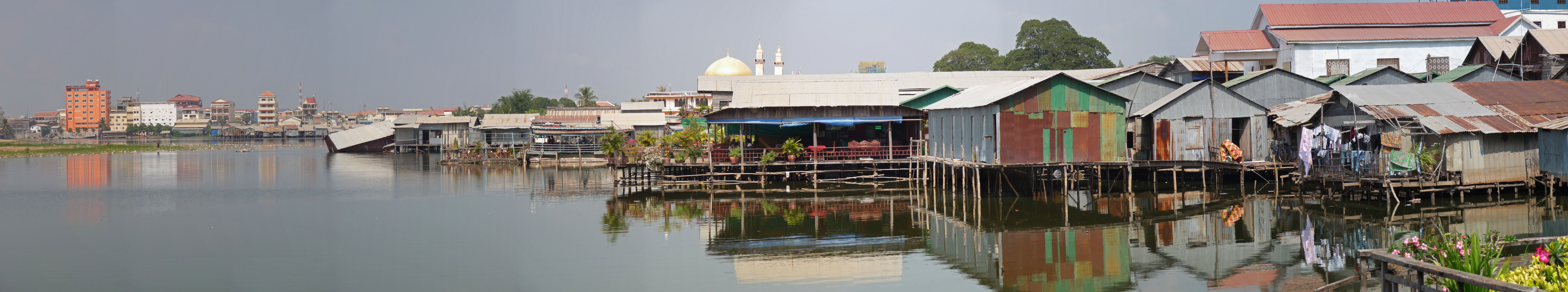
Housing at lake Boeung Kak (2010)

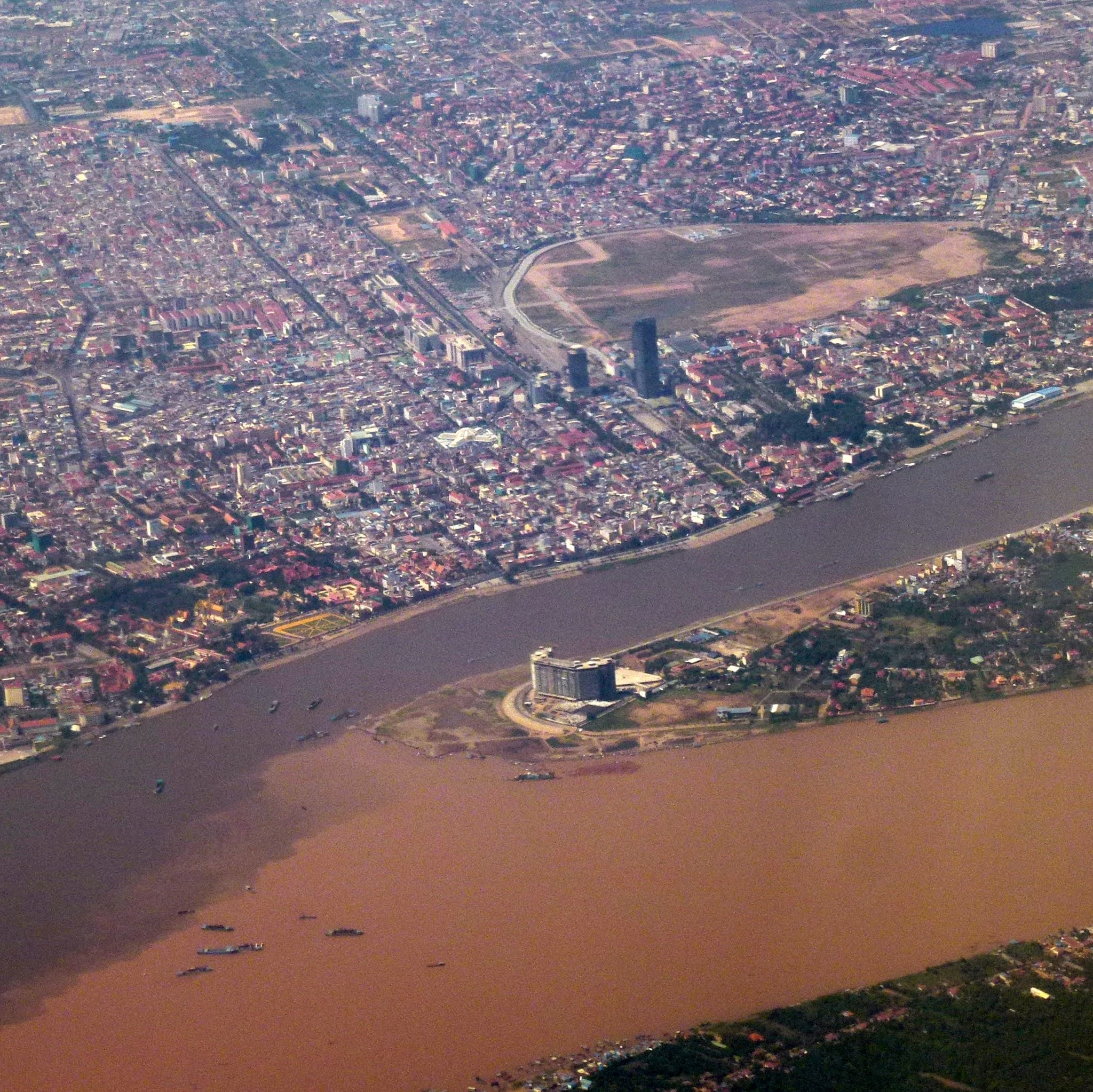
View of filled in lake alongside Phnom Penh, Tonlé Sap River and Mekong in 2014.

Boeung Kak Lake is in the middle of a residential area. After the Khmer Rouge families resettled by the lake and used the lake as an important resource for fishing, and harvesting plant life. With the tourism industry developing a proportion of the population started cafés and restaurants. The BBC reported that the lakeside had been a popular spot for backpackers. Before the agreement between Shukaku Inc. and the government the lake was also a valuable water resource for everyday needs.

Although the numbers vary, around 3,500 families, which is the equivalent of 17,500 people, have been forcibly evicted from their homes surrounding Boeung Kak Lake since August 2008 for the building project of Shukaku Inc. to take place. After pressure from numerous non-governmental organizations and international actors, around 600 of the remaining families have been given land titles under a concession by the prime minister himself, made in 2011. Ninety families were excluded from the concession. For the residents who have stayed in the area floods have been very common. In July 2010 residents reported floodwater mixed with wastewater from toilets that reached all the way to their hips. Reported problems have also been made with the sand pumping directly into resident houses, forcing the residences to leave. Furthermore, as a result of the powerful pumping of sand, many residential houses are now buried in sand.

On 10 August 2009 more than 150 residencies in the Boeung Kak area were issued the first form of eviction notice. The residencies were given a week to choose and accept compensation from the government, so the process of moving occurred very quickly.

The residents were offered three choices from the government as compensation for losing their land. They were offered either US$8,500, a flat on the onsite development in addition to US$500 or resettlement 20 kilometers outside of Phnom Penh. Heng Mom, one of the residents of Boeung Kak Lake has stated to the BBC indicating that the compensation is not nearly enough to get land around Phnom Penh. By 2011, tourists had ceased visiting the area, depriving local business owners of income.

The people surrounding Boeung Kak Lake are fighting a cause that has already occurred for a while in Cambodia. Since 1990 approximately 11 percent of the population of Phnom Penh have been evicted from their homes or relocated to places that lack infrastructure and access to public goods.

In February 2013 Shukaku Inc. was praised for "reducing poverty" in a letter from the Minister of Economy and Finance, Keat Chhon to the development company.

== Cambodian and international involvement ==
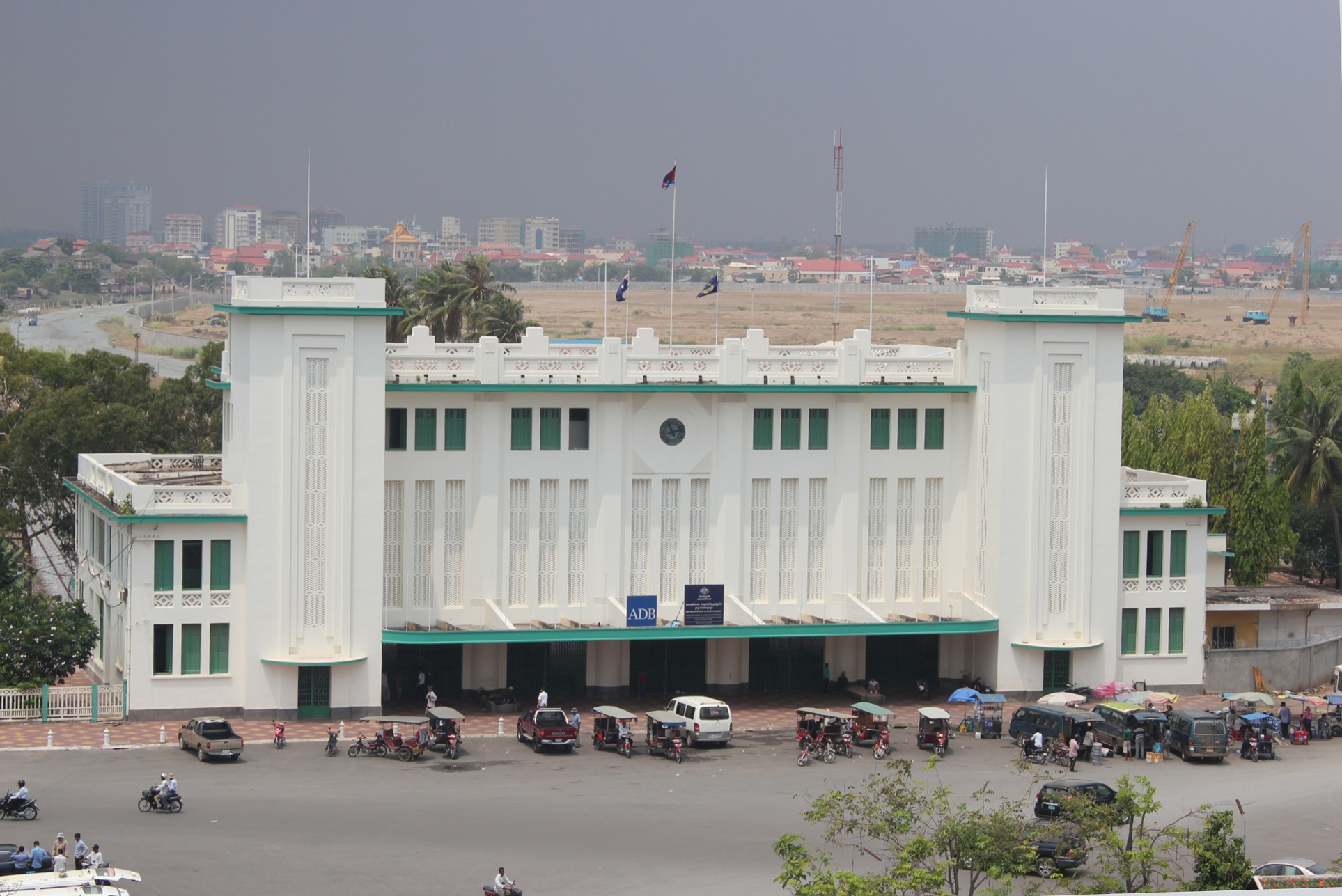
Phnom Penh railway station in 2012, showing the former lake site and construction in the background.

There are several international responses to the case of Boeung Kak Lake. The World Bank, one of the leading non-state actors for development, has taken a standpoint in the case. The bank normally provided Cambodia with US$70 million in loan every year. After pressure from the Boeung Kak community the World Bank stated in 2010 that it would not resume the loans to Cambodia until the conflict over the land and the eviction of people had been resolved.

The Boeung Kak 13 is a group of women who are working as an opposition to the lease of Boeung Kak Lake and the evictions of the people living in the area of the lake. The group is led by the female activist Tep Vanny. They personally were displaced after their land was a part of the lease made between the Cambodian government and Shukaku Inc. The youngest of the thirteen women is 25 years old and the oldest woman is 72. On 24 May 2012 the women were arrested and convicted of occupying the land illegally. All 13 women were sentenced to two and a half years in prison. The arrest of the Boeung Kak 13 was brought to the attention of the non-state actors Amnesty International and Human Rights Watch. The women managed to win the sympathy of Hillary Clinton, America’s secretary of state. The women were released and Tep Vanny will receive the Global Leadership Award in Washington in 2013 from Hillary Clinton herself. The women have continued their activist work and Tep Vanny has received international recognition for the documentary "Even a bird needs a nest".

On 10 December 2011 a special rapporteur from the UN visited the Boeung Kak community and wrote in a report that he walked away "encouraged by the determination shown by the women residents of the area to defend their rights peacefully". In addition to this meeting, during the arrest of the Boeung Kak 13 an action letter was sent by the UN to the Cambodian government on 4 June 2012 illustrating concern.

Several other protests have occurred over the issue of Boeung Kak Lake. On 22 April 2013, 80 former lake residents held a protest outside the Cambodian People’s Party headquarters. They were requesting that H.E. Chea Sim, the party president, solve the conflict surrounding Boeung Kak Lake. The protesters were also asking for the release of Yorm Bopha, a former activist fighting for the same causes.

The Cambodian Housing Rights Task Force (HRTF) is a coalition of 12 non-governmental organizations within Cambodia that have also taken a stand on the case of Boeung Kak Lake, and promote the right to adequate housing.

== Notable residents ==
- Yorm Bopha - land rights activist imprisoned by the Cambodian government in 2012, and again in 2016
