= Montigny Mission =

French diplomatic mission to Cambodia, Siam and Vietnam in 1856

Montigny Mission was a diplomatic mission of Charles de Montigny, a French diplomat who was then the French Consul in Shanghai, to the Southeast Asian polities of Siam, Cambodia and Vietnam, from July 1856 to February 1857. The mission was a part of a French effort to catch up with the British Empire to establish influences in the Far East.

The preceding events to the mission began in 1853, when King Ang Duong of Cambodia, his kingdom paying tributes to both Siam and Vietnam, through Bishop Jean-Claude Miche the Apostolic Vicar of Cambodia, sent a letter and gifts to Gauthier the French Consul in Singapore, hoping to procure relations with France. Gauthier forwarded these gifts to Toulon in Southern France but the French government considered them lost.

In response to the conclusion of the Anglo–Siamese Bowring Treaty in April 1855, in October 1855, Emperor Napoleon III of the Second French Empire appointed Charles de Montigny as the French imperial plenipotentiary to negotiate a new commercial treaty with the Western-friendly Kingdom of Siam and the anti-Western Nguyen-dynasty Vietnam. He was also instructed to protest the ongoing Vietnamese persecution of Catholics. For Cambodia, Montigny also received unofficial instruction to tell King Ang Duong that his earlier gifts to France were lost. Montigny, his family and his colleagues left Paris in December 1855. As France had been promoting itself as the global protector of the Roman Catholic Church and its missionaries, Montigny's mission concerned freedom of Christian proselytization and the protection of missionaries from persecutions. Montigny had to spend time in Rome in January 1856 to have an audience with Pope Pius IX, which delayed his journey to Southeast Asia.

Montigny's mission was a comedy of errors, hampered by frequent delays and obstructing monsoon winds. Montigny and his retinue were stranded in Egypt for three months due to his inability to procure a British mail ship to Singapore. His schedule was to arrive in Siam in March 1856. Montigny only managed to depart from Suez in April 1856, reaching Singapore in May. At Singapore, Montigny was further delayed as he had to wait for the arrival of the large French corvette Capricieuse for his mission. Everything was assembled at the end of June and Montigny left Singapore for Siam on the French steam-enhanced brig Marceau, along with French steam corvette Catinat under Captain Le Lieur and French sailing corvette Capricieuse under Commodore Jules Collier.

Montigny and his retinue arrived in Siam, in Bangkok, in early July 1856 during the reign of King Mongkut of Siam, who had been open for Western nations to conclude treaties with Siam. After some initial problems, Montigny was received in Bangkok with pomp ceremonies and grandeur on par with Chevalier de Chaumont of the seventeenth century. Montigny was admitted to a grand audience with the Siamese king Mongkut in the Siamese royal palace. In an audience, Montigny asked Mongkut about Cambodia. This move made the Siamese aware of Cambodian king Ang Duong's earlier secret endeavor with France in 1853 and the Siamese sought to monitor Montigny's interactions with Cambodia. Even though Montigny acknowledged Siam as the rightful suzerain over Cambodia, he somehow thought that Cambodia could independently pursue relations with France without Siam's approval.

Montigny successfully concluded the Franco–Siamese Treaty of August 1856, which allowed French consular and extraterritorial jurisdiction, freedom of Christians in Siam and the low three-percent import duty, in a similar manner to the preceding Bowring Treaty. Montigny also preliminarily sent a French missionary Charles Fontaine on the Catinat under Captain Le Lieur to deliver Montigny's letter to the Vietnamese imperial court at Huế. The Siamese kept Montigny delayed for another month until departure of Montigny and his retinue from Siam in September 1856. Siam sent some officials to spy on Montigny's mission in Cambodia among the Khmer men on board the Capricieuse to Cambodia.

Captain Le Lieur on the Catinat reached the Vietnamese gateway seaport of Danang or Tourane in September 1856. Fontaine attempted to deliver Montigny's letter to the Vietnamese both at Danang and at Thuận An but the Vietnamese officials refused to receive the letter. Fontaine left the letter on the beach and the letter was eventually returned to Le Lieur unopened. Le Lieur considered Vietnam's refusal to receive French diplomatic letter an affront to the prestige of the French nation. Le Lieur also noticed Vietnamese mobilization in Danang. These factors prompted Le Lieur to decide to bring the Catinat to attack Danang in September 1856, leading to the bombardment of Danang. Le Lieur sent French marines to conduct an amphibious assault on Danang. Vietnamese fortifications in Danang were crumbled and Vietnamese artillery were destroyed.

Montigny on the Marceau reached the Cambodian seaport of Kampot in October 1856, while Commodore Collier on the Capricieuse left to join Le Lieur in Vietnam. Siamese officials, who also disembarked at Kampot on the Capricieuse, allegedly threatened the Cambodians in Kampot not to cooperate with Montigny and went to deliver Mongkut's letter to the Cambodian king Ang Duong at the royal capital of Oudong. Bishop Jean-Claude Miche of Cambodia received Montigny in Kampot and told Montigny about the Siamese spy. Furious, Montigny expelled the Siamese official from Kampot and speculated that Siam had intended to spy on his activities in Cambodia.

Even though Montigny was initially assigned just to tell the Cambodian king about the lost gifts, at his own initiatives, Montigny sought to procure a treaty with Cambodia. King Ang Duong had planned to meet Montigny in Kampot but, after reading Mongkut's letter, changed his mind, telling Montigny to take a journey from Kampot to meet him in Oudong instead. Montigny was not keen on going to Oudong as he had been late on his schedule to go to Vietnam. Montigny and Bishop Miche drafted a treaty and assigned the inexperienced 26-year-old French priest Hestrest to bring the Franco–Cambodian Treaty draft for Ang Duong to sign at Oudong, expecting total compliance.

Montigny on the Marceau hurriedly left Kampot in late October 1856 but could not directly sail to Danang due to the opposing seasonal monsoon winds, having to take a circumventing route. Commodore Collier on the Capricieuse reached Danang in November 1856 to find the Vietnamese in a rather reconciliatory stance due to the shock of the earlier assault on Danang by Le Lieur. Delayed arrival of Montigny in Danang, however, spoiled the occasion as any negotiations could not be commenced until his arrival. Collier, Le Lieur and the Vietnamese all waited for Montigny in Danang. Le Lieur and the Catinat were recalled to the French naval base in Macau, leaving the mission and leaving Collier alone waiting for Montigny. Meanwhile, King Ang Duong of Cambodia rejected Montigny's proposed treaty draft presented by Hestrest in Oudong in November 1856 for Ang Duong's whole involvement in this French diplomatic mission served nothing but to expose his earlier secret endeavor with France to the Siamese.

Montigny on the Marceau went through Singapore, Borneo and Manila in order to circumvent the monsoon winds to eventually reach Danang in late January 1857 to find out that the Vietnamese had resumed hostile sentiments. The Vietnamese Emperor Tự Đức did not care about Montigny and ordered Đào Trí to deal with the French envoy with usual protocol. After the Vietnamese reception, Montigny the French plenipotentiary and Đào Trí the Vietnamese delegate negotiated for a Franco–Vietnamese Treaty. Montigny assumed coercive stance and came into conflict with Đào Trí over protocol and assertion of dominance. The negotiation broke down and failed because both parties proposed totally-opposing terms. Montigny attempted to force an unequal treaty, in the same manner that France had done with China and Siam, on the Vietnamese, who also put forward their own seclusive treaty terms. Montigny left Danang, along with Collier, empty-handed, without obtaining a Vietnamese Treaty, in early February 1857, thus ending his seven-month diplomatic mission to Siam, Cambodia and Vietnam.

== History of French relations with Siam and Vietnam ==
=== Foundation of Paris Foreign Missions Society ===
Originally, the Catholic mission in the Continental Southeast Asia had been under management of Portuguese Dominican and Franciscan priests. The Catholic Church had been relying on Spain and Portugal for evangelization of the faraway lands. The Portuguese were granted exclusive authority over missionary activities in Asia under the Padroado system. However, the Portuguese missionaries had been struggling, with little success in preaching the Gospel and ended up just mostly maintaining the church for the Portuguese and Luso-Asian Mestizos in Southeast Asia. By the seventeenth century, the popes began to see the Padroado system as ineffective and sought to bring missionary works in Asia back to papal power. Congregation for the Propagation of Faith or Propaganda Fide was established in 1622 under direct papal authority to oversee evangelization of peoples.

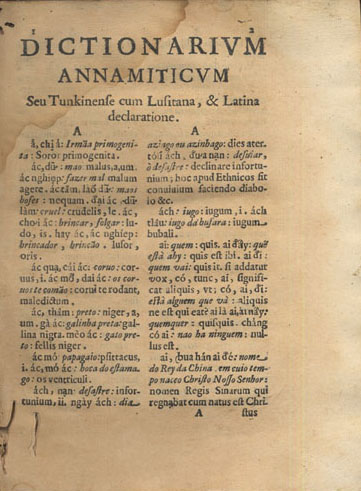
In 1651, Alexandre de Rhodes published Dictionarium Annamiticum Lusitanum et Latinum, which was a trilingual Vietnamese-Portuguese-Latin dictionary, through the Propaganda Fide. This was the first publication of chữ Quốc ngữ script.

Advent of fruitful proselytization in Continental Southeast Asia began in Vietnam. By the seventeenth century, the Le-dynasty emperors ruled at the imperial capital of Thăng Long (modern Hanoi) only as puppets of the Trinh Lords, who only had power over Northern Vietnam, whereas Central Vietnam (called Cochinchina at the time) had been under the independent Nguyen Lords (Southern Vietnam was still part of Cambodia). Portuguese Jesuit priests from Macau began effective evangelization in Vietnam, starting in Cochinchina in 1615. However, like in China, Christianity readily conflicted with Confucianism, which put high emphasis on the ancestor worship. The Vietnamese called Christianity Hoa Lang đạo (花郎道, "Holland Religion"). Catholic missionaries instructed Vietnamese converts to destroy their ancestral shrines and ancestral tablets. Rejecting or refraining from ancestor worship constituted a serious crime that could be punished with death penalty according to Vietnamese law.

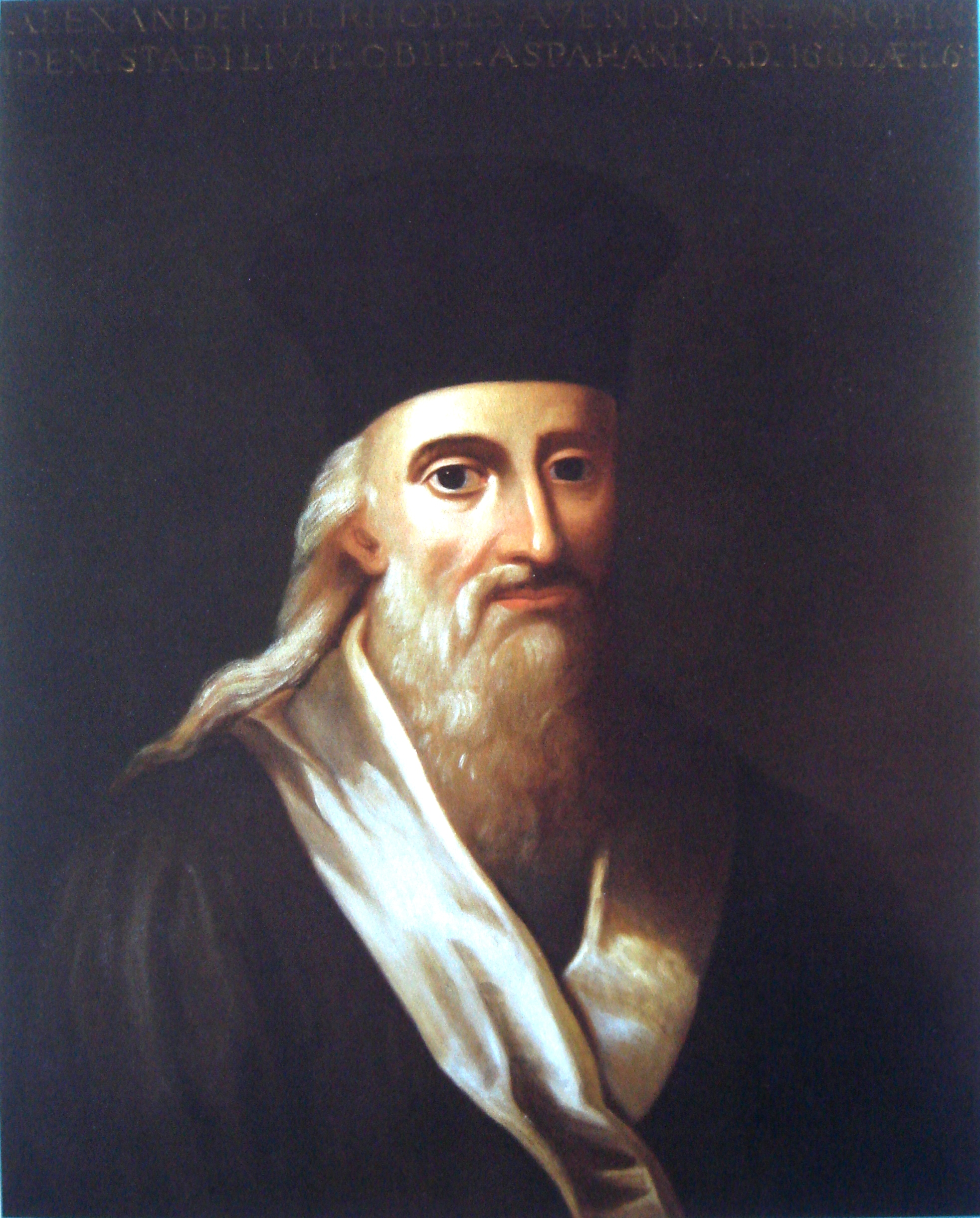
Alexandre de Rhodes the French Jesuit priest pioneered the establishment of French Paris Foreign Missions Society to send French missionaries to Asia and to train native priests.

French Jesuit priest Alexandre de Rhodes was expelled by both the Trinh Lord of Tonkin and the Nguyen Lord of Cochinchina in his attempt to spread Catholicism in Vietnam. In the span of five years, from 1640 to 1645, Alexandre de Rhodes was expelled by the Nguyen Lord four times, of which, at the last expulsion in 1645, De Rhodes was inflicted with death penalty but his sentence was commuted by the Nguyen Lord to exile. Meanwhile, in Northern Vietnam, the Trinh Lord issued bans on Christianity in 1649 and 1658. Vietnamese Catholics began to be persecuted and executed. However, in spite of the persecutions, the number of Vietnamese Catholics grew steadily to be at 80,000 in Tonkin and 20,000 in Cochinchina. Alexandre de Rhodes saw that if the Catholic Church were to establish a foothold in Asia, more missionaries were needed to be deployed and native priests should be trained. De Rhodes made his proposal to Pope Innocent X, who was pressured by Portugal, who claimed ancient rights accorded to them by the past popes, not to challenge Portuguese monopoly on missionary works in Asia.

Unsuccessful at his proposal to the pope, Alexandre de Rhodes turned to the French royal court of King Louis XIV. The French elites supported the idea of sending French priests to evangelize in Asia, leading to the establishment of Paris Foreign Missions Society (French: Société des Missions Etrangères de Paris, MEP) in 1658. De Rhodes recruited French secular priests François Pallu and Pierre Lambert de la Motte. In 1659, Pope Alexander VII consecreted François Pallu as the Apostolic Vicar of Tonkin and Lambert de la Motte as the Apostolic Vicar of Cochin. Bishop De la Motte left France in 1660, arriving in the Siamese royal capital of Ayutthaya in 1662 and preparing to go to Vietnam. However, the Portuguese Jesuits priests in Cochinchina warned De la Motte of imminent persecution by the Nguyen Lord so De la Motte decided to stay in Ayutthaya for a time being. Bishop Pallu, along with another French priest Louis Laneau, left France in 1662, arriving in Ayutthaya in 1664.

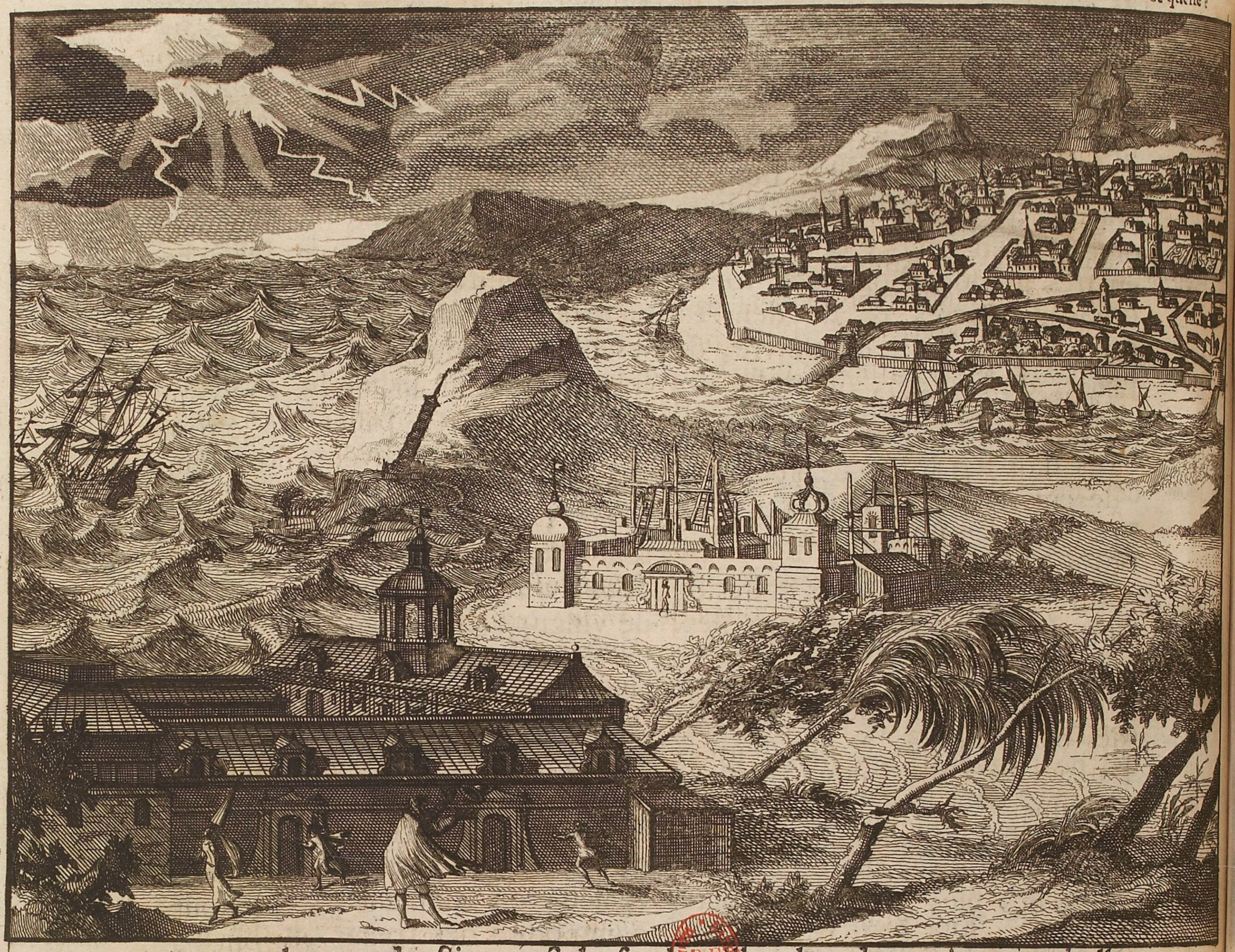
Seminary of Saint Joseph was built in 1665 on the land of Bangplahet in Ayutthaya granted by King Narai of Siam. The seminary later alternated between Bangplahet and Mahaphram.

Establishment of French Catholic mission in Continental Southeast Asia allowed France to pursue political and commercial interests in that region. French East India Company (French: Compagnie des Indes Orientales, CIO) was founded in 1664. At Ayutthaya, Bishop François Pallu the Apostolic Vicar of Tonkin and Bishop Lambert de la Motte the Apostolic Vicar of Cochinchina resided in Bangplahet, a Vietnamese community on the southeastern side of the city moat of Ayutthaya. Unable to go to Vietnam due to the ongoing persecutions, the two French bishops also faced resistance from the existing Portuguese clerics in the area, who refused to acknowledge authorities of the French bishops. In 1665, King Narai of Ayutthaya granted the land of Bangplahet for Pallu and De la Motte to build the Seminary of Saint Joseph as a school to train native priests. The Saint Joseph Seminary in Ayutthaya would serve as the base for French missionary activities in Vietnam.

Bishop De la Motte found that Siam was a tolerant kingdom, where Christians could practice religion and build churches without persecutions. The Siamese king Narai also found France to be a promising new incoming Western nation for Siam to counter the influences of the Dutch, who had been just imposed a naval blockade on Ayutthaya in 1663–1664, resulting in the humiliating Dutch–Siamese Treaty of 1664. De la Motte reported to the French court that King Narai was interested in Christianity and could be possibly converted. In 1665, Bishop Pallu returned to Rome from Siam to seek papal support against Portuguese resistance. Next year, in 1666, Bishop De la Motte at Ayutthaya sent out French MEP priests to evangelize;

- François Deydier and Jacques de Bourges went to preach in Tonkin or Northern Vietnam, settling in Phố Hiến in the Red River Delta.
- Guillaume Mahot went to proselytize at Hội An in Central Vietnam.
Founders of Paris Foreign Missions Society

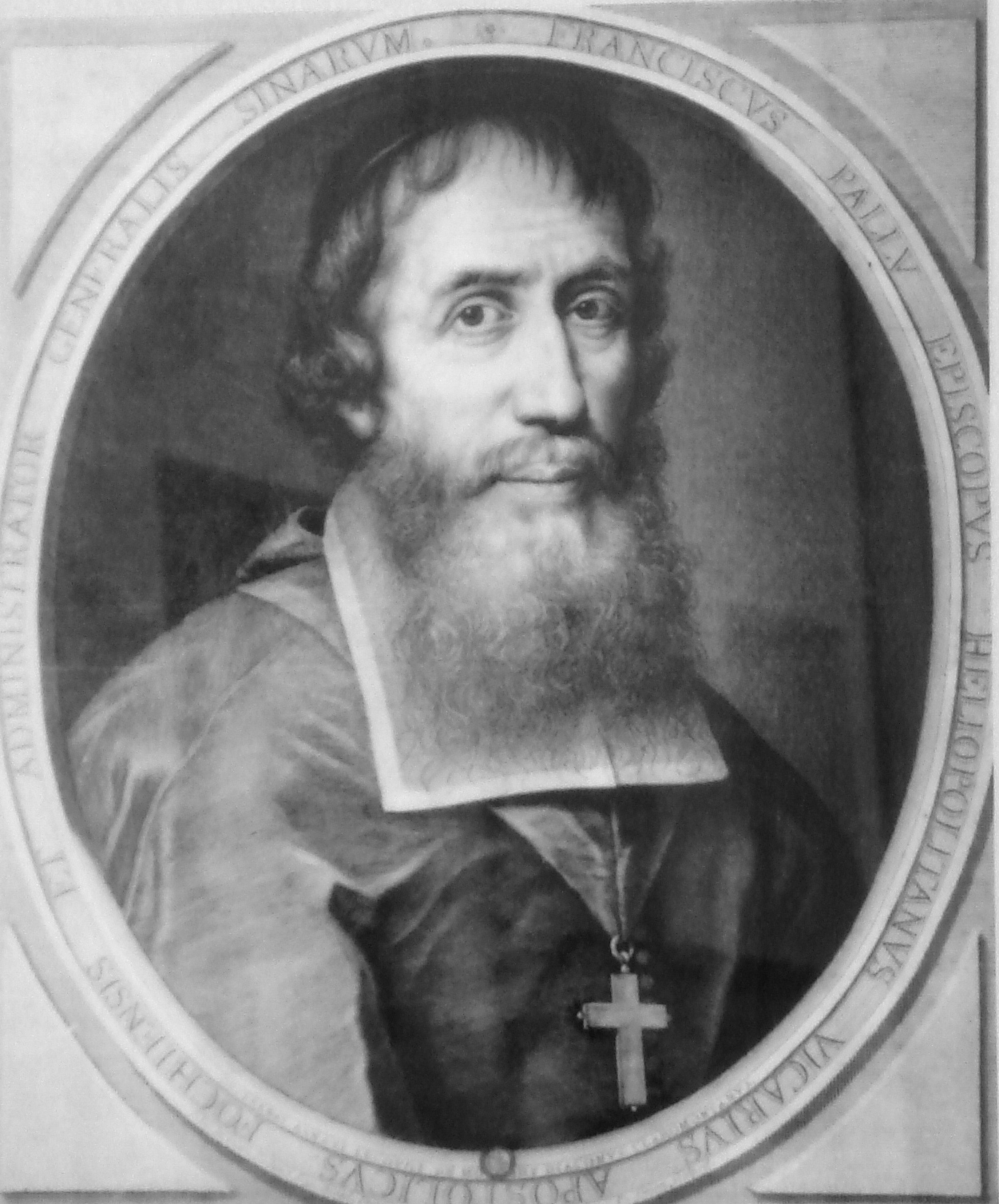
François Pallu, Bishop of Heliopolis, Apostolic Vicar of Tonkin

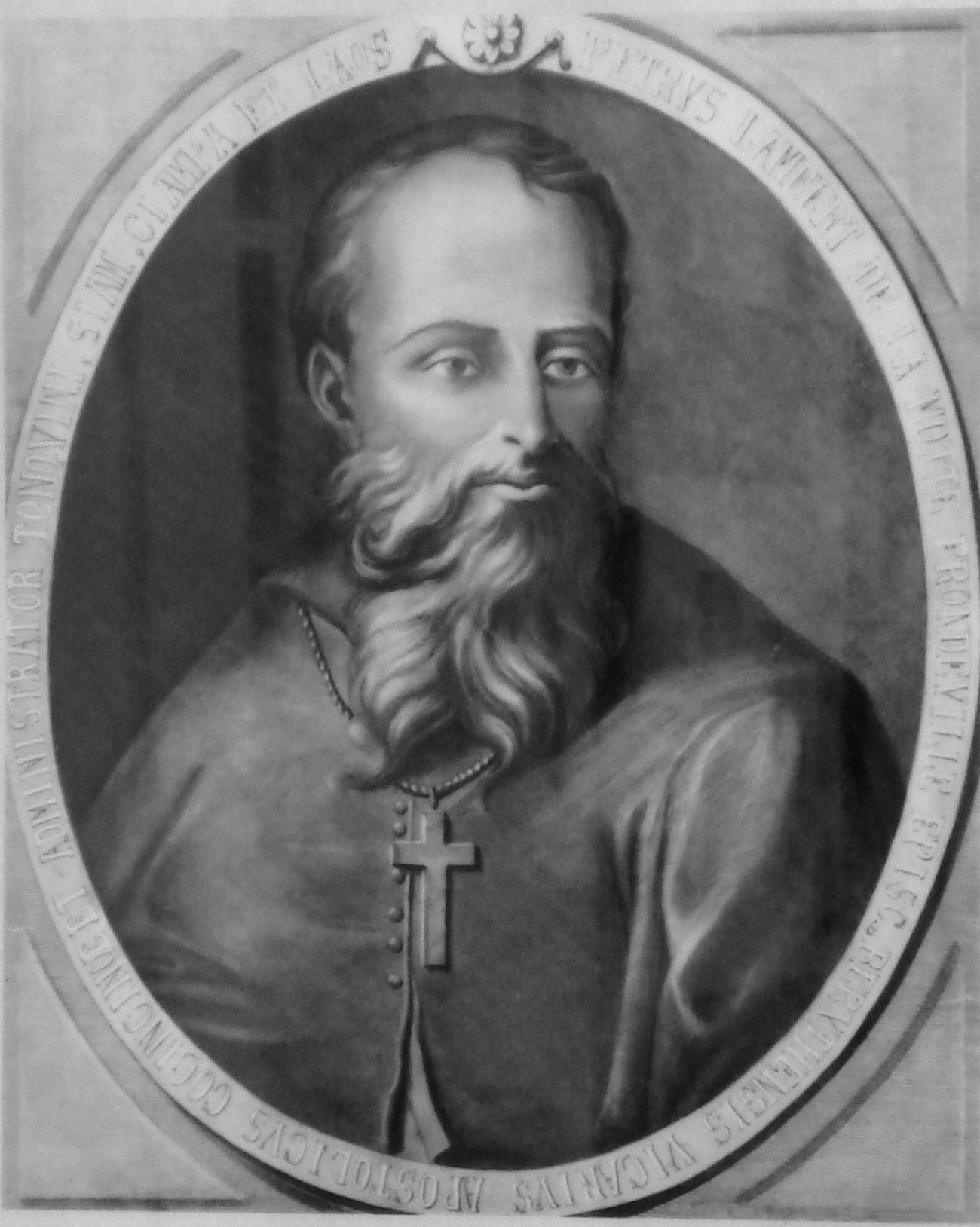
Pierre Lambert de la Motte, Bishop of Beirut, Apostolic Vicar of Cochin

In 1669, Pope Clement IX created the Apostolic vicariate of Siam to be under exclusive jurisdiction of the French MEP order and assigned Bishop François Pallu to bring papal letter to the Siamese king. In 1670, Bishop Pallu asked the French king Louis XIV to write letters to the Siamese king and to the Vietnamese Emperor. Bishop Pallu returned to Ayutthaya in 1673, where he presented the papal and French royal letters to the Siamese king Narai. Pope Clement also appointed Father Louis Laneau in Ayutthaya as the first Apostolic Vicar of Siam in 1674. In 1674, Bishop François Pallu, from Ayutthaya, boarded on a French CIO ship to deliver French gifts to the Vietnamese Emperor at Hanoi. However, the ship was attacked by the Dutch and ended up shipwrecked in Manila in the Philippines. Spanish authorities arrested Bishop Pallu, who was sent to Madrid for trial.

Even though the Nguyen Lord Nguyễn Phúc Tần had earlier persecuted Christians and had expelled the Jesuits, the Nguyen Lord saw the French newcomers as commercial opportunities. Nguyễn Phúc Tần welcomed Father Guillaume Mahot to reside in Cochinchina and wrote to the Siamese king Narai to allow Bishop De la Motte to move to Cochinchina. King Narai, however, refused to let go of De la Motte as he wanted to keep De la Motte as the intermediary in Franco–Siamese diplomatic ventures. Nevertheless, Father Mahot brought a ship from Cochinchina to bring Bishop De la Motte to Cochinchina. Bishop De la Motte reached Huế in 1676, where he was welcomed by the Nguyen Lord. However, De la Motte eventually decided to return to Ayutthaya.

Both Pope Innocent XI and King Louis XIV secured the release of Bishop François Pallu from Madrid in 1677. Bishop Lambert de la Motte died at Ayutthaya in 1679. Pope Innocent then reorganized the vicariate administration in Vietnam;

- Guillaume Mahot of MEP succeeded De la Motte as the new Apostolic Vicar of Cochinchina
- Apostolic vicariate of Tonkin or Northern Vietnam, which contained a large number of Vietnamese Catholics, was divided into two new vicariates;
  - Apostolic vicariate of Western Tonkin, with Jacques de Bourges of MEP as the first Apostolic Vicar of Western Tonkin, based at Phố Hiến
  - Apostolic vicariate of Eastern Tonkin, with François Deydier of MEP as the first Apostolic Vicar of Eastern Tonkin, based at Kẻ Sặt

=== Franco–Siamese diplomatic relations in the 1680s ===
In 1668, the French East India Company settled in Surat, which later became French India. In 1670, François Baron the French commissioner at Surat sent delegates of the French East India Company to establish commercial relations with Siam and Vietnam;

- André Boureau-Deslandes, with the ship Vautour, visited Ayutthaya to establish commercial relation with Siam. This was the first official diplomatic contact between France and Siam. King Narai allowed the French to establish a comptoir or trade factory in Ayutthaya.
- A French merchant named Chapelain, travelling with the ship Tonkin, went to Thăng Long (Hanoi) to establish commercial relation with Tonkin. Chapelain had an audience with the Vietnamese Emperor Lê Hy Tông. The Trinh Lord Trịnh Tạc allowed the French to establish a comptoir at Phố Hiến.

The French bought a large amount of merchandises from Tonkin, carrying on a French ship Soleil d'Orient from Tonkin to Ayutthaya. The Siamese king Narai, hoping to secure a relation with France, sent the Siamese Deputy Trade and Foreign Minister Okya Phiphatkosa to board on the Soleil d'Orient to France in a diplomatic mission. The Soleil d'Orient left Ayutthaya in 1681. However, the Soleil d'Orient shipwrecked off the coast of Madagascar with all the crews, including the Siamese envoy, presumed dead. The Tonkinese merchandises on the ship were also lost at sea. After his release from Madrid, Bishop François Pallu was appointed as the Apostolic Vicar of Fujian. Pallu left Ayutthaya in 1683, reaching Zhangzhou in 1684 but Bishop Pallu died in Fujian in the same year. Chapelain remained as the French representative in Phố Hiến until his death in 1686. Franco–Vietnamese relations in the seventeenth century would not be as prolific as the Siamese counterpart.

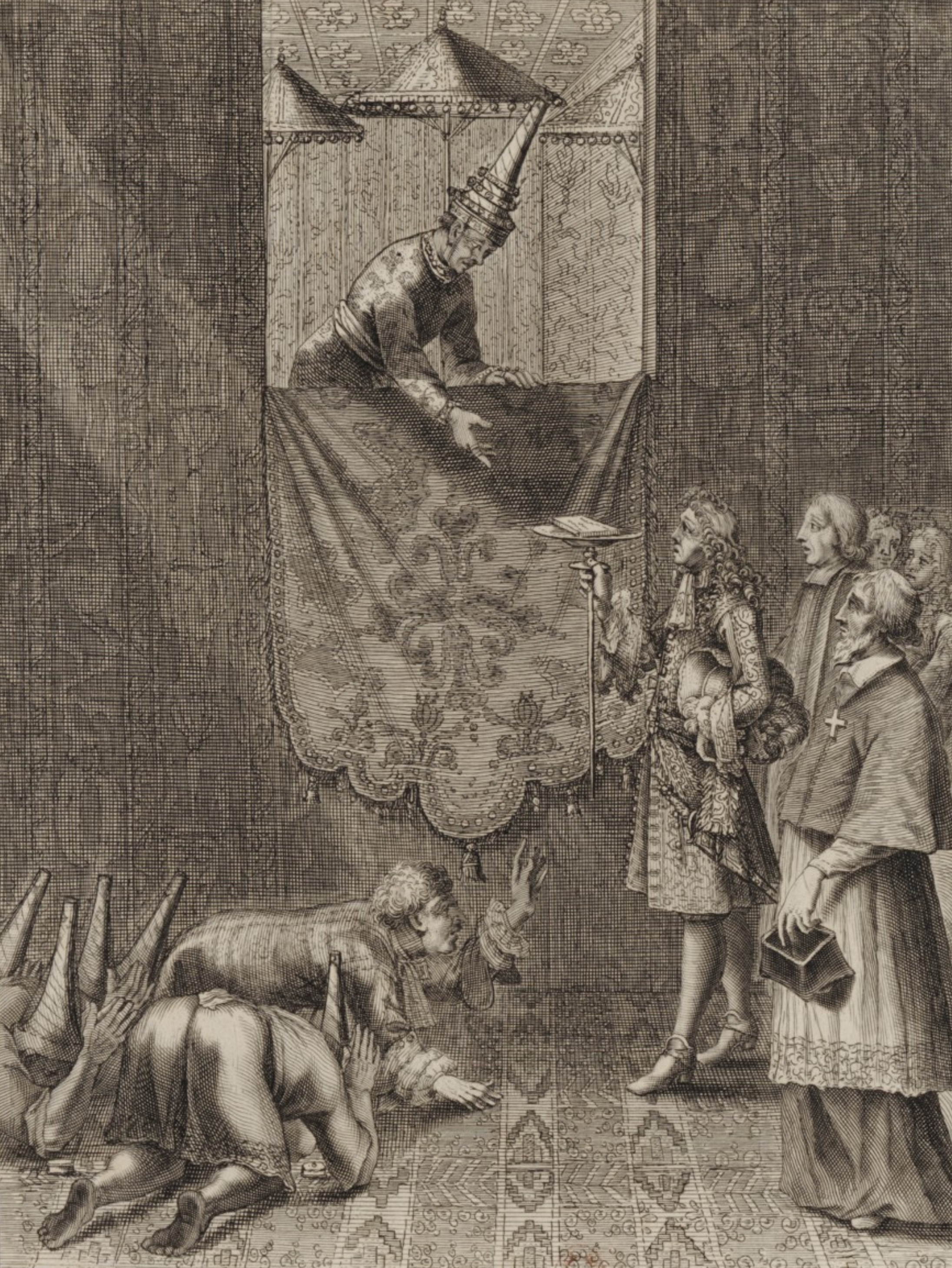
French envoy Chevalier de Chaumont, along with Bishop Louis Laneau, presented royal letter of Louis XIV to King Narai in October 1685 at Sanphet Prasat Throne Hall in Ayutthaya.

Constantine Phaulkon, a Greek adventurer and a former employee of English East India Company, arose to the position of Prime Minister of Siam at the death of Kosa Lek in 1683. In 1684, King Narai sent second Siamese diplomatic mission to France, led by two Siamese officials Okkhun Phichaiwanit and Okkhun Phichit Maitri, after the failure of the first mission, under guidance of a French MEP priest Bénigne Vachet, who led the Siamese envoys to Paris. The two Siamese envoys had an audience with the French King Louis XIV at the Palace of Versailles. Louis XIV reciprocated by sending Chevalier de Chaumont to lead a French diplomatic mission to Siam in 1685, leading to the conclusion of the Franco-Siamese Treaty of 1685, signed at King Narai's Palace at Lopburi, allowing the French missionaries to preach freely in Siam, granting exemption of duties and tin export monopoly from Phuket to the French East India Company, also allowing the French to settle in Songkhla in Southern Siam. Phaulkon then conspired with the French Jesuit priest Guy Tachard to bring the French to conquer Siam.

With papal support, the French MEP order practically supplanted the mostly-Portuguese Dominican, Franciscan and Jesuit priests, who refused to accept French priests as their overseers, as the main pioneer of evangelization in the region. As French–Portuguese rivalry over Catholic Church in Southeast Asia became more intense, Pope Innocent XI sought a compromise among the competing orders. Allowing the French MEP priests to monopolize missionary works in Asia would only result in schism so the Pope toned down dominance of the French. At the death of Bishop François Deydier of Eastern Tonkin in 1683, the Vicariate of Eastern Tonkin was given to Spanish Dominican Order. Also, with the death of Bishop Guillaume Mahot of Cochinchina in 1684, François Perez, a native priest with Filipino father and Siamese mother, who graduated from the Saint Joseph Seminary of Ayutthaya and did not belong to any orders, was made to succeed Mahot as the new Apostolic Vicar of Cochinchina in 1687.

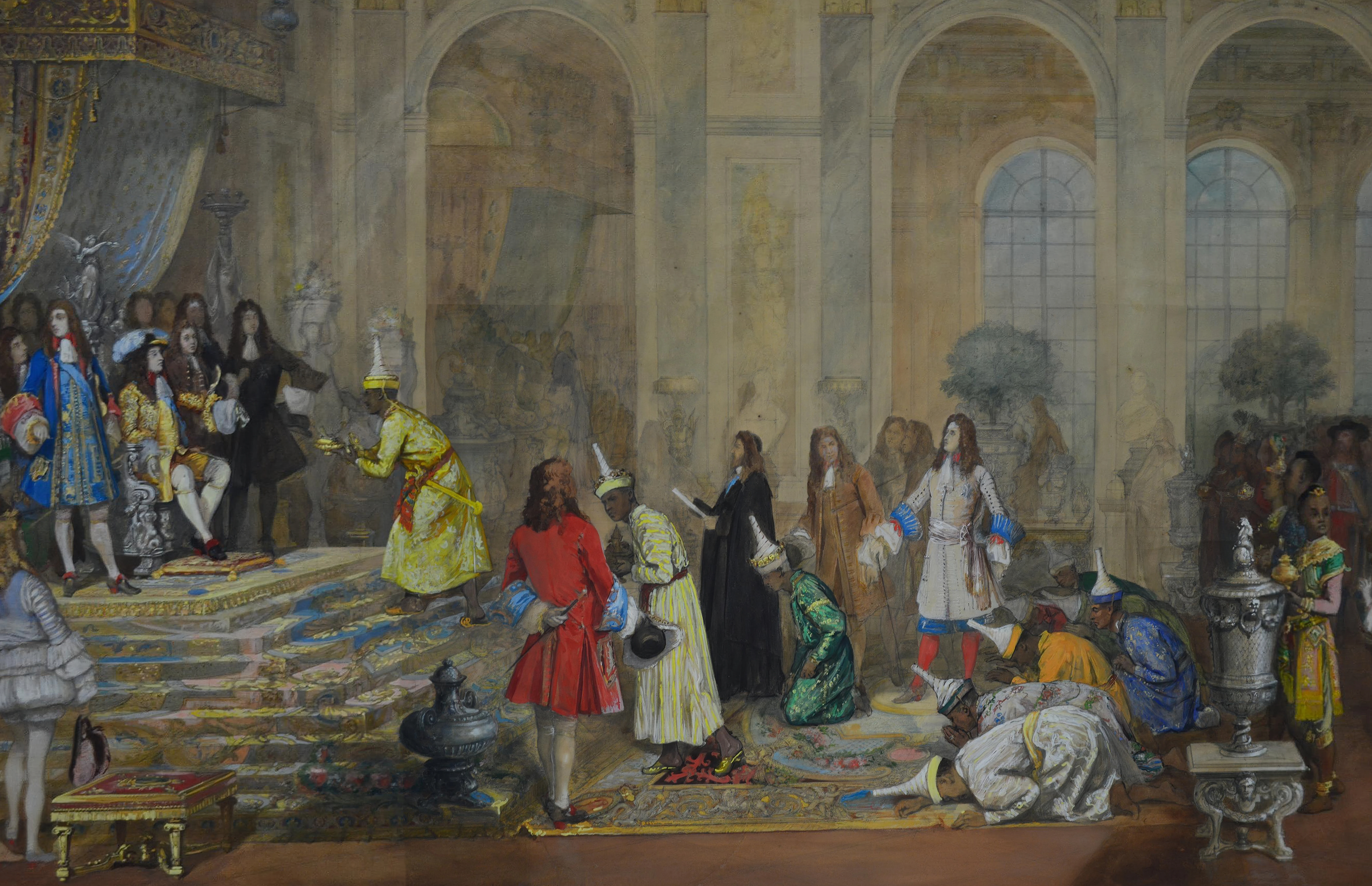
The Siamese envoy Kosa Pan presented the royal letter of King Narai to Louis XIV in the audience in the Hall of Mirrors at the Palace of Versailles in September 1686.

In 1686, King Narai sent the third and most well-known mission under Kosa Pan, along with Jesuit priest Tachard, accompanying De Chaumont back to France. Tachard presented Phaulkon's plan to the French royal court, who began their own plan to conquer Siam. King Louis XIV sent second embassy under Simon de la Loubère, along with General Desfarges to bring around 600 French men to Siam. King Narai allowed Desfarges to station French troops in Bangkok, downstream from Ayutthaya and at Mergui on the Tenasserim Coast. La Loubère concluded the Franco–Siamese Treaty of 1687 with the Siamese signatory Okya Phrasadet the Phrakhlang or Siamese Foreign Minister. Most of the clauses of this new Treaty of 1687 was similar to the previous Treaty of 1685, with additional clauses allowing the French to settle and establish posts anywhere in Siam and allowing France to impose extraterritoriality on Siam. Véret arrived as the director of the French comptoir, technically the French headman and representative of the company in Siam.

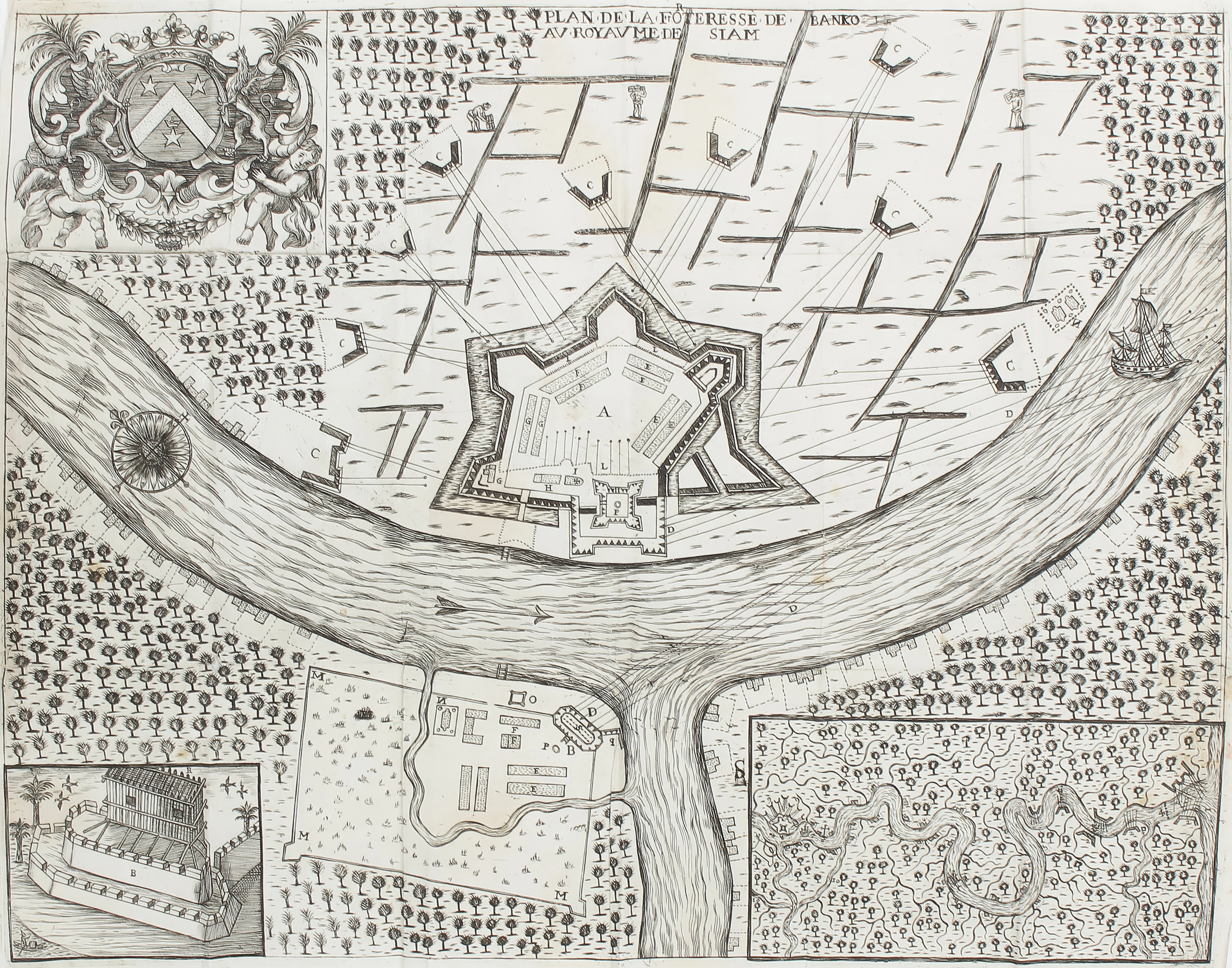
Siamese forces laid siege on the French-held Bangkok fort from June until a compromise was reached in November 1688, allowing French forces under Desfarges to leave peacefully.

King Narai allowing the French to exert influence over Siam upset native Siamese mandarins, who formed a nationalistic resistance movement under leadership of Okphra Phetracha. In January 1688, King Narai sent his fourth mission to Europe led by Father Guy Tachard to bring Narai's amicable letters to the French king and the Pope. However, King Narai fell ill two months later in March 1688. Phetracha seized King Narai's Palace in Lopburi and had Phaulkon executed in June. Phetracha sent Siamese forces to attack and lay siege on Desfarges at the Bangkok fort. King Narai died in July 1688. Phetracha proclaimed himself new King of Siam, founding the Ban Phlu Luang dynasty that would rule Siam until the Fall of Ayutthaya in 1767. Kosa Pan the Siamese envoy to France in 1686 was appointed as Phrakhlang Foreign Minister under Phetracha. After five months of siege, Kosa Pan agreed to let Desfarges bring the French forces to leave Siam peacefully, with hostages exchanged to guarantee the terms. Bishop Louis Laneau the Apostolic Vicar of Siam also served as the guarantor of the terms. However, Desfarges broke the terms by taking the Siamese hostages, along with Véret, with him to Pondicherry.

Kosa Pan the Siamese Foreign Minister punished Bishop Laneau and the French in Ayutthaya for Desfarges' breaking of the terms. Laneau, along with other French priests, merchants and Vietnamese seminarians, were all subjected to tortures and humiliations, some of them died in the process. Desfarges and Véret, seeking revenge on Siam, brought a French warship with 330 men to Junkceylon or Phuket in April 1689, calling for Kosa Pan to make a new treaty and to cede Phuket to France. The French in Phuket, however, did not manage to impose strong pressure on Siam. Desfarges eventually gave up and leave Phuket in November 1689, while also returning the Siamese hostages, ending the Franco–Siamese conflicts.

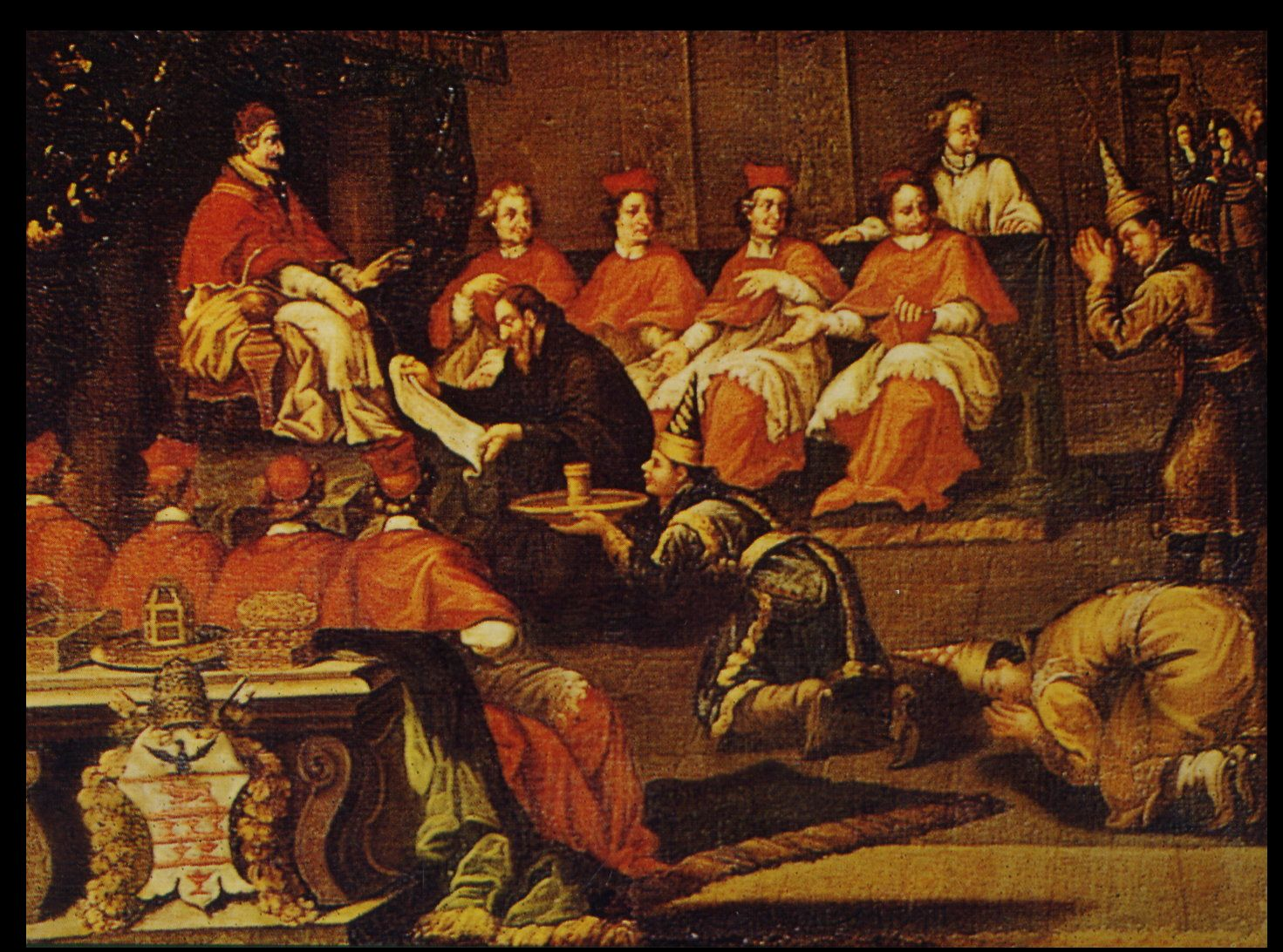
French Jesuit priest Guy Tachard, along with three Siamese mandarins Okmuen Phiphitracha, Okkhun Wiset Phuban and Okkhun Chamnan Chaichong, presented King Narai's letter to Pope Innocent XI at Rome in December 1688.

Guy Tachard, King Narai's envoy to Rome and Paris, was informed about the Siamese expulsion of the French and ascension of the new king Phetracha in November 1689, more than one year after the actual event. King Louis XIV assigned Father Tachard to return to Siam to bring a new French royal letter to Phetracha to restore Franco–Siamese relations and also to ask Siam to allow the French to settle in Mergui. Tachard reached Pondicherry in 1691. King Phetracha decided to restore relations with France so he released Bishop Laneau and other French subjects from prison, after thirteen months of incarceration. However, Tachard felt himself not ready to ask Siam to cede Mergui to France this time.

In 1693, during the Nine Years' War, the Dutch conquered Pondicherry. Guy Tachard was taken as captive to Holland and was later released. Unwavering, Tachard returned to Ayutthaya 1695 but was denied entry by Kosa Pan who said Tachard, arriving in a mere Portuguese merchant ship, lacked diplomatic credentials. Eventually, Tachard managed to acquire a warship from Pondicherry to enter Siam at Mergui in 1698. Tachard presented Louis XIV's letter from ten years ago in 1689 to King Phetracha in January 1699. However, Tachard did not have enough courage to ask Phetracha to cede Mergui. Phetracha's reply letter was only about blank ceremonial praises on the French king without any actual concessions the French had been hoping for.

=== Persecutions of the eighteenth century ===
Bishop Louis Laneau the Apostolic Vicar of Siam died at Ayutthaya in 1697. Before his death, Bishop Laneau composed Encounter with Buddhist Sage (French: Rencontre avec un sage bouddhiste) as a Christian catechism that criticized Siamese Buddhism in favor of Christianity. In 1700, the new Nguyen Lord Nguyễn Phúc Chu persecuted the Portuguese-affiliated Catholics, leading to an exodus of Vietnamese Catholics from Cochinchina to Chanthaburi in Eastern Siam. In 1702, Bishop Louis Champion de Cicé arrived in Ayutthaya as the new Apostolic Vicar of Siam. In 1711, Bishop Cicé sent Father Huette to found the Immaculate Conception Church at Chanthaburi to accommodate Vietnamese Catholic refugees fleeing persecutions from their homeland.

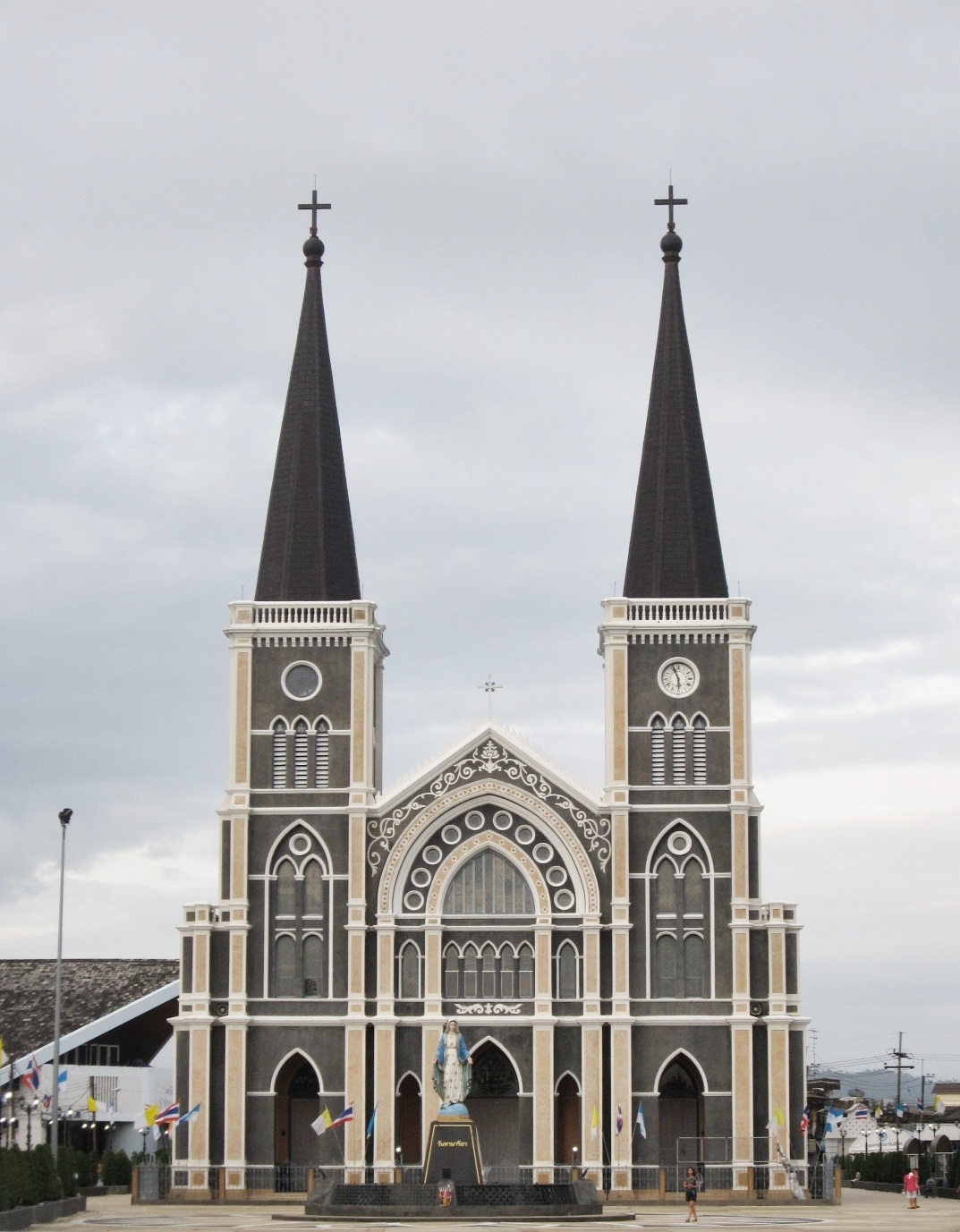
Church of Immaculate Conception in Chanthaburi was founded by French priest Huette in 1711 to accommodate the Vietnamese Catholics fleeing persecutions from their homeland.

Both the Trinh Lords of Northern Vietnam and the Nguyen Lords of Central Vietnam allowed the Catholic missionaries to reside only for commercial benefits accorded with them as presence of French priests attracted French trade activities. However, the Siamese expulsion of the French in 1688 greatly affected the state of French commerce in the region. and the Vietnamese lords found no reasons to allow the French priests to continue to reside in Vietnam. Moreover, the Vietnamese lords also found the overwhelming number of the Vietnamese Catholics, who might listen to the missionaries rather than the Vietnamese lords, to be political threats and France might utilize religion to exert influence over Vietnam.

In 1712, the Trinh Lord Trịnh Cương of Tonkin or Northern Vietnam issued an edict banning Christianity. Any Tonkinese caught practicing Christianity would be tattooed học Hoa Lang đạo (學花郎道, "Study Holland Religion") in their faces. Next year, in 1713, Trịnh Cương expelled all the French Catholic priests from Tonkin. Jacques de Bourges the Apostolic Vicar of Western Tonkin took refuge in Ayutthaya, where he died next year in 1714. Vietnamese persecutions sent waves of religious refugees to Chanthaburi and Ayutthaya.

In 1730, a young Chinese man in Ayutthaya named Laurent Teng, whose father was Chaophraya Phrakhlang Chin the deceased Siamese Trade Minister of Chinese descent and whose mother was a Vietnamese Catholic, who had been entrusted by his mother to be a Catholic at young age, was ordained as a Catholic priest, upsetting his Chinese paternal family, who sought assistance from Prince Phon of the Front Palace, younger brother of the reigning King Thaisa (grandson of Phetracha) of Siam. Prince Phon had Teng flogged with rattan canes and forced Teng to adorn himself in yellow Buddhist monk robes and to trample on a Christian cross. Prince Phon also discovered the Catholic catechism Encounter with Buddhist Sage, composed by the late Bishop Laneau, written in Siamese language using the sacred Khmer script, which could only be used to inscribe Buddhist religious texts, insulting Buddhism. King Thaisa then commissioned Phraya Phichairacha the Phrakhlang or Siamese Foreign Minister, also of Chinese descent, to conduct investigation.

Phicharacha the Phrakhlang Foreign Minister arrested Bishop Tessier de Quéralay the incumbent Apostolic Vicar of Siam and the rest of the French missionaries for the crime of blasphemy on Buddhism. Phicharacha told the French Catholic priests that using the sacred script to write condemnations on Buddhism was a great crime. King Thaisa issued a decree in January 1731 forbidding Catholic missionaries from preaching on native Siamese, Mon, Northern Thai and Lao people, not to 'lure' the said people into Christianity and not to condemn Buddhism. Phichairacha also had a stone stele inscribed with this new law to be placed in front of the Saint Joseph Seminary in Ayutthaya. Unlike Vietnam, Siam did not expel the French missionaries, allowing them to practice their religion but evangelization on the native peoples was prohibited.

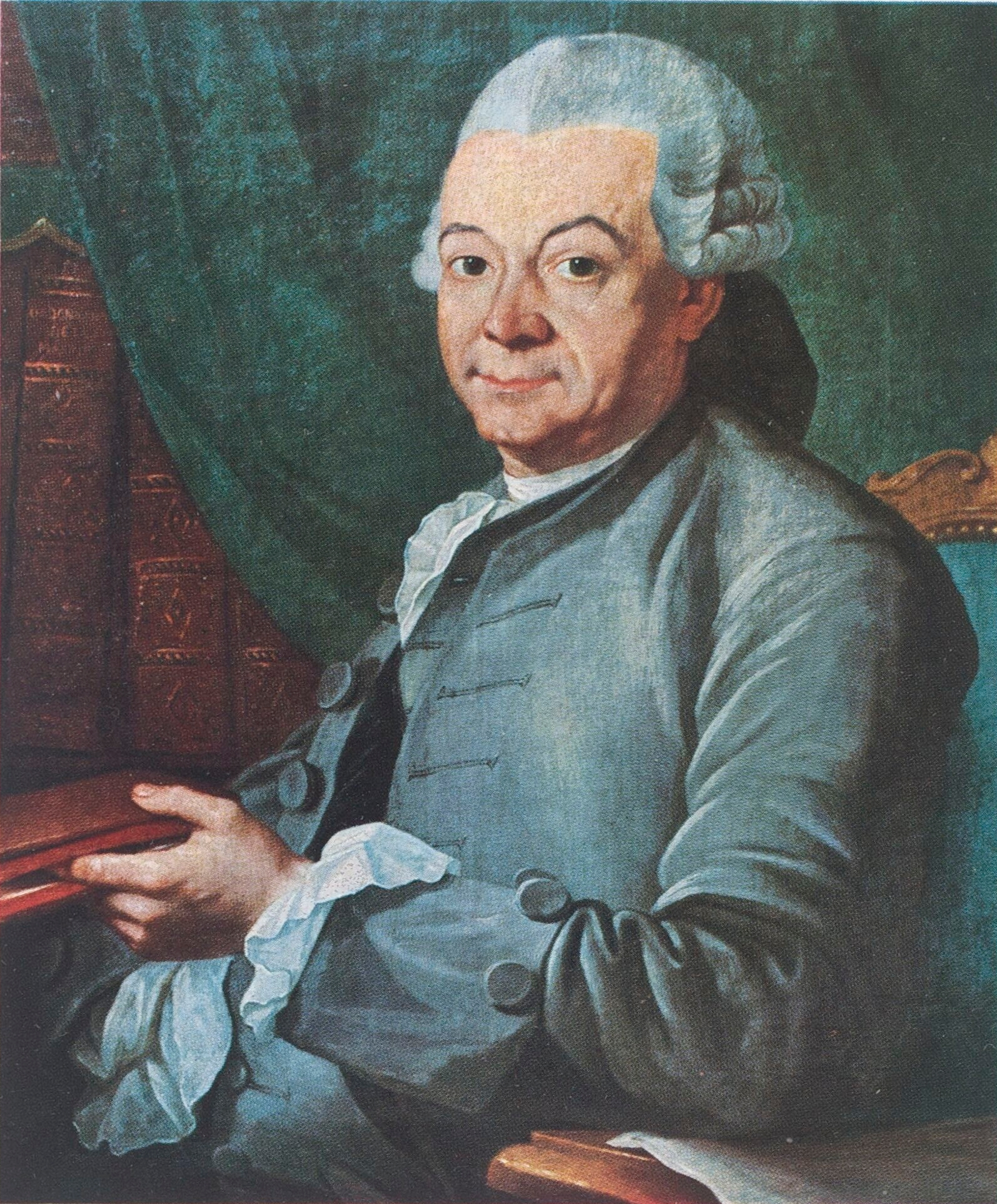
Pierre Poivre, a former-missionary-turned-merchant, attempted to procure a commercial relation with Nguyễn Phúc Khoát the Lord of Cochinchina in 1749 but his mishandling resulted in Cochinchinese expulsion of French missionaries next year in 1750.

By the eighteenth century, the Nguyen Lords had been expanding their dominions into Mekong Delta. French bishop Armand-François Lefebvre of MEP, the newly-appointed Apostolic Vicar of Cochinchina, began his episcopacy by preaching in Saigon in 1743. In 1749, François Dupleix the Governor-General of French India at Pondicherry sent Pierre Poivre as the delegate of the Company to procure a commercial relation with Cochinchina under Nguyen Lord Nguyễn Phúc Khoát. Nguyễn Phúc Khoát, however, did not agree, prompting Poivre to abduct a Vietnamese official who was the French interpreter, angering the Nguyen Lord. Next year, in 1750, Nguyễn Phúc Khoát expelled all French Catholic priests from Cochinchina. Bishop Lefebvre the Apostolic Vicar of Cochinchina had to flee to Prambeichhom near the Cambodian royal capital of Oudong, in 1757, where he died in 1760. Bishop Guillaume Piguel succeeded Lefebvre as the new Apostolic Vicar of Cochinchina, not residing in Cochinchina but rather at Prambeichhom in Cambodia due to the persecution.

In 1765, King Hsinbyushin of Burma sent Burmese armies to lay siege on Ayutthaya. Pierre Brigot the Apostolic Vicar of Siam assigned Father Jean-Baptiste Artaud to bring Saint Joseph seminarians from Ayutthaya to take refuge at Chanthaburi. Father Artaud then brought the seminarians to found a new seminary at Hòn Đất in 1766 in the territory of the Principality of Hà Tiên. Bishop Piguel at Prambeichhom also sent Father Pierre Pigneau de Béhaine from Cambodia to teach at the Seminary of Hòn Đất. Prince Sisang, a refugee Siamese prince, at the suggestion of his Catholic followers, came to seek French aid with Father Artaud at Hòn Đất. Artaud, however, refused to meet with the Siamese prince for fear of political implications. Prince Sisang then proceeded to Prambeichhom, where Bishop Piguel introduced Sisang to take refuge under the King Ang Ton of Cambodia.

Ayutthaya fell to the Burmese invaders in April 1767, destroying the Siamese kingdom. The Seminary of Saint Joseph in Ayutthaya, built in 1665, was destroyed by the Burmese conquerors in 1767. Bishop Pierre Brigot the Apostolic Vicar of Siam was taken by the Burmese as captive to Rangoon in Lower Burma, where he stayed for some time and eventually went to Pondicherry without ever returning to Siam again. Mạc Thiên Tứ the ruler of Hà Tiên, wanting to keep Siamese refugee princes as political leverages against Taksin, the new King of Siam, was angered that Father Artaud let Prince Sisang go to Cambodia without informing him. Mạc Thiên Tứ arrested Father Artaud and Father Pigneau de Béhaine at Hòn Đất, who were imprisoned. Mạc Thiên Tứ then released both French priests on condition that Father Artaud would retrieve Prince Sisang to Hà Tiên. Father Artaud was obliged to go to Oudong in Cambodia, where Prince Sisang refused to return to Hà Tiên. In 1769, Cambodian-Chinese pirates attacked the Hòn Đất Seminary. Father Artaud died during the plunder, while Father Pigneau de Béhaine fled to Pondicherry as the seminary was destroyed. King Taksin of Siam then led Siamese forces to invade Cambodia and attack Hà Tiên in 1771 in search for Prince Sisang.

=== French assistance to Nguyễn Ánh ===
With the death of Bishop Piguel at Prambeichhom in 1771, Pigneau de Béhaine, who had been taking refuge in French India, was appointed to succeed Piguel as the new Apostolic Vicar of Cochinchina in 1774. Pigneau de Béhaine stayed in Hà Tiên rather than in Cambodia. Tây Sơn uprising against the rule of the Nguyen Lords of Cochinchina in Central Vietnam began in 1771, led the three Tây Sơn brothers. As the Tây Sơn toppled Nguyen rule and took control of Central Vietnam, members of the Nguyen Lord Nguyễn Phúc clan moved south to Saigon in Southern Vietnam. In 1777, Nguyễn Huệ, one of the Tây Sơn brothers, seized Saigon and massacred most of the Nguyễn Phúc clan, leaving only Nguyễn Phúc Ánh or Nguyễn Ánh as the sole surviving male member, who fled to Hà Tiên, where Nguyễn Phúc Ánh first met Bishop Pigneau de Béhaine. Nguyễn Ánh managed to return to retake Saigon from the Tây Sơn in the same year. In 1778, the Cambodians attacked Hà Tiên, compelling Bishop De Béhaine to move to Saigon, where De Béhaine became an acquaintance of Nguyễn Ánh.

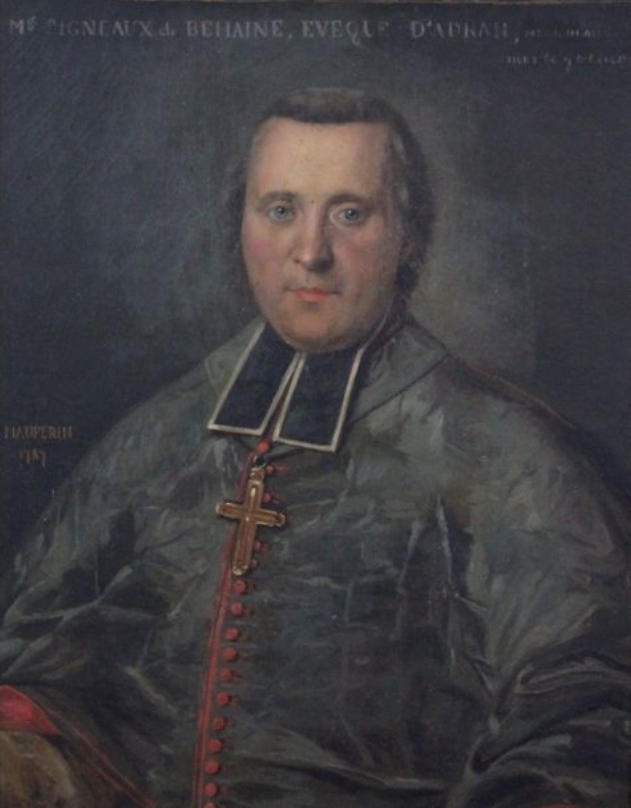
Pierre Pigneau de Béhaine, Bishop of Adran, Apostolic Vicar of Cochinchina, signed the 1787 Treaty of Versailles on behalf of Nguyễn Phúc Ánh, at Versailles in November 1787.

In 1783, the Tây Sơn again seized Saigon and took control of Southern Vietnam. This time, both Nguyễn Ánh and Pigneau de Béhaine had to make their separate journeys to take refuge in Bangkok, Siam. At Bangkok, De Béhaine (called Bá Đa Lộc in Vietnamese writings) offered to arrange for France to help Nguyễn Ánh to regain Vietnam. Nguyễn Ánh then entrusted Bishop De Béhaine with his state seal and his five-year-old eldest son Nguyễn Phúc Cảnh to go to France to ask for French assistance on the behalf of Nguyễn Ánh. Pigneau de Béhaine and Nguyễn Phúc Cảnh left Bangkok in December 1784. De Béhaine reached Pondicherry in French India in February but his journey to France was stalled by uncooperative sentiments of the French authorities.

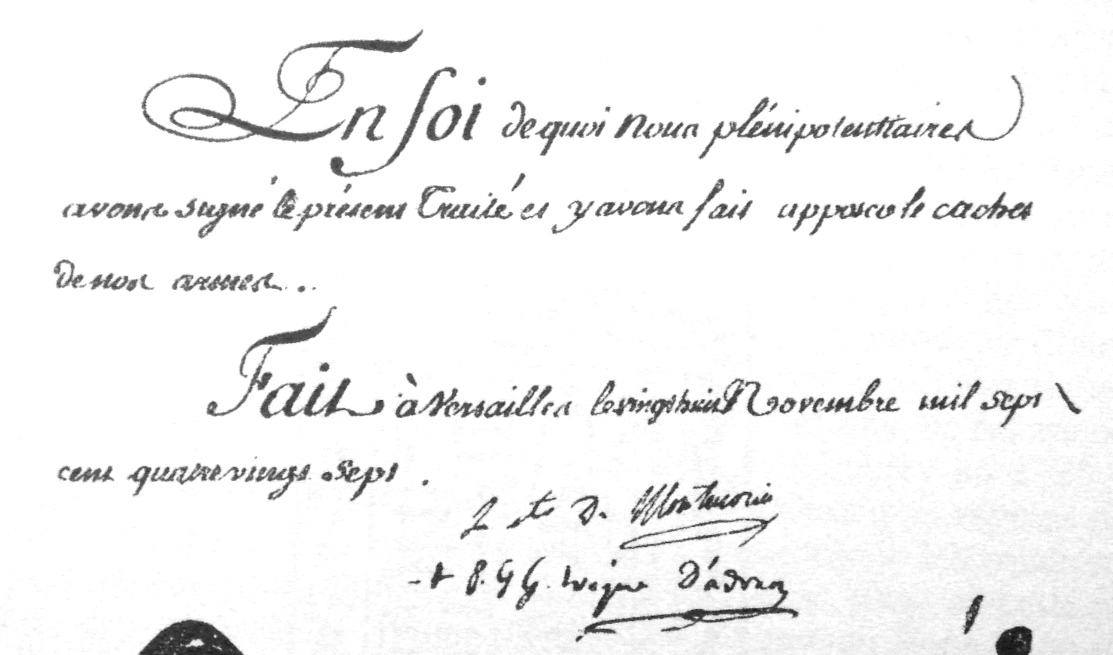
Signature of Bishop Pigneau de Béhaine in the Franco–Cochinchinese Treaty of Versailles (1787), in which France promised to provide military aid to Nguyễn Phúc Ánh, who, in return, ceded Danang and Côn Đảo to France. The treaty terms were not realized and became obsolete upon French refusal to actually help Nguyễn Ánh.

After more than one year in Pondicherry, Bishop De Béhaine and Nguyễn Phúc Cảnh, then six years old, left Pondicherry in July 1786 for France, arriving at Lorient in Brittany in February 1787. De Béhaine took Nguyễn Phúc Cảnh to have an audience with King Louis XVI at the Palace of Versailles in May 1787, where De Béhaine pleaded for the cause of Nguyễn Ánh. The French royal court hesitated about sending military aid to an Asian potentate in a faraway land, as the French government before the French Revolution suffered fiscal problems. After six months, the French royal court finally consented to help Nguyễn Ánh. Treaty of offensive and defensive alliance concluded at Versailles on November 28, 1787, between France and Cochinchina (French: Traité d'alliance offensive et défensive conclu à Versailles, le 28 novembre 1787, entre la France et la Cochinchina), known colloquially in modern historiography as the Treaty of Versailles, was signed by Bishop Pigneau de Béhaine, the Apostolic Vicar of Cochinchina, on behalf of Nguyễn Phúc Ánh the King of Cochinchina, with ten articles. King Louis XVI of France promised to help Nguyễn Ánh by sending four frigates, 1,200 infantrymen, 200 artillerymen and 250 African soldiers. Nguyễn Ánh promised, in return, to cede the port of Danang or Tourane Pulo Condore (Côn Đảo) to France. France imposed trade monopoly on Cochinchina, in which only the French, not any other Western nations, were allowed to trade freely in Cochinchina.

Due to upheaval in Cambodia, Oknha Yomreach Baen, a Cambodian official, took the nine-year-old young king Ang Eng of Cambodia to take refuge in Bangkok under the Siamese king Rama I in 1782. Among many Cambodians who followed King Ang Eng to Bangkok was Keo Ribeiro, a Cambodian–Portuguese Mestizo Catholic man who entered the service under the Siamese king as Phra Wisetsongkhram the commander of Siamese artillery. King Rama appointed Oknha Yomreach Baen as Chaophraya Aphaiphubet as a regent to govern Cambodia on behalf of King Ang Eng, who lived in Bangkok as a refugee and political hostage.

After conclusion of the Treaty, Bishop Pigneau de Béhaine and Nguyễn Phúc Cảnh returned to Pondicherry in French India in December 1788. However, the French royal government sent a confidential order to Thomas Conway the Governor of French India at Pondicherry to abrogate this treaty, refusing to actually help Nguyễn Ánh, for France could not financially support an unnecessary campaign in Asia under such state of fiscal problem. Thomas Conway refused to send French forces to aid Nguyễn Ánh as stipulated in the treaty. This 1787 Versailles Treaty thus became obsolete. Then, the French Revolution happened in 1789.

Nguyễn Huệ, the most prominent of the Tây Sơn brothers, marched north from Huế to successfully seize Thăng Long (modern Hanoi) in 1788, conquering Northern Vietnam, overthrowing the regime of Le-dynasty Emperor and the Trinh Lord and uniting the whole Vietnam from North, Center, to the South under one single rule of the Tây Sơn. Nguyễn Huệ declared himself Emperor Quang Trung during the repulsion of a Qing Chinese invasion in the Battle of Ngọc Hồi-Đống Đa in 1788. However, the two Tây Sơn brothers Nguyễn Nhạc the older brother, who was based at Quy Nhơn and Nguyễn Huệ the younger brother, who was based at Huế, came into an armed conflict, weakening the Tây Sơn. Nguyễn Phúc Ánh, who had been residing in Bangkok for five years, took this opportunity to leave Bangkok in 1787 to renew his reconquest campaign against the Tây Sơn. Nguyễn Ánh successfully took Saigon in 1788 and established his power base on the Mekong Delta of Southern Vietnam.

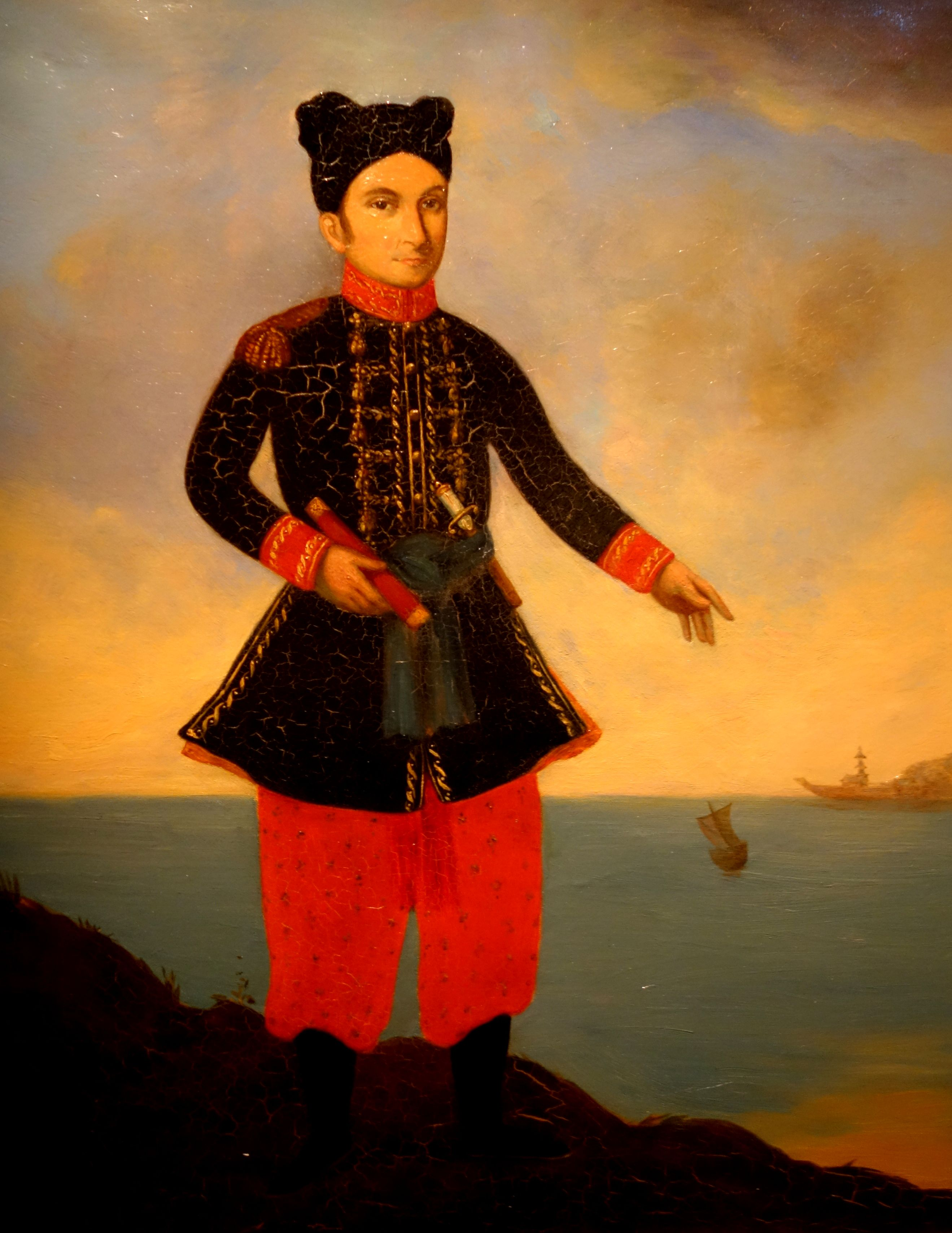
Jean-Baptiste Chaigneau, a French adventurer who helped Nguyễn Phúc Ánh in the war against the Tây Sơn. He was Vietnamized, marrying a Vietnamese wife, receiving a Vietnamese name and continued to serve in Vietnam.

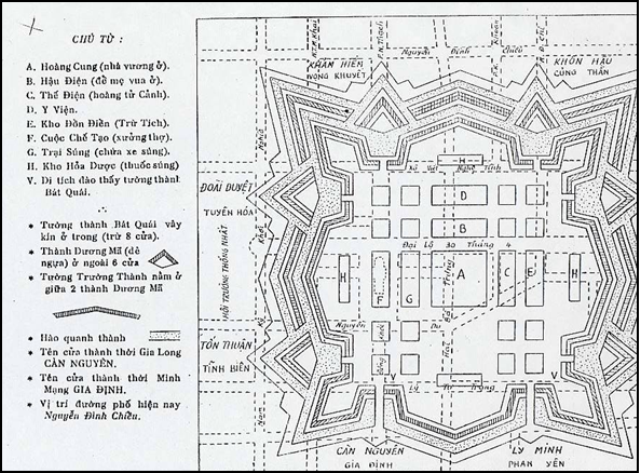
Citadel of Saigon, designed by French engineer Olivier de Puymanel, was built in 1790. This Saigon Citadel later became the stronghold of Lê Văn Khôi rebels and was dismantled by order of Emperor Minh Mạng in 1835 to be replaced by a smaller fort.

As France did not honor the treaty, Bishop Pigneau de Béhaine had to raise his own funds to recruit French adventurers and French naval deserters in India to aid Nguyễn Ánh in Cochinchina, to buy two merchant ships and armed them into warships including Jean-Baptiste Chaigneau and Philippe Vannier. Bishop De Béhaine brought the French volunteer navy to Nguyễn Ánh at Saigon in 1789. Olivier de Puymanel the French engineer and deserter designed the Saigon citadel in Western Vauban model. Jean-Baptiste Chaigneau also trained Nguyễn Ánh's Cochinchinese forces in Western discipline. French contribution to Nguyễn Ánh's navy was crucial but should not be exaggerated as the French constituted only a minority in the Cochinchinese forces. Emperor Quang Trung Nguyễn Huệ of Tây Sơn died in 1792, succeeded by his son Nguyễn Quang Toản.

In 1794, King Rama I of Siam allowed Ang Eng, who had been residing in Bangkok since 1782 for twelve years, to go to assume personal rule in Cambodia as King Noreay Reachea under Siamese domination. The Siamese king also partitioned Northwestern Cambodia, including the srok of Battambang and Siemreap, for Chaophraya Aphaiphubet to govern under direct Siamese administration, not subjected to the King of Cambodia at Oudong, as a reward for Aphaiphubet's devotion to promote Siamese influence in Cambodia. King Noreay Reachea Ang Eng of Cambodia only ruled personally for three years until his premature death from illness at the age of twenty-four in 1797.

Nguyễn Phúc Ánh utilized monsoon winds to propel his fleet northward in his reconquest campaign. Bishop Pigneau de Béhaine took Nguyễn Ánh's son Nguyễn Phúc Cảnh to the battles. Bishop De Béhaine refused to baptize Nguyễn Phúc Cảnh for fear of retributive reaction from Nguyễn Ánh's circle but Nguyễn Phúc Cảnh had already acted as if he were a Christian, refusing to worship his ancestors. In 1799, Nguyễn Phúc Ánh led his fleet to attack Quy Nhơn in Central Vietnam. Pigneau de Béhaine died in October 1799 from illness during this siege of Quy Nhơn. Both Nguyễn Phúc Ánh and his son Nguyễn Phúc Cảnh deeply mourned the death of Bishop Pigneau de Béhaine, who had brought French assistance to Nguyễn Ánh.

After his conquest of Quy Nhơn, Nguyễn Phúc Ánh quickly proceeded northward to successfully take Huế in 1801. However, Nguyễn Phúc Cảnh, the Christian-professing eldest son of Nguyễn Ánh, died from illness, also in 1801. At Huế, Nguyễn Phúc Ánh proclaimed himself Emperor Gia Long in 1802, founding the Nguyen dynasty. Gia Long marched north to seize Thăng Long (Hanoi) in 1802, taking control of Northern Vietnam, uniting the whole country of Vietnam from North to South and ending the Tây Sơn dynasty.

=== Vietnamese persecution on Christians under Minh Mạng ===
In 1806, the Siamese King Rama I enthroned Ang Chan, eldest son of the deceased king Ang Eng, as the new King Outey Thireach Reamea of Cambodia, again under Siamese auspices. Weary of Siamese influences over Cambodia, King Ang Chan turned to the Vietnamese Emperor Gia Long. In 1812, Ang Chan's younger brother Ang Snguon, who as pro-Siam, rebelled against Ang Chan. Siam sent forces into Cambodia to support Ang Snguon, prompting Ang Chan to flee from Oudong the royal capital of Cambodia to take refuge at Saigon in Southern Vietnam under protection of Gia Long. Ang Chan's two other younger half-brothers, the Princes Ang Em and Ang Duong, also decided to join Siam. The Siamese forces burnt down the Cambodian royal city of Oudong and returned, with the pro-Siam Cambodian princes Ang Snguon, Ang Em and Ang Duong, younger brothers of Ang Chan, going with the Siamese to Bangkok. Emperor Gia Long appointed Lê Văn Duyệt as the Viceroy of Saigon to march the Vietnamese forces to bring Ang Chan from Saigon to be restored in Cambodia in 1813. Lê Văn Duyệt built the Banteay Keav citadel at Phnom Penh as the new royal seat for Ang Chan. Ang Chan, with Vietnamese support, resumed his rule in Cambodia, with Cambodia shifted from Siamese to Vietnamese domination.

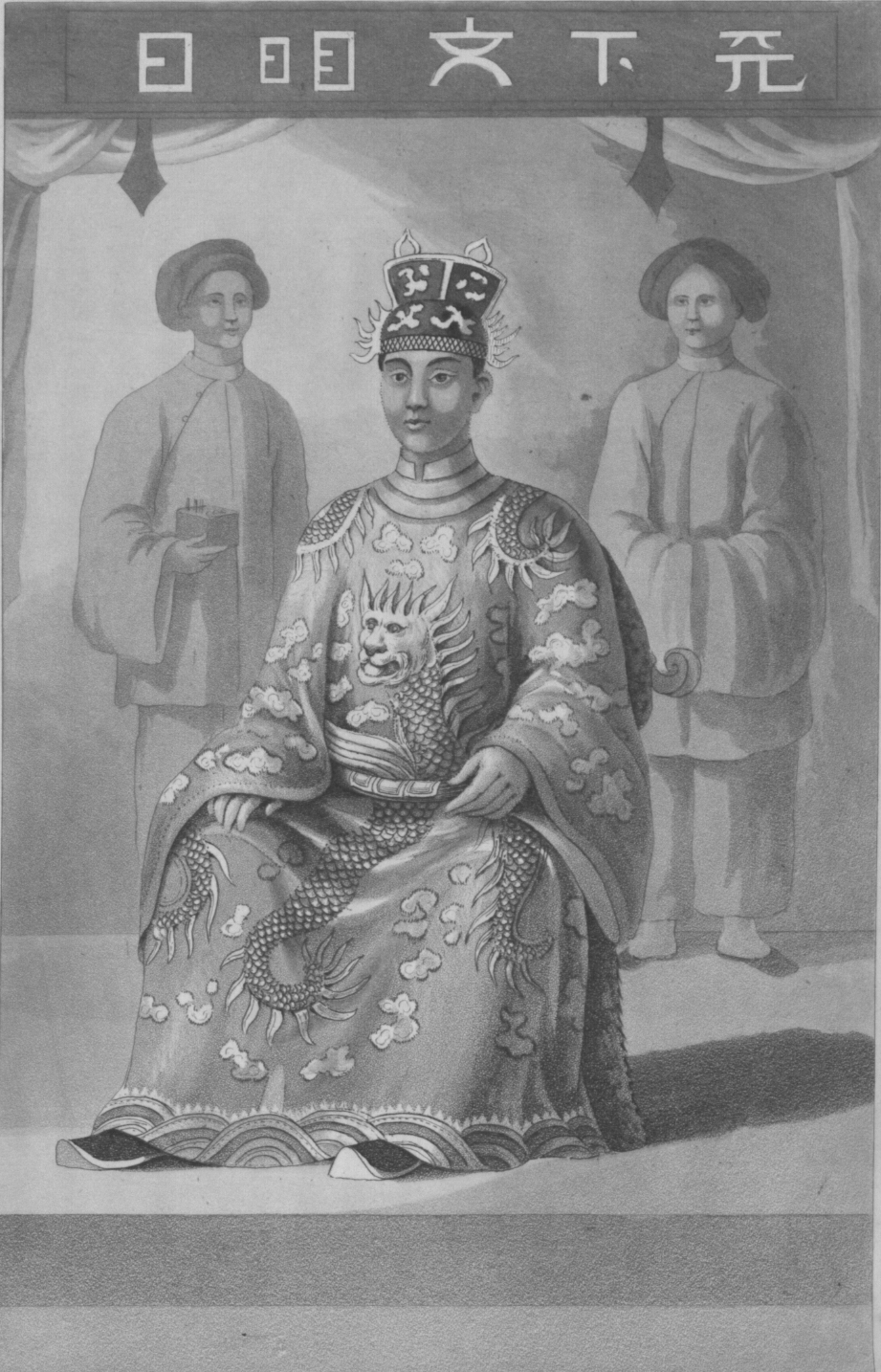
Emperor Minh Mạng ascended the throne in 1820, issued ban on Christianity in 1825, punished the Christians in 1833, bringing Vietnam into the era of Christian persecution.

Even though Emperor Gia Long was a Confucian, he did not persecute the Christians in Vietnam because the emperor had to make use of French men in his reign, just tolerating Christianity but not embracing it either. French adventurers Jean-Baptiste Chaigneau and Philippe Vannier continued to serve in Vietnam as Gia Long's officials. The prospect of having a Christian king in Vietnam, however, died with the death of his Christian-sympathetic eldest son in 1801. Gia Long accorded Lê Văn Duyệt, his comrade during the Tây Sơn Wars, with extensive autonomous powers as the Viceroy of Saigon in Southern Vietnam. Even though the Vietnamese imperial court began to distrust the missionaries, when Gia Long died in 1820, there were up to 300,000 Catholics in Northern Vietnam and 60,000 Catholics in Central and Southern Vietnam combined, becoming a visible minority. Gia Long's other son ascended the Vietnamese throne as Emperor Minh Mạng, who had a staunch Confucian and anti-Western view.

Jean-Baptiste Chaigneau, after his thirty years of service in Vietnam, went to France in 1819 during the Bourbon Restoration period. The French royal government of King Louis XVIII found Chaigneau's connection to Vietnam an opportunity to establish a trade relation with Vietnam. Jean-Baptiste Chaigneau was appointed as the French Consul to Vietnam. However, when Chaigneau returned to Vietnam in 1821, Gia Long had already died and the new emperor Minh Mạng was very antipathic towards Christians and Westerners. Minh Mạng declined Chaigneau's proposal to establish a commercial relation and did not accept Chaigneau as the Consul. With the Vietnamese imperial court turned cold towards Westerners, both Jean-Baptiste Chaigneau and Philippe Vannier resigned, packed up and left Vietnam permanently in 1824, never returning.

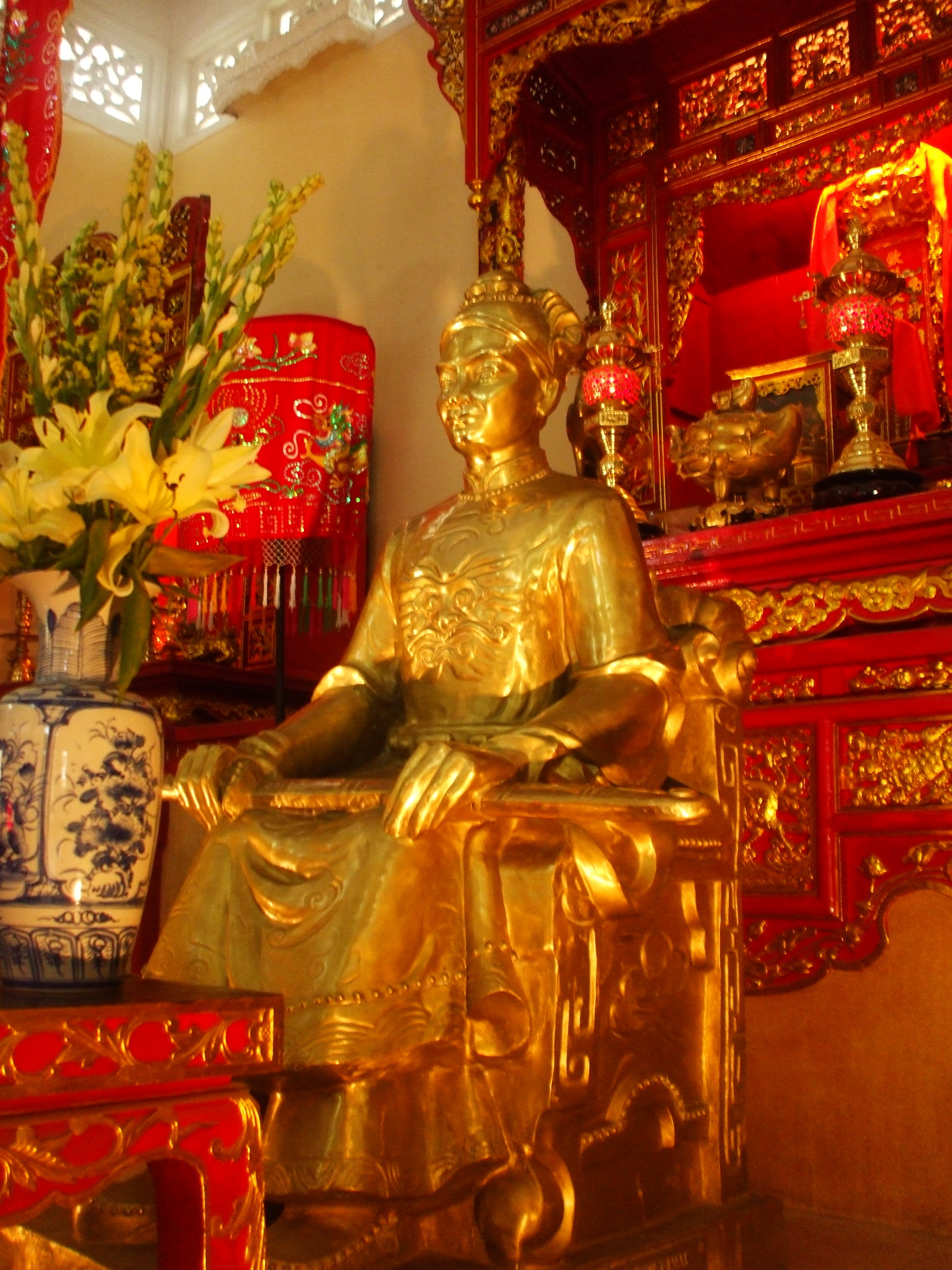
Lê Văn Duyệt the Viceroy of Saigon during the reign of Gia Long and early reign of Minh Mạng, held autonomous powers in Southern Vietnam and protected French missionaries from Christian suppression policies of Minh Mạng.

In February 1825, Emperor Minh Mạng issued a ban on Christianity, declaring that Christianity was a heterodox religion that had no respect for Buddha and ancestors (Buddhism and Confucianism), shaking the very foundation of Vietnam's social order and forbade any Westerners from ever entering Vietnam. Port officials were to search all incoming foreign ships for any Western missionaries who would sneak into Vietnam. Minh Mạng also called for all of existing missionaries in Vietnam to come to Huế under pretext of working as translators to the emperor but Minh Mạng intended to detain all the missionaries under his watch to prevent them from preaching. The power of the new emperor seemed not to extend to Southern Vietnam, where Lê Văn Duyệt protected the missionaries. France sent Eugène Chaigneau, nephew of Jean-Baptiste Chaigneau, to Vietnam again in 1826 but Minh Mạng did not welcome him. In 1828, Lê Văn Duyệt went from Saigon to Huế to urge Minh Mạng to release the missionaries. Even the emperor complied to the powerful Lê Văn Duyệt as Minh Mạng was obliged to release the missionaries.

Death of Lê Văn Duyệt in 1832 left no powerful figures to protect the Christians, leading to full-scale Christian persecution under Minh Mạng. In January 1833, Minh Mạng issued a more severe edict of Christian ban. All Vietnamese Christians were required to immediately leave Christianity and they had to prove themselves by trampling on the Christian cross or else they would face punishments. All Christian churches in Vietnam were to be destroyed. This persecution compelled all French and Spanish Catholic missionaries in Vietnam to go into hiding. Jean-Louis Taberd the Apostolic Vicar of Cochinchina and his assistant Father Étienne Cuenot fled from Saigon to Bangkok, where the Siamese king Rama III welcomed them. Another French MEP priest François-Isidore Gagelin in Southern Vietnam was arrested and executed. In the same year, Lê Văn Khôi, adopted son of the deceased Lê Văn Duyệt, arose in rebellion against Minh Mạng. Majority of the Vietnamese Catholics in Southern Vietnam joined his rebellion. The Lê Văn Khôi rebels took control of all the Six Provinces of Southern Vietnam, establishing their base at the Saigon citadel. Minh Mạng responded by dispatching his own military forces to suppress the rebellion.

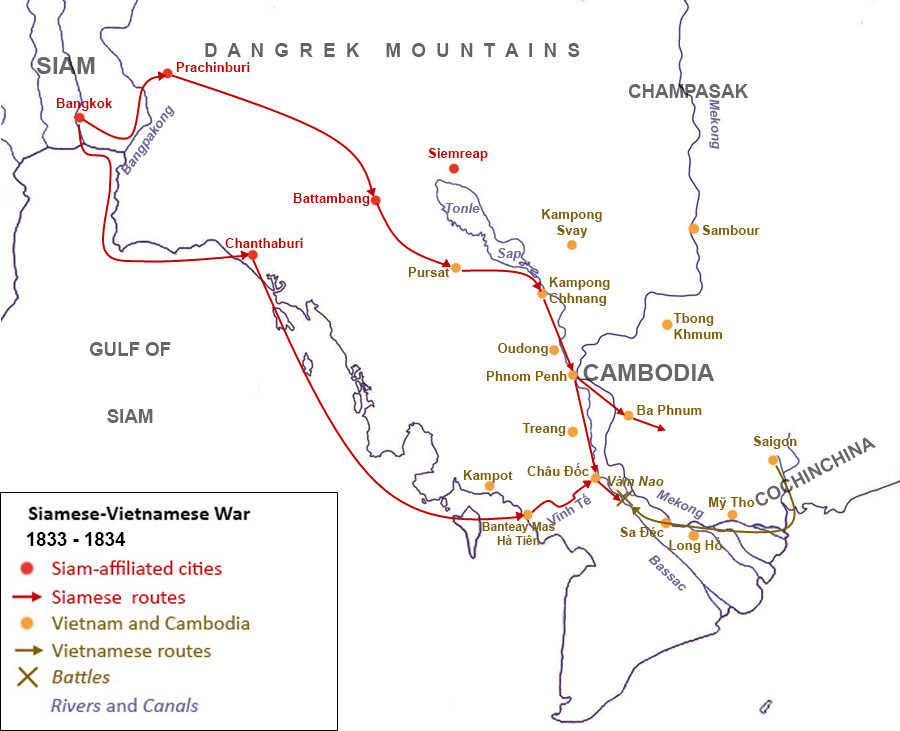
Siamese–Vietnamese War of 1833–1834: In November 1833, Siamese forces conducted a two-pronged attack both by land through Cambodia and by sea at Hà Tiên, only to be defeated by the Vietnamese at Vàm Nao in January 1834.

With ongoing rebellion in Southern Vietnam, the Siamese king Rama III or King Nangklao saw an opportunity to reclaim control over Cambodia and to even push into Southern Vietnam. In November 1833, King Nangklao sent Chaophraya Bodindecha to lead the Siamese land armies to invade Cambodia by land and Chaophraya Phrakhlang Dit Bunnag to lead the Siamese navy to strike at Hà Tiên. The Siamese king ordered the French bishop Jean-Louis Taberd to join the Siamese armies in the campaign. Taberd and his colleague Cuenot instead moved to Singapore. After taking control of Cambodia and Hà Tiên, the Siamese land army under Bodindecha and Siamese navy under Phrakhlang Dit Bunnag joined forces to proceed down the Mekong Delta towards Saigon. Minh Mạng's forces, who had been besieging the rebel-held Saigon, had to allocate forces under Trương Minh Giảng to face the invading Siamese. Trương Minh Giảng defeated the Siamese in the Battle of Vàm Nao on the Mekong in January 1834, prompting the Siamese to retreat. Phra Wisetsongkhram Bento Ribeiro de Albergaria, who inherited his title and position from his grandfather Keo Ribeiro, a Cambodian–Portuguese Mestizo artilleryman under Siamese service, led the Vietnamese Catholics of An Giang province to move to Bangkok, where they were settled in Samsen.

French MEP priest Joseph Marchand was implicated in the Lê Văn Khôi Rebellion and was executed by slow-slicing (凌遲) in November 1835, resulting in his martyrdom.

As the Siamese had retreated, King Nangklao set up the Cambodian prince Ang Em as the governor of Battambang in the Siam-controlled Northwestern Cambodia. The pro-Vietnam King Ang Chan of Cambodia died in 1835 without male heirs. Trương Minh Giảng the Vietnamese resident in Cambodia took this opportunity to exert his influence as Minh Mạng put up a young Cambodian princess Ang Mey, daughter of Ang Chan, as a puppet Queen Regnant of Cambodia at Phnom Penh under Vietnamese influences. Minh Mạng's forces also took Saigon in 1835, putting the end to the rebellion. Joseph Marchand, a French MEP missionary, was found by Minh Mạng's forces among the rebels, became implicated and was executed by slow-slicing in November 1835. In late 1835, Minh Mạng established the Trấn Tây province over Cambodia to impose direct Vietnamese rule and appointed Trương Minh Giảng as Trấn Tây tướng quân (鎮西將軍) or the Governor-General of Cambodia.

In the aftermath of the Lê Văn Khôi Rebellion, Minh Mạng's persecutions of missionaries only increased in intensity. In 1836, Bishop Jean-Louis Taberd appointed Étienne Cuenot as his coadjutor and sent Cuenot to Vietnam for survey. Cuenot found a safe spot in Gò Thị near modern Quy Nhơn. Jean-Charles Cornay, a French Catholic priest preaching in Northern Vietnam, was arrested in 1837 and was executed by decapitation, amputation of limbs and dissection of his body. Joseph Havard the Apostolic Vicar of Western Tonkin died from illness in 1838 during his hiding from Vietnamese authorities. Pope Gregory XVI appointed Pierre Dumoulin-Borie as the new Apostolic Vicar of Western Tonkin but Father Borie was executed before the papal order reached him in Northern Vietnam. Two French MEP missionaries; François Jaccard and Gilles Delamotte, were executed by the Vietnamese in Quảng Trị province in 1838 and 1840, respectively.

== French entry into Southeast Asia ==
=== French Expedition to Danang (1843) ===
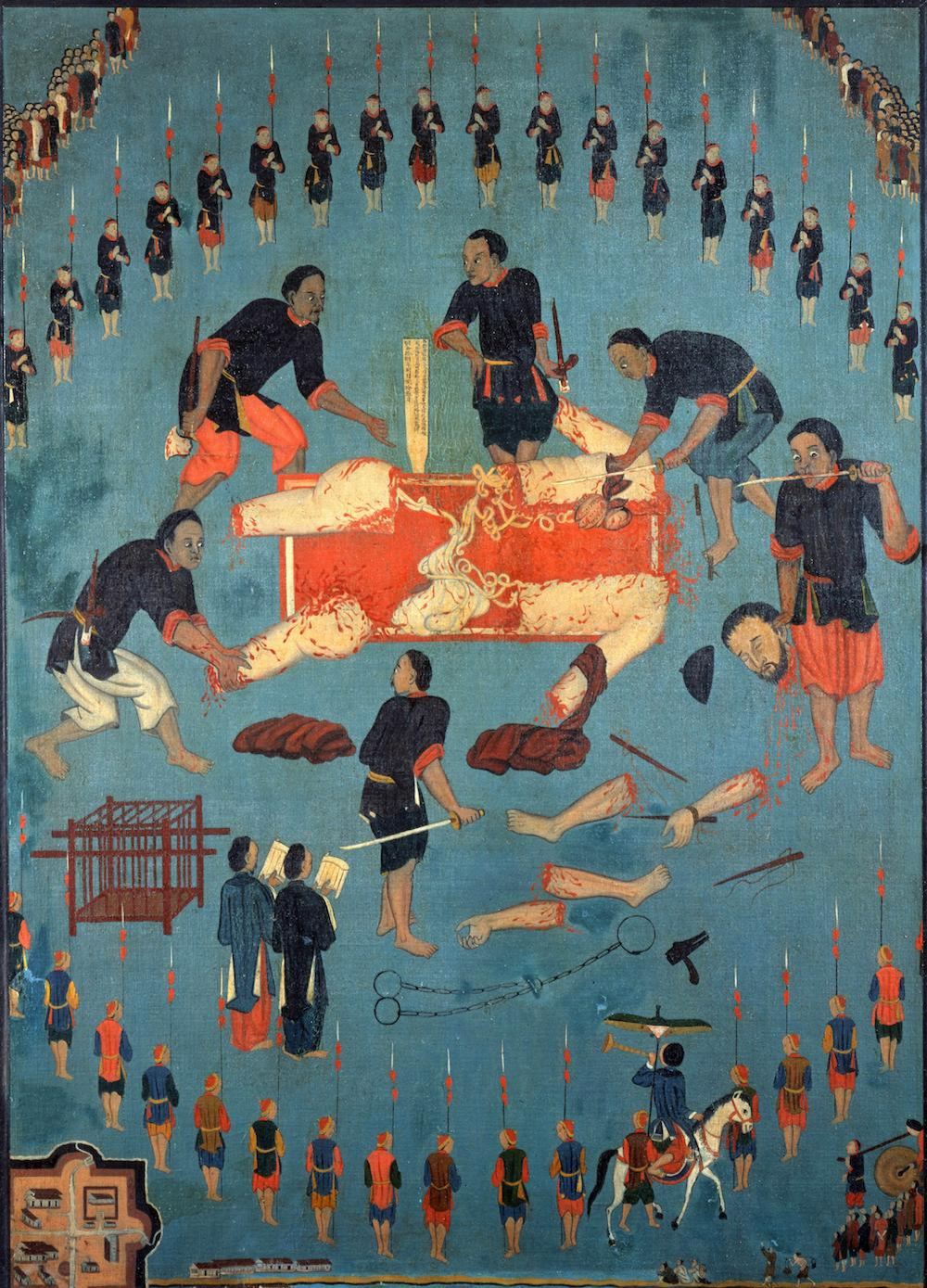
Depiction of execution of French priest Jean-Charles Cornay in Sơn Tây in September 1837, during which his body was dissected, internal organs coming out as the Vietnamese executioner reportedly ate a piece of his liver.

Bishop Jean-Louis Taberd, who had taken refuge in Singapore, sent two MEP priests Jean-Claude Miche and Pierre Duclos to preach in Siam-controlled Battambang in Northwestern Cambodia in 1838. Taberd was then appointed as Apostolic Vicar of Bengal and moved to Calcutta in British India and Pope Gregory XVI appointed new Apostolic Vicars to Vietnam;

- Étienne Cuenot at Gò Thị in Central Vietnam was appointed to succeed Taberd as the new Apostolic Vicar of Cochinchina.
- Pierre-André Retord of MEP in Sơn Tây was appointed as the new Apostolic Vicar of Western Tonkin.

In 1839, Pope Gregory issued papal brief Quod nuncia praising the Catholics of Vietnam for their endurance of persecutions by the Vietnamese imperial court. In mid-1839, a conflict broke out between the British Empire and Qing-dynasty China, resulting in the First Opium War. Upon learning about the British prevail over China, Emperor Minh Mạng of Vietnam realized military prowess and potential threats of Westerners, prompting the Vietnamese Emperor to seek an amicable relation with France. In late 1839, Minh Mạng dispatched two Vietnamese envoys Trần Viết Xương and Tôn Thất Thường in a diplomatic mission to France.

Also in December 1839, the Cambodian prince Ang Em, who had been set up by the Siamese as the governor of Battambang, rebelled against Siam and went to Phnom Penh to defect to Trương Minh Giảng the Vietnamese commissioner of Trấn Tây province. Due to this upheaval in Battambang, Father Miche and Father Duclos moved from Battambang to Penang to take refuge. In mid-1840, Emperor Minh Mạng dethroned Ang Mey the puppet Queen of Cambodia in his effort to annex Cambodia into Vietnam, exiling her to Saigon. Dissatisfied with Vietnamese cultural assimilation policies, the Cambodians arose in a nationwide uprising against Vietnamese rule in September 1840. The Siamese armies under Chaophraya Bodindecha took this opportunity to intervene by supporting this Cambodian uprising against Vietnam.

The two Vietnamese envoys, Trần Viết Xương and Tôn Thất Thường, reached Brest in Brittany in November 1840 and then proceeded to Paris. France was then under the July Monarchy of King Louis-Philippe of the Orléans dynasty. This Vietnamese mission, drawing sensation in Paris, proposed a commercial relation with France. However, the Paris Foreign Missions Society took this opportunity to relay grievances against Vietnam's violent persecutions of the French missionaries and Vietnamese Catholics to the French government. Pope Gregory XVI himself also pleaded the French king Louis-Phillippe to use French military power to put the end to Vietnam's Catholic persecutions. Pressured by the Catholic Church, King Louis-Phillippe refused to receive the Vietnamese envoys. The Vietnamese envoys then left France empty-handed. The Protestant French Foreign Minister François Guizot declared that France was not responsible for actions and safety of French missionaries in Asia, saying that the missionaries had brought themselves into the risks. French public opinion, however, was sympathetic to the missionaries and supportive of French intervention on behalf of the French missionaries in Asia.

Emperor Minh Mạng died in January 1841, succeeded by his son the new emperor Thiệu Trị. The Siamese under Bodindecha installed Ang Duong the Cambodian prince as their own candidate in Oudong against the Vietnamese. Under the new Vietnamese Emperor, more French missionaries sneaked into Vietnam and were arrested;

- Two French priests Jean-Paul Galy-Carles and Siméon Berneux, from Macau, entered Northern Vietnam and were arrested in Kim Sơn, Ninh Bình province.
- French priest Pierre Charrier was arrested in Sơn Tây to the northwest of Hanoi.
- Jean-Claude Miche and Pierre Duclos joined Bishop Cuenot the Apostolic Vicar of Cochinchina at Gò Thị in Central Vietnam.

In September 1841, Pope Gregory issued the papal brief Universi Dominici dividing the Apostolic Vicariate of Siam into Apostolic Vicariate of Western Siam based at Singapore and Apostolic Vicariate of Eastern Siam based at Assumption Church in Bangkok. Jean-Baptiste Pallegoix the Bishop of Mallus was appointed as the first Apostolic Vicar of Eastern Siam in this new division.

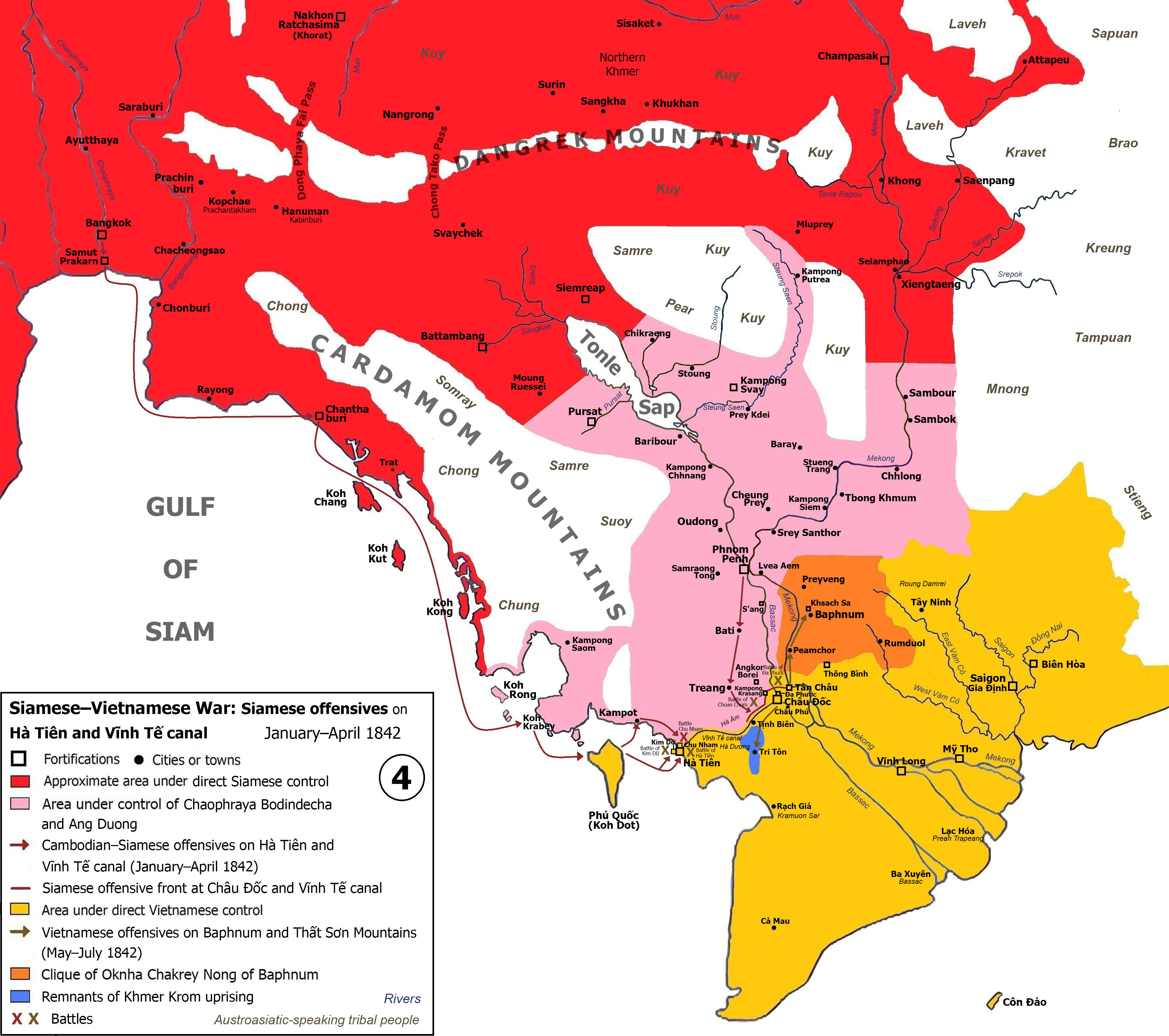
In early 1842, the Siamese navy led by Prince Itsaret Rangsan and Chuang Bunnag attacked the Vietnamese port of Hà Tiên, temporarily taking position at Phú Quốc Island. However, this Siamese amphibious assault was repelled by the Vietnamese.

Facing strong Cambodian resistance with Siamese support, the Vietnamese were obliged to evacuate from Cambodia in November 1841, ending the period of direct Vietnamese rule over Cambodia as Trấn Tây province, with Trương Minh Giảng the Vietnamese Commissioner of Cambodia allegedly committed suicide. Siam was able to resume control over Cambodia. In early 1842, the Siamese king Rama III or King Nangklao assigned his younger half-brother Prince Itsaret Rangsan, along with Chuang Bunnag, to lead the Siamese navy to attack Hà Tiên. The Siamese navy temporarily took position at Vietnam's Phú Quốc Island as they proceeded to attack Hà Tiên. However, the Siamese naval attack on Hà Tiên was repelled by the Vietnamese and the Siamese retreated. Also in early 1842, Bishop Cuenot at Gò Thị sent Father Miche and Father Duclos to proselytize on the Montagnard people including the Jarai people, Rade people and the Mnong people on the Central Vietnamese Highlands. However, Father Miche and Duclos were arrested by the Vietnamese authorities before reaching their destination.

Five French MEP priests; Jean-Paul Galy-Carles, Siméon Berneux, Pierre Charrier, Jean-Claude Miche and Pierre Duclos, were incarcerated in Huế, where they were beaten with rattan canes in judiciary procedures. In 1842, the Vietnamese Emperor Thiệu Trị sentenced all of the five French missionaries to death. Unlike his father Minh Mạng, however, Thiệu Trị was more cautious in dealing with the missionaries. Thiệu Trị reprieved the death sentences of the five priests. In fact, not a single Western missionary was executed during Thiệu Trị's reign, in contrast with his father Minh Mạng and his son Tự Đức. Meanwhile, there happened to be a French frigate Héroïne patrolling in the China Sea. Napoléon Libois the procurator of the Paris Foreign Mission in Macau, informed about the imprisonment of five MEP priests in Vietnam, asked capitaine de corvette Félix Favin-Lévêque the commander of the Héroïne to rescue the missionaries.

Without consulting the French government, acting on his own initiative, capitaine de corvette Félix Favin-Lévêque (Y Lê Viết Ca) brought the Héroïne to Danang in February 1843, threatening the Vietnamese imperial court to release the five missionaries or Favin-Lévêque would anchor at Huế Imperial Palace. Ngụy Khắc Tuần, a local official in Quảng Nam province, however, told Emperor Thiệu Trị that France had sent someone to apologize for the crimes of the French missionaries and ask to take them back. Out of mercy, Thiệu Trị granted to allow the five French MEP priests to leave Vietnam with Favin-Lévêque on the Héroïne in March 1843 on condition that they would never return to Vietnam again. Even though no armed clashes happened, the expedition of Favin-Lévêque to Danang in early 1843 was the first of five successive French expeditions to Danang (1843, 1845, 1847, 1856 and 1858) to intervene on behalf of the missionaries, with some of them turned violent. As Favin-Lévêque managed to rescue all the five French priests to safety, dropping off Father Duclos at Singapore, Father Miche at Penang and others at Réunion. However, three of the five priests; Galy, Miche and Duclos, would soon return to Vietnam.

=== Lagrené Mission and Treaty of Whampoa (1844) ===
Charles de Montigny was born in 1805. Montigny's father used to serve Prince Comte de Provence, younger brother of King Louis XVI of France. During the French Revolution, as an émigré, Montigny's father took refuge in Hamburg in Germany, where Montigny was born. Only when Comte de Provence ascended the restored French throne as King Louis XVIII in 1814 that Montigny's family was able to return to France in 1815. At the age of eighteen, Montigny became a soldier and joined the French Invasion of Spain in 1823. Montigny then, without his family's approval, became a Philhellene, going to fight in the Greek War of Independence in 1827 under French commander Charles Nicolas Fabvier, who lauded Montigny's distinct bravery, rescuing another French commander from the encirclement of the enemies. Montigny continued his service under Fabvier for some time until he shifted his career to diplomacy, entering the Ministry of Marines.

British prevail over Qing China in the aftermath of the First Opium War made both Siam and Vietnam realized superior military prowess and potential threats of the incoming Westerners. British success in the Far East also urged France to find its own way to establish influence in Asia, emulating the British, not to be left behind. During the Sino–British negotiation of the Nanking Treaty, the French Foreign Minister François Guizot sent a French observatory mission to China, led by capitaine de vaisseau Jean-Baptiste Cécille, to Canton (Guangzhou) in order to explore potential diplomatic and commercial relations with China. In January 1842, in a confidential meeting, Yishan the Viceroy of Liangguang offered concessions and privileges to France in exchange for French support to China in conflicts with Britain, to which Jean-Baptiste Cécille replied that France could not act against Britain without a pretext. Nevertheless, the Chinese seemed to expect France to counter British influences.

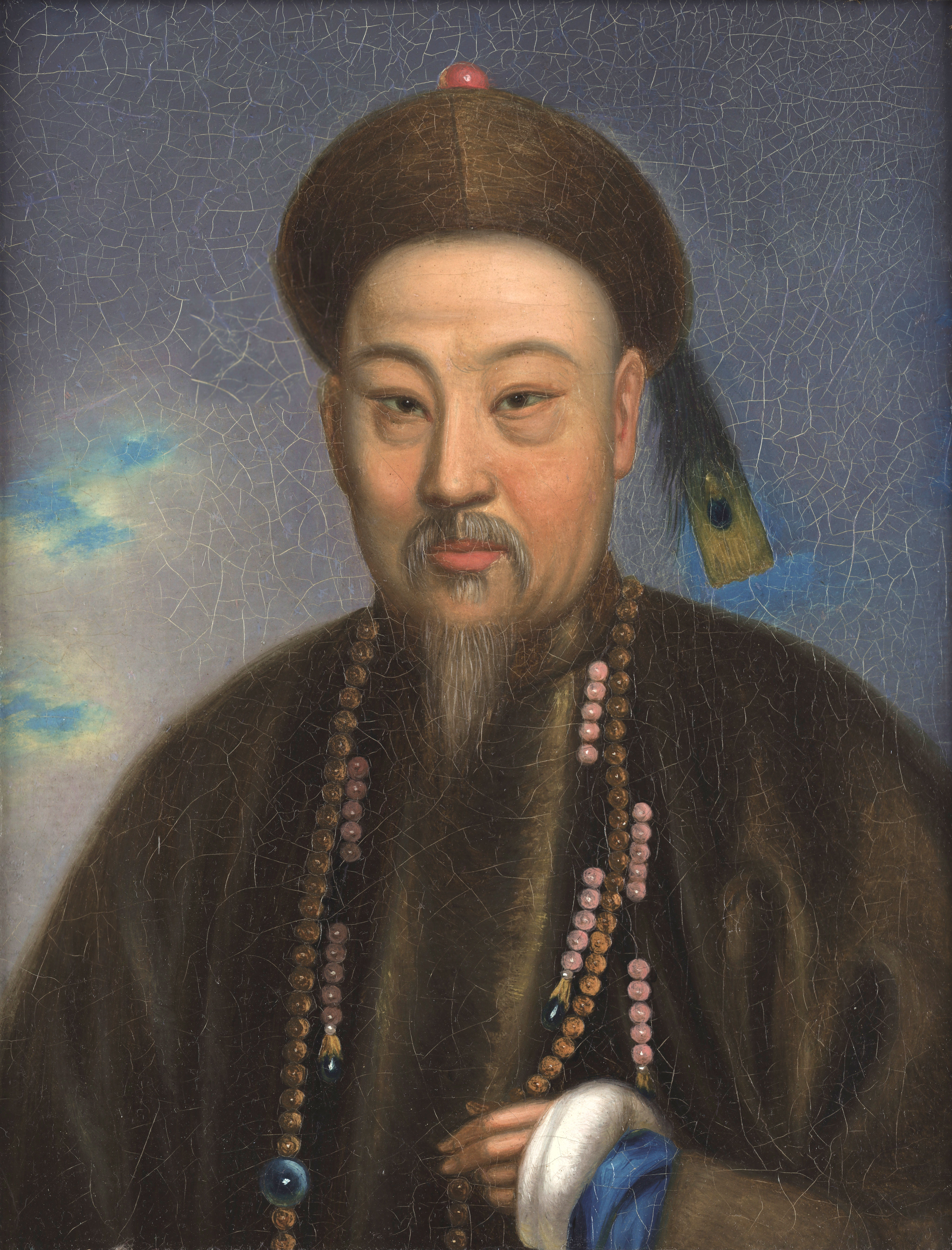
Keying or Qiying (耆英), the chief negotiator and signatory of Sino–British Treaty of Nanking (1842) and Sino–French Treaty of Whampoa (1844). He was later sentenced to death during the Second Opium War in 1858.

In the aftermath of First Opium War, the British compelled the Qing imperial court to conclude the Treaty of Nanking (南京條約), to which Emperor Daoguang appointed Keying or Qiying, a member of the imperial Aisin-Goro clan, to be the chief negotiator and plenipotentiary. The Nanking Treaty was concluded in August 1842, which abolished the monopoly of Cohong merchants in Canton by allowing the British to trade freely in five mentioned ports and the British were also permitted to establish consulates in those five ports. As Keying arrived in Canton, he concluded Treaty of the Bogue (虎門條約) with the British in June 1843, which stipulated fixed duty rates for each individual trade articles (any articles not mentioned would be subjected to the general rule of five-percent import duty) and established British extraterritorial jurisdiction in the five ports.

In November 1843, François Guizot the French Foreign Minister assigned Théodose de Lagrené as the French plenipotentiary to conclude a treaty with China in similar manner to the British Treaty of Nanking. Montigny joined this diplomatic mission of Théodose de Lagrené to Asia in Montigny's first-time arrival in the region. The Lagrené Mission arrived in Macau in August 1844. Keying, then Viceroy of Liangguang and chief negotiator of all treaties China was to make with Western nations, was the plenipotentiary and signatory on the Chinese part. The Treaty of Whampoa or Treaty of Huangpu (黃埔條約) was signed on 24 October 1844 between China and France as an unequal treaty. The treaty terms included;

- Article 2 allowed the French to trade freely at five ports; Canton, Amoy, Fuzhou, Ningbo and Shanghai, in the same manner as the British.
- Article 4 allowed France to establish consulates in the five ports mentioned.
- Article 6 stipulated fixed rates of import and export duties for each individual articles and China was forbidden to raise any duty rates fixed in this treaty. Any trading goods not mentioned would be subjected to the general rule of five-percent import duty (compare Siam's three-percent fixed import duty on all articles).
- This Whampoa Treaty did not directly stipulate the freedom of Christian proselytization. Article 22 only stated that France was allowed to build churches in the five ports.
- Article 27 stipulated that, in case of conflict between a Chinese and a French, the Chinese authorities would arrest the Chinese subject to be put under Chinese judiciary system and the French consular authority would arrest the French subject to be judged according to the French law.
- Article 28 stipulated that the Chinese authorities had no power to intervene in conflict between the French or between the French and another Western subject. The Chinese also had no power over French ships and French naval crew.

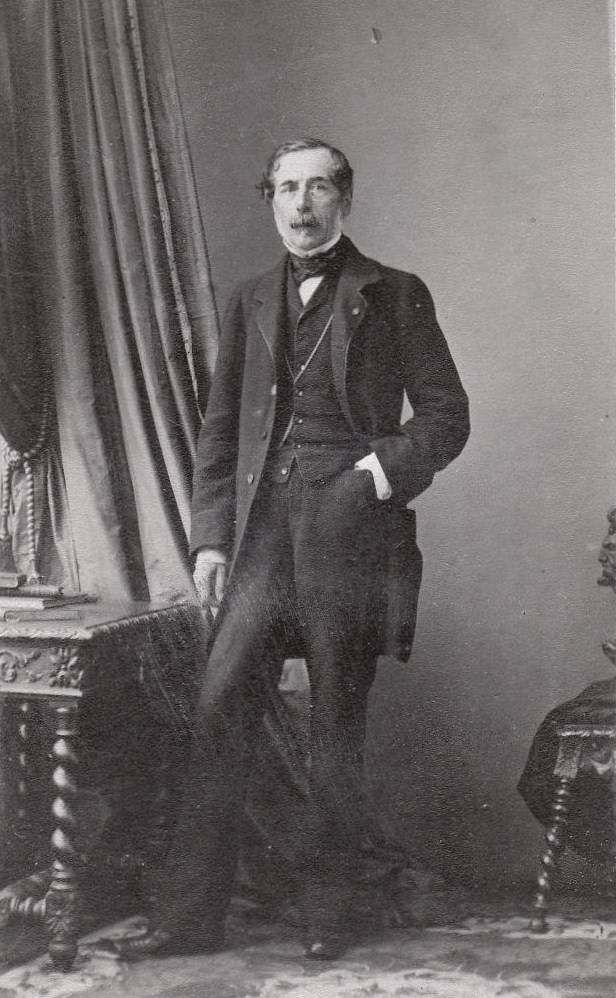
Théodose de Lagrené the French envoy who concluded Treaty of Whampoa (1844) with China and was instrumental in pushing for Christian legalization in China in 1846.

Unlike the British, France had no commercial interests in China and strove to put forward religious issues to further France's role. Lagrené, at his own initiative and suggested by Keying himself, pushed for the legalization of Christianity in China. There were around 240,000 Christians in China at the time, mostly Catholics. Keying supported Christian legalization as it would secure French support for China against Britain. Keying had to present many memorials to Emperor Daoguang, who conceded to lift all bans on Christianity in China in December 1844.

Théodose de Lagrené, however, was not satisfied as he demanded the Qing imperial court to explicitly stipulate full toleration. In 1845, Lagrené, joined by Montigny, went on a tour to explore the five treaty ports. Lagrené complained to Keying that he had not seen a single poster announcing the legalization of Christians in the five ports he had visited. Keying convinced the Emperor to comply to the French demand because, if not, France would become another antagonistic nation towards China like Britain. Eventually, Daoguang issued an edict in February 1846 permitting Chinese people to practice Christianity without being punished. However, Daoguang's legalization of Christianity was not honored by local Chinese officials, who continued to persecute Christians, leading to the French participation in the Second Opium War. The Lagrené Mission, which included Montigny, left China at Macau in January 1846 to return to France.

=== French Expedition to Danang (1845) ===
The Sino–French Whampoa Treaty concluded by Théodose de Lagrené in 1844 marked the advent of grounded French presence in the Far East. French Naval Station in the China Seas (French: station navale des mers de Chine) was founded at Macau in 1844, to which capitaine de vaisseau Jean-Baptiste Cécille, who was promoted to Rear Admiral, was appointed as the commander. Also in 1844, French missionaries sneaked into Vietnam again;

- Jean-Claude Miche, one of the five priests who had just been rescued from Vietnam by the frigate Héroïne in 1843, returned to Vietnam, residing in Lái Thiêu near Saigon in Southern Vietnam.
- Dominique Lefebvre the Bishop of Isauropolis, coadjutor to Bishop Cuenot of Cochinchina, entered Vietnam to preach in Vĩnh Long province in Southern Vietnam.

Due to frequent persecutions of Western missionaries by the Vietnamese imperial court, Pope Gregory XVI issued papal brief Exponendum Nobis curavit dividing the Apostolic vicariate of Cochinchina into two vicariates;

- Apostolic vicariate of Eastern Cochinchina, corresponding to Central Vietnam, under Bishop Étienne Cuenot at Gò Thị in Central Vietnam.
- Apostolic vicariate of Western Cochinchina, corresponding to Southern Vietnam, granted to Bishop Dominique Lefebvre.

However, in December 1844, Dominique Lefebvre, who had not yet aware of his new apostolic appointment, was arrested by the Vietnamese in Vĩnh Long and was taken for judiciary trial at Huế, where Lefebvre was sentenced to death but again his death penalty was reprieved by the Vietnamese Emperor Thiệu Trị.

In May 1845, John Percival, an American navy officer on his circumnavigation tour in his frigate USS Constitution, arrived in the Vietnamese port of Danang, proposing for a trade relation. Dominique Lefebvre, in Vietnamese prison in Huế, wrote a letter and had a Vietnamese Catholic secretly deliver to Percival, pleading Percival to rescue him. After reading Lefebvre's letter, Percival led eighty American marines to capture three Vietnamese officials as hostages, calling for the release of French Bishop Lefebvre. Vietnamese imperial court, however, tricked Percival by saying that the Vietnamese would release Lefebvre when Percival released the Vietnamese hostages. Percival then released the Vietnamese hostages but the Vietnamese did not release Lefebvre. As he failed to retrieve the French bishop, John Percival informed Rear Admiral Cécille the commander of French China Seas station at Macau about the captivity of Bishop Lefebvre in Vietnam.

Upon learning of Bishop Lefebvre's incarceration in Vietnam, Rear Admiral Cécille at Macau commissioned capitaine de frégate Fournier-Duplan to led the French frigate Alcmène from Singapore to Danang in June 1845, where Fournier-Duplan (Đô Rắp Lăng) delivered Cécille's letter asking the Vietnamese imperial court to release Lefebvre. The tone of the letter was rather reconciliatory, not aggressive. Ngụy Khắc Tuần again told the Emperor Thiệu Trị that the French had come to politely ask and plead for the release of Lefebvre. Thiệu Trị then consented to the release of Bishop Dominique Lefebvre, who was taken by Fournier-Duplan on the Alcmène to Singapore. Upon release, the Vietnamese told Lefebvre that "The emperor considers that you, a foreigner, had not full knowledge of the laws prohibiting the Christian religion. Therefore, the emperor pardons you and sends you back to your king."

Cambodia was then under Siamese domination led by the Siamese commander Chaophraya Bodindecha. In July 1845, Nguyễn Tri Phương the governor of An Giang and Hà Tiên provinces in Southern Vietnam led the Vietnamese riparian fleet to attack Southeastern Cambodia in effort to reclaim Vietnamese control over Cambodia, proceeding to capture Phnom Penh in September 1845. The combined Cambodian–Siamese forces, unable to resist Vietnamese invasion, retreated to Oudong, where the Siamese commander Bodindecha and Ang Duong the pro-Siamese Cambodian potentate led the defenses against the Vietnamese. Nguyễn Tri Phương led the Vietnamese fleet to attack Oudong in September but the Siamese and Cambodians were able to repel the assault. The Siamese–Vietnamese War of 1845 protracted around the vicinity of Oudong, with each side unable to prevail over the other. Eventually, in December 1845, both the Siamese and the Vietnamese in Cambodia agreed to peace, in which Vietnam would accept Ang Duong as King of Cambodia and Ang Duong would send tributes to both Siam and Vietnam.

Capitaine de frégate Fournier-Duplan delivered Bishop Dominique Lefebvre to Singapore in April 1846. At Singapore, however, Dominique Lefebvre was informed about his apostolic appointment to the newly-created Vicariate of Western Cochinchina so Lefebvre was poised to return to Vietnam. After just one month in Singapore, Dominique Lefebvre departed from Singapore in May along with Father Pierre Duclos, one of the five priests rescued in 1843 three years earlier, for Southern Vietnam, his vicariate jurisdiction. Both Lefebvre and Duclos attempted to reach Lái Thiêu to join Father Miche there but were arrested by the Vietnamese on their journey. Lefebvre and Duclos were taken to Huế, Lefebvre's second time just one year after being rescued, where both were subjected to judiciary tortures. Father Duclos died during the interrogations. However, the Vietnamese court, contemplating French intervention, decided to send Dominique Lefebvre off on a British merchant ship to Singapore in March 1847.

=== French Bombardment of Danang (1847) ===
Apart from Vietnam, Rear Admiral Cécille the commander of the French navy at Macau also brought French complaints on treatment of missionaries to other Asian polities including Joseon Korea. Korea had earlier executed three French MEP priests in 1839. Korea and Vietnam, both anti-Western Confucian states, had been systemically persecuting Christians and the missionaries with vigor. Cécille visited the Ryukyu Kingdom in June 1846, where Théodore Forcade the Apostolic Vicar of Japan had been residing, to establish a trade relation but did not succeed. Cécille also visited Nagasaki in July, where he was received with unwelcomeness by the Japanese authorities. Cécille ended up at Oeyeondo Island of Korea near Boryeong in August 1846, where he attempted to deliver a letter demanding explanation of Korean execution of French priests seven years ago and the release of Korean Catholic priest Andrew Kim Taegon. Korean officials refused to receive the letter, leaving the letter on the rocks.

In early 1847, King Ang Duong of Cambodia sent Cambodian envoys to bring tributary submission to Emperor Thiệu Trị, professing to be a vassal of Vietnam. The Cambodian envoys reached Huế in March 1847, having an audience with the Vietnamese Emperor, who accepted Ang Duong as King of Cambodia under Vietnamese vassalage.

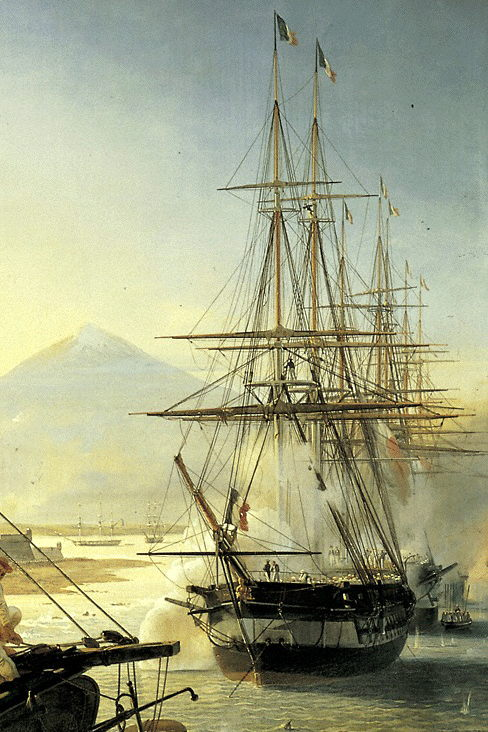
French frigate Gloire during the Battle of Veracruz (1838) in the Franco-Mexican War

Rear Admiral Cécille at Macau, upon knowing of Bishop Dominique Lefebvre's second incarceration at Huế, commissioned his subordinates capitaine de vaisseau Augustin de Lapierre to command the French frigate Gloire and capitaine de frégate Charles Rigault de Genouilly to command the Victorieuse to bring those two French warships to Danang. Cécille then resigned from his position as the commander of French navy in China Seas, leaving Lapierre to succeed him and returned to France. Lapierre the new commander of French China Seas Station, along with his subordinate Rigault de Genouilly, left Macau in March 1847 with the two French frigates Gloire and Victorieuse, arriving in Danang, also called Tourane, in April.

This French expedition to Danang in 1847 was different from the two previous occasions (in 1843 and 1845) that this time the French did not only call for the release of missionaries. At Danang, Lapierre (Lạp Biệt Nhĩ) also urged the Vietnamese court to grant freedom and safety and to cease persecutions of the Christians. Emperor Thiệu Trị sent Lý Văn Phức from the Ministry of Rites to negotiate with Lapierre. The meeting took place at Danang government house. Lapierre gave his letter, written with Chinese characters, to Lý Văn Phức, who refused to take the letter. Enraged, Lapierre shouted at Lý Văn Phức, leaving his letter on the chair and leave. Lý Văn Phức did not dare to receive the letter from Lapierre and also did not dare to destroy the letter, not knowing what to do, so he returned to Huế. Thiệu Trị saw that Lý Văn Phức cowered before the French, disgracing Vietnam, so Thiệu Trị ordered Lý Văn Phức punished and imprisoned.

As tension escalated, Emperor Thiệu Trị sent Mai Công Ngôn as the commander to bring Huế forces to defend Danang. Thiệu Trị also sent five Vietnamese copper-plated warships to guard Danang. Both sides claimed that the other side initiated the attack. According to the Vietnamese Đại Nam thực lục, the French began the attack as Lapierre led an amphibious assault on Danang, where Mai Công Ngôn resisted the French attack and the Vietnamese warships fired on the French frigates. French sources, however, stated that Vietnam began the attack as the Vietnamese warships fired on the French warships Gloire and Victorieuse, who retaliated by bombarding the Vietnamese port of Danang on 15 April 1847. Due to technological superiority of the French navy, the Vietnamese in Danang suffered damages and casualties. Forty Vietnamese soldiers died and another ninety were injured. A mid-ranking Vietnamese officer was also killed in battle. All of the five Vietnamese copper-plated warships were destroyed and sunk. The French also neutralized ten Vietnamese cannons at Danang.

After the bombardment of Danang, Lapierre did not push for further negotiations as the goal of this expedition seemed to be retaliatory. Lapierre did not even take Bishop Lefebvre, who had earlier been sent off by Vietnam to Singapore. Lapierre and his subordinate Rigault de Genouilly left Danang with both frigates Gloire and Victorieuse to return to Macau. The Vietnamese Emperor Thiệu Trị was shocked at the French destructive attack on Danang, becoming depressed and ill. Thiệu Trị punished virtually every Vietnamese commanders and officers of the battle. Any Vietnamese soldiers who were caught by the French and released back were executed. Families of the fallen Vietnamese soldiers performed sacrificial rituals for the spirits of the dead on the beach of Danang. Thiệu Trị expressed his contempt and frustration on the Westerners to his Chief Minister Trương Đăng Quế;

Westerners are inherently cunning. If we lift the ban [on Christianity], the British will hear about it and will also beg to lift the ban on opium. The Westerners are like wolves; we cannot satisfy them! How can we comply to everything according to their wishes? Moreover, Christianity is a heterodoxy. Its harmful effect will lead to wars and external conflicts. Opium is the drug that causes ruin and endangers people's lives. Both of these things [Opium and Christianity] are to be strictly forbidden in the country. I will issue edict, which will be recorded in the national history for future generations, to strictly prohibit them and to prevent any external threats.

French bombardment of Danang in April 1847 was the first military conflict between France and Vietnam that would eventually lead to French colonization of Vietnam. In May 1847, Thiệu Trị's delegate in Cambodia performed enthronement ceremony for Ang Duong as Cao Miên quốc vương (高棉國王) or King of Cambodia as a vassal of Vietnam. As the agreement had been reached, Nguyễn Tri Phương the Vietnamese commander withdrew Vietnamese forces from Cambodia, ending the Siamese–Vietnamese War.

Just after the bombardment of Danang, in July 1847, Augustin de Lapierre the commander of French navy in the China Seas brought the same two French frigates Gloire and Victorieuse, along with his colleague De Genouilly and six hundred French marines, to Korea during the reign of King Heonjong to demand the Korean reply of the letter Cécille had delivered to Korea a year earlier, perhaps intending to impose a gunboat diplomacy on Korea in the same manner that he had just done to Vietnam. However, due to the rocky nature of the Korean shoreline, both the Gloire and the Victorieuse hit the reef in a shallow water in August, ran aground and wrecked at Gogunsando Island on the coast of Gunsan in modern North Jeolla Province. Losing both the Gloire and the Victorieuse, Lapierre and the French marines were stranded on the Gogunsando Island for two months, with the Koreans on the shore giving them food, until they were rescued by three British frigates in September 1847.

Bishop Dominique Lefebvre, the Apostolic Vicar of Western Cochinchina, at Singapore, was offered by William John Butterworth the Governor of the Straits Settlements to board on a British ship to return to Vietnam. Bishop Lefebvre, out of French patriotism, refused the British help offer and sought his own way back to Vietnam. Lefebvre managed to sneak into Vietnam in July 1847, only three months after the bombardment of Danang. Bishop Lefebvre joined Father Miche at Lái Thiêu near Saigon, where Lefebvre would stay for a long time up to the French conquest of Cochinchina until his departure in 1864.

Seeing the French assault on Danang, the British tried to approach Vietnam. John Francis Davis the Governor of British Hong Kong visited Danang in October 1847, proposing a trade relation and presenting a diplomatic letter. Still traumatized after the last French visit, Mai Công Ngôn, who had been stationing in Danang, quickly notified Emperor Thiệu Trị, who sent Tôn Thất Thường, the former Vietnamese envoy to Paris in 1840, to negotiate with the British. Davis asked to personally present his letter to the Vietnamese Emperor at Huế, to which Tôn Thất Thường refused. After the unsuccessful ten-day negotiation, Davis was obliged to leave Danang empty-handed. Davis blamed the earlier French bombardment of Danang for his failure to obtain a relation with Vietnam. The Vietnamese Emperor Thiệu Trị died in November 1847, shortly after the departure of Davis. His son succeeded to the Vietnamese throne as the new emperor Tự Đức.

=== Montigny's establishment of French concession in Shanghai ===
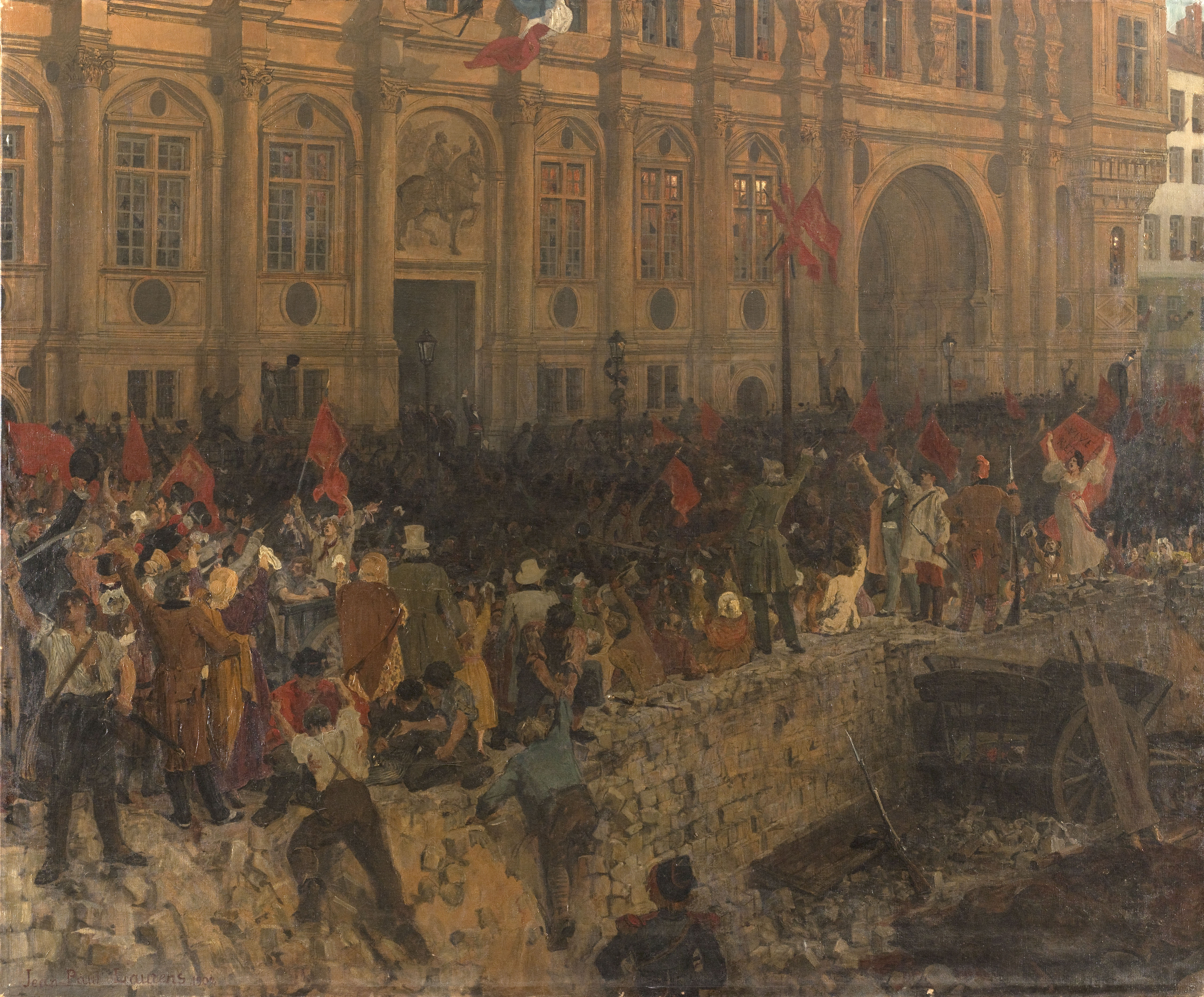
Proclamation of French Second Republic in the aftermath of February Revolution in February 1848, which overthrew the regime of July Monarchy under King Louis-Phillipe of the Orléans dynasty.

Charles de Montigny returned with the Lagrené Mission to France in 1846, where Montigny composed a report Manual for the French merchant in China (French: Manuel du négociant français en Chine), narrating what he had learned from joining the Lagrené Mission to China and what could be French commercial benefit potential in China and Vietnam. This report caught the attention of the French Foreign Minister François Guizot, who was impressed by Montigny's report. On 20 January 1847, Guizot appointed Montigny as the first-ever French Vice-Consul to Shanghai. By that time, France only had one diplomatic setting in Canton-Macau and Montigny's appointment to Shanghai was a new expansion, which Montigny had to start from scratch. Montigny and his family reached Macau in late 1847, where he did not bother to pay a visit to his superior Forth-Rouen the French Consul at Canton and proceeded directly to Shanghai, reaching Shanghai in February 1848. However, the February Revolution happened in February 1848, prompting King Louis-Phillippe, the Orléans royal family and the Prime Minister Guizot to flee to Britain, ending the July Monarchy regime. The remaining government then proclaimed French Second Republic under the Provisional Government.

Montigny and his family arrived in Shanghai in February 1848 with the French frigate Alcmène, which had earlier gone to Danang in 1845. In accordance with the Whampoa Treaty of 1844, China permitted the French to settle in the five ports including Shanghai. The British, however, arrived earlier and had established the British concession in Shanghai on the western bank of Huangpu River, north of Yangjingbang Canal, in 1845. George Balfour the British Consul at Shanghai invited Montigny for a tour in the British concession. Montigny saw that the British were well-established in Shanghai and the local Chinese officials treated the British with deference. With French patriotic sentiment, Montigny also wished that the French would be in similar position of honor as the British in Shanghai. However, Montigny saw that the French should not rely on the British and Montigny should build the French settlement in Shanghai with his own hands. Balfour invited Montigny to found the French concession within the British concession but Montigny refused. Montigny established himself in an old Chinese shack on the southern bank of the Yangjingbang Canal, where Montigny proudly hoisted the French flag. The Americans also established the American concession in Shanghai in 1848 at Hongkou on the northern bank of Huangpu River.

In March 1848, Chaophraya Bodindecha the Siamese commander in Cambodia enthroned Ang Duong as the King Harireak Reamea of Cambodia under Siamese auspices. Father Jean-Claude Miche, who had been with Bishop Lefebvre in Lái Thiêu, was invited by Ang Duong to Cambodia in 1848. Upon his arrival in Cambodia, Father Miche was asked by the Cambodian king Ang Duong to write a letter to the French government to allow French merchants to come to trade in Cambodia. Ang Duong also expressed his wishes to send Khmer people for education in France. Queen Mother Vara Neak Neang Ros, mother of Ang Duong, expressed her opinion that French presence would deter Vietnamese intervention in Cambodia. Bodindecha the Siamese commander was delighted upon knowing that the French had bombarded Danang and even proposed to march his Laotian troops to help France attack Vietnam. Father Miche turned down all these proposals, saying that he wanted Cambodia to be a safe haven for Christians, not going into wars. Chaophraya Bodindecha led the Siamese armies to leave Cambodia in April 1848. Cambodia then became free from both Siamese and Vietnamese military presence. Father Miche took his residence in the Catholic community at Ponhea Lueu.

Map of foreign concessions in Shanghai; the British concession is labeled in blue, the American concession was to the north of British concession and the French concession was to the south of the British concession and north of the Chinese city.

Montigny initiated his project to establish the French concession in Shanghai without consulting his superior Forth-Rouen at Macau. French merchants, however, did not come to trade in Shanghai much due to the economic downturn after the February Revolution. Without the presence of French merchants, Montigny could not justify his establishment of the concession. When one single French merchant named Dominique Rémi came to reside with him, Montigny proposed to Lin Gui the Daotai (道臺) or the Chinese governor of Shanghai to grant the land south of Yangjingbang canal for Montigny to establish the French concession. Lin Gui, however, rejected this proposal by telling Montigny to consult George Balfour the British Consul in Shanghai, whom Lin Gui considered to exercise jurisdiction over foreign concessions in Shanghai. This enraged Montigny, who threatened that Lin Gui's refusal to grant concession to France violated the Article 22 of the Whampoa Treaty and Montigny would bring this matter to the imperial court of Beijing. Lin Gui eventually cowered, granting the land for French concession in March 1849.

In June 1849, the cholera outbreak reached Bangkok, killing ten thousands of the inhabitants, including Chaophraya Bodindecha the former Siamese general in Cambodia. In his efforts to make Buddhist merits to placate the epidemic, King Rama III of Siam ordered the general merit-making by using his money to buy domesticated animals that were going to be killed for food to release them, saving the animals' lives. The king also encouraged the Siamese populace to do the same by releasing the domesticated animals. The French missionaries, however, saw this practice of releasing animals to make Buddhist merits as superstition and discouraged the Catholics from following the king's order. Dissatisfied, the king ordered the expulsion of all French missionaries from Siam and all Catholic churches be destroyed.

Among the nine French priests in Bangkok, only Bishop Pallegoix the Apostolic Vicar of Eastern Siam compromised with the king by assigning Phra Wisetsongkhram Pascoal Ribeiro de Albergaria, a Siamese Catholic official of Cambodian–Portuguese Mestizo descent, younger brother of the previous Phra Wisetsongkhram Bento Ribeiro, to collect domesticated animals from the Catholic churches for the king to release. The king thus became satisfied and rescinded his order to destroy the churches. However, the eight other French missionaries chose to leave Siam rather than to comply with the king's order. These French priests were Pierre Clémenceau, Jean-Baptiste Grandjean, Jean Claudet, Aimé Dupond, Séverin Daniel, Louis Larnaudie, Nicolas Lequeux and Pierre Gibarta, who left Siam for Singapore, Penang and Hong Kong.

The cholera epidemic then spread from Siam to Cambodia and Southern Vietnam, reaching Northern Vietnam by 1850. Ten thousands of Cambodian, Siamese and Vietnamese people died from the disease. In August 1850, Pope Pius IX issued papal brief Quoties benedicente creating the Apostolic vicariate of Cambodia, separating from the Western Cochinchina vicariate, with Jean-Claude Miche the Bishop of Dansara at Ponhea Lueu appointed as the first Apostolic Vicar of Cambodia.

== Prelude to the Montigny Mission ==
=== Cambodia's approach to Britain ===
After the fifteen years of Siamese–Vietnamese warfare over Cambodia, both Siam and Vietnam reached an agreement that allow Ang Duong to be enthroned as King Harireak Reamea of Cambodia during 1847–1848 with endorsements of both Siam and Vietnam. Siam and Vietnam then withdrew their troops from Cambodia. With ascension of Ang Duong and departures of the Siamese and the Vietnamese, Cambodia was finally at peace. Nevertheless, decades of warfare left Cambodia in ruinous state with poor economy. Ang Duong, given his own experience, speculated that such Siamese–Vietnamese contention over Cambodia would happen again in the future; "The Thai would take over the north and north-western part of Cambodia, including Pursat, Kampong Svay, Oudong, Sambaur, Kratié, Thbang Khmum, while the Vietnamese would occupy the rest of the country in the south, the regions of Baphnom, Treang and Phnom Penh." Bothered by this persisting idea of possible resumption of this calamity and seeing that the Cambodians themselves would not be able to defend against both adversaries, Ang Duong's solution was to seek assistant from powerful distant powers.

In 1849, King Harireak Reamea Ang Duong sent his delegate Constantine Monteiro, a Cambodian–Portuguese Mestizo official, to bring gifts to William John Butterworth the Governor of the Straits Settlements, asking for British protection against the Chinese pirates in the Gulf of Siam. Monteiro arrived in Singapore in mid-1850, where his presence was reported by the newspaper Singapore Free Press in August 1850. Sir James Brooke, who was in Singapore on his way as the delegate to Siam, suggested to Lord Palmerston the British Foreign Secretary in July 1850 that Britain might utilize Cambodia as leverage in negotiations with Siam and Vietnam; "Cambodia is the Keystone of our policy in these countries, –the King of that ancient Kingdom is ready to throw himself under protection of any European nation, who will save him from his implacable enemies, the Siamese and the Cochin Chinese."

Sir James Brooke the British delegate arrived in Bangkok in August 1850 to propose a new treaty with Siam, demanding abolition of the so-called measurement duties and establishment of British consulate in Siam. The Siamese court during the last years of King Rama III or King Nangklao was fairly anti-Western, rejecting any proposals of Brooke for reasons that the Siamese king was ill and Chaophraya Phrakhlang Dit Bunnag the Siamese trade minister saw no obligations to conclude a new treaty as the existing Anglo–Siamese Burney Treaty of 1826 was adequate. Disgruntled, James Brooke threatened the Siamese court with gunboat diplomacy. Anglo–Siamese relations became tense and rumors spread about possible imminent British attack on Siam.

John Crawfurd, a retired employee of British East India Company and former envoy to Siam in 1822, reported to Edward Smith-Stanley the Earl of Derby in December 1850 that "The King of Cambodia is now hemmed in between two rival and powerful Potentates," and "The King of Cambodia would gladly and gratefully place himself under protection of any European power what would guarantee him protection against the Siamese and Cochin Chinese." Frédéric Gauthier the French Consul in Singapore reported that, due to Siamese resistance against Sir James Brooke's mission in 1850, Britain was seriously considering using Cambodia as base instead. In spite of speculations and rumors, William Butterworth the Governor of Straits Settlement himself was totally not interested in establishing relations with Cambodia as he did not even meet Monteiro. Butterworth, in his report to Palmerston in 1851, dismissed the rumor of Cambodia asking for British protection, saying that the matter only concerned the Chinese pirates.

British merchants in Singapore, however, saw Cambodia as a commercial potential. The firm D'Almeida commissioned the Danish explorer Ludvig Verner Helms, with his sloop Pantaloon, to go to Cambodia. Ludvig Verner Helms brought the Cambodian delegate Constantine Monteiro from Singapore to Cambodia, leaving Singapore in February 1851 and arriving in Kampot, a Cambodian port in Southwestern Cambodia. Siam was informed about Helms' arrival in Kampot. Helms and Monteiro traveled from Kampot to Oudong in an oxen cart on the road previously built under the commission of Ang Duong, which Helms described as lacking in water supply, going through forests and wild animals.

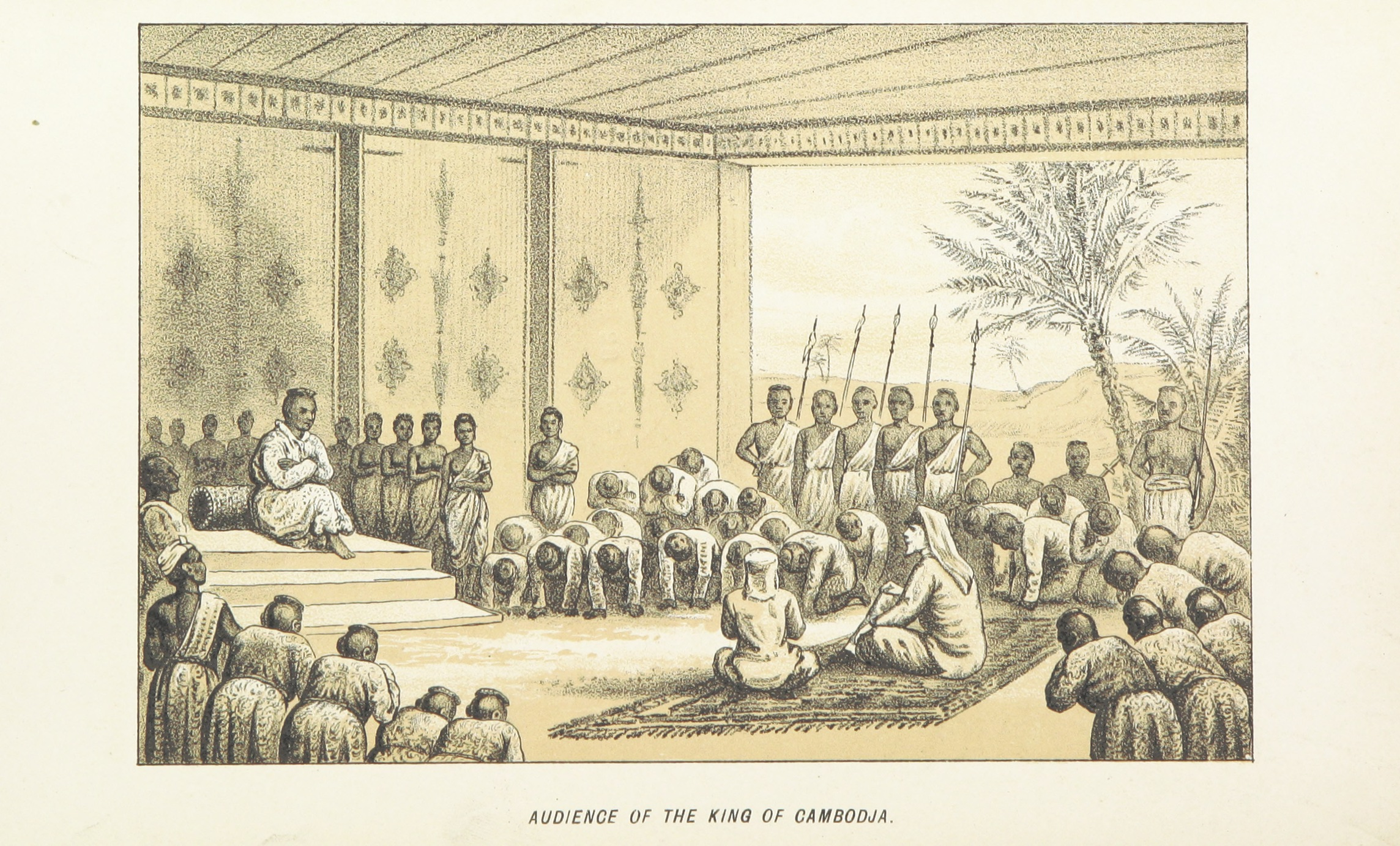
Depiction of Ludwig Verner Helms, a Danish explorer under British commission from Singapore, having audience with King Ang Duong of Cambodia in March 1851 at Oudong the royal Cambodian capital.

After ten days of journey, Ludwig Verner Helms reached Oudong the royal capital of Cambodia. Helms observed that Oudong consisted only of thatched huts because the town had been so often burnt down by the Siamese or the Vietnamese that it was not worthy to construct any permanent houses and the jackle howled all night. Helms also described Ang Duong's palace as consisting of two layers of wooden walls. In Helms' audience with Ang Duong in March 1851, Ang Duong himself narrated the History of Cambodia from the Vietnamese execution of Princess Ang Baen, Vietnamese installation of Ang Mey as puppet ruler to his own ascension to the Cambodian throne. Helms also met Jean-Claude Miche the Apostolic Vicar of Cambodia, who recounted the Vietnamese persecutions of Christians, of which Miche himself barely survived, to Helms. Helms stayed in Oudong for a week and upon Helms' departure King Ang Duong granted him an elephant for him to ride to return to Kampot. From Kampot, with his ship Pantaloon, Helms returned to Singapore in June 1851. Despite these ventures, the Cambodian attempt to establish relation with Britain did not materialize and faded away.

=== Vietnamese executions of French priests Schoeffler and Bonnard ===
During the reign of Vietnamese Emperor Thiệu Trị, Catholic missionaries were caught and imprisoned but never executed. Nevertheless, French warships visited the Vietnamese gateway port of Danang (also called Tourane) three times in 1843, 1845 and 1847 to intervene on behalf of the missionaries, of which the last occasion in 1847 the encounter turned violent as the French frigates bombarded Danang, inflicting damages and casualties on Vietnam. Thiệu Trị saw that his eldest son Prince Nguyễn Phúc Hồng Bảo was incompetent and saw his second son Prince Nguyễn Phúc Hồng Nhậm, who had been studious in Confucian teachings, in better light and more suited for the throne. Trương Đăng Quế, Thiệu Trị's Chief Minister, also politically supported Prince Hồng Nhậm to the throne. Upon Thiệu Trị's death in November 1847, the Emperor allegedly gave his final instruction to Trương Đăng Quế to install Hồng Nhậm on the throne, who reigned as Emperor Tự Đức, instead of Hồng Bảo. There are two competing historiographies; one favors Hồng Bảo, saying that Trương Đăng Quế had forged the imperial will and another favors Tự Đức, saying that the will was genuine and Hồng Bảo was truly incompetent.

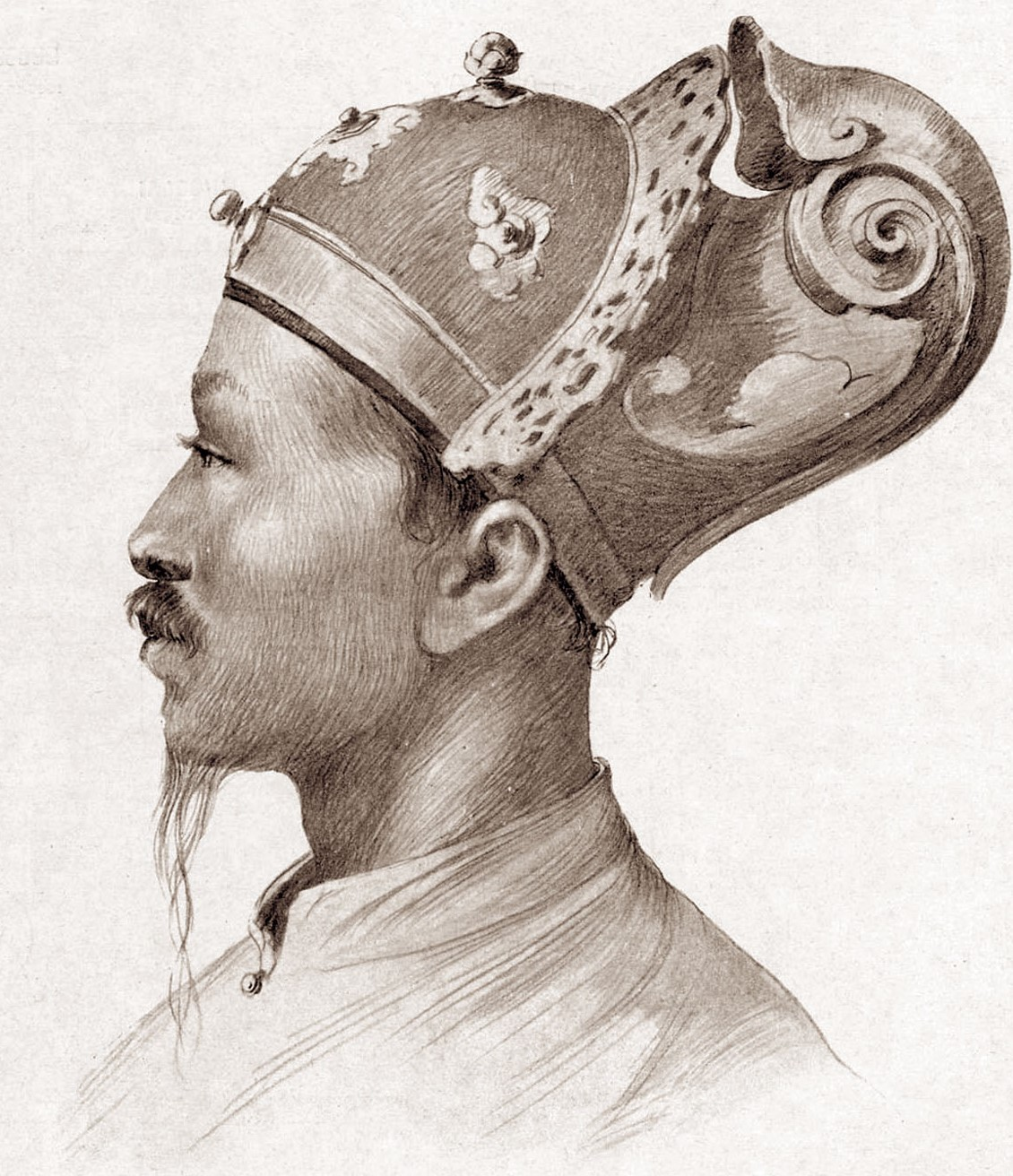
Tự Đức, who ascended as Emperor of Vietnam in 1847, was staunchly anti-Christian and anti-Western. His executions of French priests Schoeffler and Bonnard led to aggressive French intervention.

Regardless of historiographies, the new emperor Tự Đức was very anti-Western and anti-Christian, returning to the intensive persecutions of the reign of his grandfather Minh Mạng in the 1830s. Tự Đức prescribed an edict in 1848 calling for the death of all Western missionaries in Vietnam, banishment of all Vietnamese Christians and another edict in 1851 inflicting death penalties on native Vietnamese Christian clergy. As Tự Đức adopted a staunch anti-Western view, his older brother Prince Hồng Bảo saw opportunities in allying with the French missionaries, promising that if he were to ascend the throne, Hồng Bảo would grant freedom to Christians or even convert to Christianity himself. French missionaries in Vietnam, such as Pierre-André Retord the Apostolic of Western Tonkin and François Pellerin in Central Vietnam, were cautious about expressing explicit support to Hồng Bảo. However, the French missionaries wrote to the French government of the Second Republic in 1848, urging France to intervene on behalf of Hồng Bảo in the same manner to French assistance to Nguyễn Phúc Ánh in the 1780s to secure a Christian king in Vietnam. However, France was then under the Provisional Government and the general election was being held so France was not interested in the affair of Vietnam this time.

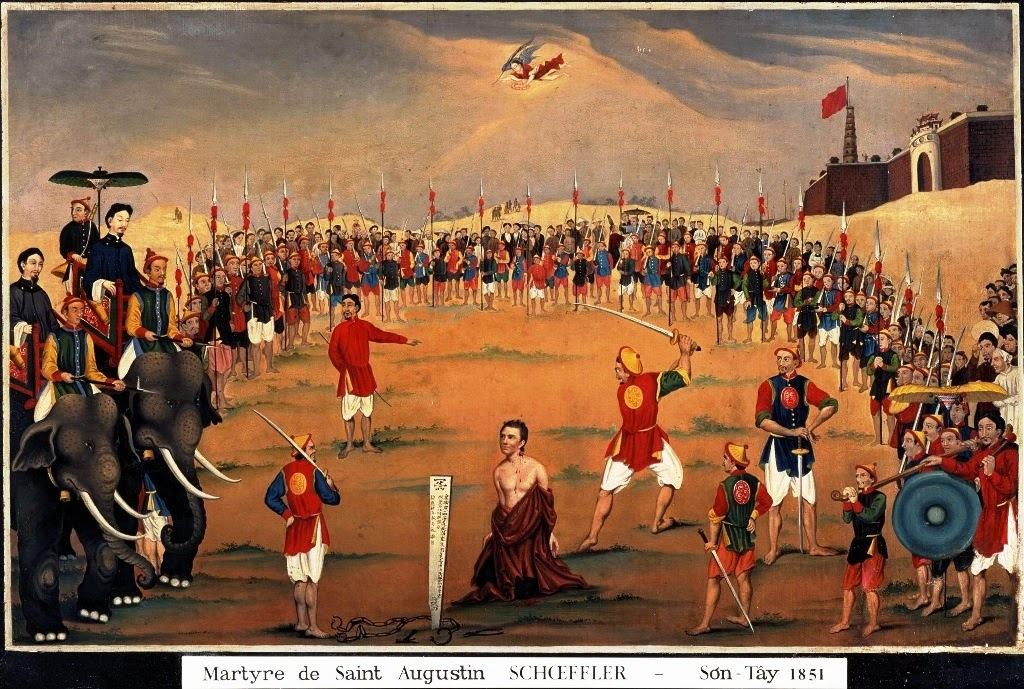
Execution of the French-German priest Augustin Schoeffler at Sơn Tây in May 1851

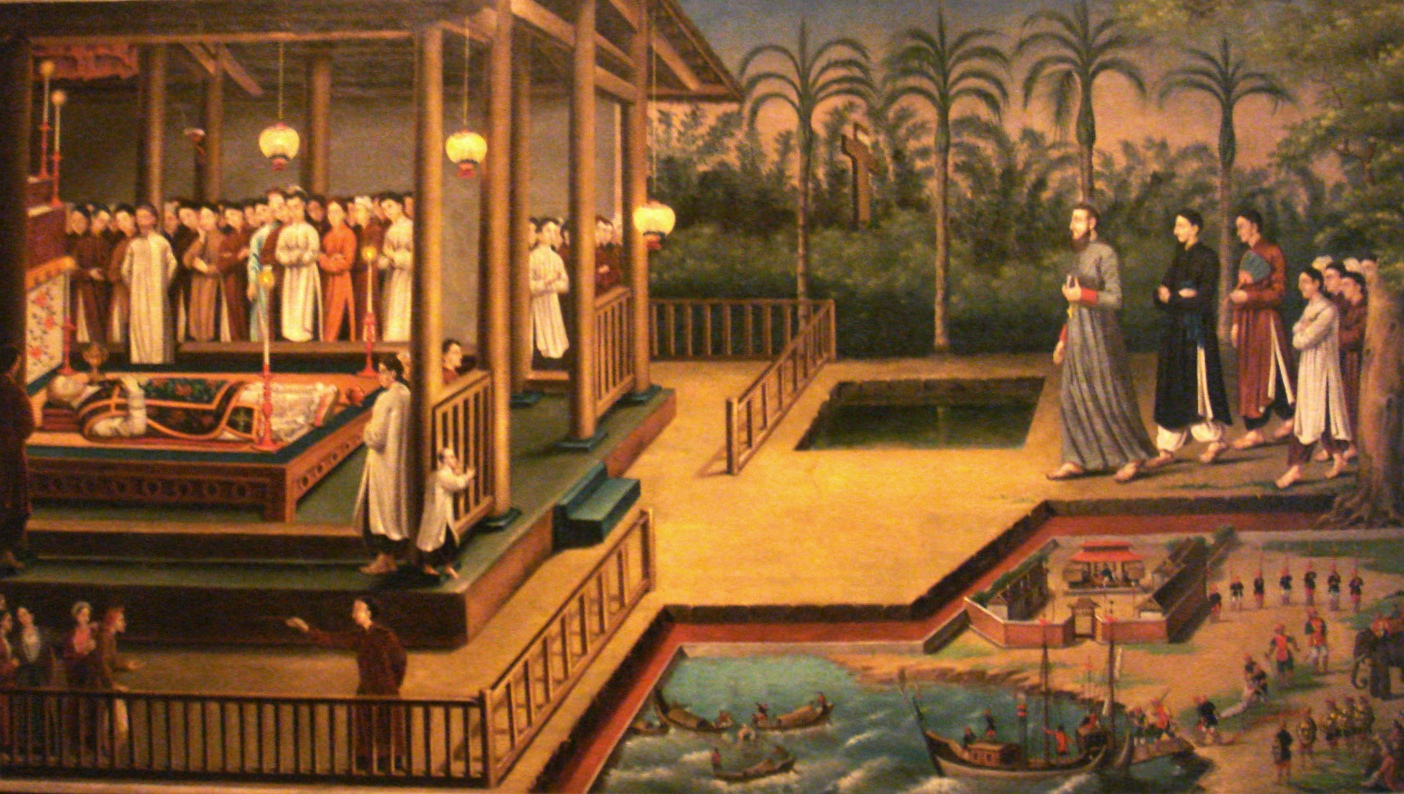
Funeral of the French priest Jean-Louis Bonnard, who was executed in May 1852, during which Bishop Retord the Apostolic Vicar of Western Tonkin came to attend.

In January 1851, Prince Hồng Bảo attempted to flee from Huế, boarding on a British ship to Singapore but was caught. Hồng Bảo was obliged to dress in white robes and kneel in front of the imperial palace, asking for forgiveness. Tự Đức did forgive his older brother but became suspicious of the Christian involvement. Tự Đức conducted another Christian persecution in March 1851, during which Augustin Schoeffler, a German Catholic priest from Nancy working under the French MEP order, was arrested in Sơn Tây in Northern Vietnam and was executed by beheading at the age of twenty-nine in May 1851.

"Prince-President" Louis-Napoléon Bonaparte appointed Alphonse de Bourboulon as the new French Minister in China. Alphonse de Bourboulon arrived in Macau in October 1851. Jean-Louis Bonnard, a French missionary in Nam Định in Northern Vietnam, was executed in May 1852. Father Libois the procurator of Paris Foreign Missions Society in Macau informed Bourboulon about Vietnamese executions of the two French priests. Also in 1852, Louis-Napoléon Bonaparte declared himself Emperor of the French, founding the French Second Empire. Bourboulon the French Minister in China was furious at Vietnamese executions of the French missionaries Schoeffler and Bonnard and wrote a letter to the new French Foreign Minister Édouard Drouyn de Lhuys in August 1852 with fiery and passionate tone;

One year apart, to the day, in the same country, probably in the same place, two French missionaries were subjected to a cruel death by order of the [Vietnamese] sovereign authority, publicly and legally slaughtered without being accused of any other crime than preaching a religion of peace or submission to temporal authority. I know they do it at their own risk and peril, that France has not committed itself to protect them in their adventurous career, they do not even ask for it, but they are nonetheless French. And from the point of view of humanity, France, in fact, bears the responsibility for these attacks committed against her subjects. Will she be then content to record and deplore, year by year, these abominable executions of men who belong to her, at least in the eyes of the world? Will she allow the continuation of these human sacrifices that are repeated in Cochinchina with audacious and atrocious regularity? Yet, what prevents her from putting an end to these horrors? She is at peace with all civilized nations, who would unanimously applaud an act of strength beneficial to all humanity. She has a powerful navy that costs her almost as much when idle as when active, or she sends her agents to represent her in these distant lands only to witness the outrage she receives? Does she send warships there only to conduct hydrographic surveys and to demonstrate, by their useless presence, her inability to avenge insults on her, to avenge the French blood shed by wretched and insolent barbarians?

Bourboulon proposed to Drouyn de Lhuys to enforce the Article 23 of the Sino–French Whampoa Treaty on the vassals of China, namely Korea and Vietnam, or else if France allowed both Korea and Vietnam to persecute the missionaries, China would soon follow suit. Vietnamese executions of two French MEP priests Schoeffler and Bonnard, in 1851 and 1852, toughened French policy on Vietnam itself. A month later, in September 1852, Bourboulon proposed that France should send a plenipotentiary to Vietnam with a warship to procure religious tolerance, a commercial treaty, also to force Vietnam to cede the port of Tourane (Danang) to France, according to the terms stipulated in the 1787 Treaty of Versailles, as a compensation for Vietnamese persecutions of French missionaries all those past years.

=== Ascension of King Mongkut ===
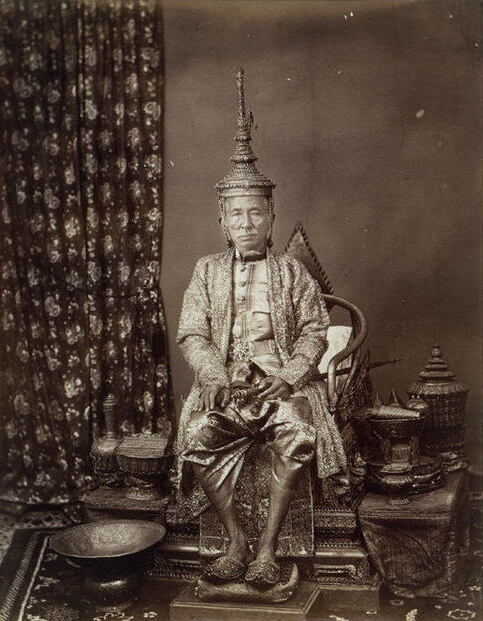
King Mongkut of Siam ascended the throne in April 1851 with support of the Bunnag family. Mongkut appointed the Bunnags to highest ministerial positions. His ascension marked the shift of Siam's policy to be Western-sympathetic.

In March 1851, shortly before the demise of the Siamese king Rama III or King Nangklao, Chaophraya Phrakhlang Dit Bunnag the Siamsese Minister of Trade and Foreign Affairs sent his two sons Chameun Waiworanat Chuang Bunnag and Chameun Rachamat Kham Bunnag to invite Prince Mongkut, who had been a Theravadin Buddhist monk for twenty-seven years since 1824, staying at Wat Bowonniwet Temple, to take the throne. Prince Mongkut replied that, if he was to take the throne, his younger brother Prince Chutamani (also called Prince Itsaret Rangsan, who led the Siamese navy to attack Hà Tiên in 1842) should also take the throne to rule jointly as the co-equal Second King. King Nangklao died in April 1851 and was succeeded by Mongkut as the new king of Siam. Itsaret Rangsan, Mongkut's younger brother, was also made the Second King of Siam as the Vice-king Pinklao, taking the residence at the Front Palace. As Mongkut ascended the throne with the support of Bunnag family, he appointed the Bunnags to high ministerial positions;

- Chaophraya Phrakhlang Dit Bunnag was appointed Somdet Chaophraya Prayurawong, known colloquially as Somdet Chaophraya Ong Yai or the Elder Somdet.
- Chaophraya Siphiphat That Bunnag, younger brother of Dit Bunnag, was appointed Somdet Chaophraya Phichaiyat, known colloquially as Somdet Chaophraya Ong Noi or the Younger Somdet.
- Chameun Waiworanat Chuang Bunnag, eldest son of Dit Bunnag, was appointed as Chaophraya Si Suriyawong the Samuha Kalahom or Prime Minister of Southern Siam.
- Chameun Rachamat Kham Bunnag, other son of Dit Bunnag, was appointed the Phrakhlang or Minister of Trade and Foreign Affairs with title Chaophraya Rawiwong.

Ascension of Mongkut as the new King of Siam in 1851 marked the shift from the relatively conservative attitudes of the Siamese government during the last years of King Nangklao to an open, pro-Western policy of the new reign. Mongkut had the American Baptist missionary John Taylor Jones publish an article on the British newspaper Singapore Free Press, announcing the new reign;

- The new Siamese king intended to promote diplomatic and commercial relations with Western countries; "In regard to the intercourse with foreign nations, many of the reforms said to be contemplated having been embraced in the papers which he submitted to the Siamese Government. The new monarch is a man of liberal sentiments,"
- The new Siamese king deplored Sir James Brooke, who had earlier attempted to negotiate a new treaty with Siam in 1850, to return to Siam to resume his negotiations; "The views of Sir James Brooke in regard to Siamese affair were appreciated an acquiesced in by the present King and his Ministers is best testified by the very general wish which is stated to prevail at the Siamese Court that Sir James should renew his visit to Bangkok at as early a period as possible."
- The new Siamese king invited the French missionaries, who had earlier left Siam during the animal-releasing incident of 1849, to return to Siam; "His Majesty has given permission to the French Missionaries, who were obliged to leave Siam some time ago, to return, so that toleration in matters of religion would also seem to be one of his virtues."

Upon knowing that the new king of Siam had a more-sympathetic sentiment towards Westerners than his predecessor, the British firms in Singapore commissioned Ludwig Verner Helms, the Danish explorer who had earlier visited Cambodia, for a survey to Siam to ascertain the rumor that Siam had a new king who was well-inclined towards Westerners. Ludwig Verner Helms left Singapore in June 1851, arriving at Paknam Samut Prakarn at the mouth of Chaophraya River in July. Phraya Samut Buranurak the governor of Samut Prakarn told Helms that the Siamese government had been aware of Helms' earlier visit to Cambodia. Helms them proceeded from Paknam to Bangkok, where he has an audience with King Mongkut in the Siamese royal palace in July 1851. Helms informed the Siamese king that his purpose of visit was to confirm the rumor about Siam having a new pro-Western king. Mongkut replied that he knew about Helms' venture in Cambodia four months earlier. Mongkut also told Helms that it was truly his intention to conclude commercial treaties with Western nations to promote trade and production. Also in July, Helms attended a funerary cremation rite of a Siamese prince and a princess, during which he sat with the Cambodian prince Ang Reachea Voddey (future King Norodom), the eldest son of King Ang Duong of Cambodia, who had been a political hostage in Bangkok. Helms recounted his visit to Cambodia and his audience with Ang Duong for Reachea Voddey to hear.

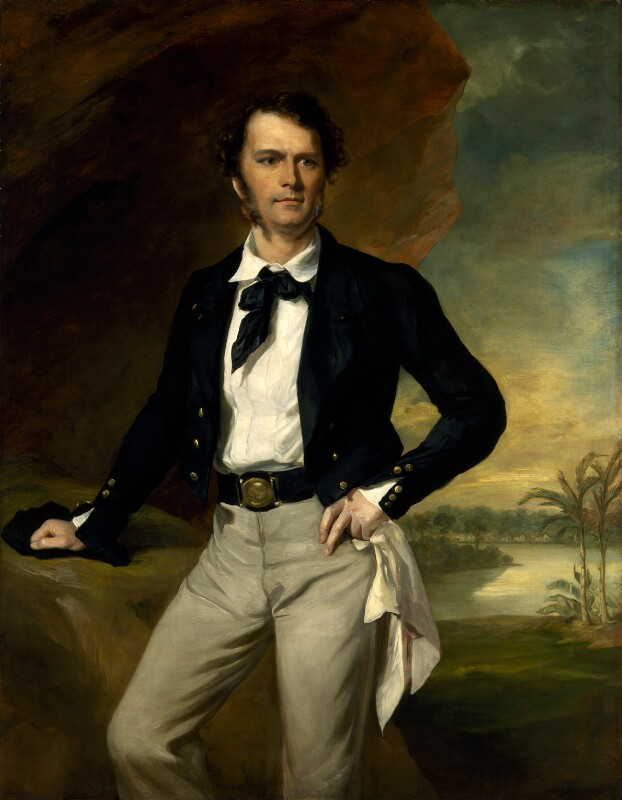
Sir James Brooke the Governor of Labuan and Rajah of Sarawak led the unsuccessful British mission to conclude treaty with Siam in 1850 and failed to return when Siam became receptive as his role passed to Sir John Bowring.

Mongkut had a strong desire to conclude a new treaty with Britain, assigning Phraya Si Suriyawong Chuang Bunnag to write some letters to Sir James Brooke at London. Lord Palmerston the British Foreign Secretary and Sir James Brooke, upon knowing of the ascension of the new positive-attitude Siamese king, arranged for Brooke to return to Siam. However, in mid-1851, King Mongkut wrote a letter to William Butterworth the Governor of Straits Settlements to postpone Brooke's visit to Siam because the Siamese government was being preoccupied by the funeral of the late King Nangklao. Moreover, Brooke faced legal charges in Britain about his suppression of the natives of Borneo during his time as the Governor of Labuan and the Rajah of Sarawak. Brooke was obliged to remain in Britain to defend himself legally. Brooke's new mission to Siam never came into being and the British diplomatic mission to Siam was postponed indefinitely.

In July 1851, French Second Republic appointed Rear Admiral Laguerre, the commander of French naval squadron at Réunion, as the French plenipotentiary to conclude a new treaty with Siam. Due to the regime change in France, Laguerre had to return to Paris to renew his credentials from the new emperor Napoleon III of France. Apart from Britain, Mongkut also intended to make a new treaty with France. Kham Bunnag the Phrakhlang assigned Bishop Jean-Baptiste Pallegoix the Apostolic Vicar of Eastern Siam to write a letter to the French Consul Gauthier at Singapore, requesting France to send a mission to Siam. Gauthier replied that France had already assigned the Rear Admiral Laguerre as the French envoy to Siam but Gauthier did not specify when would Laguerre arrive. In February 1852, Bishop Pallegoix brought the seven French missionaries, who had earlier been expelled from Siam in 1849, to have an audience with King Mongkut. Likely in his mission for King Mongkut, Bishop Pallegoix left Siam in March 1852 to bring Mongkut's letters in English language to Emperor Napoleon III at Paris and Pope Pius IX at Rome.

Funeral of King Nangklao was finished in April 1852. In July 1852, in accordance with Siamese royal practice of asking for investiture from the Chinese imperial court, King Mongkut sent a mission to Beijing. The Siamese envoys reached British Hong Kong in August, where they were accommodated by John Bowring the British Consul in Canton and the acting Governor of Hong Kong. Mongkut then wrote an English letter to Bowring, inviting Britain to strengthen relations with Siam; "to avail yourself of any opportunity for cultivating and strengthening the bond of amity between the Siamese and the British people." This was the first contact between Bowring and the Siamese king. Mongkut also stressed that Siam should be treated with at least the same honor as Vietnam, which was the enemy of Siam; "they may be with us in like or similar manner with that have been or will be with Cochin China which is opposing to our country, so that our council might see that the fortune of Siam and Cochin China is tolerable or equal." In China, the Taiping Rebellion was in the initial stage. The Siamese envoys obtained the investiture seal from Emperor Xienfeng but the Siamese envoys were attacked by Chinese bandits on the return journey. The investiture seal was stolen and one of the Siamese envoys was killed. This Siamese tributary mission to China in 1852 was the last of its kind in history.

=== Cambodia's approach to France ===
In 1852, Frédéric Gauthier the French Consul in Singapore reported that the Cambodian king Ang Duong was sympathetic to France but French intervention in Cambodia should be taken with caution because both Siam and Vietnam were ready to defend their claims on Cambodia. As the British became silent in the prospect of establishing relations with Cambodia, Jean-Claude Miche the Apostolic Vicar of Cambodia, a French missionary, proposed King Ang Duong of Cambodia to procure relations with France. On behalf of Ang Duong, Bishop Miche wrote a letter in French language and assigned Constantine Monteiro, the same Cambodian–Portuguese Mestizo official who had earlier visited Singapore in 1850, to go to Singapore again to deliver Miche's letter to Gauthier at Singapore. Monteiro delivered the letter to Gauthier at Singapore in December 1852. Monteiro told Gauthier that "The [Cambodian] King is very unfortunate. Despite his best intentions to freely admit foreigners into his kingdom and to encourage European trade, he is prevented from doing so, on one side by the Siamese and on the other by the Cochinchinese."

Gauthier, however, was not receptive in this Cambodian diplomatic advance facilitated by the French bishop Miche. Gauthier wrote a reply letter with neutral tone. Gauthier stated that France welcomed all amicable nations but Gauthier himself was just a consul and had not been empowered to initiate any relations with any kingdoms but promised to relay Cambodia's goodwill gesture to the French government.

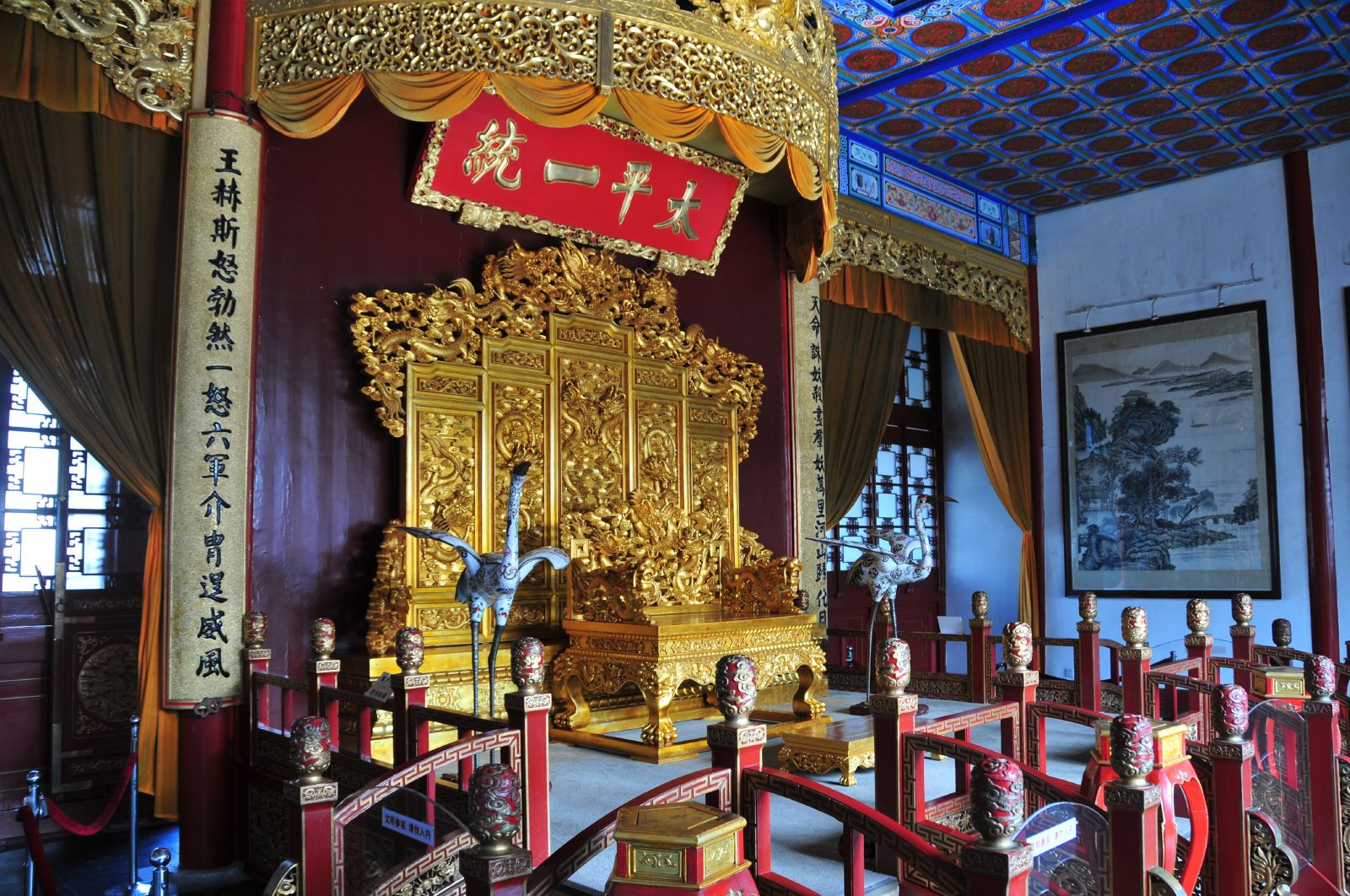
Throne of Hong Xiuquan the leader of the Taiping Rebellion, who proclaimed the Heavenly Kingdom of Taiping, at Nanjing, which he renamed as Tianjing or "Heavenly Capital".

In March 1853, the Taiping rebels seized Nanjing, putting Shanghai, which contained concessions of three Western nations, in danger. The British took neutral stance towards the rebellion, while the Americans were rather sympathetic to the rebels because the American missionaries considered the ideology of Taiping to be in alignment with Protestantism. The Catholic French, however, saw the rebels as absolute threats. Charles de Montigny the French Vice-Consul at Shanghai proposed to his superior Alphonse de Bourboulon the French Minister in Canton that France should intervene to help Qing imperial court suppress the Taiping rebels by sending French warships upstream the Yangtze River to attack the Taipings at Nanjing in order to gain China's favor. René de Courcy, an apprentice diplomat under Bourboulon, countered Montigny that France only had one warship in Shanghai. Then, Montigny became suddenly ill, coughing blood. Montigny then took a sick leave and left Shanghai with his family in June 1853 to return to France, leaving Benoît Edan as the acting French Vice-Consul in Shanghai.

King Harireak Reamea Ang Duong, upon seeing Gauthier's neutral response, asked Bishop Miche to write another French letter in June 1853. This time, Ang Duong assigned three Cambodian–Portuguese Mestizo officials to bring the letter along with the Cambodian products including ivory, rhinoceros' horn, gamboge, sugar and pepper, to present to Gauthier at Singapore, saying that his country was poor. This Cambodian diplomatic entourage reached Singapore around November 1853. In the letter, Ang Duong explained his own history of becoming the King of Cambodia with both the Siamese and the Vietnamese obstructing his way for European trade. Ang Duong also stated that "the Annamites have kept in their possession more than half of Cambodia," perhaps referring to the Kampuchea Krom of Mekong Delta previously ceded to Vietnam. Lastly, Ang Duong congratulated the ascension of Emperor Napoleon III, who was the chosen one of the first nation of the world and Ang Duong expressed his wishes to maintain friendly relations with France.

Upon receiving the Cambodian gifts, Gauthier the French Consul forwarded them, along with Ang Duong's letter translated by Bishop Miche, to France. During these engagements between Ang Duong and Gauthier, through Miche, it was not stated that Ang Duong explicitly asked for French protection against Siam and Vietnam. What can be implied is that Ang Duong attempted to establish a diplomatic relation with France through Gauthier. Later French diplomats and colonial academicians, however, interpreted this event as Cambodia requesting for French protection.

Meanwhile, the French informed the Siamese government of imminent arrival of Rear Admiral Laguerre the French plenipotentiary in early 1853. The ongoing Crimean War kept Laguerre busy. In November 1853, the French Foreign Minister Drouyn de Lhuys dispatched Laguerre to Siam. Laguerre arrived in Singapore in June 1854. However, Laguerre could not spare any French warships to enter Siam as a diplomat with full honors. Moreover, there were rumors about an incoming conservative coup in Siam to retake power from the liberal faction. There was a rumor that the oldest son of the Siamese Chief Minister (Chuang Bunnag, son of Dit Bunnag) would seize power to enthrone the Second King (Pinklao). Eventually, Laguerre was obliged to leave to bring French navy to assist the British admiral James Sterling in the China Seas to patrol against possible Russian presence in the waters. French diplomatic mission to Siam was then postponed indefinitely.

Gauthier the French Consul in Singapore sent the Cambodian gifts from Ang Duong on the corvette Capricieuse to France, reaching Toulon in Southern France in 1854. However, the French government had not yet taken the gifts, which would remain in Toulon for some years. According to Thai sources, as early as 1854, when arrival of Sir John Bowring in Siam became imminent, the Siamese king Mongkut discussed with the Cambodian king Ang Duong about the possibility of Cambodia signing treaties with Western powers in the same manner as Siam.

=== Bowring Mission to Siam ===
George Villiers the 4th Earl of Clarendon, the British Foreign Secretary, renewed the project of sending a British diplomatic mission to conclude a new treaty with Siam. On 10 January 1854, the Earl of Clarendon appointed John Bowring as Chief Superintendent of British Trade in China and the British plenipotentiary to conclude new treaties with three Asian nations including Japan, Siam and Vietnam. Bowring was knighted in February, becoming Sir John Bowring. In his instructions to Bowring, Clarendon prioritized Japan above all other kingdoms but Bowring saw that Japan had just been coerced by the Americans to sign the Convention of Kanagawa in March 1854 and Japan would be in no mood to negotiate with any other Western nations. Sir John Bowring saw Siam as an easy win as the Siamese king Mongkut had earlier expressed intention to Bowring in 1852 to maintain friendly relations with Britain. Bowring would acquire honor and reputation from the successful conclusion of this new treaty with Siam, which should be easily accomplished.

As the British had assigned Sir John Bowring to go to Siam, Drouyn de Lhuys the French Foreign Minister responded by having the French Emperor Napoleon III appoint Alphonse de Bourboulon the French Minister in China as the French Minister Plenipotentiary in China (French: Ministre plénipotentiaire en Chine) on 22 February 1854, empowering Bourboulon to conclude new treaties with Asian kingdoms including Siam.

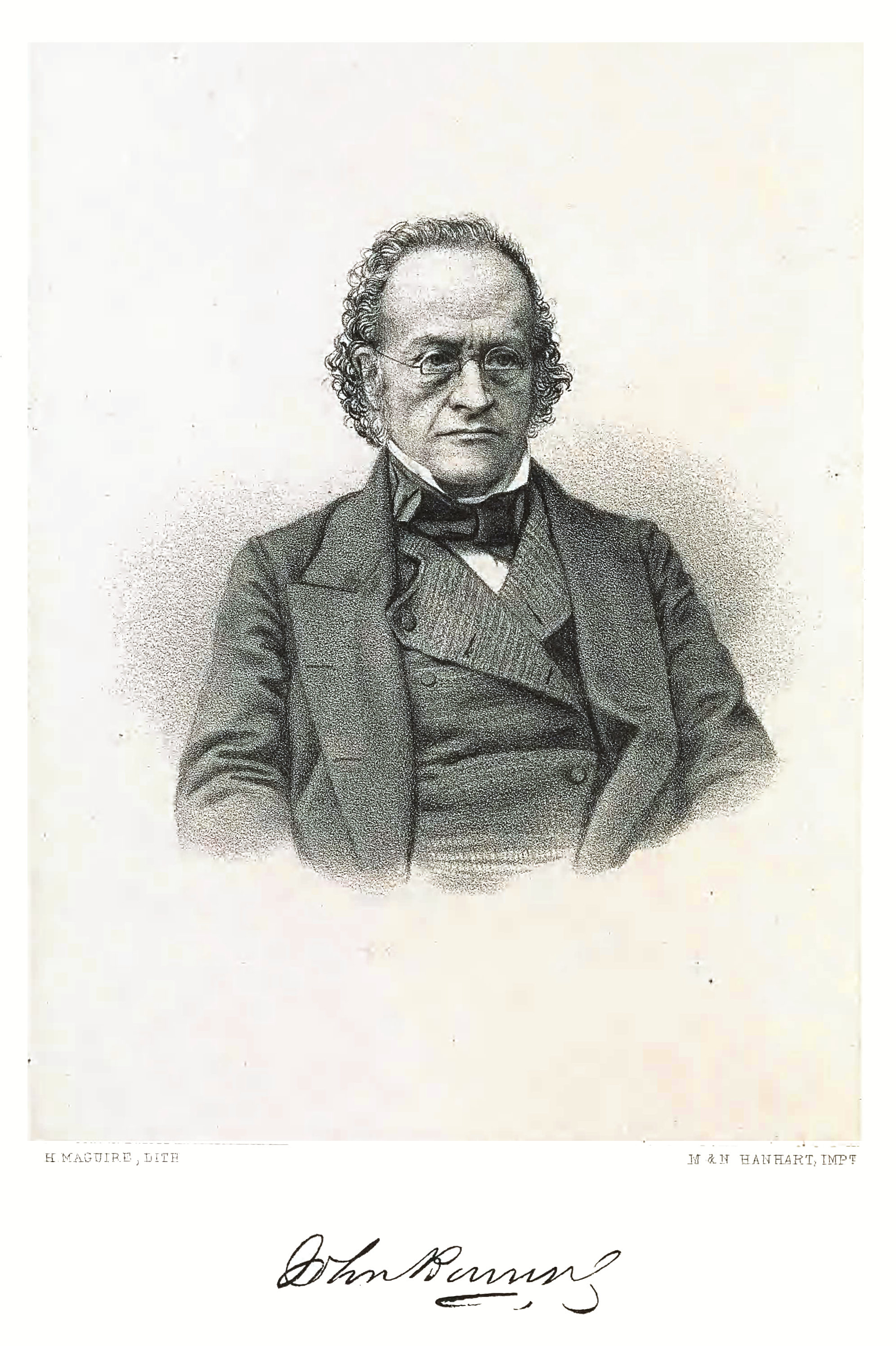
Sir John Bowring the Governor of Hong Kong was appointed as the British plenipotentiary in January 1854 on a mission to conclude the Anglo–Siamese Bowring Treaty of April 1855.

The Thai chronicles recorded Sir John Bowring the British plenipotentiary as the "First Envoy", Harry Parkes the British Consul at Amoy as the "Second Envoy" and Bowring's son John Charles Bowring as the "Third Envoy". The Bowring Mission entourage arrived at the river bar at the mouth of Chaophraya River on 24 March 1855 with two British ships the steam screw sloop HMS Rattler and the brig-sloop HMS Grecian. King Mongkut assigned Chaophraya Si Suriyawong Chuang Bunnag to bring a steamship from Bangkok to greet the British envoys at Samut Prakarn on April 2, where both sides shot 21-gun salute.

Chuang Bunnag, whom Bowring called Kalahom, dressed in British military costume, organized the Siamese military columns to greet the British envoys, who disembarked from the Rattler. Chuang Bunnag did not want the two British warships to go upstream to Bangkok for security reasons, citing the French bombardment of Danang in 1847 as the example. Bowring insisted that he came in peace and the ships were obliged to go to Bangkok as the part of Western diplomatic protocol. An agreement was reached that the sloop Rattler was only allowed to go up to the Pong Patchamit Fort (in modern Khlong San District, see Fortifications of Bangkok), which was about 2.5 kilometers downstream from the Wichaiprasit Fort or the Bangkok Fort and the Grecian would stay at the river bar during the whole mission. Moreover, Chuang Bunnag insisted that if Britain was to make a treaty with Siam, Britain should also make a similar treaty with Vietnam, or else Siam would lose prestige as the only Asian kingdom peacefully yielding to Western demands. Bowring assured the Siamese minister that he had already been assigned to conclude a treaty with Vietnam.

The three British envoys were carried by the Siamese riparian barges procession, reaching the Pong Patchamit Fort on 2 April 1855, followed by the sloop Rattler. The British envoys were accommodated at the "British factory", a Western-style mansion that had been receiving British envoys since 1822, in front of Wat Prayurawong Temple in modern Kanlaya, Thonburi District. According to Western protocol, the Rattler was to shot gun salute but the Bangkokian populace would be frightened by such explosive sounds. King Mongkut had to issue an announcement for the Bangkokians not to be panicked. King Mongkut received the British envoys Sir John Bowring, Harry Parkes and John Charles Bowring at Amarin Winitchai Throne Hall in the royal palace on 4 April 1855. The three British envoys were transported on sedan chairs carried on the shoulders of Siamese porters to enter the royal palace. In the royal audience, the three envoys sat on three chairs before the royal throne, while the Siamese princes, nobles and officials prostrated on the floor.

Bowring presented the gifts from Queen Victoria to King Mongkut, who asked whether Bowring was going to make a treaty with Vietnam. Bowring reassured the Siamese king that he was going to do so. Mongkut then spoke about a French missionary who had been his friend (Bishop Pallegoix) and stated that he would appoint four Siamese plenipotentiaries to negotiate the treaty with Bowring. Next day, on April 5, Sir John Bowring visited the French Catholic Mission in Bangkok. As Bishop Pallegoix had been away to France, Bishop Jean-Claude Miche the Apostolic Vicar of Cambodia had arrived in Bangkok to act in Pallegoix's stead. Bishop Miche led the nine French missionaries in Bangkok to greet Bowring and told Bowring that Cambodia had been sending tributes to Siam and Vietnam and feared both; "Monseigneur represents the Cambodians as paying tribute to both the Cochin Chinese and the Siamese, and equally afraid of both," and that violent persecutions of Christians were going on in Vietnam; "persecutions against the Catholics are actively carried on in Cochin China."

=== Anglo–Siamese Bowring Treaty (1855) ===
King Mongkut appointed four Siamese plenipotentiaries to negotiate and conclude the new treaty with Sir John Bowring;

- Somdet Chaophraya Prayurawong, personal name Dit Bunnag, called Somdet Chaophraya Ong Yai
- Somdet Chaophraya Phichaiyat, personal name That Bunnag, younger brother of Dit Bunnag, called Somdet Chaophraya Ong Noi
- Chaophraya Si Suriyawong, personal name Chuang Bunnag, eldest son of Dit Bunnag, whom Bowring called Kralahom
- Chaophraya Rawiwong, personal name Kham Bunnag, other son of Dit Bunnag, the Phrakhlang or Siamese Foreign Minister.

King Mongkut later added his younger half-brother Prince Kromma Luang Wongsathirat Sanit as the fifth plenipotentiary. Si Suriyawong Chuang Bunnag expressed his own opinion to Bowring that Siam's traditional system of tax farming was a burden on the populace and should be reformed but the senior nobles, most notably his own uncle That Bunnag, had been opposing the reforms because they were the beneficiaries of the old system. The negotiations began on 9 April 1855 at the mansion of Somdet Ong Yai near Bowring's residence, in which the five Siamese plenipotentiaries and the three British envoys Bowring, Parkes and John Charles attended. The British proposed establishment of consulate in Siam, land ownership of British subjects in Siam and reduction of import duties into a single three-percent levy. The Siamese replied that the British would be allowed to reside in Siam only in the area within twenty-four hour journey from Bangkok. Siamese delegates were divided on the matter of duties. That Bunnag the Somdet Ong Noi opposed the British proposal of reduction of traditional Siamese duties, while Chuang Bunnag supported the British proposal.

On April 10, the British plenipotentiaries went to discuss the matter of duties at the mansion of Somdet Ong Noi, who opposed these proposals. On the same day, Bowring visited Bishop Miche again. Bishop Miche told Bowring that both French Catholic and American Protestant missionaries barely made any conversions in Siam and gave Pallegoix's French-Thai-Latin dictionary to Bowring. In the evening of 10 April 1855, Bowring received a shocking news from Chuang Bunnag that his father and uncle, Dit and That Bunnag, the senior Somdets, were planning to overturn the negotiation by rejecting British proposals altogether. Chuang Bunnag "found it impossible to persuade the Commissioners and the influential nobles to accede to the conditions of the Treaty set forth by the Plenipotentiary." Enraged, Bowring declared that he would no longer attend any ceremonies and would take the Rattler to leave Siam immediately. Bowring's threat indeed made the senior Somdets cower to British demands.

Chuang Bunnag the Kralahom thanked Bowring that his threat was "well suited to the occasion." In the night of April 10, Prince Kromma Luang Wongsa held a meeting at his residence the Thonburi Palace. Somdet Ong Yai Dit Bunnag became suddenly ill and did not attend the meeting. Somdet Ong Noi That Bunnag and Kham Bunnag the Phrakhlang also called in sick. Bowring himself also did not attend but sent Harry Parkes and Bowring's son John Charles to the meeting. In the meeting at Thonburi Palace, only four people; Prince Wongsa, Chuang Bunnag, Harry Parkes and John Charles Bowring were present. These four people managed to settle all the terms by next day on April 11. On 16 April 1855, the Siamese plenipotentiaries brought the three British envoys to present the treaty to King Mongkut in a grand audience at the royal palace.

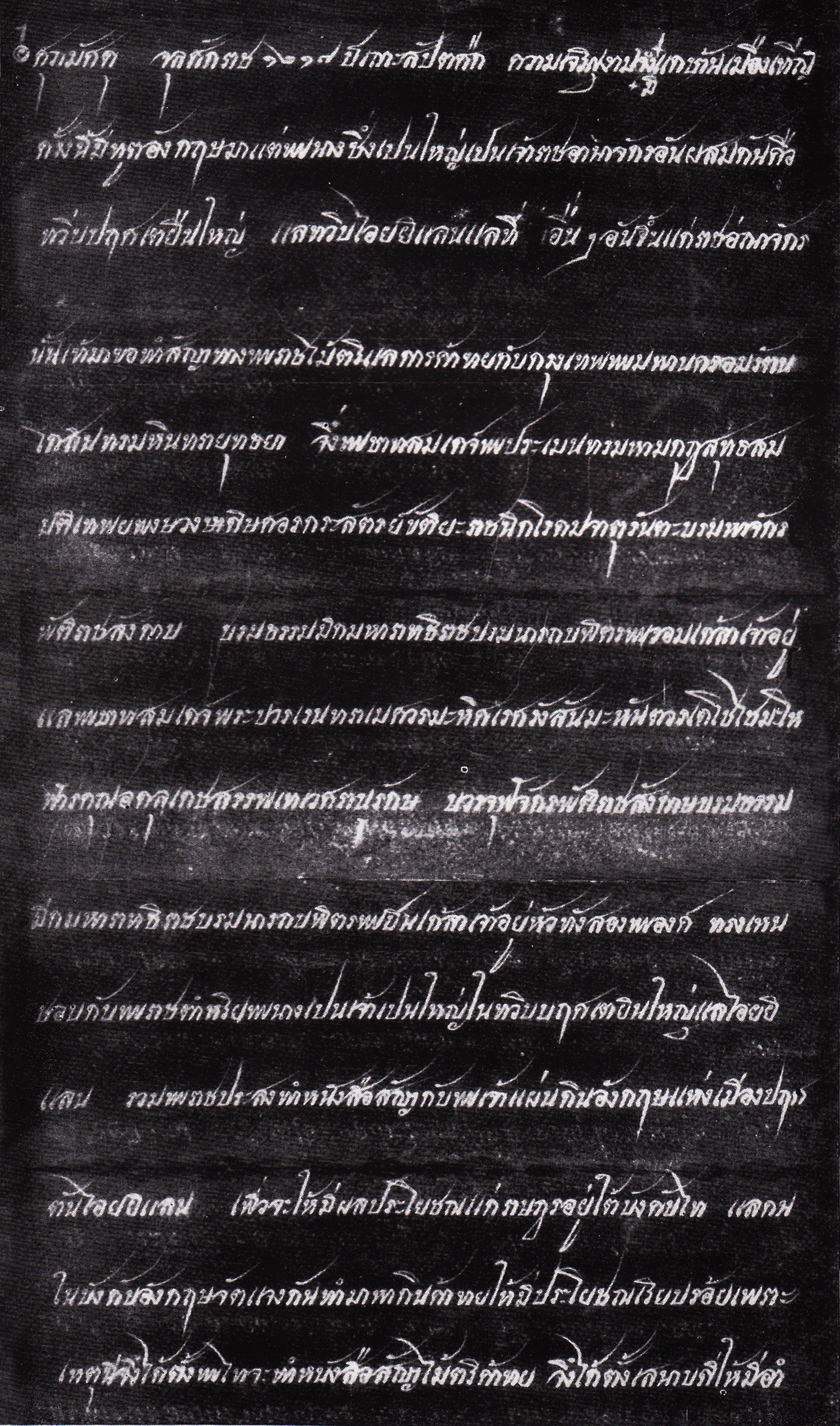
Anglo–Siamese Bowring Treaty of April 1855 began the new age of Siam's foreign relations in the era of Western imperialism, also serving as the model for subsequent unequal treaties that Siam was to conclude with other nations.

Treaty of Friendship and Commerce between Great Britain and Siam, known colloquially as the Bowring Treaty, was signed on 18 April 1855 at the mansion of Somdet Ong Yai, who had been ailing on his bed. The Siamese at Wichaiprasit Fort shot twenty-one salute cannon shots, to which HMS Rattler responded with similar 21-gun salute, celebrating the conclusion of the treaty. The terms of this Bowring Treaty included;

- Establishment of British consulate to oversee British subjects in Siam
- In legal cases that British nationals were defendants, the British Consul would judge the case with British law "in conjunction with" Siamese officials.
- Stipulation of the low three-percent general import duty
- Permission of land ownership and travel of British subjects in Siam only in the area four-mile farther from Bangkok but within the twenty-four journey from Bangkok

According to Bowring, Chuang Bunnag or Kralahom was instrumental in this successful conclusion of the treaty. Prince Wongsa also told Bowring that this treaty would be the model for all future treaties Siam was to conclude with other Western nations. On 24 April 1855, the three British envoys had a farewell audience with King Mongkut and left Bangkok for Paknam. The Bowring Mission left Siam at Paknam Samut Prakarn on April 25, with Bowring assigning Harry Parkes to bring the treaty to London for ratification, while Bowring himself returned to Hong Kong. Somdet Ong Yai Dit Bunnag died from his illness next day, on April 26, eight days after the signing of Bowring Treaty at his house.

After the successful conclusion of the treaty with Siam, Sir John Bowring eyed Vietnam as his next target. As the Vietnamese imperial court had been strongly anti-Western, Bowring had to carefully plan. Bowring speculated a tripartite British–French–American diplomatic mission to Vietnam but France and the United States were apparently not ready. As a survey, Bowring sent his own Chinese secretary Thomas Francis Wade boarding on HMS Rattler to bring his diplomatic letter to Vietnam. Thomas Wade on the Rattler arrived in Danang in September 1855. Wade gave Bowring's letter to the Vietnamese officials in Danang, who told Wade not to go to Huế. After waiting for some time, it became apparent that the Vietnamese court would not respond to Bowring's letter and Wade was obliged to leave empty-handed.

== Journey of Montigny to Southeast Asia ==
=== Catholic Church in Cambodia, Siam and Vietnam ===
By 1855, there were Catholic apostolic vicariates in Cambodia, Siam and Vietnam, with seven Apostolic Vicars in Vietnam, one in Siam and one in Cambodia, all of them were from Paris Foreign Missions Society (MEP), except for the Apostolic Vicars of Eastern and Central Tonkin, who belonged to the Spanish Dominican Order;

==== Northern Vietnam ====
- Apostolic vicariate of Western Tonkin, under Pierre-André Retord the Bishop of Acanthus, who had been hiding from Vietnamese authorities in Northern Vietnam since 1833. There were 117,870 Catholics under his jurisdiction.
- In 1846, Pope Gregory XVI separated the Apostolic vicariate of Southern Tonkin from Bishop Retord's Western Tonkin vicariate, appointing Jean-Denis Gauthier the Bishop of Emmaus as the first Apostolic Vicar of Southern Tonkin based near Vinh in Nghệ An Province. There were 66,350 Catholics under his jurisdiction.
- Apostolic vicariates of Eastern Tonkin and Central Tonkin were under Spanish Dominican Order:
  - Eastern Tonkin: Jerónimo Hermosilla the Bishop of Miletopolis as Apostolic Vicar, based in Hải Dương
  - Central Tonkin: José María Díaz the Bishop of Plataea as Apostolic Vicar, based near Nam Định

==== Central Vietnam ====
- Apostolic vicariate of Eastern Cochinchina, under Étienne Cuenot the Bishop of Metellopolis, based at Gò Thị near modern Quy Nhơn
- In 1850, Pope Pius IX separated the Apostolic vicariate of Northern Cochinchina from Bishop Cuenot's vicariate of Eastern Cochinchina, appointing François Pellerin the Bishop of Byblos as the first Apostolic Vicar of Northern Cochinchina based near Huế.

==== Southern Vietnam ====
- Apostolic vicariate of Western Cochinchina, under Dominique Lefebvre the Bishop of Isauropolis, based at Lái Thiêu near Saigon.

==== Siam ====
- Apostolic vicariate of Eastern Siam, under Jean-Baptiste Pallegoix the Bishop of Mallus, based at Assumption Church in Bangkok. There were 4,300 Catholics under his jurisdiction.

==== Cambodia ====
- Apostolic vicariate of Cambodia, under Jean-Claude Miche the Bishop of Dansara, based at Ponhea Lueu in Cambodia

=== Appointment of Montigny as Plenipotentiary to Siam ===
Harry Parkes brought the Bowring Treaty to London for ratification, reaching London in July 1855. Earl of Clarendon, the British Foreign Secretary, assigned Lord Cowley the British Ambassador in Paris to deliver a copy of the Bowring Treaty to Count Colonna-Walewski the French Foreign Minister on 9 August 1855, accompanied by a letter from Clarendon informing Walewski that the Siamese government had been asking about the French diplomatic mission to conclude a similar treaty with Siam but the British could not give a definitive answer because they did not know whether France really intended to send someone to Siam. Lord Cowley then told Walewski that Sir John Bowring regretted that he did not have a chance to conclude the Siamese treaty in concert with Alphonse de Bourboulon the French Minister in China. Lord Cowley also suggested to Walewski that France should send a diplomatic mission to conclude a new treaty with Siam as soon as possible.

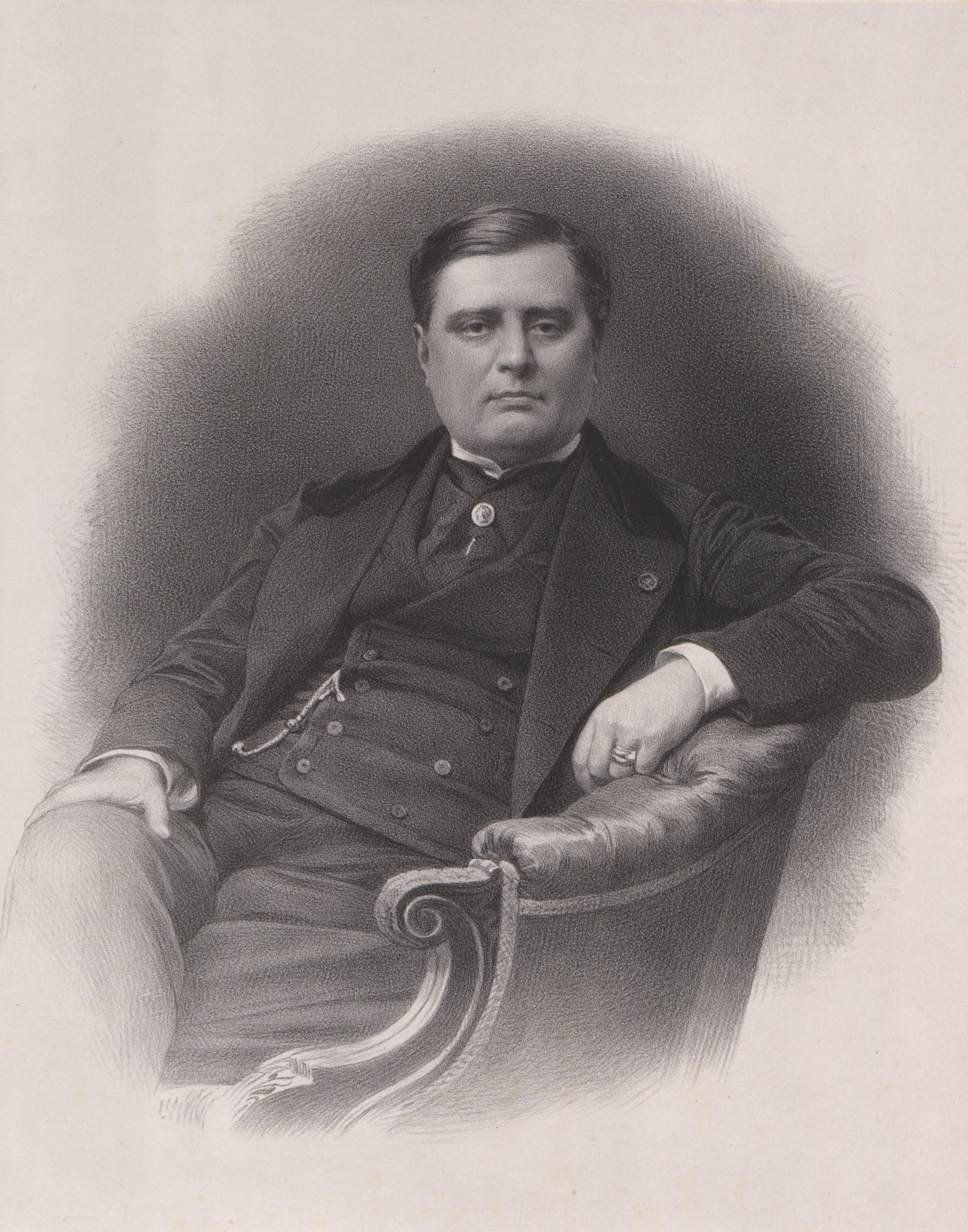
Count Colonna-Walewski, the French Foreign Minister, drafted the Franco–Siamese Treaty based on the preceding Anglo–Siamese Bowring Treaty of 1855 and assigned Charles de Montigny in November 1855 to bring the treaty draft to Siam.

Count Walewski then realized the urgency of sending a French diplomatic mission to Siam. Walewski asked Admiral Ferdinand-Alphonse Hamelin the French Minister of Marines to spare two or more French warships for Bourboulon to go Siam and those warships should not be inferior to the British ones. Walewski also found out that his predecessor Drouyn de Lhuys had appointed duplicate French envoys to Siam; Laguerre and Bourboulon. Walewski ruled that Bourboulon was the one true envoy to Siam, dismissing Laguerre. Walewski also retaliated by having Count Persigny the French Ambassador in London tell Clarendon that Walewski similarly regretted that France did not manage to conclude the Siamese treaty in concert with Britain.

In September 1855, President Franklin Pierce of the United States commissioned Townsend Harris, who had earlier been appointed the Consul General to Tokugawa Japan, to go as the American plenipotentiary to conclude a new treaty with Siam on his journey to Japan.

Unlike Britain, who had already gained a concrete foothold in the Far East, France essentially lacked experienced diplomatic personnel who were well-versed in Asian affairs. Alphonse de Bourboulon at Macau, the prospective French envoy to Siam, was unable to go to Siam as he was on his leave to France. Bourboulon had assigned his apprentice the young 27-year-old French diplomat René de Courcy to go to Siam in his stead. However, Charles de Montigny the French Vice-Consul of Shanghai, who had returned from Shanghai and arrived in France in early 1855, convinced Walewski to appoint him as the French envoy to Siam to replace Bourboulon. Montigny used to take part in the Lagrené Mission of 1843–1846 that resulted in the Treaty of Whampoa and establishment of French presence in the Far East. As a diplomat, Montigny retained much of military ardor and audacity of this youth as a French soldier with bravery, patriotic zeal and feverish activity. Montigny had disobeyed his superiors for than once. Nevertheless, Montigny had been a senior French diplomat in the Far East and had personal ties to the French Emperor. Montigny's winning over the Siamese Mission alienated many French diplomats, most notably Bourboulon and De Courcy.

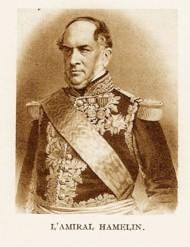
Admiral Ferdinand-Alphonse Hamelin the French Minister of Marines

France had been having problems of shortage of marine vessels in the Far East, with the steam corvette Marceau as the only warship available for Montigny. Admiral Hamelin the French Minister of Marines told Walewski that, due to situation of the ongoing Crimean War, there could be hardly any warships left for the Siamese Mission;

We do not find ourselves in India in conditions analogous to those of the British. Britain, in fact, possesses ports and shipbuilding facilities in those regions that allow it to maintain considerable naval forces there. France's possessions, on the contrary, from the point of view of naval resources they can offer, are limited to the island of Réunion, which can only provide our ships with a very imperfect shelter. It is, therefore, not surprising that the strength of the French naval station is much smaller than that of the forces that Britain maintains there.

Nevertheless, Walewski insisted that the mission needed at least two warships in order not to be inferior to Bowring's mission to Siam in 1855. Admiral Hamelin then entrusted the Rear Admiral Nicolas François Guérin the French naval commander in Réunion, who had been in Ryukyu, to find another warship for Montigny. Montigny's appointment to the Siamese Mission was applauded by the Paris Foreign Missions Society (MEP) as Montigny had been tending to the concerns of Christianity and missionaries in Asia. The Paris Foreign Missions Society congratulated Montigny on his appointment, affirming Montigny that all the French missionaries in Siam and Vietnam were at Montigny's command and promising that Bishop Jean-Baptiste Pallegoix of Siam would provide Montigny with translation. The MEP also deplored Montigny to address the issues of freedom of Christian proselytization in Siam and the Christian persecutions in Vietnam.

=== Objective of Montigny Mission ===
After failures of the two previous French envoys to actually go to Siam, Emperor Napoleon III of France officially appointed Charles de Montigny as the French plenipotentiary to Siam on 10 October 1855 as Siam under King Mongkut had become more open to formalize relations with Western nations. Montigny was later elevated to the Consul of the First Class (French: Consul de première classe) on October 24. Count Walewski drafted this upcoming Franco–Siamese Treaty, consisting of twenty-two articles, based on the Anglo–Siamese Bowring Treaty of 1855, the Sino–French Treaty of Whampoa of 1844 and the treaty that France had concluded with Imamate of Muscat in 1844. Townsend Harris the American plenipotentiary left New York on October 17, 1855, transversing the Atlantic, reaching Liverpool on October 28 and reaching Paris on November 1st.

On 22 November 1855, while Townsend Harris was in Paris, Count Walewski the French Foreign Minister officially issued instructions on the Siamese Mission to Montigny. The mission objective was to procure a commercial treaty with Siam with at least equal concessions that Siam had earlier surrendered to the British in the Bowring Treaty. Walewski gave the Bowring Treaty and his own twenty-two-article treaty draft to Montigny. Walewski told Montigny to adhere to the Bowring Treaty as the model. Walewski also allowed Montigny to improvise for any innovative terms and, if Siam refused to negotiate, Montigny might directly put forward the Bowring Treaty as the new treaty for France without any alterations. Montigny was also to introduce some clauses from the Whampoa Treaty that were not present in the Bowring Treaty including the unlimited French naval access, guarantee of security of French buildings and possessions, assistance in cases of shipwrecks and desertions.

Apart from this instruction on commercial aspect of the treaty, Montigny was also assigned a mission on the religious issue, which applied both to Siam and Vietnam as France had been promoting itself to be the global protector of Roman Catholic Church. Montigny was assigned to secure freedom of Christian evangelization and permission to build Catholic churches in Siam. After the supposedly-successful negotiation with Siam, Montigny was to go to Cambodia to settle some minor misunderstandings with King of Cambodia and to fetch an interpreter to go to Vietnam to peacefully demonstrate to the Vietnamese imperial court that the French Emperor was dissatisfied with Christian-banning decrees of the Vietnamese Emperor and Christian persecutions that had been going on, without using any excessive forces.

Count Walewski urged Montigny to seek advice and assistances from Frédéric Gauthier the French Consul in Singapore and Bishop Pallegoix in Siam, who had been residing in the region for a long time. Lastly, Walewski urged Montigny to leave as soon as possible as Montigny was scheduled to reach Singapore by March 1856, where the French warship Marceau would take Montigny to Siam. The 23-year-old young French diplomat Ernest-Napoléon Godeaux would also accompany Montigny on the mission as an apprentice, who would bring the Franco–Siamese Treaty back to Paris for ratification. Cardinal Carlo Sacconi the papal nuncio to France asked Montigny to have an audience with Pope Pius IX at Rome to put himself under the service of the pope and to discuss about the missionary activities in Asia. Comte de Rayneval the French ambassador to the Holy See also wrote to Walewski, asking for Montigny to go to Rome first. Montigny was then obliged to go to Rome before going on his mission to Southeast Asia.

Townsend Harris left Paris on November 26, reaching Marseilles on the next day on November 27, 1855. Harris left Marseilles on November 29, crossing the Mediterranean to reach Alexandria in Egypt on December 4th. On December 7th, Harris left from Suez on a British mail steamship to Southeast Asia, entering the Indian Ocean and reaching Galle in Ceylon on December 24, 1855.

=== Impassé of Montigny in Egypt ===
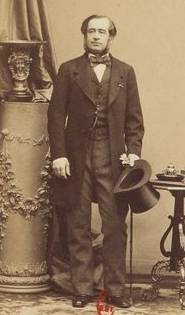
Alphonse de Rayneval the French ambassador to the Holy See, whose illness caused Montigny to stay in Rome for one month in January 1856

Charles de Montigny, along with his diplomatic troupe and his family, left Paris on 30 December 1855. Montigny was obliged to go to Rome first to have an audience with Pope Pius IX. However, Montingy found out that Comte de Rayneval the French ambassador in Rome had been ill so Montigny had to wait for one month for Rayneval to recover in order to have the audience with the pope.

Harry Parkes had earlier brought the Bowring Treaty to London for ratification. The Queen's Advocate pointed out that some treaty terms were vague and ill-defined, especially the clause concerning the jurisdiction over British subjects in Siam, which stated that the British Consul would oversee the British subjects jointly with Siamese officials but the Queen's Advocate suggested that the British subjects should be put under exclusive British consular jurisdiction without any interferences from the Siamese government. Harry Parkes was then assigned to return to Siam to amend these treaty terms. While Montigny was in Rome, Harry Parkes left London in January 1856, passing through Paris and continuing to Marseilles. There had been a regular passenger mail ship service by the British Peninsular Oriental Company departing from Marseilles, going through Alexandria by train to Suez and taking another mail ship to Singapore. Harry Parkes took a mail ship of the Peninsular Oriental Company, departing from Marseilles in January.

Also in January 1856, Sir John Bowring at Hong Kong informed the Siamese government about appointment of Montigny as the French envoy to Siam. Lord Cowley the British ambassador to France told Walewski that Sir John Bowring would offer any assistances to Montigny in his Siamese Mission and hoped that Walewski would also empower Montigny to conclude a similar commercial treaty with Vietnam, apart from Siam, in accordance with Bowring's multi-nation approach on Vietnam.

Townsend Harris the American envoy left Ceylon on January 13, arriving in Penang on January 19, 1856. French corvette Capricieuse, which carried French gifts to the Siamese king including the life-sized portraits of the French Emperor Napoleon and Empress Eugénie, departed from Toulon on 19 January 1856.

In his meeting with the Pope Pius in February 1856, Montigny reminded the pope of France's unrelenting contributions to the Catholic Mission in Asia, to which the pope resonated by expressing his gratitude for France. After finishing his business in Rome, Montigny and his entourage traveled to Alexandria in Egypt, intending to catch a mail ship for further journey to Asia. However, the Crimean War led to shortage of passenger vessels. The mail ship scheduled to leave Alexandria for Singapore in March 1856 had been fully-booked, as well as the April ship. Montigny had to speak to the high authorities of the Peninsular Oriental Company in order to secure his seat.

During Montigny's impassé in Egypt, Harry Parkes the British envoy arrived in Penang on 25 February 1856, where he met his American counterpart Townsend Harris. Parkes and Harris discussed their upcoming negotiations with Siam and Parkes gave a copy of Bowring Treaty to Harris. Parkes then left Penang for Singapore.

Harry Parkes had been in hurry to meet the deadline of bringing the ratified Bowring Treaty back to Siamese government. Harry Parkes, with British frigate HMS Auckland, arrived at the river bar of the Siamese Chaophraya River on 12 March 1856, bringing with him the royal letter from Queen Victoria of the United Kingdom. The two Siamese kings were delighted upon knowing that Parkes had brought the British royal letter with him as this was the first British royal letter (Sir James Brooke and Sir John Bowring did not bring royal letter.). In traditional Siamese diplomacy, a royal letter was the most important aspect of diplomatic mission where the dignity resided, not in the person of the envoy, who served only as a mere carrier of sanctity in the royal letter. Siamese preparation for the arrival of the British royal letter caused the Auckland to remain stuck at the river bar.

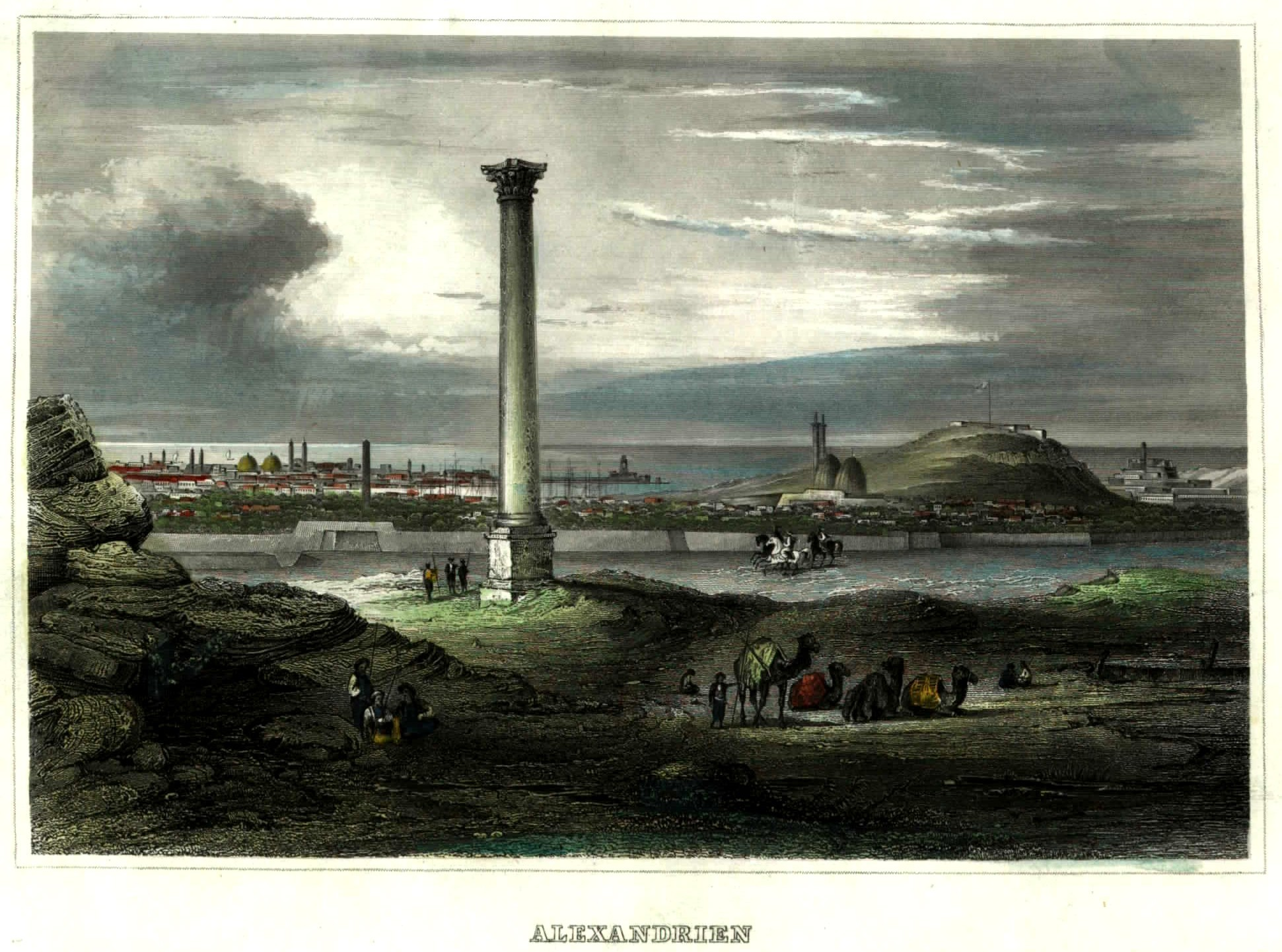
Montigny was stranded in Alexandria in Egypt for two months from February to April 1856 for his inability to procure a British mail ship to travel to Singapore.

Rear Admiral Guérin the French naval commander at Macau sent two French corvettes Constantine and Nissus under capitaine de vaisseau Tardy de Montravel for Montigny's Siamese Mission. Tardy de Montravel brought the Constantine and the Nisus to reach Singapore on 16 March 1856. On 19 March 1856, at Alexandria, Montigny wrote a letter to Guérin, reminding Guérin of the importance of Montigny's mission as Montigny had been entrusted by both the French Emperor and the Pope to negotiate with Siam and Vietnam. As Siam had been putting high emphasis on external appearance and grandeur, not meeting Siam's expectations would compromise Montigny's mission. Moreover, ever since Lapierre's bombardment of Danang in 1847, nine years ago, not a single French ship visited Vietnam. Montigny's arrival in Vietnam would be a dangerous endeavor if Guérin did not provide Montigny with strong warships, or else Montigny, his colleagues and his family would be killed by the Vietnamese. Unbeknownst to Montigny, Guérin had already provided Montigny with two warships waiting for him in Singapore.

=== Parkes Mission in Siam ===
As Siam took some time to prepare for the reception ceremony of Queen Victoria's royal letter, the British frigate Auckland could only enter Siam on 23 March 1856 after spending ten days on the river bar. Like the Rattler in 1855, the Auckland was only allowed to proceed up to the Pong Patchamit Fort, not going to the actual Bangkok Fort. Harry Parkes was received with more pomp ceremonies than Bowring as the Siamese grand reception ceremony of the British royal letter took place at Dusit Maha Prasat Throne Hall, where Harry Parkes delivered the letter to the hand of King Mongkut. Parkes then presented a plethora of gifts to Mongkut, including several portraits of Queen Victoria. The gifts were so abundant that Siamese scribes could not record all of them.

On 24 March 1856, at Quai d'Orsay, influenced by Bowring's request, Count Walewski issued additional instruction to Montigny to conclude a commercial treaty with Vietnam in similar manner with Siam. As Montigny was stranded in Egypt, Walewski sent this new directive directly to Singapore waiting for Montigny there.

Townsend Harris the American envoy, on USS San Jacinto, left Penang and then arrived in Singapore on April 4, 1856, in his preparation for the Siamese Mission. At Singapore, Harris saw two French corvettes Constantine and Nisus that had been waiting for Montigny. Harris also learned that two additional French corvettes, Marceau and Catinat, might also join the mission to Siam, bringing the total number of French ships to four. Seeing such grandeur of French mission, in comparison with his own mission, which contained only one ship, Harris decided that he should hurry to finish his negotiation with Siam before arrival of Montigny, or else his mission in Siam would be delayed.

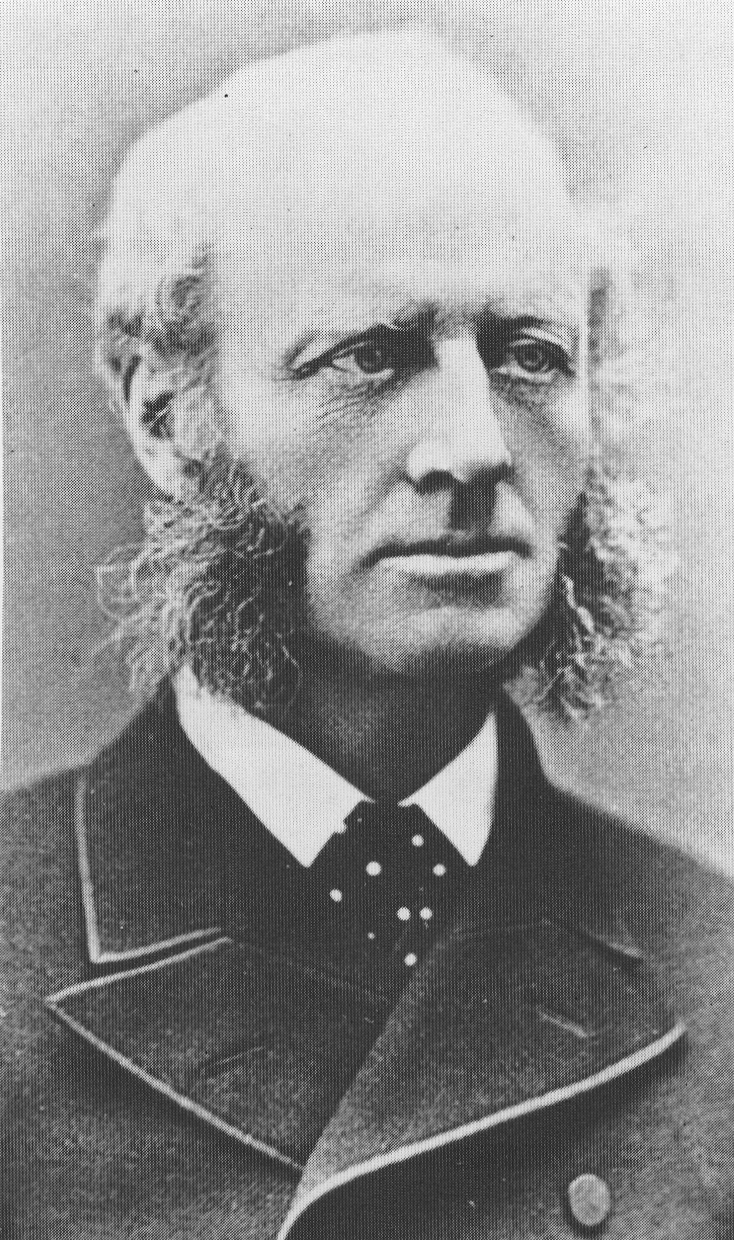
Harry Parkes, called Haripak in Thai chronicles, was the Second Envoy of the Bowring Mission in 1855, brought the Bowring Treaty back from London to Siam in March 1856 and proposed amendments of the treaty, which were signed in May.

On 5 April 1856, the Bowring Treaty, which had earlier been ratified by the British government and brought back by Harry Parkes, was ratified by the Siamese government in a ceremony. King Mongkut then appointed five Siamese plenipotentiaries to negotiate the amendment of treaty terms with Harry Parkes. They were Prince Wongsathirat Sanit, Somdet Ong Noi That Bunnag, Chaophraya Si Suriyawong Chuang Bunnag the Kalahom, Phrakhlang Kham Bunnag and the newcomer Chaophraya Yommarat Nuch. Earlier, Mongkut saw the Anglo–Japanese Convention of 1854 and became dissatisfied towards Chuang Bunnag the chief supporter of Bowring Treaty as Mongkut saw that Siam had conceded to Britain much more than that Japan had conceded. During this Parkes negotiation, Chuang Bunnag was sidelined in favor of his rival and uncle Somdet Ong Noi, while Mongkut himself also closely monitored the process.

As the Parkes negotiation was going on in Siam, Townsend Harris left Singapore on April 8 with the San Jacinto, arriving at the Siamese river bar on April 13, 1856. However, Harris could not begin his negotiations with Siam, who had been preoccupied with Harry Parkes. Parkes proposed to the Siamese commissioners that British subjects in Siam should be placed under exclusive jurisdiction of British Consul without any involvement of Siamese government. The Siamese were reluctant to surrender such power to the British Consul but eventually the Siamese conceded because they did not yet have a clear protocol of appointing Siamese officials to assist the British in a mixed court. Distances of four miles and twenty-four-hour journey from Bangkok were also demarcated.

Eventually, Charles de Montigny, his colleagues and his family were able to board on the British mail ship Bombay at Suez on 21 April 1856, travelling to Asia. On the Bombay, Montigny had booked ten berths for his entourage but John Paterson, the British captain of the Bombay, only gave Montigny five berths, causing the ladies to stand with luggages for many hours. Dissatisfied, Montigny went to see Paterson, asking to see the ship's plan to find out why there was no room left. Paterson allegedly responded with angry protest and refusal.

Tardy de Montravel, who had been waiting for Montigny with his two corvettes Constantine and Nisus at Singapore for one month, realized that, when Montigny arrived, he had to enter the Gulf of Siam in May, when the southwestern monsoon was strongest, not the best safety choice for sea travel. Montravel then decided to pull his ships away from Singapore to Réunion, not waiting for Montigny. Montravel, the Constantine and the Nisus left Singapore on April 29, robbing Montigny of two warships for him on his mission. Rear Admiral Guérin sent a report to the French Ministry of Marines that he had sent two warships waiting for Montigny at Singapore but they had to be withdrawn due to unfortunate delay of Montigny and unfavorable seasonal conditions. Guérin's report caused an uproar in the Ministry of Marines, who harshly condemned Montigny for his delay. Some even called for René de Courcy at Macau to replace Montigny as French envoy to Siam. Montigny was allowed to retain his credentials only because he had been the most senior French diplomat in the Far East.

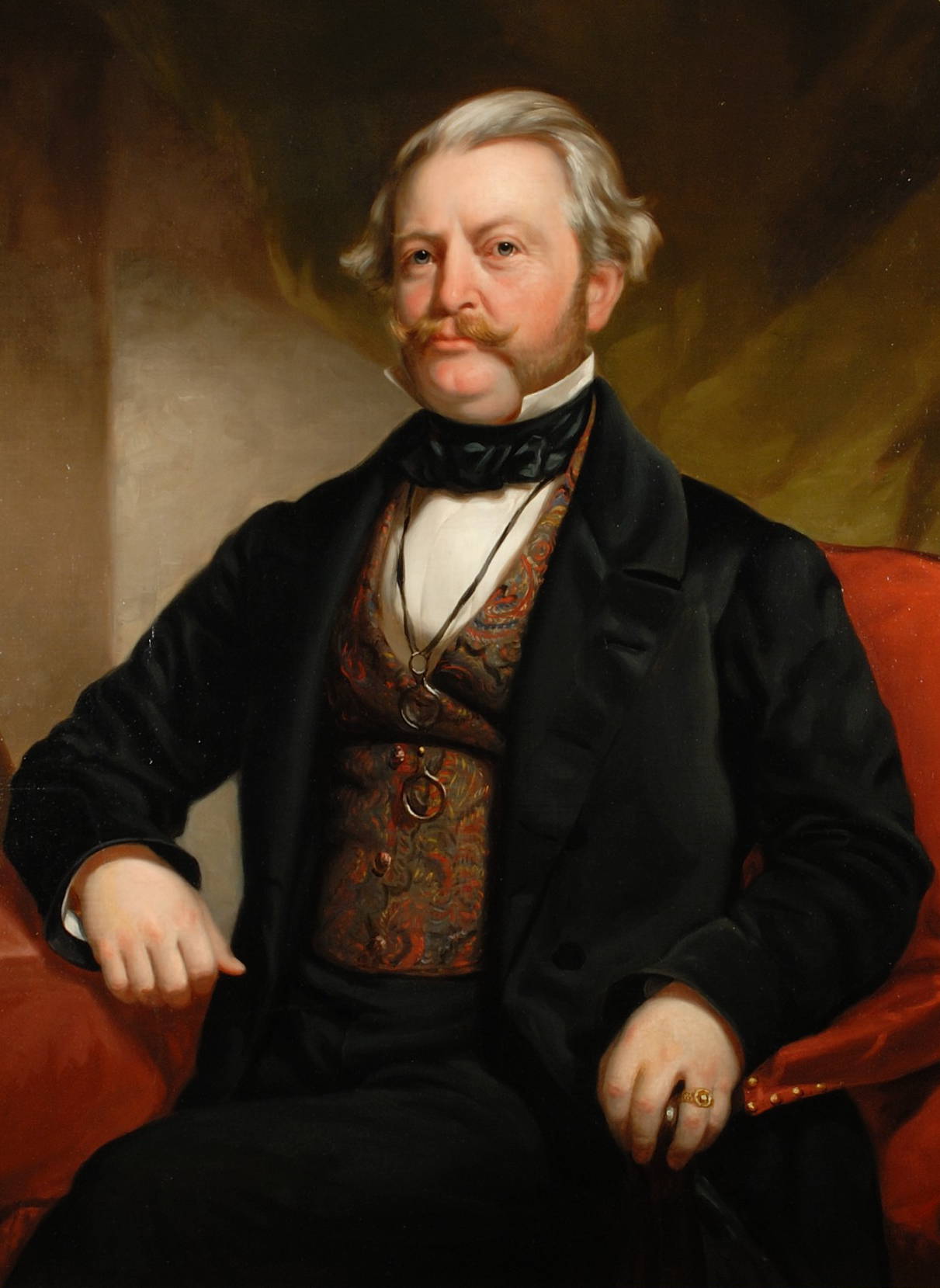
Townsend Harris, appointed by President Franklin Pierce as Consul General to Japan, was commissioned to conclude the American–Siamese Treaty of May 1856 before his journey to Japan.

Townsend Harris the American envoy, who had been kept waiting in Bangkok, was granted an official grand audience with the Siamese king Mongkut on May 1st, 1856 at Dusit Maha Prasat Throne Hall. Harris rode on a sedan chair carried on the shoulders of Siamese porters to enter the Siamese royal palace. During the audience with Mongkut, Harris delivered the presidential letter into the king's hand and presented many gifts including a portrait of President Franklin Pierce. Despite having the audience, Harris was still unable to begin his businesses as Siam was still negotiating with Harry Parkes.

=== Montigny in Singapore ===
Montigny was reportedly harassed by Paterson the British captain of Bombay through his journey, arriving at Galle in Ceylon on 4 May 1856. At Galle, Montigny found the French corvette Catinat under the command of capitaine de frégate Le Lieur de Ville-sur-Arce. Montigny personally told Le Lieur that the Crimean War had been effectively over by the Treaty of Paris of March 1856 and asked Le Lieur to take the Catinat to join Montigny's mission to Siam and Vietnam.

The Parkes negotiation in Siam dragged on into early May 1856. As Harry Parkes was running out of his provisions on the Auckland, he urged the Siamese government to yield to his proposals. Harry Parkes' supplementary articles to the Bowring Treaty were eventually signed on 13 May 1856 and Parkes hurriedly left Siam two days later on May 15, returning to Singapore. After the conclusion of the Parkes Treaty, King Mongkut appointed the same five Siamese commissioners to negotiate the American–Siamese Treaty with Townsend Harris, who was dissatisfied that Siam had kept him waiting for a whole month as Siam was unable to simultaneously deal with both Parkes and Harris at the same time.

Montigny and his entourage then took another British ship Norma from Galle to Singapore, arriving in Singapore on 16 May 1856. At Singapore, Montigny met two surprises. First, Frédéric Gauthier the French Consul in Singapore gave Montigny Walewski's new assignment for Montigny to conclude a commercial treaty with Vietnam, apart from remonstrating the Christian persecution. Second, Montigny learned that the two French corvettes Constantine and Nisus had been waiting for Montigny in Singapore but left before Montigny's arrival. Montigny found the steam corvette Marceau to be dissatisfyingly small, unable to face even a Chinese pirate ship. Per Montigny's calculation, the large corvette Capricieuse, which carried the French gifts for the Siamese king and had left Toulon on January 19, would not arrive in Singapore until June and Montigny would be unable to initiate his mission before that. Montigny wrote a letter to Walewski, expressing his regret at his loss of the Constantine and the Nisus but also reassuring Walewski that, with two French corvettes Catinat and Capricieuse, accompanied by the small corvette Marceau, his mission to Siam would be adequate.

Gauthier the French Consul in Singapore advised Montigny that the success of his Siamese Mission depended entirely on the presentation and the number of ships was important as the Siamese king had been asking the missionaries whether France had any warships because he had not seen one. Gauthier suggested Montigny to formally request the Quai d'Orsay to allow the commanders of the Catinat and the Capricieuse to accompany Montigny to Siam and Vietnam all through his mission. Montigny at Singapore wasted his time again by waiting for the Capricieuse to arrive. Montigny's plan for Vietnam was that Montigny would demonstrate to the Vietnamese imperial court that he was backed by Britain and Siam. An introduction letter from the King of Siam to the Vietnamese Emperor on behalf of Montigny would facilitate his entry into Vietnam and Montigny would be empowered by telling Vietnam at British warships would soon follow him to arrive.

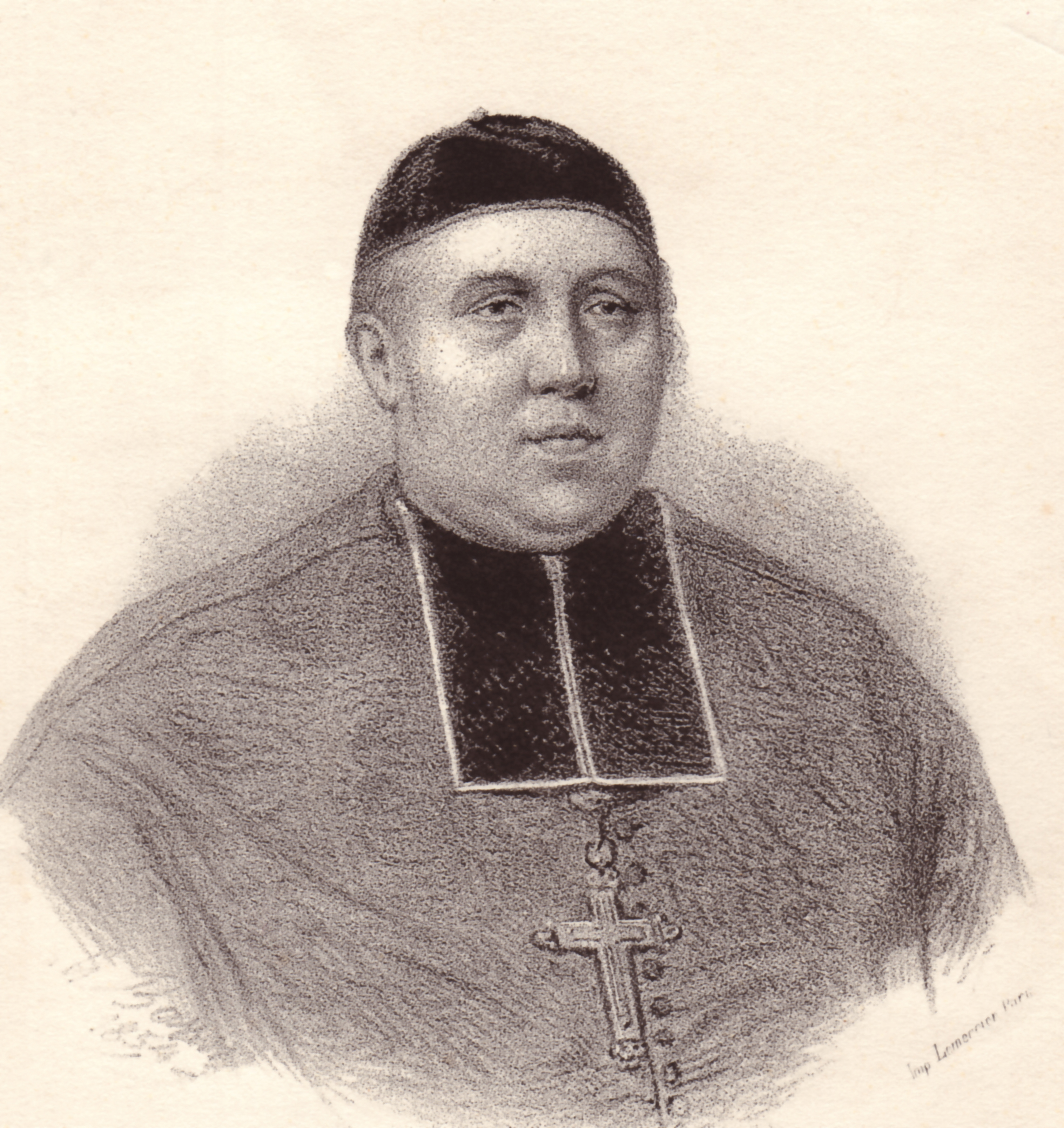
Jean-Baptiste Pallegoix the Apostolic Vicar of Eastern Siam and a French missionary who had been residing in Siam since 1830.

Harry Parkes returned from Siam to Singapore and met with Montigny. Parkes recounted his diplomatic mission in Siam to Montigny that he had to spend a whole month negotiating but assured Montigny that his prospective Siamese Mission would be successful because the Siamese king and his commissioners were amicable. Montigny was relieved that he would enter Siam after departures of the British and the Americans. A British merchant in Singapore named Read told an opposite story to Montigny, saying that Parkes had left a bad impression on the Siamese court by refusing to listen to any Siamese proposals. Montigny then wrote to Bishop Jean-Baptiste Pallegoix the Apostolic Vicar of Eastern Siam, who had been residing in Bangkok since 1830, to ask the Siamese king Mongkut to write a letter introducing Montigny to the Emperor of Vietnam, according to his plan. Captaine Le Lieur and his corvette Catinat reached Singapore on 28 May 1856.

In order to make up for his mistake of surrendering too much Siamese concessions to the British in recent treaties, Chaophraya Si Suriyawong Chuang Bunnag attempted to grant less concessions to Americans than that Siam had earlier conceded to the British but Townsend Harris insisted that the United States would be accorded at least the same concession as Britain. Siam eventually had to grant the same concessions to the Americans in the same manner that Siam had given to the British. The American–Siamese Treaty of Amity and Commerce was signed on May 29, 1856. Townsend Harris left Siam with negative sentiment, saying he wished he would never be assigned to Siam again. Harris then left Siam on May 31 to assume his position as the Consul General of Japan.

At Singapore, Montigny wrote to his rival René de Courcy at Macau on May 30, telling De Courcy not to hold against him and saying "Remember, my young friend, that I am finishing my career and you are beginning yours." Montigny also wrote a letter to Sir John Bowring at Hong Kong, thanking Bowring for suggesting to Walewski that Montigny should also be empowered to conclude a commercial treaty with Vietnam and asking Bowring to allow Montigny to invoke Bowring's name in his approach to Vietnam. Bowring granted Montigny the permission to tell the Vietnamese court that Bowring was going to arrive in Vietnam with British warships after Montigny.

Bishop Pallegoix at Bangkok, however, replied to Montigny's letter that the French Catholic Mission in Siam was at Montigny's disposal but it would be inappropriate to ask the King of Siam to write to the Emperor of Vietnam because Siam and Vietnam had ceased their relations for many years, having waged war with each other for more than ten years. Siamese royal letter to Vietnam would be of no use. Montigny, knowing next to nothing about regional history, was upset by this reply of Pallegoix. Montigny replied to Pallegoix explaining that he was going into an anti-Western polity with three warships and, without the introduction letter, misunderstanding would lead to confrontation. Montigny also asserted that the Siamese king helping Montigny would be his first act of courtesy for the French Emperor. This incident led to a conflict between Montigny and the bishop.

Montigny continued to wait for the arrival of the Capricieuse at Singapore into mid-June 1856. Captain Le Lieur of the Catinat told Montigny that if the Capricieuse did not arrive soon he was obliged to bring the Catinat to join Rear Admiral Guérin in Macau. Montigny had to send a request to Guérin asking for permission for Le Lieur to stay with Montigny on his diplomatic mission, which Guérin granted. Corvette Capricieuse eventually arrived in Singapore on 15 June 1856, along with its commander capitaine de vaisseau Jules Collier and the gifts for the Siamese monarch. Coincidentally, June 15 was also the birthday of Prince Imperial so the French in Singapore celebrated the princely birthday by decorating the Capricieuse with French flags, firing three salutatory cannon shots and chanting of Te Deum on the Capricieuse and at the Church of the Good Shepherd in Singapore. Both Captain Collier of the Capricieuse and Captain Le Lieur of the Catinat were allowed to accompany Montigny on his whole mission to Siam and Vietnam.

== Montigny Mission in Siam ==
=== Arrival of Montigny in Siam ===
Charles de Montigny (called Mongtikni in Thai chronicles) the French Consul of Shanghai and the French imperial plenipotentiary appointed by Emperor Napoleon III, left Singapore on 29 June 1856 along with his family and his colleagues the 24-year-old young French diplomat Ernest-Napoléon Godeaux and capitaine de vaisseau Jules Collier, who was the commander of all three corvettes accompanying Montigny in his mission, which consisted of;

- Large sailing corvette Capricieuse, without a steam engine, under personal command of Collier, who was accorded by Montigny the rank of "Commodore". The Capricieuse also contained the gifts for the Siamese monarch.
- Steam corvette Catinat under the command of capitaine de frégate Le Lieur de Ville-sur-Arce
- Small steam corvette Marceau under command of lieutenant de vaisseau Le Fer de la Motte. The Marceau was the main vessel for Montigny and his family to reside.

The three French warships faced strong southwestern monsoon winds. During his journey, Montigny conducted a scientific experiment on a sea snake but ended up having his finger pierced by the snake fang. As the poison of a sea snake was lethal, the ship surgeon performed a surgery to cauterize the bitten site to prevent the spread of the poison but Montigny still had the symptoms of fever, chill and nausea. Montigny even gave instruction that if Montigny died from the sea snake poison, Captain Collier would take over his mission but eventually Montigny survived.

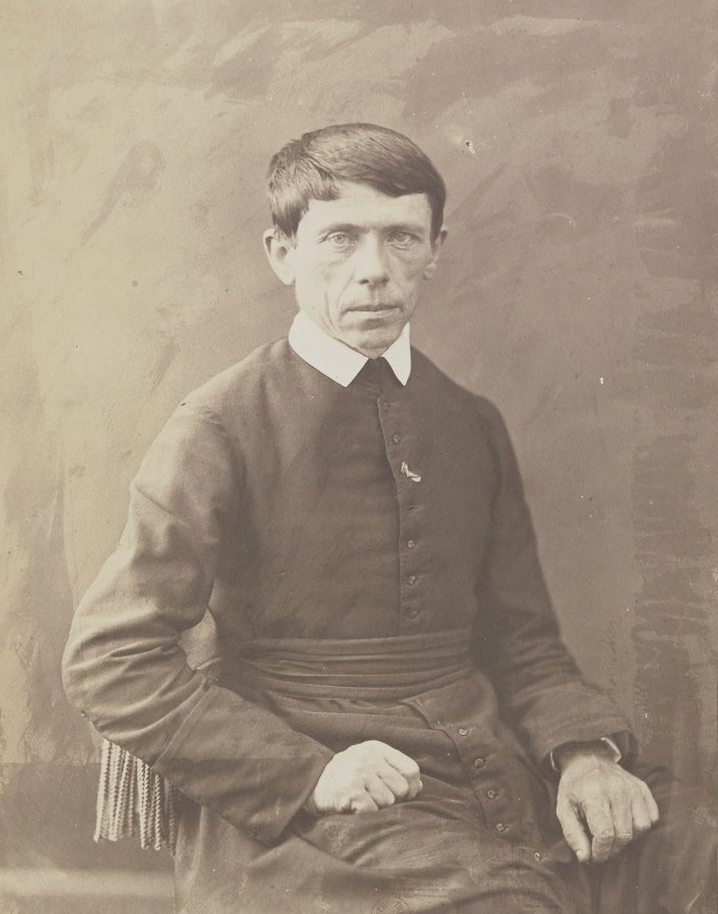
Louis Larnaudie the abbot of Saint Joseph Church of Ayutthaya from Paris Foreign Missions Society served as the interpreter for Charles de Montigny the French plenipotentiary to Siam in 1856.

Montigny, along with his entourage and the three French warships, arrived at the river bar at the mouth of Chaophraya River on 9 July 1856. The river bar is a 100-kilometer crescent of deposited sediments, a major obstable to naval passage. The hull of any ships going into the Siamese river should not be deeper that eleven feet or else the ship would run aground. Bishop Jean-Baptiste Pallegoix the Apostolic Vicar of Siam had already sent Father Louis Larnaudie the abbot of Saint Joseph Church of Ayutthaya to be the interpreter for Montigny in Siam. Father Larnaudie had been waiting for Montigny at the river bar.

At the river bar, Montigny sent his assistant Godeaux to announce the arrival of the French envoy to Phraya Samut Buranurak the Siamese governor of Paknam Samut Prakarn. Through Godeaux, Montigny demanded that Siamese should treat him, as the French imperial plenipotentiary, with at least the same pomp and grandeur the Siamese had received Chevalier de Chaumont, Sir John Bowring and Harry Parkes before him or else he would not disembark. Montigny requested to reside in the British Factory, a Western-style mansion near Wat Prayurawong temple that had previously received Bowring in 1855 and other British envoys since 1822. However, after the departure of Harry Parkes, the Siamese government had leased the house to Charles Hillier the first-ever British Consul in Siam. Phraya Samut Buranurak reported to the Siamese government about the arrival of the French envoy. Charles Hillier the British Consul refused to move out to make room for Montigny, telling the Siamese that France was a faraway nation that would rarely come so Siam should not care much. Hillier also pointed out that Montigny could reside in the thatched-roof bamboo house that Townsend Harris the American envoy had stayed. Montigny retaliated Hillier by saying that France was a great nation with justice and desire for perpetual friendship with Siam.

The five Siamese commissioners held an urgent meeting to decide on the matter. The solution was that King Mongkut would annul the lease of the British Factory to Consul Hillier in order for Hillier to move out. Hillier, however, was persistent, refusing to move out. Prince Kromma Luang Wongsa and Chaophraya Si Suriyawong Chuang Bunnag then asked the king to allow Montigny to reside in the mansion of the deceased Somdet Chaophraya Ong Yai Dit Bunnag who had just earlier died in April 1855, to which Mongkut agreed. Chaophraya Phrakhlang Kham Bunnag then wrote to inform Montigny at the river bar on July 11 that it had been arranged for Montigny to stay in the mansion of the deceased Siamese Chief Minister, where the Bowring Treaty was signed, the place that was even more pomp that the British Factory. Montigny was satisfied with this arrangement.

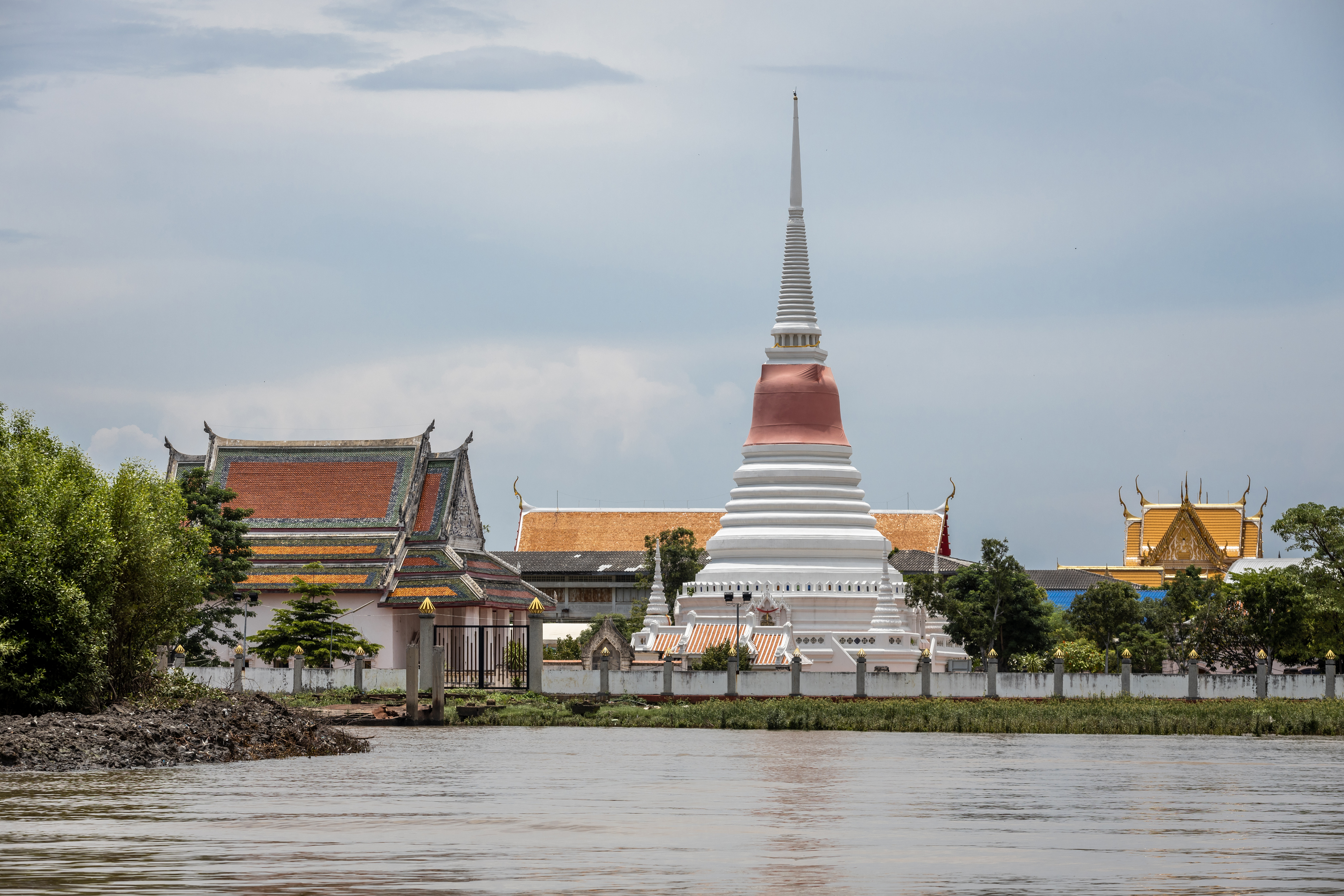
Montigny observed that the Phra Samut Chedi Pagoda at Samut Prakarn was shaped like a gigantic bell surmounted by a spire.

King Mongkut sent Chaophraya Si Suriyawong Chuang Bunnag and Phraya Montri Suriyawong Chum Bunnag to bring a steamship to receive Montigny at Paknam Samut Prakarn. From Samut Prakarn, Chum Bunnag rode the steamship to greet Montigny on the Marceau at the river bar on 12 July 1856 and to bring Montigny to Samut Prakarn. On that day, Montigny on the Marceau crossed the river bar with difficulty as the steam engine propelled the corvette. The Marceau arrived at Samut Prakarn, where Montigny observed the Phra Samut Chedi Pagoda.

Next morning, on July 13, the Siamese at Samut Prakarn fired 21-gun salute for Montigny. Phra Wisetsongkhram Pascoal Ribeiro led the way for Montigny to disembark from the Marceau with Godeaux and Larnaudie as the Siamese fired 17-gun salute and the Siamese military band played God Save The Queen. Si Suriyawong Chuang Bunnag, whom Montigny called Kalahom (Kalaoum) led the Siamese soldiers dressed in British military costume to greet Montigny in military columns. Chuang Bunnag spoke to Montigny in English language, ensuring Montigny that he would be received with appropriate ceremonies and expressing his joy that the Franco–Siamese relation was renewed after long hiatus since the seventeenth century. Chuang Bunnag then told Montigny that Siam needed a powerful nation like France to protect Siam from aggressive neighbor, indirectly referring to the British. Montigny responded to this sensitive question with neutral stance, staying that the prospective France–Siamese Treaty would guarantee Siam's security.

Montigny was impressed by Chuang Bunnag; "His Excellency the Kalaoum seemed to me truly a remarkable man, even in Europe, he is indeed the first head of the Kingdom." Montigny learned that the Kalahom had forty-five brothers and his father the late Somdet Ong Yai Dit Bunnag, whose house Montigny was going to reside, had been the Prime Minister and the Somdet of the previous reign. In that evening, Chuang Bunnag, along with his younger brother Phraya Montri Suriyawong Chum Bunnag and his son Chaomuen Waiworanat Won Bunnag came on the Marceau to have a Western-style dinner with Montigny and his family. After the dinner, as the three Bunnags descended from the Marceau, Montigny had his warship salute them with seventeen cannon shots.

=== Arrival of Montigny in Bangkok ===
On 13 July 1856, twenty-five Siamese royal barges came down from Bangkok to fetch Montigny's entourage but Montigny requested that Siam allow him to bring his warship up to Bangkok to salute the Siamese royal flag, to which the Siamese surprisingly consented. Montigny required Captain Jules Collier to leave the two corvettes Catinat and Capricieuse at the river bar for Collier to command the Marceau to go upstream to Bangkok. Captain Collier weighted the anchor of the Marceau at Samut Prakarn on July 14, bringing Montigny and his family to Bangkok. Montigny complimented Bangkok was the "Venice of the East" and a fairytale city; "No European city, and perhaps no other in the world, however picturesque, can evoke such an impression."

Montigny on the Marceau reached Bangkok on 14 July 1856, anchoring at the Pong Patchamit Fort about 2.5 kilometers downstream from the actual Bangkok Fort in modern Khlong San. The Marceau fired twenty-one salute cannon shots and the Siamese reciprocated with seventeen salutatory cannon shots. At Pong Patchamit, Prince Wongsa the king's younger half-brother brought all the five Siamese royal commissioners to greet Montigny on the Marceau. Vice-king Pinklao the Second King of Siam also wrote a greeting letter to Montigny. Montigny was informed that there were about 400,000 inhabitants of Bangkok, of which 250,000 were Siamese, 100,000 were Chinese and the rest of 50,000 were Mon, Malay, Vietnamese and the Portuguese Mestizos.

The next day, on July 15, as Montigny was preparing to disembark from the Marceau at Pong Patchamit, the Marceau fired salute cannon shots but a French cannon exploded, amputating arms of two French soldiers and the whole ceremony had to stop. Vice-king Pinklao wrote to Montigny expressing condolences to the accident. The Bunnag brothers Kalahom Chuang Bunnag and Phrakhlang Kham Bunnag led Montigny to the house of their late father Somdet Dit Bunnag, where Montigny and his family would reside during his mission in Siam. Montigny noticed that the houses of the late Somdet, the houses of Kalahom, Phrakhlang and Somdet Ong Noi, all of whom were of the same (Bunnag) family, were in the same vicinity. King Mongkut granted two royal barges with canopies and sixty oarsmen for Montigny's personal use. Mongkut also assigned Chuang Bunnag's son Chaomuen Waiworanat Won Bunnag and Father Larnaudie the interpreter to tend to Montigny's personal needs.

On 21 July 1856, the Siamese king Mongkut requested Montigny to have a private audience. Bishop Pallegoix and Abbé Larnaudie led Montigny, who rode on a sedan chair carried on the shoulders of eight Siamese porters, to visit the king at the Siamese royal palace. Montigny waited outside of the Amarin Winitchai Throne Hall, where the Bowring Mission had been received in 1855 and Montigny's private audience with the king was going to take place. Montigny, however, was kept waiting for a rather long time. Montigny told the Siamese that punctuality was an important part of Western diplomatic protocol and the French imperial plenipotentiary should not be kept waiting for a long time. Montigny then sent Bishop Pallegoix into the Throne Hall, where Mongkut asked Pallegoix how should he receive the French envoy. Montigny's mission to Siam presented a new challenge to the Siamese elites, who had learned English to deal with the British and the Americans but knew no French. Pallegoix replied that the king might converse with Montigny in English language. The Siamese king was surprised to learn that the French envoy also understood English but Pallegoix affirmed him.

Montigny was eventually admitted into the Throne Hall, where Siamese royal princes and officials prostrated on the floor. The interior of the hall was decorated in Western-style. Montigny was allowed to stand conversing with King Mongkut, who sat on the throne, not having to prostrate. Montigny noticed that King Mongkut looked like King Louis IX and spoke English more fluently than his subjects. Montigny had been informed that Mongkut had learned English from American missionaries and also studied history of the European dynasties. Montigny thanked King Mongkut for such warm reception. Mongkut asked whether Montigny had brought a letter from the French Emperor with him. The Siamese had been expecting letters from the sovereigns of the incoming envoys. Montigny, who did not bring a letter from Napoleon III, replied that the French Emperor only wrote letters to nations that had already established relations with France and he was sure that if the Siamese king wrote a letter to the French Emperor, he would reply in kind.

King Mongkut asked further why did France wait for Britain and the United States to conclude treaties with Siam in order for France to send a plenipotentiary to do the same. Montigny explained that France had sent Rear Admiral Laguerre as the French envoy to Siam but the war with Russia kept Laguerre from actually arriving in Siam. Montigny also pointed out that Gauthier the French Consul at Singapore had earlier notified Siam of imminent arrival of Laguerre in 1853. Mongkut mentioned that Sir John Bowring had earlier informed the Siamese government about appointment of Montigny as the French envoy to Siam. Montigny quickly asserted that France was a powerful nation, who did not require British approval nor British mediation in her venture with Siam. King Mongkut reportedly smiled at this patriotic reply of Montigny.

=== Montigny's grand audience with King Mongkut ===
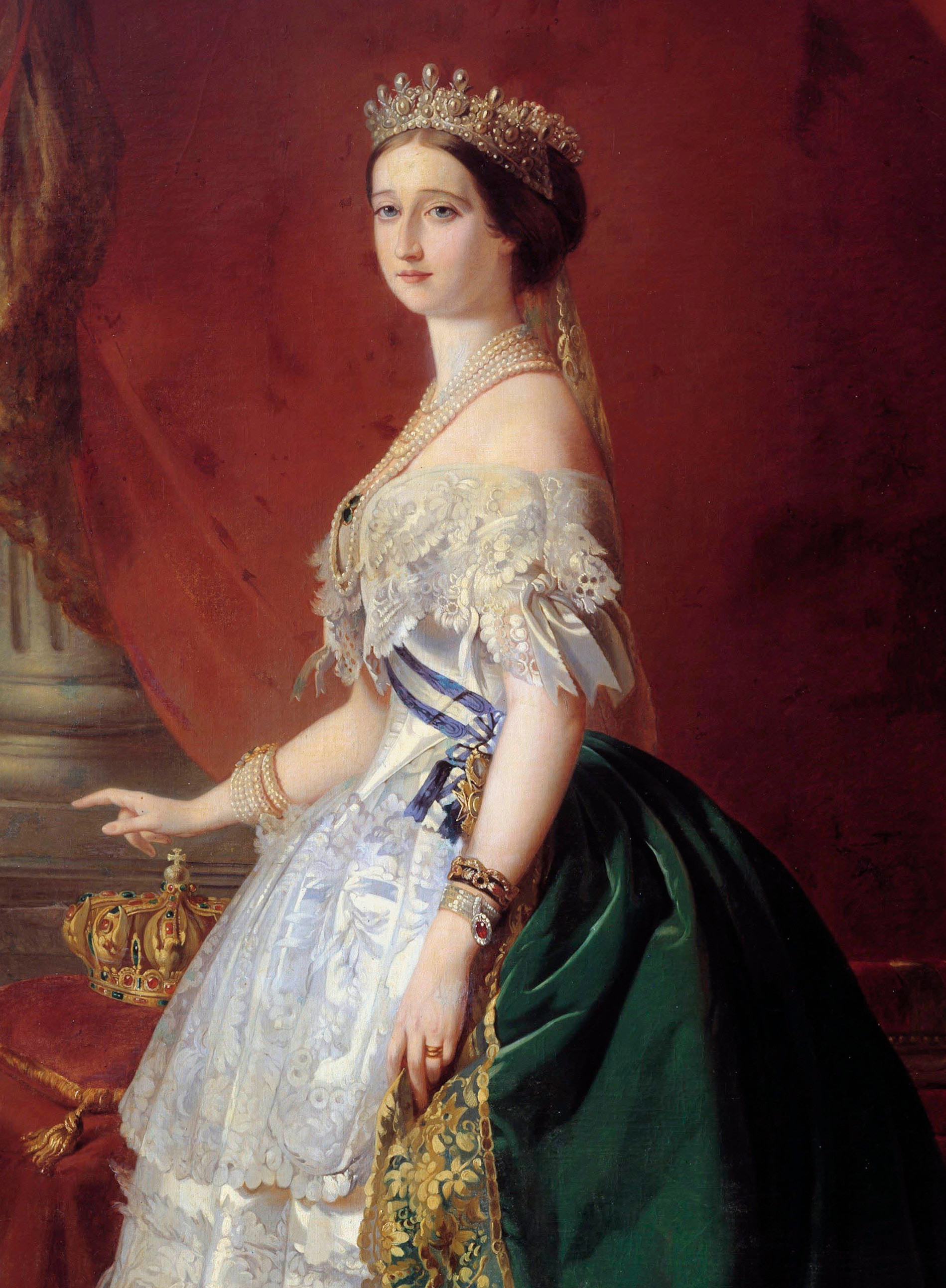
Portrait of Empress Eugénie, original work by German painter Franz Xaver Winterhalter in 1853

Montigny's grand audience with King Mongkut was scheduled by Siamese astrologers to be on 24 July 1856 at Dusit Maha Prasat Throne Hall, where Harry Parkes and Townsend Harris had been received. Montigny arranged that his procession took place in daylight, in contrast to the audiences of Parkes and Harris, which took place after sunset, in order for the Siamese to clearly observe the grandeur of French diplomatic mission. On July 23, Montigny unveiled the life-sized portraits of Emperor Napoleon and Empress Eugénie, which were copies of the original work of the German painter Franz Xaver Winterhalter, at Montigny's residence. Siamese ministers and officials came to see the portraits. Kalahom Chuang Bunnag asked Montigny in English language whether French women were as beautiful as Empress Eugénie, to which Montigny replied that most French women were beautiful but the Empress was the fairest of them.

On the day of grand audience, on July 24, Siamese gilded royal barges flocked to Montigny's residence. The procession, which would transport Montigny from his residence to the Siamese royal palace, commenced at one o'clock in the afternoon. Portraits of the French Emperor and Empress were placed on the main barge, on a throne under a canopy with red roof and white curtains, rowed by sixty Siamese oarsmen. Montigny's barge, also rowed by sixty oarsmen, which he shared seats with Captain Collier, Godeaux and Father Larnaudie, followed the main barge that contained the portraits. Following Montigny's barge were the barge of Bishop Pallegoix and twenty other royal barges, all gilded and having the bows of Siamese mythological beasts. Montigny observed that the riparian procession extended beyond the horizon in the river.

Montigny's riparian procession reached the royal palace on two o'clock, where the Siamese fired twenty-one salute cannon shots and fired additional seventeen shots to pay respect to Montigny. Siamese officials paraded the two portraits down from the royal barge into the palace, flanked at both sides by two columns of Siamese soldiers. Montigny disembarked from his barge and he was greeted by columns of four hundred Siamese soldiers. Montigny rode on a sedan chair carried on the shoulders of Siamese porters to enter the palace. Montigny observed multi-ethnic Siamese military forces, including Siamese, Lao, Khmer and Vietnamese. Montigny saw royal war elephants, some of them as high as fifteen feet. Montigny also noticed the female royal guards, who carried bayonets and sabers, whom Montigny called the "Amazones of the King".

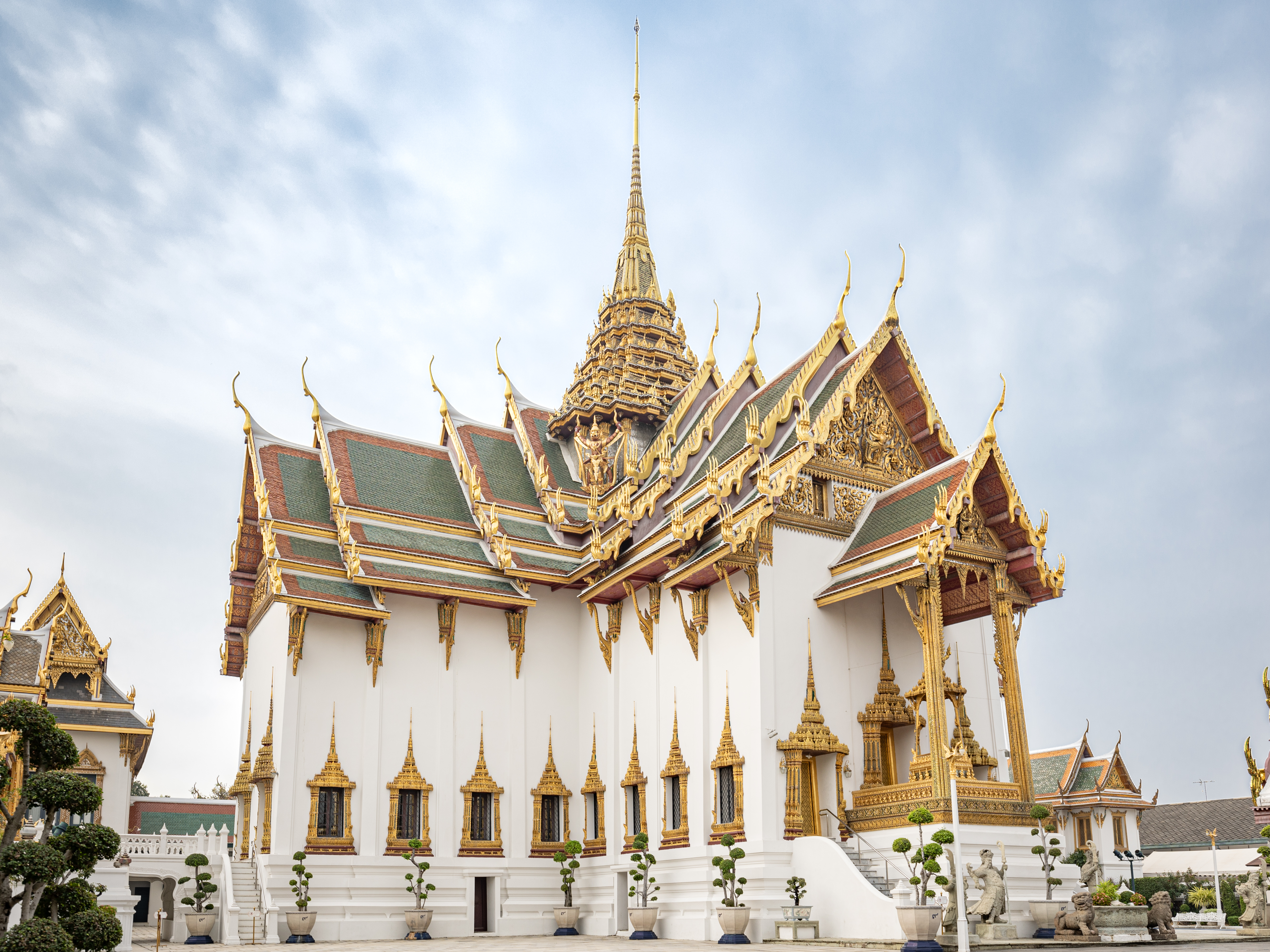
Charles de Montigny the French plenipotentiary to Siam had a grand audience with King Mongkut on 24 July 1856 at Dusit Maha Prasat Throne Hall in Grand Palace

Montigny's procession eventually reached Dusit Maha Prasat Throne Hall, where Pallegoix explained to Montigny that a Mahaprasat was a grand Siamese royal pavilion for state ceremonies with four façades and a spire. Siamese officials brought the portraits of the French Emperor and Empress to place at both flanking sides of the royal throne. Montigny entered the Throne Hall, where Siamese princes, dignitaries, ministers and officials all dressed in white gowns with gold trims and prostrated on the floor with absolute silence and stillness like Egyptian Sphinxes. In the Throne Hall, the veil opened, revealing King Mongkut of Siam, who sat on the throne in his full enthronement attire adorned with gold and jewelry, wearing the Great Crown of Victory and holding the Sword of Victory, under tiered royal umbrella. Montigny was allowed to stand before the king, flanked at his both sides by Collier and Pallegoix. Montigny bowed deeply to King Mongkut three times and read his French letter addressing the Siamese king;

By forging bonds of friendship with His Majesty Napoleon III, Emperor of the French, and commercial and religious relations with his subjects, Your Majesty has demonstrated the noble spirit of a Great Prince. Indeed, you have opened a new era of great prosperity for the Siamese people.

Relations with France have always been beneficial and lasting, as our traditions in this kingdom have proven, and the French nation will come, under the protection of the treaty that I am called upon to negotiate with your ministers, to strengthen with your subjects the relations of sympathy and commerce established for nearly two centuries under the reign of His Majesty Louis XIV.

I must, therefore, congratulate myself personally on having been chosen by my august sovereign to accomplish this great act, and I dare to hope that the negotiators appointed by Your Majesty will understand, as I do, its full future importance and will help me, by all means in their power, to bring it to a useful and happy conclusion.

I must also congratulate myself on this occasion, which has enabled me to see a sovereign whose spirit of progress, brilliant qualities, and personal knowledge have already established his reputation throughout the West.

Montigny then handed the English-translated version for Abbé Larnaudie to read to the king. King Mongkut expressed his joy to Montigny's arrival as the French plenipotentiary to conclude a treaty with Siam, saying that no French envoys had ever come to Siam since the reign of King Narai and he had been waiting for one. Mongkut declared that he would appoint Siamese plenipotentiaries to negotiate the treaty with Montigny. Mongkut inspected the portrait of Emperor Napoleon III, saying that even though the French Emperor did not have a letter for him he still sent his portrait. The veil then closed, signifying the end of royal audience. All the Siamese subjects then arose from their prostrations. After the ceremony, Phrakhlang Kham Bunnag took Montigny on a tour to see Theravadin temples in Bangkok and to see royal white elephants.

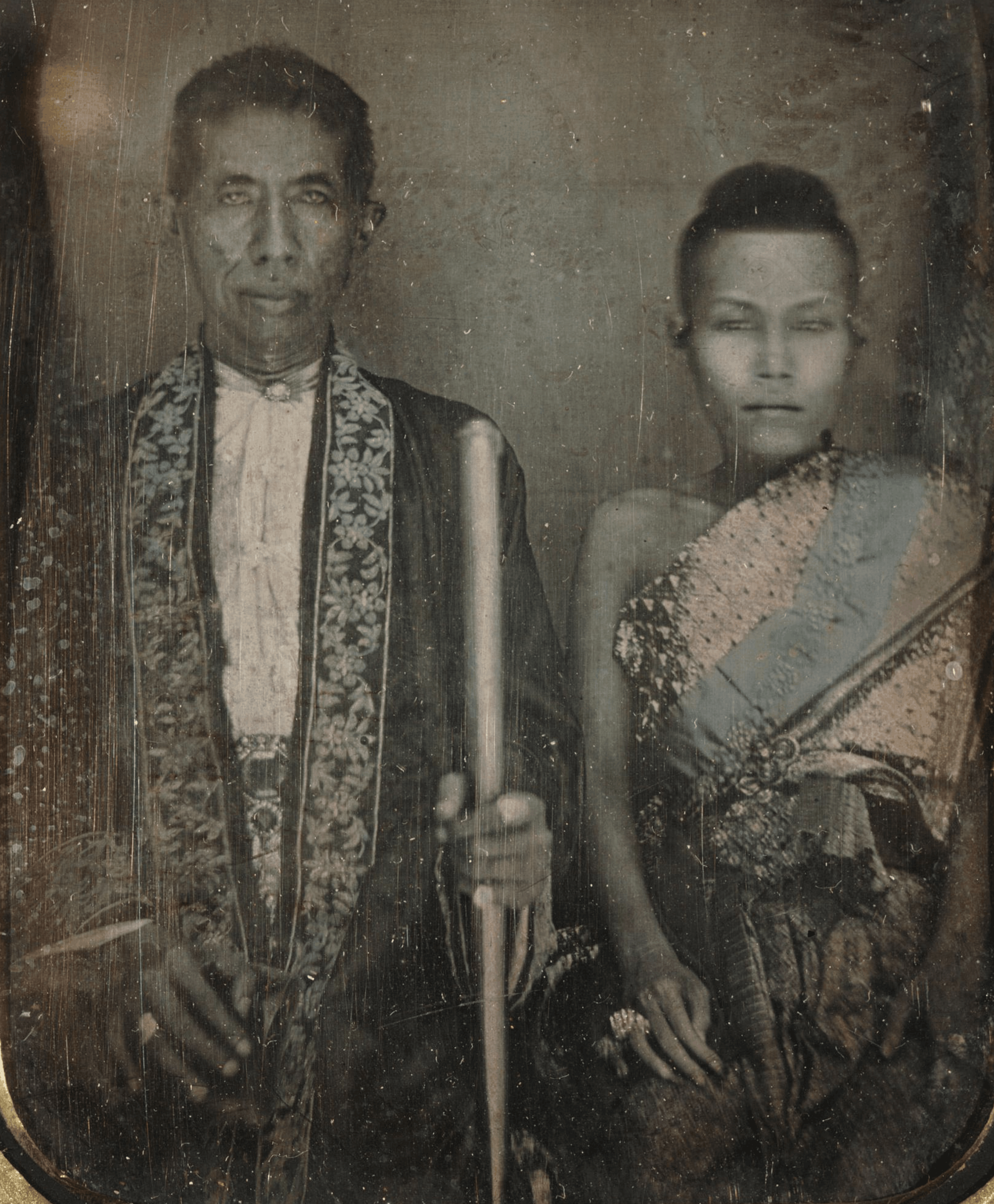
Daguerreotype of King Mongkut and Queen Debsirindra, sent as a gift to President of the United States in 1856, now at Smithsonian Institution

On 29 July 1856, the Siamese female guards escorted the ladies of the mission including Madame de Montigny, Montigny's wife, her two daughters Nina and Blanche and her sister Madame Alliot, to have an audience with King Mongkut in the Inner Palace or women's quarters, where the king's consorts and female royals resided and any males were strictly forbidden to enter, except for the king. As the ladies entered the Inner Palace, they were greeted by King Mongkut and his consort the 22-year-old Queen Debsirindra, both of whom shook hands with the ladies in Western-style and had conversations in English language. Mongkut led Madame Montigny, who took her two daughters in her hands, to tour the women's quarters. King Mongkut noticed that Nina, eldest daughter of Montigny, was a charismatic lady and entrusted her with a golden cigar box, asking Nina to deliver it to her father. After the event, the female guards returned the ladies of the mission to Montigny.

Also on July 29, Montigny and his interpreter Abbé Larnaudie had an audience with Pinklao the Second King of Siam at the Front Palace. The reception ceremony was similar to the one Montigny had experienced with the First King as Montigny was carried in a sedan chair by the Siamese porters to enter the Front Palace. Montigny noticed Vietnamese soldiers dressed in Western military costume. These were the Vietnamese Catholics from An Giang who moved to settle in Samsen in 1834 and entered the service under the Second King. Montigny related that Pinklao, who had allegedly adopted British customs, was even more well-disposed towards Westerners than his elder brother Mongkut.

=== Montigny asking Mongkut about Cambodia and Vietnam ===
In his plan to approach the anti-Christian and anti-Western Vietnamese imperial court, Montigny would invoke support of both Britain and Siam in order to pressure the Vietnamese to the negotiation table. Montigny was to procure an introduction letter written by the Siamese king Mongkut, which would be delivered to Huế in order to facilitate Montigny's arrival. Montigny would also tell the Vietnamese that Sir John Bowring the British envoy would also follow Montigny to arrive in Vietnam. Montigny had earlier asked Bishop Pallegoix to request, on Montigny's behalf, the Siamese king to write such letter. However, Pallegoix refused, saying that it would be inappropriate to ask King Mongkut to write to Vietnam because Siam and Vietnam had waged wars for more than ten years and had long ceased their relations. Montigny was dissatisfied with Pallegoix's refusal and took a negative view on the bishop. The Siamese, however, somehow knew, before Montigny's arrival in Siam, that the French diplomatic mission would also go to Cambodia. Chaophraya Nikonbodin the Prime Minister of Northern Siam then sent Khmer officials from Bangkok to inform King Ang Duong of Cambodia about Montigny's upcoming journey to Cambodia.

Montigny and his two daughters requested an audience with King Mongkut specifically for the matters of Cambodia and Vietnam. Speaking to the king in English, Montigny asked Mongkut to have the Siamese government issue a letter to inform the Vietnamese court of imminent arrival of both Montigny and Sir John Bowring after Montigny's conclusion of the Siamese Treaty. Montigny also asserted that Mongkut's assisting Montigny would be the proof of Siam's sincerity in friendship with France. Mongkut refused, saying that, after the conclusion of the Siamese–Vietnamese War, Siam and Vietnam had not restore relations. Siam saw no benefits of restoring relations with Vietnam and Siam had also been avoiding to initiate because it would be perceived by Vietnam as Siam's yielding and deploring.

Montigny, who knew next to nothing about Siam–Cambodia–Vietnam regional histories, pointed out to Mongkut that in the West, even when nations were in bitter wars and fought relentlessly, they still maintained diplomatic relations. Montigny took the Crimean War as an example, when Russia fought Britain and France but still maintained relations, having Russian ambassadors in both London and Paris.

Montigny then informed Mongkut about his mission in Cambodia. The King of Cambodia had earlier (in 1853) sent gifts including cardamoms, gambodge, etc. to the French government but the Cambodian gifts were lost on the journey (The Cambodian gifts had reached and had been stored in Toulon, where the French government did not care to receive.) so Montigny asked for permission of the Siamese king for him to travel to Cambodia to achieve his mission to explain to the Cambodian king about the gifts. Montigny also asked Mongkut to write a letter to inform the Cambodian king about Montigny's imminent arrival in Kampot. Montigny acknowledged that King of Cambodia was a vassal of Siam but somehow thought that the King of Cambodia could independently pursue relations with France without Siam's approval.

Montigny asked Mongkut whether there were any Khmer language interpreters for him. Mongkut replied that there was a French missionary 'Reverend Doctor Miche' the Bishop of Dansara, who knew both Khmer and Vietnamese languages and could certainly be the interpreter for Montigny. Mongkut told Montigny that Bishop Miche used to spend some time in Bangkok (during Pallegoix's leave to France in 1855) and had once visited the king but Mongkut had to speak with Miche through an interpreter because the bishop did not speak English nor Siamese. Upon hearing that King Ang Duong had earlier pursued relations with France, without Siamese approval, Mongkut speculated that it was Bishop Miche who persuaded Ang Duong to do such thing.

Montigny then asked Mongkut about journey from Kampot to Ang Duong's residence at Oudong. Mongkut told Montigny that the journey from Kampot to Oudong was an arduous one, taking four to five days, having to transverse through thick forests and, during this rainy season, the path would be flooded and muddy. Mongkut suggested that Montigny should try sailing French corvettes to enter from Mekong Delta at Bassac (Sóc Trăng) and Preah Trapeang (Trà Vinh), which had been under Vietnamese control, to take a more-comfortable riparian journey upstream to Phnom Penh, where Montigny would continue to Oudong. Mongkut told Montigny that he should contact Vietnamese authorities in An Giang and Hà Tiên for permission to sail through Southern Vietnam and this would be Montigny's preliminary survey of Vietnamese reaction to Montigny's mission.

Montigny and his daughter Nina disagreed with Mongkut's plan, saying that they were unsure about Vietnam's possible hostilities. Mongkut told Montigny that he had already notified King of Cambodia about upcoming journey of Montigny to Cambodia and the King of Cambodia might send delegates to receive Montigny at Kampot. Montigny asked further whether he could have the Cambodian king write an introduction letter for Montigny to Vietnam. Mongkut replied that he did not know about Cambodia's relations with Vietnam as Cambodia had been paying tributes to both Siam and Vietnam. However, Mongkut strongly asserted that the incumbent king of Cambodia, Harireak Reamea Ang Duong, had closer ties to Siam than to Vietnam;

This Cambodian king is a genuine pro-Thai. In his early youth, he came to live in Bangkok for twenty-nine years. He was a good friend of mine and used to play with me when I was also young. King Nangklao (Rama III) appointed him and allowed him to return as King of Cambodia twelve years ago. He [Nangklao] agreed to allow the Cambodian Oknhas to bring tributes [to Siam] unfailingly every year and to discuss the matters concerning Cambodia on many occasions each year. At the present, three sons of the Cambodian king [Norodom, Sisowath, Sivotha] have also come to stay at the capital Bangkok.

Mongkut also asserted that Siam only allowed Cambodia to pay tributes to Vietnam because the Cambodia was close in proximity to Vietnam and it would keep Cambodia in peace and happiness, not suffering from Vietnamese invasions. In his speech, Mongkut demonstrated to Montigny the French envoy that Siam had been the suzerain of Cambodia. Montigny correctly speculated that Siam was tenacious on holding Cambodia as its vassal state. Montigny did not give up as he presented his draft letter to King Mongkut to write to Vietnam, promising procurement of a minting machine for Siam in exchange, to which Mongkut replied with strong words such as "There is no willing of Siamese government to have communication with the government of Anam or Cochin China who are our opposed enemy. We are happy without intercourse with the country." "The Cochin Chinese nation is our enemy with whom we do not wish to have connection in Friendship again for we are enjoyment of good and better happiness than when we had been connected in friendship with that country." During Montigny's stay in Bangkok, Prince Wongsa also took the three Cambodian princes Ang Voddey, Sisowath and Sivotha, sons of Ang Duong, to meet Montigny in an audience.

=== Conclusion of Franco–Siamese Montigny Treaty ===
On 29 July 1856, King Mongkut appointed five Siamese plenipotentiaries to conclude a new treaty with Montigny;

1. Prince Kromma Luang Wongsathirat Sanit, younger half-brother of King Mongkut
2. Somdet Chaophraya Phichaiyat That Bunnag, also known as Somdet Chaophraya Ong Noi
3. Chaophraya Si Suriyawong Chuang Bunnag, also known as the Kalahom
4. Chaophraya Rawiwong Kham Bunnag, known as Phrakhlang the Minister of Foreign Affair
5. Chaophraya Yommarat Nuch, the Head of Nakhonban Police

The negotiation commenced on July 30 at Thonburi Palace, which was the residence of Prince Kromma Luang Wongsa. Montigny presented Walewski's treaty draft, which composed of twenty-two articles, to the Siamese commissioners. Montigny had learned from the accounts of Bowring Mission of 1855 that Somdet Ong Noi, who had been controlling Siam's trade duties, opposed the British notion of 'free trade' and any changes on the duties but Bowring managed to reduce Siam's import duties to three percent. Montigny noted that Somdet Ong Noi totally gave up his efforts to retain the old system and took virtually no parts in the negotiations. Only three commissioners; the Prince Wongsa, Kalahom Chuang Bunnag and Phrakhlang Kham Bunnag were active. Montigny observed that Chuang Bunnag, as the leader of the faction demanding to open the country to Western trades, held immense powers and even held sway over the king himself.

Unlike the preceding British and American envoys, Montigny the French envoy did not rush the Siamese commissioners to conclude treaty, for Montigny understood that slowness was the way of the Orient. Montigny contemplated that, if France were to bring Siam, Laos and Cambodia under French protectorate, France should have a clear policy, not to be hindered by the British. The negotiations, however, proceeded quickly as most of the treaty terms were exactly the same as the treaties Siam had concluded with Britain. Montigny essentially capitalized on the works of British envoys Bowring and Parkes in Siam. There were also new clauses introduced from the Sino–French Treaty of Whampoa (1844), which were not present in the Bowring Treaty;

- The French in Siam needed to hire some Siamese as interpreters and boat-rowers. However, ordinary Siamese Phrai commoners had been subjected to periodic corvée service to the government. Article 6 of this treaty then stipulated that any Siamese in French employment in Siam were exempted from such corvée obligations.
- Montigny proposed that French biologists and naturalists should be allowed to explore out of Siam's designated area around Bangkok to explore the inner hinterlands of Siam, Laos and Cambodia, which was granted in Article 7.
- Montigny took Article 29 of the Whampoa Treaty, which stated that if a French ship was pillaged in Chinese waters, the Chinese authorities were bound to strive their best to arrest the perpetrator and retrieve the stolen properties or else responsible Chinese officials would be punished, to add to include any French subjects being robbed on land. Montigny cited the example of a British merchant named Hubertson, who had been robbed in China in 1845 and the Chinese authorities did not compensate for his losses. Article 10 stipulated that if any French subjects were robbed both on land and sea in Siamese territories, the Siamese government would be obliged to arrest the perpetrator and retrieve properties. However, failure to do such thing did not oblige the responsible Siamese to compensate nor to be punished.
- Siam had checked British naval threat to Bangkok in Article 7 of Bowring Treaty, which stipulated that any British warships could only anchor at Paknam Samut Prakarm and could not go upstream to Bangkok without prior permission. If British warships were allowed upstream, they could not go beyond Pong Patchamit. Montigny asserted that French navy signified honor and prowess of the French nation and the passage of French navy should be unrestricted anywhere in the world. The Siamese commissioners bargained to allow only two French warships to go to Bangkok at one time, which Montigny rejected, allowing no restrictions of French navy. The result was a discrepancy between French and Thai language versions of the treaty, in which the French version stated that any French warships were allowed unrestricted access to Bangkok, while the Thai version stated that French warships were allowed to Bangkok only with prior permission.

The Siamese commissioners accepted all the twenty-two articles of the treaty draft on 8 August 1856. On August 9, the Siamese commissioners added two articles, including stipulation that the treaty was to be made in French and Siamese languages, to the treaty, bringing the total number of articles to twenty-four. The commissioners proposed to make an English-language version of the treaty because the Siamese did not know French, which Montigny refused. As King Mongkut had sternly refused to write a letter to Vietnam, Montigny ended up writing the introduction letter by himself. Montigny assigned his letter to Captain Le Lieur, who departed with the Catinat from Siam on August 12 to bring the letter to Huế.

Montigny chose the signing date of the treaty to be on August 15th, which was the Feast Day of Emperor Napoleon I, who was born on August 15th. The signing took place at the Thonburi Palace on 15 August 1856, during which the Siamese at Wichaiprasit Fort fired 21-gun salute to celebrate, which was reciprocated by similar twenty-one cannon shots from the French warship Marceau nearby. The terms of this Franco–Siamese Treaty were similar to the earlier treaties Siam had concluded with Britain and the United States;

- Establishment of French consulate in Bangkok and French extraterritorial jurisdiction over French subjects in Siam, in which French subjects accused of offenses would be judged by the French Consul according to French law rather than native Siamese law and judiciary.
- Stipulation of a general low three-percent rate of import duty on Siam, while the export duties were stipulated individually for each commodities.
- Permission of French subjects to reside and buy lands in Siam in the designated area further than four kilometers from Bangkok but not further than the distance of twenty-four-hour boat journey from Bangkok.
- Freedom of Christian proselytization in Siam, abolishing the Siamese ban on evangelization on native people, which had been in place since 1731.

After the signing of the treaty, the Siamese held a banquet for Montigny at his residence, during which the five Siamese commissioners dined with Montigny, Collier, Godeaux, Bishop Pallegoix, Larnaudie and the rest of the French missionaries. Montigny received a reproach from French Foreign Ministry for his delay in his diplomatic mission to Siam and Vietnam. King Mongkut also wrote a letter to notify King Ang Duong of imminent journey of Montigny to Cambodia, also sending a copy of the Franco–Siamese Montigny Treaty to Ang Duong;

Montigny, the envoy who is able to speak English, and his daughter, both had come many times to the Palace to talk with me without interpreter, and informed me that the French Emperor was aware that Ang Preah Harireak Ream Moha Issathipadei [Ang Duong] has expressed his desire to enter into a relationship with France and has sent presents consisting of local products i.e. gambodge, cardamoms, etc.

=== Journey of Montigny to Ayutthaya and Lopburi ===
After conclusion of the Franco–Siamese Treaty, King Mongkut contemplated sending Siamese diplomatic mission to France in the same manner as in the seventeenth century, also considering sending mission to Britain. Charles Hillier the British Consul in Bangkok became alarmed at the news of prospective Siamese mission to France and abruptly went to see Mongkut, asking the Siamese king about the details of the mission; when would the mission depart, who would be the Siamese envoy, whether the mission would go to Britain or France first. Mongkut was angered by Hillier's discourteous visit and retired into his quarters without giving any answers to the British Consul.

On 20 August 1856, Ernest-Napoléon Godeaux presented French imperial gifts to Mongkut at Sutthaisawan Throne Hall. The gifts included a bronze six-inch caliber cannon, four horse wagons, chandeliers, a folding screen depicting a map of Paris, a folding screen depicting French soldier costume, a chess folding screen, a chessboard, a stereoscope, a colt pistol and a singing bird box. Montigny himself gifted a horse to the Siamese king. Montigny found that the French gifts were inferior to those given to the Siamese king by the British on two occasions. On the same day, Mongkut invited Montigny and his family to go on a tour inside of the Siamese royal palace. Next day, on August 21, Mongkut discussed his plan of sending Siamese diplomatic mission to France, saying that Kosa Pan the Siamese envoy to France in 1686 was his ancestor. Mongkut asked Montigny how would the French escort the Siamese envoy to France. Montigny was shocked as he had not been briefed nor prepared for this question. Montigny could only offer warship Catinat to bring the Siamese envoys to France, proposing that the Catinat would deliver the Siamese to Suez, where the Egyptian Pasha would transport them to Alexandria, where any French warships in the Mediterranean would take them.

Commodore Jules Collier, the naval commander of Montigny's warships, went to explore Ayutthaya on August 23, where he met Phra Samutmuni the Theravadin Buddhist abbot of Wat Mondop Temple in Ayutthaya and then Collier returned to Bangkok. Having received the reproach on his delay, Montigny was keen on leaving Siam for Cambodia and Vietnam as soon as possible, with Collier setting departure date to September 10th. Later, Montigny concluded that the Siamese intentionally delayed his departure in order for them to plan with Phraya Aphaiphubet Nong the Siam-appointed governor of Battambang about how to deal with Montigny's venture in Cambodia. On August 28, King Mongkut asked Montigny to visit Ayutthaya, which was about seventy kilometers upstream north of Bangkok, urging Montigny to meet Phra Samutmuni the Buddhist monk who had traveled to Singapore and Ceylon. Killing time until his departure, Montigny took his family on an excursion to the former royal capital of Siam.

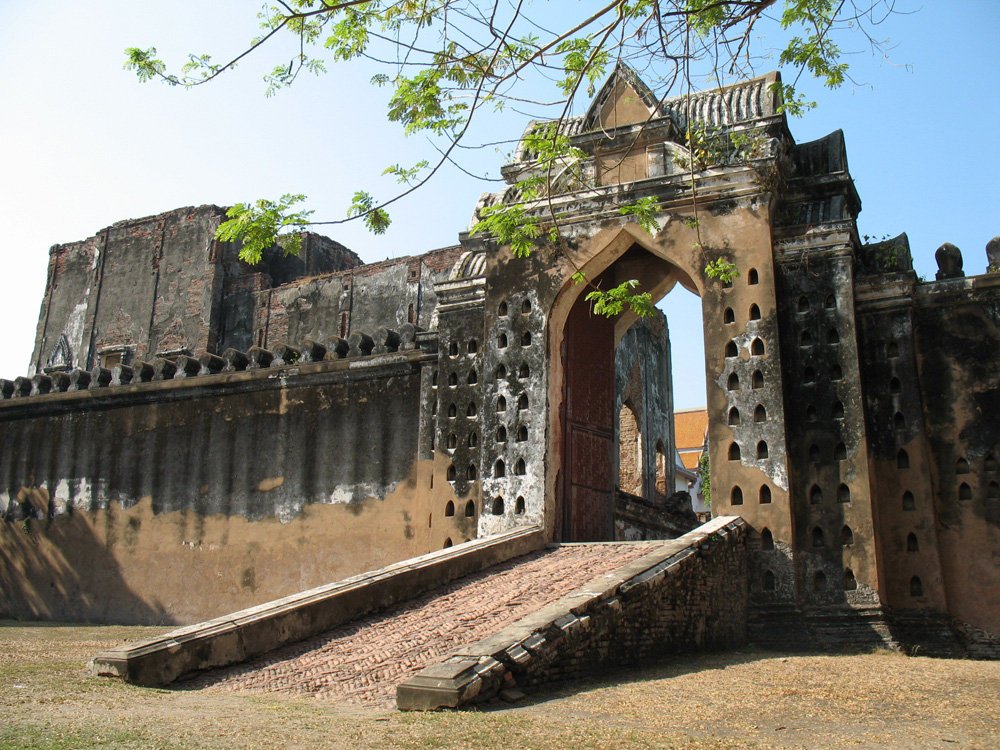
In late August to early September 1856, Charles de Montigny and his family went on an excursion to visit Ayutthaya and Lopburi, visiting King Narai's Palace and former residence of Constantine Phaulkon.

Montigny, along with his family, Godeaux and Abbé Larnaudie, departed from Bangkok on August 30 on a small Siam-owned steamship, going upstream, reaching Ayutthaya on the same day. Montigny was informed that Ayutthaya had the population of 30,000, most of the inhabitants were Siamese or Chinese. Chaophraya Maha Siritham the governor of Ayutthaya (called Chao P'aya Kromma P'ahou by Montigny) and Phra Samutmuni came to greet Montigny. The Siamese took Montigny and his retinue to explore the ruins of Ayutthaya, visiting Wat Phukhaothong Temple and the elephant khedda, circumventing the city moat.

On September 3, Maha Siritham the governor of Ayutthaya sent his son to bring Montigny's retinue to ride on elephant backs to visit Lopburi, which was about fifty kilometers to the northeast of Ayutthaya, visiting King Narai's Palace and former residence of Constantine Phaulkon. Montigny and his family stayed in Lopburi for three days and returned to Ayutthaya on September 6. Next day, on September, Montigny and his family attended a Catholic mass conducted by Larnaudie, who had been the abbot of Saint Joseph Church in Ayutthaya. Montigny wrote a letter to report to Mongkut about his travel to Ayutthaya and Lopburi. In this letter, Montigny addressed Mongkut as "King of Siam, Sovereign of Laos, Suzerain of Cambodia, etc" (French: S. M. le roi de Siam, souverain du Laos, suzerain du Cambodge, etc). Montigny and his family returned to Bangkok on the same day on September 7.

When Montigny returned to Bangkok on September 7, he found that the Siamese had not finished preparing the royal letter and gifts for Emperor Napoleon III. As the departure was scheduled to be on September 10, Commodore Collier threatened that if Montigny did not depart on that day he was obliged to bring the Capricieuse to join Captain Le Lieur in Vietnam or join Rear Admiral Guérin in Macau. Montigny could do nothing but to plead Collier to stay. Montigny was thus stalled in Siam and did not manage to depart on September 10. On September 11, King Mongkut announced the Siamese gifts for the French Emperor and held another banquet for Montigny. To demonstrate his desire to leave Siam, Montigny and his family left the banquet early.

Next day, on September 12, Montigny the French plenipotentiary appointed António Frederico Moor the Portuguese Consul in Bangkok, who had been in Siam for twelve years, as the acting French Consul in Siam. Even though France and Portugal used to compete for jurisdiction over Catholic Mission in the Far East, they cooperated as fellow Catholic nations. Montigny explained that there had been an agreement, in which French Consul would be responsible for Portuguese subjects and Portuguese Consul would be responsible for French subjects where either France or Portugal did not have representatives. Montigny's appointment of António Frederico Moor as acting French Consul in Bangkok displeased the Siamese, who had been expecting France to send a dignitary as Consul to Siam, like the British had done. France, however, was short of diplomatic personnel in the Far East and Montigny himself was soon to return to his consular position in Shanghai. The Siamese saw Moor's appointment as France not caring about Siam.

=== Siamese proposals to Montigny about Phú Quốc ===
Commodore Jules Collier set the new departure date to be on September 21 and continued to pressure Montigny about the delay of his departure from Siam. Collier argued that they had earlier scheduled to reach Danang on September 21, to which Montigny denied. Montigny deplored King Mongkut to hasten the procedures, to which the Prince Kromma Luang Wongsa replied that the Siamese could not finish before September 19. Prince Wongsathirat Sanit asked Collier to take nine Khmer men, who were said to have accompanied the Cambodian princes to Siam, on board the Capricieuse to return them to Cambodia.

During the last week of Montigny's stay in Bangkok, Chaophraya Si Suriyawong Chuang Bunnag requested a confidential meeting with Montigny. In the meeting, Chuang Bunnag the Kalahom rolled out a map depicting the coasts of Gulf of Siam, Cambodia and Southern Vietnam. Chuang Bunnag pointed to the Phú Quốc Island on the map, which faces the Cambodian seaport town of Kampot, which was called Koh Dot Island by the Siamese. Chuang Bunnag told Montigny that the Phú Quốc or Koh Dot Island had beautiful pristine beaches with freshwater sources and arable land for cultivation. Chuang Bunnag had earlier visited the island himself when he led the Siamese navy to attack Hà Tiên during the Siamese–Vietnamese War in 1842. Chuang Bunnag proposed that France should take control of this island as the island situated perfectly on the trade route between China and India, its location very strategic. Chuang Bunnag suggested that France could make Phú Quốc into the French commercial entrepôt of the Far East.

Listening to the Siamese Kalahom flattering on the Phú Quốc Island, Montigny assumed that France conquering Phú Quốc was the desire of the Siamese king Mongkut, who had told Montigny several times that he wished France to be a neighbor of Siam. Montigny replied to this bizarre Siamese proposal that he had not been empowered to receive any territorial concessions and could only relay to the French imperial government. Montigny asked Chuang Bunnag whether the Phú Quốc or Koh Dot Island belonged to Siam. Bunnag denied, saying that the island did not belong to Siam as it used to belong to Cambodia but the Vietnamese had taken possession of it. Montigny laughed at Bunnag's answer, asking why should the Siamese give an island that was not theirs to France. Montigny suggested that if Siam was so eager to have France as its neighbor, Siam should give one of its own islands to France. Chuang Bunnag briskly replied that if Siam had any islands so strategic as Koh Dot it would give to France but there were no other islands as valuable as Phú Quốc. Next day, Prince Wongsa and Phrakhlang Kham Bunnag also talked to Montigny about France taking control of Phú Quốc.

It is not known why the Siamese wanted France to take control of Phú Quốc. Perhaps the Siamese intended to test whether France had territorial ambitions or Siam simply utilized France to reduce the influences of Vietnam in the region.

=== Departing Ceremonies ===
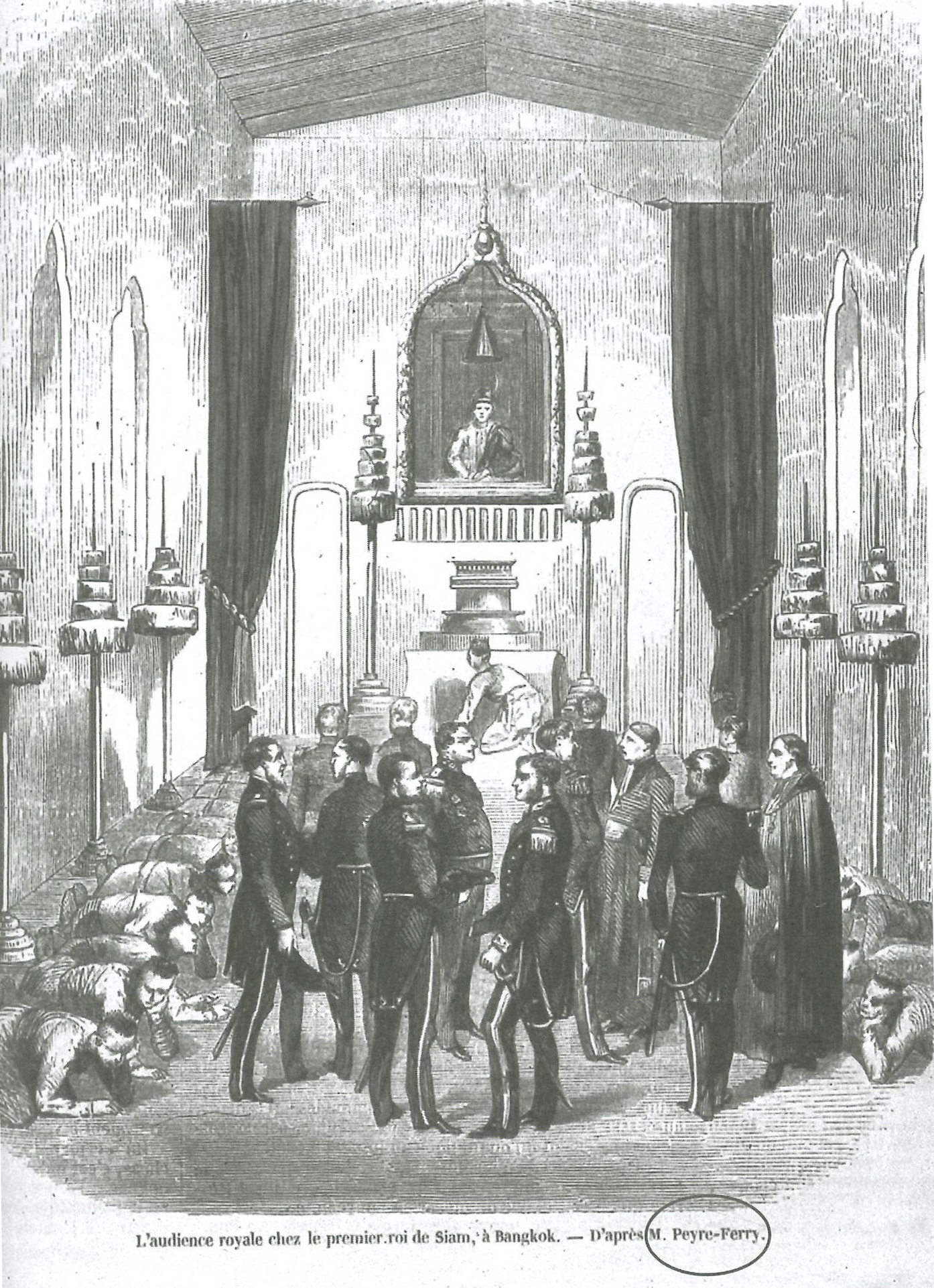
Depiction of audience of Charles de Montigny with King Mongkut, published on L'Illustration in 1857

As Montigny bid farewell to the Siamese ministers, the grand ceremony of King Mongkut entrusting his letter to Montigny took place on 19 September 1856, The royal letter was written in Siamese language in Siamese alphabets engraved on a gold plate, accompanied by an English translation written by King Mongkut himself and another English letter written by Pinklao the Second King. The same riparian royal barges procession came to receive Montigny from his residence, who took the royal barge to the palace, where Montigny rode the sedan chair carried on shoulders of Siamese porters to enter. Montigny entered the Sutthaisawan Throne Hall. King Mongkut sat on the throne with Siamese dignitaries and officials prostrating on the floor. Mongkut took Montigny to Sihabanchon windowed balcony overlooking the courtyard.

Mongkut then presented Siamese gifts for the French Emperor to Montigny including the golden royal letter enclosed in a gold-enameled case, a daguerreotype of Mongkut and his queen Debsirindra (taken by Larnaudie, who had also been a photographer), two rings for Emperor Napoleon and Empress Eugénie each, six golden inkwells and nibs, golden betel bowl set and pipe, a Siamese sword with golden hilt, a golden scissor and a Malay kris as Siamese officials knelt down to receive each of them. The Second King also sent gifts to the French Emperor. Montigny had requested exotic animals from Siam to display in France, to which Mongkut granted a male and a female elephants, a tapir, a gaur, a serow, a gibbon, a peacock, etc. These animals, however, could not be immediately transported to France and had to wait for another French ship to arrive to fetch them. Montigny also had Chaophraya Si Suriyawong Chuang Bunnag the Kalahom Siamese Minister of War write a letter to the French Minister of War Marshal of France Jean-Baptiste Philibert Vaillant.

== French Bombardment of Danang (1856) ==
=== Arrival of Le Lieur in Danang ===
Apart from concluding a treaty with Siam, Count Colonna-Walewski the French Foreign Minister had also assigned Charles de Montigny the French plenipotentiary, who had been in Siam since July 1856, to conclude a commercial treaty with the Vietnamese Nguyen-dynasty imperial court in similar manner to Siam, also to remonstrate Vietnam's persecutions of Christians. Montigny's plan of approach on Vietnam was to invoke British and Siamese supports by having the King of Siam write a letter introducing Montigny to Vietnam to facilitate his entry and Montigny would tell the Vietnamese that Sir John Bowring the British envoy would soon follow Montigny to Vietnam, pressuring the Vietnamese to negotiate. However, this plan of Montigny was jeopardized when the Siamese king Mongkut sternly refused to write any letters to Vietnam, for Siam and Vietnam had been bitter enemies since the Siamese–Vietnamese Wars. This left Montigny with no choices but to write the letter himself in French language and assigned Father Charles Fontaine, a French MEP missionary, to bring Montigny's introduction letter to Huế. Capitaine de frégate Le Lieur de Ville-sur-Arce took Father Fontaine on his corvette Catinat to Vietnam, departing from Samut Prakarn on 12 August 1856.

Montigny speculated that the Vietnamese would not peacefully accept his letter so he provided instructions to Abbé Fontaine that, upon arrival in Danang, Fontaine should deliver Montigny's letter to the highest authority he could find. If the Vietnamese officials in Danang refused to accept the letter, Le Lieur should take Fontaine on the Catinat to peacefully enter the Perfume River to deliver the letter directly to Huế without provoking any confrontations. If the Vietnamese at Huế refused to accept the letter, Fontaine was to read Montigny's letter aloud in Vietnamese language for Vietnamese people to hear and then place the letter in an appropriate place.

Le Lieur took Abbé Fontaine and the Catinat back to Singapore in order to resupply coal and other provisions, reaching Singapore on August 18. After spending half a month in Singapore, Le Lieur left Singapore on 6 September 1856 (the same day that Montigny returned from Lopburi to Ayutthaya) with his warship Catinat and Father Fontaine, riding on the southwestern monsoon winds, going to the northeast to reach Danang on 16 September 1856, anchoring at Sơn Trà promontary in front of Danang city. Emperor Minh Mạng had earlier decreed that any Western ships coming to contact or trade with Vietnam should only do so in Danang. Le Lieur's arrival in Danang with the Catinat in September 1856 was the first French arrival since Lapierre's bombardment of Danang in 1847, nine years prior. Le Lieur also noticed that Danang was fortified in the aftermath of the 1847 French attack.

Some Vietnamese officials from Danang visited Le Lieur on the Catinat. The Vietnamese asked Le Lieur whether he would salute Vietnam with cannon shots. Le Lieur replied that the Vietnamese had not hoisted their flags even though Le Lieur had hoisted his French flag, which was considered inappropriate by Western diplomatic protocols and Le Lieur would not salute until the Vietnamese raised their flags. Le Lieur told the Vietnamese officials that he had brought a letter from the French imperial envoy Montigny to present to the Vietnamese Emperor, to which the Vietnamese replied that they had to inform the Tổng đốc Nam Nghĩa or governor of Quảng Nam and Quảng Ngãi provinces first, whose residence in Điện Bàn took two days to communicate. The Vietnamese told Le Lieur to wait for at least four days and Le Lieur could not enter Danang until then. Le Lieur knew that this was a usual Vietnamese deploy to chase off Western visitors. The visiting Vietnamese officials then left and did not hoist their flags so Le Lieur did not salute the Vietnamese flags.

=== Le Lieur's delivery of Montigny's letter at Thuận An ===
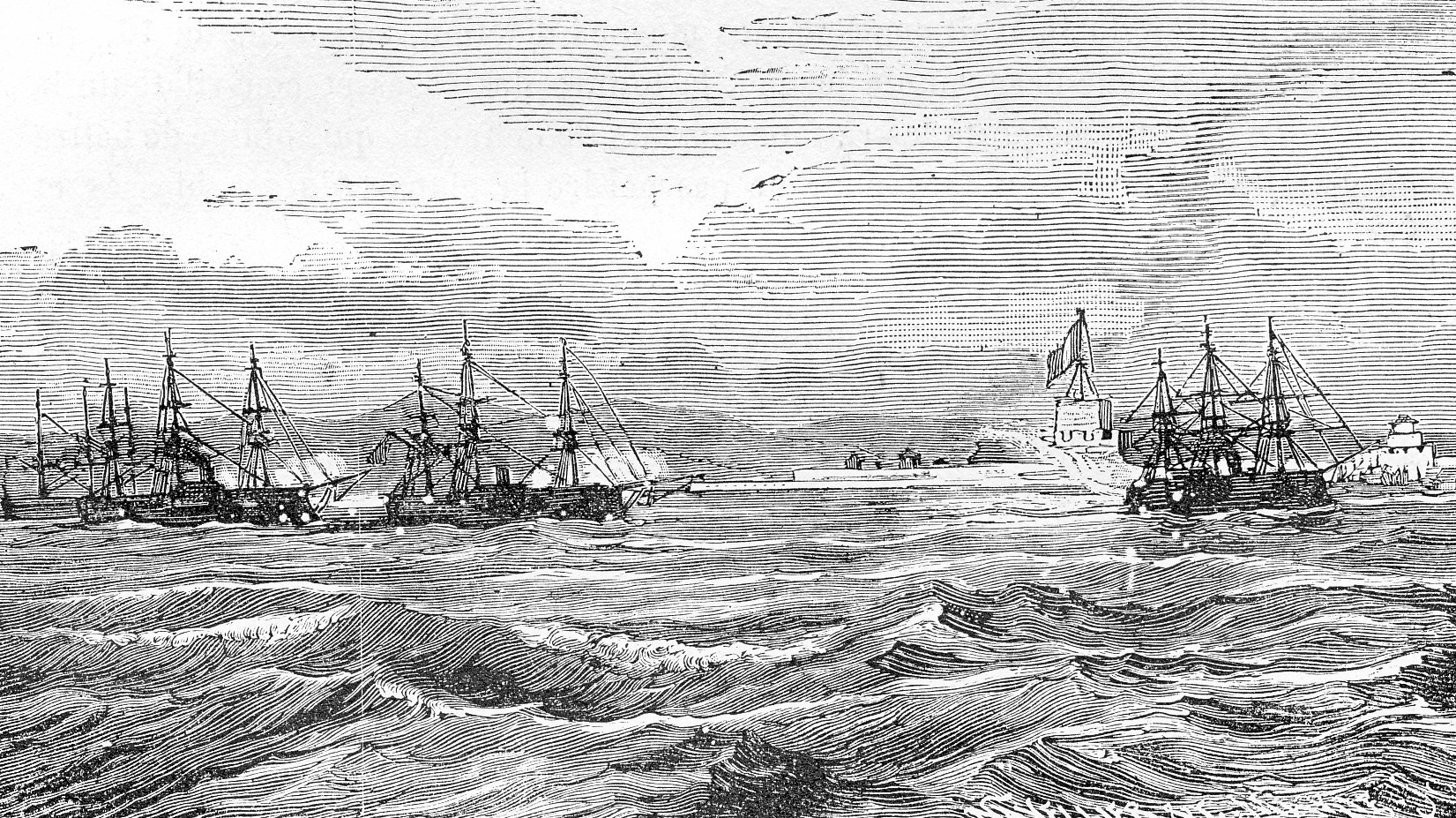
Depiction of Battle at Thuận An, which guarded the mouth of Perfume River, the entrance to Huế Imperial City, in 1883

Le Lieur and Fontaine waited at Sơn Trà for three days and decided to go to Huế. On 19 September 1856, which was the same day as the ceremony of Mongkut entrusting royal letter to Montigny in Bangkok, Le Lieur decided to bring the Catinat to Huế but he was blocked at the mouth of the Perfume River by the Thuận An Fort that had been guarding the entrance to Huế. Le Lieur had disarmed his warship in order not to provoke Vietnamese military responses. The Vietnamese populace in Thuận An panicked anyway in commotion upon arrival of the Catinat and Vietnamese officials tried in vain to chase away the French warship. Fontaine disembarked from the Catinat and go to talk to the Vietnamese mandarins in Vietnamese language, explaining that the French came in peace and presented Montigny's letter to the Vietnamese;

I have the honor to officially notify you, so that without delay you may inform His Majesty your Sovereign and his Government, that my powerful master, the Emperor of France, had deigned to be with me, and entrusted me with his full powers and ordered me to go to the Court of Hue, to negotiate a treaty of friendship, commerce, navigation and religion.

Forgetting the justified grievances of the French Empire against the Annamite Government, His Imperial Majesty, still willing, in the interest of sympathy and humanity for the Cochinchinese people, to attempt his last step of peace and conciliation, but he has ordered me to declare to your Government that this will be the last that His Majesty your Sovereign and his ministers will remain solely responsible for the consequences of a further refusal to loyally renew the old treaties of frienship that united under Louis XVI, Cochinchina with France, and which were so powerfully useful to one of the predecessors of the reigning king, in reconquering his States.

In his letter to the Vietnamese court, Montigny also threatened that, if his letter failed to reach the Vietnamese Emperor, he would demand punishments of responsible Vietnamese officials;

I must declare to Your Excellency that if this notification does not reach the King, your master, who will, moreover, receive a copy, my first action and that of my colleague, the Plenipotentiary of England, will be to demand the trial of the Ministers whose culpable conduct in such a grave circumstance could lead to the most unfortunate consequences and bring great misfortunes upon Cochinchina.

Vietnamese officials at Thuận An Fort preliminarily sent Montigny's letter to the Vietnamese Emperor Tự Đức at Huế. Le Lieur also wrote his own letter to accompany Montigny's letter to Huế, demanding the Vietnamese to treat him with friendship until arrival of the plenipotentiary. The Vietnamese promised to bring a ship to fetch Montigny to Huế. However, the Viện cơ mật or Vietnamese privy council rejected these letters on the grounds that the French approach was not appropriate. Next day, on September 20, the two rejected letters of Montigny and Le Lieur were returned to Thuận An as the Vietnamese refused to take these letters. A Vietnamese official threw the letters into a small boat. Father Fontaine took Montigny's letter from the boat and laid it on the beach, where it was left as it was. Fontaine then boarded the Catinat and Le Lieur took them back to Danang on the same day.

At Danang, the Vietnamese officials came to inform Le Lieur that, according to Vietnamese law, Western ships were not allowed to visit Vietnam under any pretext and ask Le Lieur whether he managed to deliver the letter at Huế, to which Le Lieur angrily replied that he had left the letter at the place and he would wait for six days for arrival of Montigny. If Vietnam did not response, the allied Western nations of France and Britain would attack Vietnam. Next day, on September 21 (the day of departure of Montigny from Siam), four young Vietnamese mandarins came to visit Le Lieur on the Catinat. Le Lieur told them with anger that Vietnam had earlier resisted French diplomatic advances, resulting in the bombardment of Danang in 1847 and, this time, the same thing was going to happen again. Le Lieur threatened to bombard Danang with his warship Catinat.

Upon learning of the approach of French warship Catinat on Danang and Huế and threats of the French naval commander Le Lieur, the Vietnamese Emperor Tự Đức was reportedly furious, declaring that any Vietnamese officials who dare to receive the French diplomatic letter would be considered traitors and would be subjected to death penalties. Some Vietnamese officials petitioned the Emperor to accept French diplomatic gesture and conclude a treaty with France but Trương Đăng Quế (called "The old Long-koué" by the French) the Chief Minister of Vietnam insisted that Vietnam should adhere to isolationist policies and should enforce Christian persecutions even more. Trương Đăng Quế the Vietnamese Prime Minister, concurrently the Minister of War, commanded Trần Tri the Tổng đốc Nam Nghĩa governing Quảng Nam and Quảng Ngãi provinces to garrison more troops in Danang in defense against incoming French attack. Trần Tri was given order to strike first when the French warship came near.

=== Le Lieur's bombardment of Danang ===
On 24 September 1856, Abbé Fontaine came down from the Catinat to ask the Vietnamese at Danang whether the two letters of Montigny and Le Lieur had reached the Vietnamese Emperor and demanded the reply to those letters. The Vietnamese returned the two letters, which were untouched and unopened, to Fontaine. Captain Le Lieur considered the Vietnamese refusing to accept and open French diplomatic letters a serious breach of Western protocols and an insult to the French nation. Le Lieur then decided to go to war with Vietnam, without consulting his superior Collier, who was then heading to Chanthaburi in Eastern Siam, nor consulting the French government. Father Fontaine also urged Le Lieur that only military action could compel Vietnam to yield to French proposals.

French Bombardment of Danang (1856)
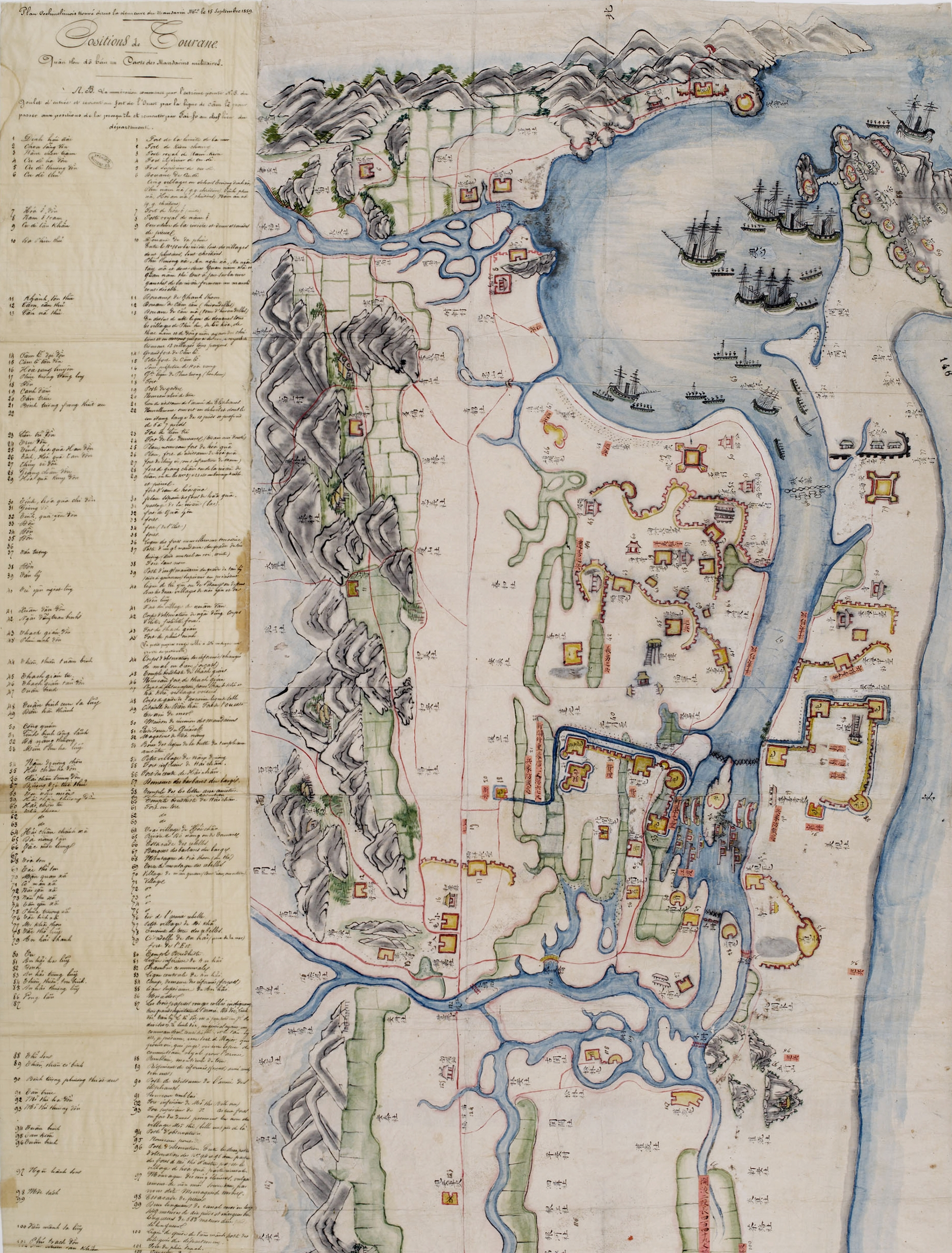
- Map of Danang taken by the French during French attack on Danang in 1858. Sơn Trà promontary is on the upper right corner of the map and the Hàn River runs vertically.
Date	25–26 September 1856
Location	Danang, Sơn Trà

Belligerents
Second French Empire (France)	Nguyễn dynasty (Vietnam)

Commanders and leaders
(Second French Empire) Le Lieur de Ville-sur-Arce (Second French Empire) Bouet (Second French Empire) Passemard (Second French Empire) Bérard (Second French Empire) Artiguenave	Trần Tri; Hoàng Thành; Tôn Thất Dũng; Phạm Thuật

Strength
French marines on Catinat; 53 men	Vietnamese forces in Danang unknown Vietnamese forces in Sơn Trà; 300 men

On 25 September 1856, capitaine de frégate Le Lieur brought French steam corvette Catinat to bombard and destroy three forts of the Sơn Trà peninsula in front of Danang bay including a small fort with three cannons, a medium fort with five cannons and a large fort. This was just a preliminary assault. Le Lieur noticed that the Vietnamese, in response to his attack on Sơn Trà, reinforced. Le Lieur also noticed two new Vietnamese mandarins, who were higher-ranking than those he had encountered. These were Tôn Thất Dũng and Phạm Thuật, who were responsible for the defense of Sơn Trà.

Contemplating more French attacks, the Vietnamese in Danang were busy taking their defensive positions. Le Lieur observed intensive mobilization in Danang and on the Hàn River. Le Lieur decided that he should attack first in an pre-emptive strike before the Vietnamese could establish a strong defensive ground against him. On 26 September 1856, Le Lieur had lunch with his French marine soldiers on the Catinat and then proceeded to attack Danang. The Catinat entered the Hàn River and the Danang citadel responded with cannon fires. This French attack on Danang was different from the previous occasions, when the French remained in their warship but this time the French also made an amphibious landing. Le Lieur sent fifty-three French marines under Bouet to land on Danang, destroying Vietnamese forts and cannons. According to French source, the Vietnamese in those forts simply retreated.

Facing superior French military technology, the Vietnamese in Danang shifted to guerilla warfare. Vietnamese gunmen rushed to hide themselves in rocks and bushes to fire their rifles on the French. Le Lieur called this tactic "War of Rocks and Bushes" (Guerre de rochers et de buissons). The Catinat fired cannons on the Vietnamese ambushing gunmen, inflicting heavy casaulties on the Vietnamese. The main Danang fort also intensely fired successive shots on the Catinat. As the battle became intense, Le Lieur decided to retreat as he could not deal with these Vietnamese guerilla tactics, recalling all the French marines on the Vietnamese soil back on the Catinat.

Retreat of the Catinat from Hàn River was not a genuine victory for the Vietnamese, however. Le Lieur brought the Catinat to attack the Sơn Trà Forts. There were three hundred Vietnamese defenders in Sơn Trà. Bouet bombarded the main Sơn Trà Fort with a mountain howitzer, destroying the gate as the French seized and occupied Sơn Trà. The French captured forty Vietnamese soldiers in Sơn Trà, while the rest fled into the Sơn Trà Mountain. Le Lieur send French infantry to gun down the Vietnamese retreating into Danang, inflicting more casualties. At the end of the battle, the French had destroyed sixty Vietnamese bronze cannons and neutralized a large amount of Vietnamese gunpower by pouring water on them. A large portion of Vietnamese fortifications in Danang and Sơn Trà were also crumbled. Through the battle, not a single French soldier died.

It turned out that violence softened the Vietnamese, who became open for negotiations. Next day, on September 27, Trần Tri the Prefect of the Province came to meet Le Lieur on the Catinat at Sơn Trà, telling Le Lieur that the Vietnamese imperial court would make peace and send four delegates to conclude the treaty. Le Lieur was unsure whether his attack on Danang was legitimate as he had not sought approval from his superiors beforehand. Le Lieur told the Vietnamese official that his name was Lê Liệu and refused to negotiate, saying that he had no authority and they should wait for the arrival of Montigny the true French plenipotentiary, who should arrive anytime soon. For the Vietnamese damages inflicted during the battle, the French might compensate after conclusion of the treaty. Trần Tri then opened the letters of Montigny and Le Lieur and sent them to Huế imperial court.

The Vietnamese Emperor Tự Đức was enraged at the Vietnamese losses and casualties, wondering how could one single French warship inflict such damages. Refusing to believe in Western military superiority, Tự Đức put the blame on local officials and defenders. Trần Tri, whom Tự Đức accused of being idle and doing nothing during the French attack, was stripped of his position as Tổng đốc Nam Nghĩa and was put on a judiciary trial of Minister of Justice for his incompetence and negligence. Tôn Thất Dũng and Phạm Thuật, the defenders of Sơn Trà, also suffered similar punishments. Trần Hoằng replaced Trần Tri as the new Tổng đốc Nam Nghĩa. Tự Đức also sent Đào Trí to bring forces from Huế to guard the Trấn Hải or Thuận An Forts at the mouth of the Perfume River leading to Huế.

== Montigny Mission in Cambodia ==
=== Journey of Montigny from Bangkok to Kampot ===
Apart from diplomatic missions in Siam and Vietnam, Count Walewski the French Foreign Minister had also assigned Charles de Montigny to go to Cambodia. Earlier, in 1853, King Harireak Reamea Ang Duong of Cambodia contacted Frédéric Gauthier the French Consul at Singapore, through Bishop Jean-Claude Miche the Apostolic Vicar of Cambodia, in efforts to establish Franco–Cambodian relations. King Ang Duong had sent Cambodian products including ivory, rhinoceros horns, gambodge, sugar and pepper to Singapore, carried by Catholic Cambodian–Portuguese Mestizo officials, asking Gauthier to forward those gifts to the French government at Paris. These gifts had reached Toulon in Southern France but the French government somehow could not find these gifts and considered them lost. Montigny was then assigned to inform the Cambodian king that his gifts to France had been lost.

When Montigny was in Singapore, in June 1856, Father Jean-Marie Beurel the procurator of Paris Foreign Missions Society at Singapore sent a notification to Bishop Jean-Claude Miche in Cambodia, informing Bishop Miche that Montigny the French plenipotentiary had arrived in Singapore, who would go to Cambodia after finishing his mission in Siam. Montigny requested that Bishop Miche bring the Cambodian king Ang Duong to the Cambodian seaport of Kampot, where Montigny would meet with the Cambodian king. Montigny also asked Bishop Miche to be his interpreter in Cambodia. When Montigny was in Siam, Bishop Miche asked Ang Duong what he would do when Montigny arrived. Ang Duong replied that Miche could do whatever he wanted because his kingdom was too insignificant for France to take notice. Bishop Miche asserted that Ang Duong had been desiring to establish relations with France, even though he did not say it openly and Bishop Miche would see it through for the Cambodian king.

Bishop Jean-Claude Miche had come to wait for Montigny at Kampot since July 1856. Miche wrote to his colleague Pallegoix in Bangkok, asking Pallegoix to inform Montigny that there were no Western-style houses appropriate for his rank in Cambodia as all of the Cambodian houses are wooden houses with thatched roof. In rainy season, the roads were flooded and became muddy. The Sala or visitor retreats were open-air. There was an abandoned storehouse of the British merchant Evans in Kampot that Montigny could reside but the roof leaked rainwater. Montigny would only be able to stay in his own warship to live comfortably in Cambodia. Miche also asked Montigny to procure 'freedom of religion' for Christians in Cambodia. Even though Ang Duong was friendly towards Christians, the Cambodian king had been forcing the Catholics to attend 'superstitious' Buddhist ceremonies. Phraya Aphaiphubet Nong the Siam-appointed governor of Battambang had forced Catholic cannoneers to fire gun salute in a funeral of a Buddhist monk.

After the ceremony of entrusting King Mongkut's royal letter and Siamese gifts for Emperor Napoleon III to Montigny on 19 September 1856 (the day that Le Lieur delivered Montigny's letter at Thuận An), Montigny left Bangkok on next day on September 20. Montigny arrived at the river bar of Chaophraya River on July 9, arriving in Bangkok on July 14, having a grand audience with Mongkut at Siamese royal palace on July 24 and signing the Franco–Siamese Treaty on August 15, spending nearly two months in Siam. Prince Wongsathirat Sanit asked Commodore Jules Collier to take nine Cambodian men from Bangkok to return them to Cambodia, also reminding Montigny that France should take control of the Vietnamese island of Phú Quốc.

Montigny, his family and his retinue, including Collier, eventually left Bangkok on 20 September 1856, reaching Paknam Samut Prakarn at the mouth of Chaophraya River on the same day. Phraya Samut Buranurak the Siamese governor of Samut Prakarn let Montigny stay in his own house because there were no honorable accommodations for Montigny there. On 21 September 1856, in accordance with Collier's schedule, Collier took his sailing corvette Capricieuse to cross the river bar to leave Siam. Lieutenant De la Motte took the steam corvette Marceau, where Montigny, his family and his assistant Ernest-Napoléon Godeaux resided, to follow the Capricieuse, crossing the river bar into the Gulf of Siam. Father Louis Larnaudie, who had been serving as Montigny's interpreter in Siam, also accompanied Montigny to Chanthaburi.

As both the Marceau and the Capricieuse had left Siam, Mongkut wrote another letter to Montigny, informing Montigny that he had notified the King of Cambodia about Montigny's arrival in Cambodia and the 'Reverend Doctor Miche' would be his interpreter. French warships Marceau and Capricieuse arrived at Chula Island at Laem Sing Cape at the mouth of Chanthaburi River on September 25 (First day of Le Lieur's bombardment of Danang). The French warships, however, were too large to proceed upstream the river. Next day, on September 26 (Second day of Le Lieur's bombardment of Danang), Collier came down to negotiate with the Siamese at the fort at the mouth of Chanthaburi River. On September 27, Montigny and his family, along with Abbé Larnaudie and De la Motte, descended from the Marceau to the fort, where they were greeted by Phraya Witchayathibodi the Chanthaburi governor.

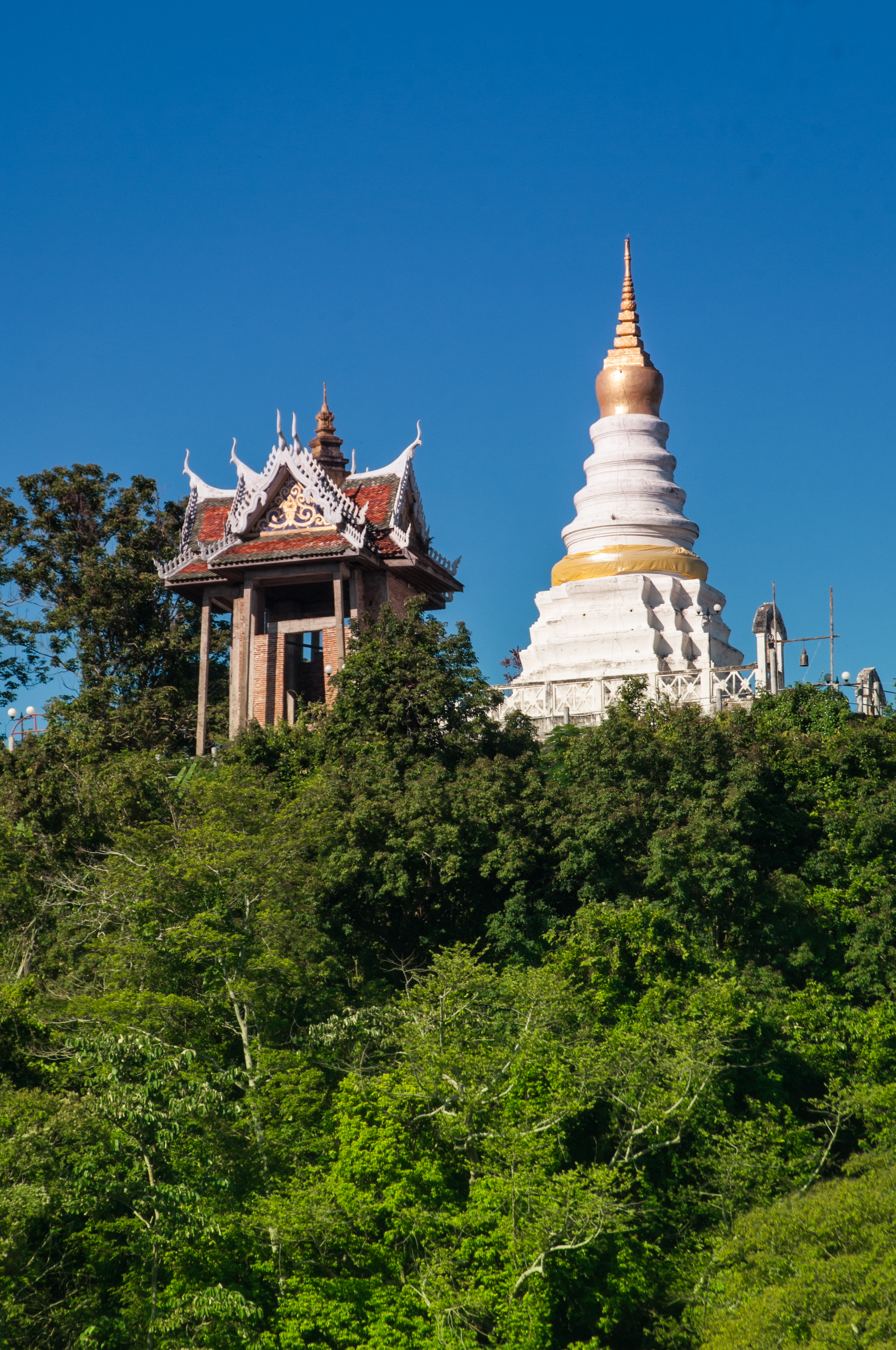
Charles de Montigny visited Khao Phloywaen or Mountain of Precious Gemstones, to the west of modern Chanthaburi town, in September 1856.

Witchayathibodi had small vessels transport Montigny's entourage upstream the river to Chanthaburi town. The journey took five hours along the two-league riparian path. The French Mission visited Khao Phloywaen Mountain, translated as the Mountain of Precious Gemstones, which was about eight kilometers to the west of the town, where gemstones were mined. The French returned to their warships at the mouth of Chanthaburi river.

Next day, on September 28, Commodore Collier took his warship Capricieuse to leave Chanthaburi for Kampot in order to pre-arrange Montingy's arrival. Montigny and his family took an excursion to Chanthaburi, noting that Chanthaburi had to population of 6,000, composing of the Siamese, the Vietnamese and the Chinese. The Vietnamese Catholics in Chanthaburi had been under supervision of a French MEP priest Jean-Baptiste Ranfaing, who had been preaching in Chanthaburi since 1839. On September 29, Montigny rode a sedan chair to visit Abbé Ranfaing at the Church of Immaculate Conception, which was, by that time, still a wooden building with thatched roof. Ranfaing greeted Montigny with salute cannon shots and bell-ringing.

On 30 September 1856, at the mouth of Chanthaburi River, Montigny bid farewell to the Siamese, including Father Larnaudie, who had been his interpreter since his arrival in Siam. Lieutenant De la Motte took Montigny and his family on the Marceau to leave Chanthaburi on September 30, departing from Siamese territories and entering the Cambodian territories.

=== Montigny's expulsion of Siamese spy from Kampot ===
Earlier, Alphonse de Bourboulon the French Minister in China took leave to return to France in 1854, leaving his 28-year-old apprentice René de Courcy to act in his stead. Bourboulon also assigned De Courcy as the French delegate to Siam but his plan was sabotaged by appointment of Charles de Montigny the French Consul at Shanghai as the French plenipotentiary to Siam. It turned out that, with absences of both Bourboulon and Montigny, De Courcy at Macau presided over a crucial period of history of the French in China. Auguste Chapdelaine, a French MEP missionary, went to preach in Xilin, Guangxi Province but ended up executed by local Chinese authorities in February 1856, known as the Chapdelaine Incident. The news of the incident reached Macau in July 1856 and De Courcy protested to Ye Mingchen the Viceroy of Liangguang that the Emperor's Christian toleration edict and the Treaty of Whampoa had been violated and demanded reparations, to which Ye Mingchen countered that French missionaries had not been allowed to venture inland in the first place, only allowed to stay at the treaty ports.

Commodore Jules Collier arrived in the Cambodian seaport town of Kampot on October 4th with his corvette Capricieuse, one day before Montigny, arriving with the nine Cambodians that the Siamese prince Wongsathirat Sanit had asked Collier to take them to return to their home country of Cambodia. However, among these nine Khmer men were three Siamese officials. Their titles are given in the Cambodian chronicles as Phra Ratchathani, Phra Thepphakdi and Phra Phakdinikorn, with two of them going to deliver Mongkut's letter and the accompanying copy of the Franco–Siamese Treaty to Ang Duong at Oudong and the other one staying in Kampot, while Thai chronicles state that these were the Khmer language interpreters Montigny had asked for. Upon arrival, the Siamese official came down from the Capricieuse to threaten the Cambodian officials in Kampot not to cooperate with Montigny and the French.

Lieutenant De la Motte, with his corvette Marceau, took Montigny, his family and Godeaux to arrive in Kampot on 5 October 1856. Kampot on the Southwestern coast had been the only available seaport of Cambodia for maritime trade. The city of Kampot, with 3,000 inhabitants, was actually a conglomeration of many ethnic sub-towns including the Chinese town of Prey Srok, the Malay town of Trapeang Svay, the Vietnamese town of Tien-Thanh and the Cambodian town of Kampong Bay. Montigny and the Marceau joined Collier and the Capricieuse at the Chinese ethnic town of Prey Srok, entering the Prek Thom River. At Prey Srok, Bishop Jean-Claude Miche the Apostolic Vicar of Cambodia, who had been waiting for Montigny in Kampot for many months, came on board the Marceau to greet Montigny. Bishop Miche told Montigny that the Cambodian king Ang Duong had entrusted him to receive Montigny in Kampot and the king would soon travel from his capital Oudong to meet Montigny.

Due to Montigny's persisting delay in his diplomatic mission to Vietnam, Commodore Collier decided to leave with Godeaux on the Capricieuse to Vietnam as the strong northeastern monsoon winds during the last months of the year would render naval journey from Cambodia to Vietnam difficult. Montigny and the Marceau would stay in Cambodia until Montigny's Cambodian businesses were finished. Collier warned Montigny not to spend too much time in Cambodia and should hurry to Vietnam.

A French missionary named Lafitte took Montigny and his family on small vessels to go upstream the Prek Kampot River (now called Preaek Teuk Chhou River) to reach the Cambodian town of Kampong Bay, the administrative headquarter of Kampot. Bishop Miche assigned Montigny and his family to reside in the abandoned storehouse that used to belong to Evans, a British–Malay mixed merchant from Singapore, the house that Montigny also shared with Bishop Miche and Miche's assistant Father Arsène Hestrest.

As soon as Montigny took residence in this storehouse, Bishop Jean-Claude Miche came to tell Montigny that among the nine Cambodian men Collier had taken from Bangkok was a Siamese official who came to spy on Montigny's venture in Cambodia. This Siamese official had been threatening the Khmer officials in Kampot and had come to ask Miche about the reason why Montigny the French plenipotentiary came to Cambodia. Bishop Miche warned Montigny that presence of this Siamese official would jeopardize Montigny's diplomatic mission in Cambodia. King Ang Duong would not dare to meet Montigny because the King of Cambodia would tremble in fear just by hearing the name of the King of Siam.

Montigny summoned that Siamese official to meet him at his residence. Montigny immediately remembered this Siamese official as being present during Montigny's earlier audience with the three Cambodian princes in Bangkok arranged by Prince Wongsa. Montigny reached his own conclusion that this Siamese was sent by Prince Wongsa under the command of the Siamese king Mongkut. Montigny interrogated this Siamese spy why did a Siamese subject deceptively pose himself as a Cambodian to board the French warship Capricieuse to Cambodia, to which the Siamese official replied that he just went a leisure trip to Cambodia. Montigny noticed that the Siamese official stood to speak to him with defiance, in contrast to other Cambodian officials in the room who were prostrating on the floor. Montigny then commanded the official to lower down like the rest of the Cambodians or else Montigny would treat him as a deserter and would take due actions.

Facing Montigny's threat, the Siamese official backed down and eventually confessed that he had been sent by the Prince Kromma Luang Wongsa to board on the French warships. Montigny objected that Prince Wongsa had never taken any initiatives and this should be the original idea of the Siamese king Mongkut. Montigny then became angry at Mongkut, saying that he had never concealed his diplomatic mission to Cambodia and had informed the Siamese king many times. Siam's clandestine attempt to place a spy at Montigny's side was a grave insult to the French imperial plenipotentiary and could affect Franco–Siamese relations that had just been renewed. Montigny gave an ultimatum to the Siamese spy official to leave Kampot within twenty-four hours or else Montigny would force him onto the Capricieuse, which Collier would take to Vietnam, where the Siamese official was certain to be executed by the Vietnamese. That Siamese official was then obliged to leave Kampot per Montigny's threat to join the other two Siamese officials in Oudong.

This episode of Montigny expelling the Siamese spy from Kampot on 5 October 1856 was recounted many times in the French historiography of Cambodia. Jean Moura, the French representative in Cambodia in the 1870s and author of Le royaume du Cambodge (1883), criticized Montigny's action, saying that Montigny was too consumed by his anger and should instead inflict a calculated punishment by imprisoning the Siamese spy on the French warship. Charles Meyniard, in his Le Second Empire an Indo-Chine (1891), defended Montigny, saying that any explicit punishments on the Siamese spy official would break down the renewed Franco–Siamese relations, something Montigny did not desire and was of no use because the Cambodian king would be influenced by Siam anyway. Franco–Siamese relations in the 1850s were mostly cordial, in contrast to Moura's time of the 1870s, when the Franco–Siamese relations went downhill over Cambodia.

Commodore Collier took Ernest-Napoléon Godeaux on the Capricieuse to leave Prey Srok, Kampot, on 7 October 1856, leaving for Vietnam to join Captain Le Lieur and the Catinat. Next day, on October 8, the Arrow Incident happened in Canton, where Chinese authorities seized the Chinese lorcha Arrow hoisting British flag in suspicion of piracy and arrested its Chinese crew. The Chinese put down the British flag from Arrow, a great offense in Western diplomacy. The British had been contemplating an opportunity to revise the Nanking Treaty (1842). This Arrow Incident became the perfect casus belli for the British. Harry Parkes the British Consul at Canton and Sir John Bowring the Governor of Hong Kong, both former envoys to Siam, exaggerated the incident to become a full war. Efforts of Bowring and Parkes to capitalize on the incident led to the Second Opium War. The French and the Americans in China were reluctant to follow the British urge for them to join, considering the British intervention rather unjustified.

=== Montigny's refusal to go to Oudong ===
Montigny arrived in Cambodia with confidence, flattered by his success in Siam. Even though Count Walewski had assigned Montigny only to tell the King of Cambodia that his gifts had been lost, Bishop Jean-Claude Miche the Apostolic Vicar of Cambodia urged that Montigny should also procure Christian freedom and security from King Ang Duong. Montigny was then poised to conclude a commercial and religious treaty with Cambodia, in similar manner that he had concluded with Siam and was going to conclude with Vietnam. Montigny recognized Siam's suzerainty over Cambodia but somehow understood that Cambodia could independently seek relations with France without Siamese approval. On 6 October 1856, the day after Montigny's expulsion of the Siamese spy, Oknha Sena Anchit the Cambodian governor of Kampot came to see Montigny, who assumed that the governor would not dare to meet Montigny if the Siamese official had not been rid of. Oknha Sena Anchit told Montigny and Bishop Miche that King Ang Duong would take journey from his capital Oudong to arrive in Kampot in ten or twelve days to meet Montigny.

Montigny and Bishop Miche waited for the arrival of the Cambodian king Ang Duong in Kampot for six days, during which Oknha Sena Anchit and Father Lafitte took Montigny, his wife Madame de Montigny and his family to explore the vicinity of Kampot. King Ang Duong was going to depart from his royal capital Oudong when the two Siamese officials from the Capricieuse arrived just in time to bring Mongkut's letter to Ang Duong. Ang Duong had to return to his palace to receive the letter from King Mongkut. According to French account, the Siamese official sat on a chair, while King Ang Duong of Cambodia prostrated on the floor to receive the letter of the Siamese king. Mongkut had approved that Ang Duong could make a treaty with France if the treaty terms were appropriate, having sent a copy of the Franco–Siamese Montigny Treaty to Ang Duong. Ang Duong could also seek assistance from Phra Ratchathani the Siamese official who delivered Mongkut's letter to Ang Duong. Also in the letter, Mongkut knew about Ang Duong's earlier secret endeavor with France in 1853. After reading Mongkut's letter, Ang Duong somehow decided not to go to meet Montigny in Kampot.

On 12 October 1856, a shocking news arrived for Montigny as a letter from Ang Duong to Bishop Miche said that the king was going to embark on his journey but suddenly fell ill with boils so the king was unable to arrive in Kampot and thus invited Montigny to go to Oudong instead. Ang Duong also sent his officials and two hundred elephants to fetch Montigny's retinue and assigned Bishop Miche to arrange for journey of the French plenipotentiary to Oudong. In the letter, Ang Duong related that he had earlier built a road in 1851 connecting Oudong to Kampot, which had been the only available seaport for Cambodia as the Vietnamese had taken control of the Mekong Delta. The journey from Kampot to Oudong took about 200 kilometers but journey on elephant backs took only eight days.

Later account of Bishop Miche stated that Ang Duong was not ill but was instead prevented by the Siamese from coming to Kampot. In Thai historiography, however, the Siamese king Mongkut did not oppose Cambodia signing a 'commercial' treaty with France, even encouraging Ang Duong to consider as the Siamese king had sent a copy of Montigny's Siamese Treaty to the Cambodian king beforehand. Both Montigny and Bishop Miche were shocked at this unfortunate turn of event. The French had been planning for Ang Duong to meet Montigny in Kampot. Montigny did not have any prospects of going to Oudong as he had already been late on his mission to Vietnam, which was his main objective and he was supposed to spend little time in Cambodia. Montigny also remembered the words of Siamese king Mongkut, who had told Montigny that the journey from Kampot to Oudong was an arduous one. Montigny then decided to turn down Ang Duong's invitation for him to go to Oudong.

On 14 October 1856, fifteen Cambodian ministers and officials including Chauvea Tolaha Keo the Prime Minister, Oknha Chakrey Meas the Minister of War, Oknha Kralahom Keo the Minister of Navy, Oknha Essorea Akkharea Prak the royal secretary, etc., arrived in Kampot with two hundred elephants to fetch Montigny and his family to Oudong, even though Montigny had declined travelling. Next day, on October 15, the ministers presented Ang Duong's letter to Bishop Miche, appointing Miche as the Cambodian plenipotentiary to conclude a treaty with France and promising to endorse any treaties the bishop was to make in case Montigny would not go to Oudong. Montigny said to the Cambodian ministers that, if Cambodia was to procure an amicable relation with France, Cambodia should ensure freedom and protection of the missonaries. Montigny also warned Oknha Kralahom the son-in-law of Ang Duong, whom Montigny was told about of being hostile towards the missionaries, that any negative intentions towards the missionaries would result in fatal consequences. The Cambodian ministers then presented the gifts from Ang Duong, silk fabric and ivory, to Montigny.

=== Montigny's Cambodian Treaty draft ===
As Bishop Jean-Claude Miche was empowered as the Cambodia plenipotentiary, Montigny and Miche worked together to produce a treaty draft, the Commercial and Religious Convention (French: Convention Commerciale et Religieuse), consisting of fourteen articles, which was signed by Montigny on 18 October 1856. The treaty terms were mostly similar to the preceding Franco–Siamese Treaty earlier concluded by Montigny in August 1856 but shorter and less-detailed. The treaty terms included;

1. Most Favored Nation clause; if Cambodia granted any rights or privileges to any other nations, France would also be accorded the same.
2. French subjects were entitled to travel to anywhere and reside in anywhere in Cambodia.
3. French merchants were to trade freely in Cambodia without subjecting to any restrictions nor monopolies, except for opium duty, which had been the income of the Cambodian court.
4. French imported commodities would only be subjected to a low three-percent import duty ad valorem (exactly the same as in the Siamese Treaties), which would be levied only once.
5. Any French vessels, including warships, were at total freedom to visit and anchor at any of the Cambodian seaports. The King of Cambodia would also treat and protect French ships as his own vessels.
6. The French Emperor might appoint a Consul to Cambodia. The French Consul would reserve his right to hoist the French flag and would be accorded similar privileges as the Consuls of other nations.
7. The Cambodian government would support French scientists and naturalists in their venture to study Cambodian geography and wildlife in Cambodian hinterlands.
8. If any French merchants or French ships were robbed in Cambodia, both on land and at sea, the Cambodian government was obliged to arrest the perpetrator and retrieve the stolen goods. However, failure to do so did not accord compensation.
9. If a French subject died in Cambodia, the Cambodian government would arrange for the wealth of the dead to be inherited by the rightful heirs.
10. Christian missionaries were free to go to anywhere to preach Gospel anywhere in Cambodia without any restrictions.
11. Roman Catholicism became another 'state religion' (religions de L'État) of Cambodia apart from Theravada Buddhism. This article was probably requested by Bishop Miche. Cambodian Christians would not be forced to attend Buddhist ceremonies and the Cambodians could convert to Christianity without any restrictions.
12. France could export teak logs from Cambodia, subjected to a ten-percent export duty ad valorem.
13. This treaty was made in four copies, each two in Khmer and French languages.
14. This treaty would come into effect only at the ratification by the French government.

The terms of this Franco–Cambodian Treaty draft, put forward by the two French Montigny and Miche, were rather one-sided agreements, without any involvements of the native Cambodians and did not address protection of Cambodia's independence from the powerful suzerains; Siam and Vietnam.

=== Issue of Phú Quốc Island ===
Apart from the treaty draft with fourteen articles, Montigny also produced the supplementary treaty annex, in which King Ang Duong of Cambodia would cede the Phú Quốc Island, known in Khmer as Koh Tral and in Siamese as Koh Dot, to France. The Annex was also signed by Montigny on 18 October 1856. Earlier, in efforts to borrow French hands to counter Vietnamese influences, the Siamese ministers including Kalahom Chuang Bunnag, Phrakhlang Kham Bunnag and the Prince Wongsathirat Sanit all persuaded Montigny that France should take possession of Phú Quốc Island for its natural resources and strategic position, allegedly inhabited by a few Vietnamese fishermen. Montigny claimed that Bishop Jean-Claude Miche had told Montigny that Ang Duong himself wanted to give Koh Tral to France. Bishop Miche, however, refuted saying such thing. Though not empowered nor assigned to receive any territorial concessions, Montigny thought that he should not let this opportunity of French territorial acquisition pass without consideration, citing a number of reasons;

- The location of Phú Quốc was strategic, situating in the middle of the Indochinese region on the trade route between China and India. France could utilize Phú Quốc as her commercial and naval base.
- France taking control of Phú Quốc would also prevent other competing Western nations to do the same.

The Siamese convinced Montigny to draft a treaty in October 1856 for Cambodia to cede Phú Quốc or Koh Tral, which had been under control of Nguyen dynasty, to France. King Ang Duong of Cambodia eventually rejected this treaty.

Cambodia ceding Phú Quốc or Koh Tral to France in 1856 was irrelevant because the island had been under Vietnamese control. Neither Cambodia nor Siam had actual control over the island. The Siamese convinced Montigny that Cambodia could cede Phú Quốc to France, even though the island had been under Vietnamese control. In this treaty annex, the King of Cambodia peacefully cede the island to France;

I [King of Cambodia] declare that I grant and make full and complete cession to His Majesty the Emperor of the French of the island called in Cambodian Cô Trol and in Annamite Phú Quoc and in English Koh Doot, situated between 10° and 11° north latitude, on 104° east longitude, about 9 miles from the mouth of the Campot River, belonging to my kingdom and currently occupied by some Annamese fishermen.

French acquisition of Koh Tral or Phú Quoc would earn Cambodia a French protection against Vietnamese incursions and would also satisfy the Siamese goal by putting the French to shield Siam against Vietnam;

The occupation of the island of Cô Trol by France will be considered by me and my subjects as a great benefit, for it will place beside us a powerful friend who, by his mere presence, will protect us against the vexatious attacks of the Annamites, our natural enemies. This occupation should, in the respect, also be pleasing to my overlord, the sovereign of Siam, by placing between him and the Annamites, his friends and allies, the French.

=== Montigny convincing Ang Duong to accept the treaty ===
As Montigny did not personally go to present his treaty draft to King Ang Duong at Oudong due to his hurry to embark on his journey to Vietnam, he had to send someone to deliver it. Montigny also wrote an apology letter to Ang Duong. In the letter, Montigny expressed his sympathy for Cambodia enduring the Vietnamese taking away its lands, depriving Cambodia of its commercial potential to export products. Montigny, however, did not consider Siam being oppressive on Cambodia because Montigny had recognized Siam as the rightful suzerain over Cambodia. Montigny could only relay the Phú Quốc Island cession proposal to the French government.

I [Montigny] have carefully reviewed the letter your wrote to His Greatness Monsignor Miche, inviting him to share it with me. I fully acknowledge, along with Your Majesty [Ang Duong], the deplorable state into which the successive usurpations of the Annamites have reduced the Kingdom of Cambodia and the impossibility they have placed you in from developing its trade and utilizing its numerous and abundant natural resources. I can only fully approve the wisdom of your approach to my powerful sovereign and master, His Majesty Napoleon III, Emperor of the French.

In his 'apology' letter, Montigny urged King Ang Duong of Cambodia to accept and sign his treaty draft, which would cement Franco–Cambodian relations. Montigny reminded Ang Duong that all the Siamese ministers, the King of Siam and Ang Duong himself had been desiring to give the island to France. As Montigny required Bishop Jean-Claude Miche to follow him to Vietnam as interpreter, he assigned Miche's assistant the 26-year-old French MEP priest Arsène Hestrest to bring three documents; Montigny's fourteen-article Franco–Cambodian Treaty draft, the Treaty Annex ceding Phú Quốc from Cambodia to France and Montigny's apology letter, all of them to Ang Duong at Oudong. Montigny was overconfident that the Cambodian king would accept his treaty draft without hassle. The young priest Hestrest had not been well-versed in Khmer language and culture and had just arrived in 1854, two years prior.

In order to ensure that King Ang Duong would accept his treaty draft, Montigny gave six points for Father Hestrest to relay to Ang Duong in Oudong;

1. Ang Duong's acceptance of the treaty would indicate his goodwill to the French Emperor, securing the Franco–Cambodian relations.
2. If Ang Duong refused to accept the treaty, he would be compelled to sign this kind of treaty with France or other nations anyway, unless Cambodia wanted to adopt anti-Western sentiment in the same manner as Vietnam.
3. Ang Duong could independently sign this treaty without Siamese consent, despite his status of being a vassal of Siam, "the most suspicious overlord." Montigny asserted that he had already explained to the Siamese king Mongkut that Cambodia signing a treaty with France would also benefit Siam because French influence would protect both Cambodia and Siam from Vietnamese aggressions. When this Franco–Cambodian Treaty, which was essentially the same as the Franco–Siamese Treaty Montigny had earlier concluded, was signed, Montigny would also sent a copy of this treaty to Mongkut with explanations.
4. Montigny was upset by Ang Duong's refusal to come to meet Montigny in Kampot. Ang Duong's excuse of illness was not satisfactory. If Ang Duong did not provide a clear explanation, Montigny would assume that the Cambodian king had deliberately avoided meeting him.
5. Montigny preferred to negotiate with the native Cambodian ministers Ang Duong had sent to him but they were not friendly. Montigny complained that the Oknha Kralahom was particularly hostile to him. Montigny suspected that, unless they had been under foreign ("Siamese") influences, it was the King of Cambodia himself who did not want to establish relations with France.
6. If Ang Duong did not accept this treaty, Montigny would give a "very unfavorable account" of Cambodia to Paris and would consider Ang Duong a mere provincial governor under Siam.

Montigny also suggested, through Hestrest, that Ang Duong, like Mongkut, should also send Cambodian exotic animals to him for display in France. Montigny, in turn, sent his own gifts, including weapons and tableware, to Ang Duong at Oudong. Hestrest departed with the Cambodian officials, led by Chauvea Tolaha Keo the Cambodian Prime Minister, from Kampot to Oudong, with Montigny's treaty draft and letter. After finishing his businesses in Cambodia, Montigny, his family and Bishop hurriedly board on the Marceau to embark on their next journey to Vietnam. The Montigny Mission left Prey Srok in Kampot on 22 October 1856, having spent time in Cambodia for the total of 17 days, with Montigny not ever meeting the Cambodian King Ang Duong.

== Interlude ==
=== Arrival of Collier in Danang ===
When Charles de Montigny the French imperial plenipotentiary had been in Bangkok, he dispatched captaine de frégate Le Lieur to take the French corvette Catinat to bring his introduction letter to the Vietnamese imperial court at Huế. Le Lieur and the Catinat departed from Siam in August 1856 and reached Danang in September. The Vietnamese, however, refused to accept Montigny's letter and Le Lieur saw this refusal as the insult to the prestige of French nation. Le Lieur then took the Catinat to bombard Danang on 26 September 1856, inflicting damages and casualties on the Vietnamese and the forts. Le Lieur anchored the Catinat to occupy Sơn Trà promontary in front of Danang Bay. Le Lieur's attack softened Vietnamese stance, who, according to French sources, came to seek negotiation but Le Lieur replied that the Vietnamese should wait for the arrival of Montigny in order to conclude a treaty.

Montigny's retinue reached the Cambodian port of Kampot in October 1856. Capitaine de vaisseau or 'Commodore' Jules Collier, seeing Montigny's delay, decided to part from Montigny and left Kampot on 7 October 1856 with the large sailing corvette Capricieuse to join Le Lieur in Danang. Collier on the Capricieuse went down to Singapore and then proceeded northeast towards Vietnam.

As Montigny had assigned the French priest Hestrest to bring his Cambodian Treaty draft to King Ang Duong to sign at Oudong, Montigny, along with his family and Bishop Jean-Claude Miche the Apostolic Vicar of Cambodia, whom Montigny took as his interpreter in Vietnam, hurriedly boarded on the Marceau to leave Kampot but a storm on 18 October 1856 prevented them from leaving. On the same day of October 18th, Collier and the Capricieuse were at Triton Island when they were battered by the storm, causing a hole on the ship with seawater incoming, which Collier struggled to contain to prevent the ship from wrecking. As the storm subsided, Lieutenant de vaisseau Le Fer de la Motte took Montigny's retinue on the Marceau to eventually leave Kampot on 22 October 1856.

Battered by the storm, Commodore Jules Collier arrived in Danang with the Capricieuse on 24 October 1856, where he met Le Lieur and the Catinat. Le Lieur reported his assault on Danang a month earlier to his superior Collier, who pointed out that Le Lieur had exceeded his instructions, which was just to peacefully deliver Montigny's letter to the Vietnamese court, but Le Lieur's decision to initiate the attack to uphold French national prestige was justified.

According to French sources, the Vietnamese were then in a very receptive gesture to negotiate a treaty with France, partly due to the effect of Le Lieur's show of French naval power. However, the delay of Montigny, his failure to arrive in time, spoiled this occasion. Seeing arrival of a new French warship, the Vietnamese sent four young mandarins to see Collier on the Capricieuse on October 25. Collier, whose name was recorded in Đại Nam thực lục as "Cô Ly Hưu", informed the Vietnamese that he had come in peace and asked for the reply of the Vietnamese Emperor to Montigny's letter sent earlier. The Vietnamese replied that they were eager to negotiate with France but they could not present the letter to the Vietnamese Emperor because Montigny, in his letter, had addressed the Vietnamese Emperor as "King" (Roi) not "Emperor" (Empereur). Collier offered to correct the letter in order for the Vietnamese to present Montigny's letter to the Emperor. Vietnamese officials brought Montigny's letter to Collier to correct the wording on October 30. The Emperor Tự Đức himself, upon learning of arrival of another French warship, strengthened the Vietnamese defenses.

Lieutenant de la Motte was unable to sail the Marceau from Cambodia directly to northeast to Vietnam due to strong opposing monsoon winds so he took the Marceau and Montigny to Singapore instead, reaching Singapore on November 2nd.

=== Collier's correspondence with Trần Hoằng ===
On 5 November 1856, the Vietnamese Emperor Tự Đức had Trần Hoằng the Tổng đốc Nam Nghĩa governor of Quảng Nam and Quảng Ngãi provinces, called the Governor of Quảng Nam (Gouverneur de Kouang-nam) by the French, write a letter to Jules Collier. In the letter, Trần Hoằng told Collier that his subordinate Le Lieur had earlier arrived with threat that Vietnam should sign a treaty with France or else Le Lieur would attack, saying that France had been dissatisfied about Vietnam, which the Vietnamese did not know what it was about. Trần Hoằng also related further that Le Lieur had no patience as he could not wait for Vietnamese responses and hurried up to deliver the letter at Hiun-ngan (Thuận An), where the official did not dare to receive the letter so he left the letter on the beach. After that, Le Lieur, without any just causes, attacked Danang and demanded that the letter be delivered to the Emperor. Trần Tri the previous Prefect of the Province then opened the letter and sent it to Huế. If the letter was to be presented to the Emperor, the wording should change from "King" to "Emperor" first.

When Collier arrived, he requested that the wording of the letter should be changed so that the letter could be presented to the Vietnamese Emperor and the incident of French warship attacking Vietnam would not happen again. However, the Vietnamese damages and casualties inflicted by the French warship Catinat had been done and France should compensate to Vietnam;

If the French are frank and justified, we [the Vietnamese] ask that they obey the constituted authorities and that, in their comings and goings, they respect the customs of the country they are in. Why violate them? Peace is of importance, and the Kingdom of Annam does not want to be alone in disagreement with France.

These explanations are given only in private, as it seems appropriate to wait for the Ambassador [Montigny] to discuss the treaty with him, and that will be quick. If the Ambassador is delayed, let it not be a cause of difficulty between us. Let the French ships have confidence in our commitment and in the treaty to be concluded between the two nations; let them have enough confidence in us to return the forts [Sơn Trà] they have taken from us

Trần Hoằng the Governor of Quảng Nam assured Collier that there would be an amicable relation between France and Vietnam and the treaty should be in accordance with native Vietnamese law, also asking the French to return Sơn Trà they had been occupying. Jules Collier wrote a reply letter to Trần Hoằng, defending Le Lieur's action last month as self-defense. In the letter, Collier pointed out that the French warship, out of consideration to Vietnam, had been disarmed when delivering the letter at Thuận An but the Vietnamese were very hostile. Refusing to receive and open French diplomatic letter was an insult to the French nation. Collier defended that Le Lieur had been restraint at Vietnamese 'provocations'. Collier also recounted that, when Le Lieur and the Catinat were in Danang, they were isolated and quarantined like a leper. Le Lieur had also seen Vietnamese military mobilizations in Danang so he was obliged to initiate the pre-emptive strike in self-defense

When the Catinat returned to Tourane, all communication with him [Le Lieur] was forbidden; he was kept apart, like a leper; Could the Commander [Le Lieur] believe in your friendly intention? Formidable forts surrounded his anchorage, silent at first; he soon noticed an extraordinary movement, a greater activity; he wrote to you, warning you that he could not remain a quiet spectator of these hostile preparations; you did not reply. Shouldn't the Catinat have foreseen an imminent attack, a great bloodshed? To avoid such a misfortune, he preempted your attack and rendered harmless, without destroying them, the instruments that would have made a treaty of friendship impossible.

Has the Catinat not, in this circumstance, once again shown great restraint?

Commodore Collier decided to report to his superior Admiral Ferdinand-Alphonse Hamelin the French Minister of Marines at Paris about Le Lieur's attack on Danang, defending the assault on the Vietnamese seaport to uphold the prestige of France as justified. Collier even proposed Hamelin to promote Le Lieur from the rank of capitaine de frégate to capitaine de vaisseau. The Capricieuse in Danang ran out of food and provisions so Collier sent Le Lieur and the Catinat to fetch resources from the French naval base at Macau for him. Le Lieur and the Catinat left Danang on October 10.

Bishop François Pellerin of Byblos the Apostolic Vicar of Northern Cochinchina had been preaching and hiding near Huế, suffering from hunger and hardships. Upon learning of the imminent arrival of the French plenipotentiary in Danang, Bishop Pellerin traveled from Huế to Danang, risking being caught by the Vietnamese authorities. Upon reaching Danang, Bishop Pellerin disguised himself as French sailor, managing to slip onto the Capricieuse to take refuge under Commodore Collier.

Collier and Le Lieur, the Capricieuse and the Catinat, waited for Montigny in Danang. Collier speculated that, due to the strong northwestern monsoon, Montigny and the Marceau might have to take the circumventing route by going to Singapore, Borneo and then to Manila in order to reach Danang in Vietnam. Collier sent Le Lieur and the Catinat to search for Montigny and the Marceau at Manila several times but did not find them. Trần Hoằng the Governor of Quảng Nam reported to Emperor Tự Đức that there were two French warships at Danang, with one anchoring still and another going back and forth, arriving and leaving. As Montigny had not arrived yet, the shock from French attack died down and the Vietnamese began to be bold and hostile again. Eventually, Rear Admiral Guérin the French naval commander at Macau recalled the Catinat, whose presence in Vietnam was of no use. Le Lieur was then obliged to take the Catinat to leave Danang to return to Macau, leaving the Montigny Mission for good, leaving Collier and the Capricieuse in Danang waiting for Montigny.

Lieutenant De la Motte took Montigny and the Marceau from Singapore to go through storms and monsoons. The small steam corvette Marceau was leaky through the journey, requiring repairs at British Labuan in Borneo and Spanish Manila in the Philippines, further delaying Montigny's journey to Vietnam.

=== Ang Duong's rejection of Montigny's Treaty ===
Montigny had assigned the 26-year-old French missionary Arsène Hestrest, assistant to Bishop Jean-Claude Miche, to bring Montigny's fourteen-article Franco–Cambodian Treaty draft, the Treaty ceding Phú Quốc Island or Koh Tral from Cambodia to France and Montigny's apology letter to King Ang Duong of Cambodia at Oudong. For Hestrest did not know Khmer language well, Bishop Miche assigned the 34-year-old Louis Aussoleil, another French missionary, to accompany Hestrest for translation. The Cambodian ministers led the two French priests Hestrest and Aussoleil to ride on elephant backs from Kampot to Oudong, reaching Oudong in early November 1856. However, they had to wait for some time. In November 1856, when Hestrest was in Oudong, according to Thai records, the Vietnamese governor at Châu Đốc (Tổng đốc An Hà Cao Hữu Phùng) sent a delegate to Oudong to remind Ang Duong that tributes were due next year.

Also in November 1856, the French government discovered the Cambodian gifts in Toulon, where they had been since 1854, earlier sent by Ang Duong in 1853. The gifts were forwarded to Emperor Napoleon III. Count Walewski the French Foreign Minister reminded the imperial household that the Emperor should reciprocate this Cambodian goodwill gesture by sending some gifts to the Cambodian king in return.

Even before the audience, Ang Duong knew beforehand that there would be a treaty term about Cambodia ceding Koh Tral or Phú Quốc to France. Ang Duong decided to send a delegate to inform the Vietnamese governor at Châu Đốc that France wanted Cambodia to give Phú Quốc to France but Ang Duong, on behalf of Vietnam, had rejected this proposal. This news caused a great alarm among Southern Vietnamese mandarins, leading to intensive military preparations including the clearing of Vĩnh Tế Canal to facilitate movement of Vietnamese troops from Châu Đốc to Hà Tiên. The Emperor of Vietnam allegedly commanded that Southern Vietnamese governors should resist the speculated French entry, on the pain of death upon failure. On November 22, the Châu Đốc governor sent a letter to Ang Duong, asking an ominous question whether Ang Duong was still grateful to the Vietnamese Emperor.

Hestrest and Aussoleil were granted an audience with the Cambodian king Ang Duong to present Montigny's documents on 24 November 1856. The two Siamese officials from the Capricieuse were also present. Phraya Aphaiphubet Nong the Siam-appointed governor of Battambang sent his son Luang Aphaiphitak (called Luong P'ay by the French, This Luang Aphaiphitak would become Chaophraya Kathathon the governor of Battambang upon the death of his father in 1860.) to attend this meeting. Hestrest found the audience to be crowded with Khmer and some Siamese officials. Hestrest also remembered the two Siamese officials from the Capricieuse. Hestrest suggested to Ang Duong the audience should be discreet but Ang Duong insisted that he had no secrets to hide from the Siamese.

King Harireak Reamea Ang Duong of Cambodia, in the audience, acted in a very angry emotion at Montigny's refusal to come to have an actual audience with him in Oudong. Montigny instead sent two young French missionaries to deliver such treaty drafts. Ang Duong asked Hestrest why did the French plenipotentiary not come to see him; "What reason could have motivated Monsieur de Montigny's refusal to come to Oudong to discuss these very points with me in person? Is he unaware that its not the king's place to seek out an inferior? Since he did not come, is it because he did not wish to deal with me as a friend? Because he wished to deceive me? I will never consent to enter into business with him."

Hestrest deplored Ang Duong to consider the treaty terms but the Cambodian king simply brushed them off. Hestrest presented Montigny's letter to Ang Duong, who simply took it to his interpreter to open and translate without care. The French missionaries were shocked at Ang Duong's hostile gesture towards the treaty. Hestrest presented Montigny's gift of a magnificent rifle to Ang Duong, who did not take interest in it. Ang Duong did not even listen to Hestrest's explanation of each articles of the treaty.

Hestrest then relayed Montigny's six points to Ang Duong, saying that if Ang Duong did not accept this treaty, it would be detrimental to Cambodia and France would consider Cambodia a mere vassal of Siam. Hestrest explained the reason Montigny did not visit Ang Duong was that because Ang Duong himself had earlier promised to go to Kampot but somehow the Cambodian king changed his mind, not upholding his promise but instead sent his ministers, who had not been empowered to negotiate, to Montigny. Hestrest said that Montigny had been in great urgency to go to Vietnam so he did not come to see Ang Duong in person.

About the issue of Cambodia ceding Phú Quốc or Koh Tral to France, Ang Duong denied saying anything about ceding the island that had not been controlled by him. Phú Quốc had been under Vietnamese control, not under Cambodian control. Giving Vietnam's Phú Quốc to France was an act of war. Hestrest attempted to convince Ang Duong that agreeing to these Montigny's proposals would benefit both Cambodia and Siam but Ang Duong would not listen. Hestrest told Ang Duong that the issue of ceding Koh Tral to France had already been discussed by Montigny with the Siamese government and Ang Duong should follow the Siamese. Ang Duong replied "The King of Siam acts as he sees fit. For my part, I act in my own way, and nothing obliges me to conform my actions to those of the King of Siam."

After the audience, Luang Aphaiphitak from Battambang commanded that Montigny's treaty draft and letter given to him to Battambang. As Ang Duong refused to accept any of Montigny's terms, Hestrest concluded that the two Siamese officials from the Capricieuse and the Battambang delegate had threatened the Cambodian king not to accept the French treaty proposal. Ang Duong, in fact, refused to sign a treaty that guaranteed him nothing but instead exposed his earlier secret endeavor with France to the Siamese. Moreover, even though Ang Duong had closer ties with Siam, Vietnam was still feared. Ang Duong was, at least diplomatically, a vassal of Vietnam as Cambodia's triennial tributes to Vietnam at Châu Đốc served to prevent Vietnamese aggression.

=== Ang Duong's letter to Emperor Napoleon III ===
As King Harireak Reamea Ang Duong of Cambodia had rejected Montigny's treaty proposal during the audience of 24 November 1856, next day, on November 25, Ang Duong produced two letters and gave to Hestrest, one for Montigny the French plenipotentiary and the other one for the French Emperor Napoleon III. In his letter to Montigny, Ang Duong related his reason of rejection of Montigny's treaty draft, saying that the treaty terms were of impact and importance and Montigny had not come to discuss these terms with Ang Duong himself. Moreover, Ang Duong had to consult the King of Siam before signing any treaties.

I [Ang Duong] cannot sign or seal them [treaty terms] because a treaty is an important matter that settles reciprocal interests and whose consequences must be long-lasting. There have not yet been any conferences between the French and the Cambodian mandarins capable of showing on which side the advantage or loss might lie, and subsequently determining an agreement. I have written to the King of Siam to tell him that if he orders these conferences, I will conclude the treaty. For the moment, therefore, I cannot sign or seal this document. As for Cô Trol, the Annamites had seized it a long time ago so I cannot offer it to His Majesty the Emperor, for the indignant Annamites would cry out: "King of Cambodia, you are a traitor and deceiver, for you wish to harm us." Then, they will break peace, seeing this act of treason.

In his letter to Napoleon III, Ang Duong began with expressing his wish to establish relations with the French Emperor, narrating his earlier gesture in 1853 when Bishop Jean-Claude Miche, on behalf of Ang Duong, sent a letter and gifts to Gauthier the French Consul at Singapore in order for them to be forwarded to the French government;

For many years, the Missionaries have agreed to say with praise for France: "The Sovereign of France and the French who observe the Catholic Religion have hearts inclined to relieve all miseries, and are far from harming anyone's interests or invading; but they rescue all misfortunes and provide advantage and prosperity; the Sovereign of France truly has noble intentions, unlike some other European governments that seek only to corrupt and harm." Having heard such accounts, here is my intention in my gratitude. I wish to enter into an alliance with Your Majesty, who has such noble intentions, in order to enjoy the advantages of a long and lasting friendship and to be able to extend my kingdom with great benefit to the people. I, therefore, had a letter written by Bishop Miche of Dansara to express my friendship to you, and offered Your Majesty four elephant tusks, two rhinoceros horns, five quintals of gambodge, five quintals of sugar, and five quintals of pepper – a gift from which I have received no news for several years.

Then, Ang Duong recounted, in his own version, the adventure of Nguyễn Phúc Ánh who allegedly sought help from Ang Duong's father King Ang Eng (In fact, it was Chaophraya Aphaiphubet who helped Nguyễn Ánh, while Ang Eng stayed in Bangkok.). When Nguyễn Phúc Ánh ascended the throne as Emperor Gia Long, founding the Nguyen dynasty, according to Ang Duong, Gia Long asked for Trapeang (Trà Vinh), which Ang Eng granted and Vietnam did not return it since then;

Cambodia was once large and extensive; but the perfidious Annamites, after making friend with Cambodia, invaded the provinces of the kingdom through successive partitions. When King Gialong was in conflict with his rival, he went to implore the aid of Siam. There he met my father, formed an alliance with him, returned from Siam and Cambodia leading a Cambodian army with which he defeated his enemy and became the sole king of Cochinchina. He then asked my father to exempt the province of Trépang from tribute and forced labor, to which he owed a debt of gratitude. My father, understanding this gesture of peace, agreed to release this Cambodian province; a few years later, King Gialong seized it.

Ang Duong narrated how Emperor Minh Mạng had oppressed Cambodia and Siam came to rescue. This was the Thai version of history of the Siamese–Vietnamese War. When King Ang Chan died in 1835 without a male heir, the Vietnamese took Ang Duong's mother Neak Neang Ros and Ang Duong's daughters to be detained in Saigon. Moreover, the Vietnamese had executed the pro-Thai Cambodian Princess Ang Baen. Then, the Cambodians arose against Vietnamese rule in 1840 and asked for Ang Duong as their king. King Nangklao of Siam sent Chaophraya Bodindecha to help the Khmers drive out the Vietnamese. Eventually, Vietnam accepted Ang Duong as King of Cambodia and Vietnam allegedly promised to return the lands taken from Cambodia;

Minh-mang, son and successor of this king, had a canal dug that divided Cambodia from Hàtien and Mo't chruc, and placed the administration and subjects in the captured provinces. My brother having died without leaving a male heir, Minh-mang banished the daughters and mother of this prince to his province of Saigon and had one of these daughters killed; as for the Cambodians of these regions, he dispersed them, both common people and mandarins, to various islands, as well as to the northern provinces bordering China. The Cambodians, unable to tolerate the treachery of the Annamite king, and having also inflicted a great casualties on the Cochinchinese, asked the King of Siam to govern them. Somdach pra-nang Klau, then on the throne of Siam, sent Budin with an army of more than 5,000 men, and incurred considerable expenses to help the Cambodians against the Annamites, who had not yet definitely occupied all the provinces. After eight years of war, the King of Cochinchina sued for peace and promised to bring back my mother and my brother's daughters, to also bring back the mandarins and the Cambodian subjects scattered here and there, to regard me as King of Cambodia, and to hand over the Annamite seals as a mark of sovereignty. He then made this promise: the Cambodian provinces taken by the Annamites would all be restored. Thereupon, Budin told me: "That is enough for peace." It was, therefore, concluded.

In the letter, Ang Duong informed Napoleon the names of the provinces that Vietnam had taken from Cambodia. If Vietnam ceded these provinces to France, Ang Duong deplored France not to take these dominions because they were supposedly parts of Cambodia;

I ask Your Majesty to know the names of the seized provinces; they are those of Dong-nay (Đồng Nai), taken more than 200 years ago; but much more recently, those of Saigon, Long-hô (Long Hồ), Psar Déc (Sa Đéc), Mithô (Mỹ Tho), Pra-trépang (Trà Vinh), Ougmô'c (Ô Môn), Cremui'n Sâ (Rạch Giá), Tŭ'c Khmău (Cà Mau), Péém or Hatien, and the islands of Co Trol (Phú Quốc) and Trelach (Côn Đảo). If by chance the Annamites were to offer Your Majesty any of these lands, I beg you not to accept them because they belong to Cambodia.

=== Mongkut's letter to Montigny ===
In July 1856, King Mongkut of Siam had the Cambodian prince Ang Voddey (future King Norodom), eldest son of Ang Duong, who had been staying in Bangkok as political hostage since 1848, ordained as a Buddhist monk per coming-of-age tradition. Mongkut then sent Prince Ang Voddey, in monk robes, on a Siamese sailing ship to visit his father Ang Duong in Cambodia. Ang Voddey arrived in Kampot in December 1856, where he continued his journey to Oudong and stayed with his father Ang Duong for a month. On 13 January 1857, Queen Debsirindra, consort of King Mongkut, bore a prince (Prince Chaturonrasmi).

King Mongkut received report that Montigny had sent a letter and gifts to King Ang Duong at Oudong and Mongtigny had left Kampot for Singapore. Mongkut also learned that Montigny's preceding warship (Le Lieur of the Catinat) had attacked Turong (Danang) and the Vietnamese at P'uddhymart (Hà Tiên) and Chodok (Châu Đốc) in Southern Vietnam had been assembling forces in anticipation of a French attack. Phra Ratchathani, called "Mi Muang Thip raj dhany", the Siamese official earlier sent by Siam to bring Mongkut's letter to Ang Duong at Oudong, who had also been present during Hestrest's presentation of Montigny treaty draft in November 1856, returned to Bangkok to present Montigny's treaty draft and Montigny's letter to Ang Duong to the Siamese king Mongkut on January 25. This was when King Mongkut learned of the outcome of Montigny's mission in Cambodia.

King Mongkut wrote a letter on 25 January 1857 to Montigny to verify these news he had received with Montigny himself. In the letter, Mongkut informed Montigny that his queen had given birth to a prince and that Charles Hillier the first-ever British Consul in Siam had died from dysentery in Bangkok in October 1856. Mongkut also told Montigny about sending the eldest son of the Cambodian king to visit his father in Oudong. Lastly, in the letter, Mongkut stated that there were rumors among the Lao people that Vietnam was a greater nation than China and Siam because no Western nations had ever managed to force Vietnam to conclude any treaties;

Cochin Chinese government is most agreatest powerful than Siamese and Chinese nation whom English, French, American and other European nations could compel to accept the Treaties according to their pleasures. But none of Marine powers can compel Cochin Chinese government to do anything for their greatest power.

And the Cochin Chinese king will be perhaps a greatest sovereign absoludely among eastern nation when China and other neighboring nations must become on future subjects to marine power.

Prince Ang Voddey, after staying with his father King Ang Duong in Oudong for about a month, returned to Bangkok in early February 1857, accompanied by some Khmer officials. During an audience, King Mongkut asked Ang Voddey and the Cambodians why did Ang Duong not accept Montigny's treaty, to which Ang Voddey and the Khmers replied that King Ang Duong of Cambodia did not accept Montigny's treaty because Montigny had unilaterally drafted the treaty without consulting the Khmers. Moreover, Cambodia had been a "small country" paying tributes to both Siam and Vietnam. Knowing that Montigny was going to negotiate treaty with Vietnam, Ang Duong decided to wait and see Vietnam's reaction on Montigny. Accepting Montigny's treaty without Vietnamese approval might incur Vietnamese wrath or even invasion;

Monsieur de Montigny, having arrived at Campot, drew up a treaty which he sent by emissary to have the king's seal affixed; but Monsieur de Montigny did not see the King of Cambodia and did not consult with him; the articles of the treaty were not discussed; that is why the matters remains unsolved. As for the treaty that Monsieur de Montigny concluded with the court of Siam, we are fully aware of it. But Cambodia being between Siam and Cochinchina, and knowing that Monsieur de Montigny was to go and make a treaty with Cochinchina, for it is only a small country; the Cochinchinese would have been angered by this and misfortunes could have resulted for Cambodia; that is why no agreement was made to conclude this treaty.

== Montigny Mission in Vietnam ==
=== Montigny's arrival in Danang ===
In January 1857, Évariste Régis Huc the French Lazarist missionary, who was known for his Tibet Mission, presented a note to Emperor Napoleon III of France about the 1787 Treaty of Versailles signed by the French bishop Pigneau de Béhaine on behalf of Nguyễn Phúc Ánh. In the treaty, France under King Louis XVI promised to help Nguyễn Ánh retrieving his kingdom from the Tây Sơn in exchange for Nguyễn Ánh ceding Tourane or Danang to France. The French Revolution caused the treaty to be forgotten. Huc urged Emperor Napoleon III that France had indisputable rights to occupy Danang or Tourane according to this treaty. The occupation of Vietnam would be "easiest thing in the world, offering immense results" for France had a substantial naval force in the China Seas. Huc claimed that Vietnamese people would welcome the French as liberators from the oppressive rule of the Nguyen dynasty. Most importantly, Tourane would be the base of future French expansion in the region. The French Emperor Napoleon III became interested in this project of conquering Danang and assigned Pierre Cintrat the archives keeper of French Foreign Ministry to verify Huc's claims.

After three months of wandering in the sea after departure from Kampot, going through Singapore, Borneo and Manila, enduring storms and monsoon winds, Charles de Montigny, his family and Bishop Miche eventually arrived in Danang on the Marceau on 23 January 1857. By the time of Montigny's arrival, the shock effect of the Catinat's attack on Danang had died down as Le Lieur and the Catinat had already been pulled back to Macau, leaving only Commodore Jules Collier and the Capricieuse to wait for Montigny. The Vietnamese had also repaired and restored the forts earlier destroyed by the Catinat. The Vietnamese sent two oxen as welcoming gifts to Montigny, which Montigny refused out of gratitude

Montigny was shocked upon learning about Le Lieur's unauthorized attack on Danang four months before his arrival. According to Montigny, Le Lieur's attack on Danang did not help Montigny's position in his negotiation Vietnam. As the attack had happened, the French coercive stance should be maintained but Collier instead engaged in a very amicable correspondence with the Governor of Quảng Nam, causing the Vietnamese to be emboldened and "reverted to all the childish arrogance and boastfulness, which they, like the Chinese, are very richly endowed with." Bishop Pellerin the Apostolic Vicar of Northern Cochinchina, who had earlier sought refuge on the Capricieuse, asked Montigny for assistance against Vietnam's Christian persecutions. Montigny was surprised that he was accompanied by three French priests, Pellerin, Miche and Fontaine, in his Vietnamese mission. Montigny chose Pellerin to be his interpreter for the Vietnam Mission.

The Vietnamese in Danang learned of the eventual arrival of the French plenipotentiary and invited Montigny to go to Danang. Next day, on January 24, Montigny and Bishop Pellerin embarked on a small vessel from the Capricieuse to enter Danang, where they were escorted to the government house, greeted by three Vietnamese mandarins and columns of Vietnamese guards. This was when the preliminary conference took place. Montigny adopted a tough stance, reproaching the Vietnamese for mistreatment of Le Lieur, whose attack on Danang was the consequence of the Vietnamese hostility. Montigny also criticized Vietnam's isolationism. Montigny demanded that he would negotiate in Huế Imperial City. The Vietnamese refused, saying it had been the imperial order for the negotiations to take place in Danang. Furious, Montigny commanded the Vietnamese mandarins to write down Montigny's message in Chinese characters to be sent to the Vietnamese Emperor at Huế;

Fourteen years ago, the French Empire concluded treaties of alliance with the Chinese Empire (Treaty of Whampoa, 1844) and, more recently, with the Kingdoms of Siam, Cambodia, and Japan; the English and other Western nations have bound themselves by the same agreements with the same countries; only the Empire of Annam has remained outside this concert; the French Ambassador has come today to propose to it a treaty, which will last one hundred thousand years; this treaty concerns commerce, navigation, and religion. The Empire of Annam has in the past committed many unjust and cruel acts; the French Empire knows this, and yet it still strives to make a treaty that will last ten thousand years.

Also in this message, Montigny declared that he would go to Huế and threatened that, if there were any delays, more French warships would arrive and the British Ambassador (Sir John Bowring) would also arrived in Vietnam to make similar treaty. Montigny sent another message to the Vietnamese Prime Minister, saying "in matters of cunning, the Cochinchinese are no less adept than the Chinese themselves, whose customs, habits, and even official ceremonies I have, moreover, found among them." Through Bishop Pellerin, Montigny demanded that the Vietnamese Emperor should send no less than four prime minister plenipotentiaries (in the same manner as the Siamese five commissioners) to conclude the treaty with in accordance with diplomatic protocol of the civilized world.

Đào Trí the Khâm phái trấn dương quân vụ (欽派鎭洋軍務) or Commander Defending against the West reported to Vietnamese Emperor Tự Đức that the Western envoy claiming to be of the first class rank asked to come to Huế to meet Vietnamese counterparts of the first rank to settle matters, asking the Emperor to send high-ranking officials to see Montigny. Tự Đức considered this Western envoy to be constrained and simply brushed off, saying that Đào Trí should handle this envoy appropriately without any special privileges.

On January 29, five Vietnamese plenipotentiaries arrived in Danang from Huế to negotiate with Montigny. The names of Vietnamese plenipotentiaries were not recorded in the Đại Nam thực lục but the Vietnamese chief negotiator is assumed to be Đào Trí, who had been responsible for defenses against French attacks and reported the French affairs to the Emperor. In Danang, Montigny was ceremonially received with more Vietnamese troops and four war elephants. According to Montigny, the main Vietnamese plenipotentiary was a close relative of the Vietnamese Emperor and seemed to be intelligent. The first meeting between Montigny and the Vietnamese commissioners was amicable. The negotiation about the treaty was set to begin next day on January 30.

=== Montigny's conflict with Đào Trí ===
After numerous French and British advances on Vietnam, this was the first time that the Vietnamese actually went to the negotiation table in the prospect of concluding a modern treaty with Western nation. The negotiation between Montigny and Đào Trí, total of five Vietnamese plenipotentiaries, took place at Danang government house on 30 January 1857, nearly seven months after Montigny's first arrival in Siam. Ernest-Napoléon Godeaux was Montigny's assistant. Bishop Pellerin served as the interpreter.

Conflict arose even before the beginning of the negotiation. Per Western diplomatic protocol, Montigny asked Đào Trí for documents showing full powers accorded by the Vietnamese sovereign. The Vietnamese were totally unfamiliar with Western diplomatic rules. Đào Trí instead showed his official seal, which Montigny considered not adequate to affirm full powers. A heated debate ensued concerning the negotiation powers of Đào Trí. Montigny told Đào Trí that he could only negotiate with fully-empowered plenipotentiaries, whose powers emanated from the sovereign, so that the treaty would have reciprocal binding effects on both France and Vietnam. Đào Trí confessed that he did not have such thing. Montigny then told Đào Trí to acquire full credentials from his sovereign first in order to negotiate. Đào Trí refused, saying that he was not a child and had necessary powers. Seeing Montigny as fussy, Đào Trí said to Montigny; "if you wish to settle matters and make peace, I am ready to do so, if you want war, we will fight." Montigny considered Đào Trí to be oblivious of Western diplomatic protocol so he tried to make Đào Trí understood what the credentials looked like.

Next day, on January 31, Montigny brought his own paper describing his credentials as the French plenipotentiary appointed by the French Emperor Napoleon III with Chinese explanation;

The Plenipotentiary of His Majesty Napoleon III, Emperor of the French, declares that he hereby submits the faithful translation of the full powers, which his sovereign has entrusted to him to negotiate with the Plenipotentiaries endowed with the full powers of His Majesty the Emperor of Cochinchina a solemn treaty of friendship, commerce, navigation and religion.

It is customary in all countries of the world for the respective Plenipotentiaries to verify their full powers before beginning negotiations, and that it is absolutely essential that the Annamese Plenipotentiaries receive those of their Sovereign, so that His Majesty the Emperor of the French does not remain the only party bound and that there is complete reciprocity; that this is how it was done for the treaties with China, Siam, and all the other Kingdoms.

Montigny threatened that, if the Vietnamese plenipotentiaries were not accorded with full powers, he would have to go to Huế to find out whether the Vietnamese Emperor really wanted to conclude a treaty with France. Đào Trí was dissatisfied at Montigny's repeated threats of going to Huế, saying that if France wanted to fight, Vietnam would fight; "We the Annamese know very well that, at sea, the French are the strongest, but that, on land, we Cochinchinese do not yet know if we will be as strong." Đào Trí then pointed at a Vietnamese soldier, saying that such Vietnamese soldier did not fear three Europeans.

Montigny shrugged his shoulders and stopped Đào Trí mid-speech, saying that the Vietnamese knew nothing of war. Montigny urged the Vietnamese to pray to God that war would not descend on the unfortunate country of Vietnam. "Our strength and our means of destruction were powerful enough to erase the very name of the Empire of Annam from the map of the world, the day we arrived as enemies in Cochinchina." Montigny then told Đào Trí about the recently-concluded Crimean War, claiming that France was able to field 200,000 men with 1,200 artilleries on the enemy shores. Montigny told Đào Trí that he came to Danang government house only accompanied by his assistant Godeaux and his interpreter Pellerin because he did not fear the Vietnamese who, according to Montigny, were of no match for the French military. Lastly, Montigny threatened that, if Đào Trí did not accept the treaty, Đào Trí would be "the first victim of the consequences of your action."

Montigny stated that because the Vietnamese plenipotentiary kept repeating the phrase "If you want war, let's fight", Montigny had to prematurely terminate the meeting on that day. According to Montigny, four other Vietnamese plenipotentiaries did not agree with assertive stance of the chief Vietnamese negotiator. Đào Trí told Montigny that, if the treaty was concluded, the treaty would be brought to be signed by the Vietnamese Emperor at Huế himself. Montigny gave a translated note to the Vietnamese plenipotentiaries that they have twenty-four hours to decide whether to send this ultimatum to the Vietnamese Emperor requesting the Emperor to empower the plenipotentiaries with full credentials or else the Vietnamese would not have to deal with Montigny anymore but instead deal with Commodore Collier and warship Capricieuse, who would attack and disarm the Vietnamese coastal forts again.

=== Montigny's failed negotiation with Vietnam ===
Commodore Collier, who had been maintaining amicable relations with the Vietnamese, disagreed with Montigny's tough stance and saw Montigny's ultimatum as unnecessary. Collier sent Bishop Pellerin to withdraw Montigny's threatening letter from Danang. Vietnamese Emperor himself signing the treaty would bypass the problem of the powers of the plenipotentiaries. Next day, on February 1st, 1857, A Vietnamese interpreter came on board the Marceau to tell Montigny that the Vietnamese Emperor would sign the treaty himself. Montigny was delighted at this news and told the Vietnamese that this stance allowed Montigny to resume negotiations. Through the interpreter, Montigny requested a formal audience with Đào Trí, during which Montigny would present the whole mission including Collier. Montigny then instructed the Vietnamese how to formally receive an envoy, that was, all the presenting Vietnamese officials should be in full formal attire, the Danang fort should fire gun salute to honor Montigny and the Capricieuse would reciprocate with similar salute cannon shots.

On February 1st, 1857, after exchange of gun salute, Montigny, Godeaux, Pellerin and Collier set sail with a small vessel from the warships to the Danang fort. As Montigny approached Danang, a Vietnamese messenger rowed a boat to inform Montigny that the Vietnamese officials could not receive the French Mission in ceremonial attires because they did not have them. Given his experiences in China, Montigny believed that the Vietnamese officials in disheveled robes receiving French dignitaries was a way to humiliate the French.

Upon arrival in Danang, Đào Trí and the Vietnamese plenipotentiaries received Montigny and his retinue with pomp ceremonies and a large number of troops but not in ceremonial dresses. During the event, Montigny glimpsed the ceremonial attire beneath the outer garment of the second Vietnamese plenipotentiary. Montigny then understood that the Vietnamese officials deliberately wore usual dresses on top of the ceremonial ones. Montigny retaliated by expressing his displeasure that the Vietnamese plenipotentiaries received him in normal clothes not in ceremonial robes. Đào Trí apologized to Montigny for misunderstanding, saying that the Vietnamese messenger he had earlier sent to Montigny had failed to tell Montigny the reason why the Vietnamese did not wear ceremonial robes. Montigny said he would not believe Đào Trí until the responsible messenger was punished immediately. At once, the Vietnamese messenger was pinned down on the floor, beaten with fifty lashes in front of Montigny. Only when Montigny declared that he was satisfied that the beating on the messenger stopped.

After this Vietnamese reception, next day, on February 2nd, Montigny the French plenipotentiary began negotiation with his Vietnamese counterparts. Montigny assumed the same negotiating tactic as he had been in Siam. Montigny presented his own translated treaty draft to the Vietnamese, assigning them to read and study it and Montigny would come to receive their opinions and counter-proposals next day

Next day, on 3 February 1857, Đào Trí presented his own version of treaty draft, which began with an assertive preamble: "The Emperor of the French having humbly begged the Great Emperor of Annam to make peace. The latter, taking pity on him, was kind enough to grant him this favor." Montigny found this preamble unacceptable and became furious, saying aloud that the French Emperor had been generous to send an envoy to negotiate a treaty instead of punishing Vietnam for insulting French nationality. Đào Trí continued to read his treaty proposal, which asserted that the French should not "sell opium and abduct girls", to which Montigny replied with fury that, unlike the British, the French did not sell opium and abduction of girls had been a grave criminal offense in France.

Another article in Đào Trí's treaty proposal was that the incoming French merchants could only sell their merchandises to the Vietnamese Emperor, which could be paraphrased into the Vietnamese Emperor holding trade monopoly over the French. Montigny found this proposal not acceptable as the Westerners were dismantling traditional monopolies everywhere in Asia. Montigny pointed out that Vietnamese imperial monopoly was "devoid of all reasons and justice," invoking the principle of "free trade". Đào Trí proposed further that French merchant vessels could only come to trade at Danang and could only stay for four to five months, to which Montigny countered that the French should be allowed to trade, buy land and build churches in any Vietnamese seaports in Northern, Central and Southern Vietnam. Đào Trí insisted that he could only allow the French to trade in Danang and to reside only for some months but if the French behaved well they might be granted more rights.

The negotiation broke down at this point as both Montigny and Đào Trí, representing France and Vietnam, respectively, refused to compromise their proposed terms. Đào Trí asserted that he could not concede more than he had proposed and Montigny countered that the Emperor should empower someone who can accept his proposals. Montigny said that Vietnam's persistent refusal to accept French terms would result in "the most dangerous consequences". Đào Trí replied that he was assigned only to make peace with France and Montigny's proposals went too far in the terms – the matters that should be discussed with the Emperor first. Đào Trí also reminded Montigny that if France wanted to fight, Vietnam would fight. Enraged by Đào Trí's defiance, Montigny threatened to bring French warship to Huế, to which Đào Trí taunted that the French could go to Huế if they wanted because the Vietnamese would be there to 'receive' the French warships. Lastly, Đào Trí insisted that, as he had been appointed by Emperor Tự Đức to make peace with France, his signature alone was sufficient to make a treaty.

Facing Vietnamese resistance and realizing that his any further attempts to haggle would be futile, Montigny gave up. Montigny declared that Vietnam had rejected French proposal to conclude a friendship treaty and would hold the five Vietnamese plenipotentiaries responsible for any consequences Vietnam was going to face. Montigny gave his treaty draft, which contained twenty-eight articles, to the Vietnamese to consider presenting it to Emperor Tự Đức. Montigny's fifteen days of forceful and futile attempt to coerce Vietnam to accept an unequal treaty with France thus ended anticlimactically.

Contents of Montigny's proposed Franco–Vietnamese Treaty were essentially the same as the preceding France–Siamese Treaty, which included establishment of French extraterritorial and consular jurisdiction in Vietnam, stipulation of low three-percent import duty and freedom of Christianity in Vietnam. Most outstanding clauses were the Article 4, which stipulated that all the past Vietnamese Christian persecution edicts be repealed, any punishments on Christian practice be removed from Vietnamese law and the Article 5, in which Roman Catholicism became one of Vietnam's state religion.

=== Montigny's departure from Danang ===
Montigny's negotiation with the Vietnamese plenipotentiaries on 3 February 1857 ended in total failure as he did not manage to force the Vietnamese to accept his treaty proposals. Đào Trí gifted three oxen, one ounce of gold and one hundred chains of Vietnamese sapèque coins to Montigny, who refused the gifts out of gratitude. According to Montigny, about his overall experience in Vietnam, the Vietnamese were courteous and had received Montigny with pomp ceremonies. The only point was that the Vietnamese did not accept his treaty. Montigny spent the next two days reflecting and preparing for departure. Montigny stated that the Vietnamese, with sincerity, wanted to make a treaty with France but they were willing to do so only on their own terms. A military force was required to awaken the Vietnamese to see what had been going on in the world around them.

On 6 February 1857, all communications with the Vietnamese had ceased for two days, Montigny sent the last note threatening the Vietnamese that their refusal to accept his treaty proposal would have detrimental consequences, while also comically telling that he would leave Vietnam alone for now and urging the Vietnamese to treat the French right. Montigny asserted that if Vietnam continued to persecute Christians, France would be obliged to take actions. Montigny also told the Vietnamese in the note that he would go to Singapore to wait for further instructions from the French government;

He [Montigny] decided, after further consultation with His Excellency the Commodore [Collier], Commander of the French forces in Cochinchina, that he would go to Singapore to inform the Government of His August Sovereign of Cochinchina's refusal to contract with His August Sovereign a solemn treaty of friendship, commerce, navigation and religion, on basis and according to the official forms observed among all nations of the civilized world.

That, desiring to avoid any unnecessary act of hostility before receiving new orders from the Government of His Majesty, His Excellency the Commodore decided that he would leave the coastal forts, their artillery, and the other forts of Tourane in their present state.

As a consequence of this entirely friendly conduct, the undersigned [Montigny] warns the Annamese government that if, from this moment, religious persecution does not cease and there are further executions for the sole reason of practicing the religion of France, when he or any other plenipotentiary presents himself in Hué with new powers and the necessary means to obtain an honorable treaty, these acts of hostility will naturally place the Government of His Imperial Majesty under the obligation to take more energetic measures.

That if, between now and the return of the Plenipotentiary, French merchant vessels or inhabitants of this great Empire should present themselves at any point in the Empire of Annam and not receive all the assistance and good treatment due to a great nation, the Cochinchinese government will bear sole responsibility for any reprisals resulting from these new insults.

These last threats of Montigny, however, did not seem to incite fear nor compliance on the Vietnamese side. Bishop François Pellerin the Apostolic Vicar of Northern Cochinchina, who had taken refuge from Vietnamese persecution with Montigny, Bishop Jean-Claude Miche the Apostolic Vicar of Cambodia, who had accompanied Montigny from Kampot, Cambodia and Father Fontaine, who had earlier delivered Montigny's letter at Thuận An, were horrified at Montigny's failure to force Vietnam to adopt tolerance on Christians and at what would subsequently happen on the Christians in Vietnam. Bishop Pellerin, Bishop Miche and Father Fontaine jointly asked Montigny to retract the Articles 4, 5, 6 and 7, which concerned Christianity, from Montigny's draft treaty that would be sent to the Vietnamese imperial court, for fear that the Vietnamese Emperor would be further enraged by such proposals. The French priests also deplored Montigny to relay the issue of safety of the Christians in Vietnam to Emperor Napoleon III;

We must not hide it from you, Monsieur Plenipotentiary, the failure of your mission, due to the small number of forces accompanying you, will leave us in a more deplorable and far more dangerous position than the one we were in before. You must understand this, since you have encountered here all the customs of China, certainly with more pride and cruelty, and the Annamite Government will not fail to repeat the day after your departure what it has often said; that France is not powerful enough to impose a treaty on it, that you were afraid and fled.

We, therefore, have no other recourse than the generous and glorious devotion of His Majesty the Emperor and his Government to the Catholic Religion and its missionaries. But, if the aid we expect were to come, if this is delayed, some forty poor missionaries, your compatriots, and nearly six hundred thousand Christians would be exposed to almost certain massacre, as a result of the failure of today's attempt.

Charles de Montigny the French imperial plenipotentiary, along with his family, left Danang on the Marceau on 7 February 1857, along with the three French priests Bishop Pellerin, Bishop Miche, Father Fontaine, his assistant Godeaux and Commodore Jules Collier of the Capricieuse, which also left Danang, thus ending Montigny's seven-month diplomatic mission to Siam, Cambodia and Vietnam, seven months after his arrival in Siam on 9 July 1856. Failure of Montigny's mission in Vietnam was usually blamed on Montigny's adoption of coercive tactic in similar manner to his dealings with the Chinese in Shanghai but the lack of clear direction and policy of the French imperial government also contributed. The Vietnamese considered Montigny's mission in Danang to be a trivial event, recorded in a few sentences in the Đại Nam thực lục, in which Montigny's name was not even mentioned, in contrast to Le Lieur and Collier, whose names appeared in Vietnamese records.

Montigny was excessively emboldened by his success in Siam, which he believed was the result of his own work. However, Montigny's success in Siam was built on the preceding efforts of the British, who had honed Siam, which used to be a seclusive polity, for three decades since the 1820s, turning Siam into a Western-friendly nation. Indigenous developments also contributed to the outcome as Siam under King Mongkut was particularly open to Westerners. In contrast, no Western nations had ever managed to humble Vietnam, who would not be swayed by a peaceful diplomatic mission with small display of forces, up until that time. Misdirected objective from the French government doomed Montigny's mission from the start. The French would very soon abandon notion of peaceful approach in favor of active military invasion on Vietnam.

== Aftermath and Consequences ==
=== Reflection on Montigny's Mission ===
Charles de Montigny the French imperial plenipotentiary, on the French steam corvette Marceau, who had completed his diplomatic mission to the Southeast Asian nations of Siam, Cambodia and Vietnam, arrived in British Hong Kong in mid-February 1857, along with his family, his entourage including the three French missionaries Bishop François Pellerin from Vietnam, Bishop Jean-Claude Miche of Cambodia and Father Charles Fontaine. His assistant Ernest-Napoléon Godeaux had brought the gilded royal letter from the Siamese king Mongkut and Montigny's France–Siamese Treaty earlier concluded in August 1856 to Paris. This treaty, which was Montigny's only success in his whole mission, was quickly approved by the French government in February 1857. Alphonse de Bourboulon the French Minister in China, who had been on leave to France since 1854, returned to China, also reaching Hong Kong a few days after Montigny. Montigny had earlier offended his superior Bourboulon by securing the Southeast Asian Mission for himself. In Hong Kong, Bourboulon learned of Montigny's disastrous failure in Vietnam and interviewed Commodore Jules Collier the commander of the Capricieuse for the account of Montigny's failure.

Montigny and the two French priests Miche and Fontaine soon left Hong Kong for Singapore, where Montigny waited for further instructions from the French government on the Vietnamese issue. At first, Montigny did not realize the gravity of his failure to obtain Christian toleration in Vietnam. Alphonse de Bourboulon, Montigny's superior and rival, reported to Count Colonna-Walewski the French Foreign Minister about the outcome of Montigny's mission in Vietnam and told Walewski that peaceful approach on Vietnam was not possible anymore. At Singapore, on 14 March 1857, Montigny himself wrote to Walewski that "If I have not succeeded this time in negotiating a treaty with the Empire of Annam due to lack of means of action, my mission to this country will nevertheless not be in vain." Five days later, on March 19, realizing the gravity of his failure, Montigny wrote another letter to Walewski to defend himself by pointing out the causes of the failure of his mission;

- Montigny did not have sufficient naval forces to impose substantial pressure on the Vietnamese imperial court, especially after the premature withdrawal of the Catinat back to Macau.
- Montigny's power as the head of the mission had been limited.
- Captain Le Lieur had acted with excessive use of force by attacking Danang in September 1856 without any approvals, causing the Vietnamese to turn hostile towards the French; "These premature acts placed us in Cochinchina on a path of coercion and consequently of hostilities."

Sir John Bowring's push for the Arrow Incident to exaggerate into broad Second Opium War was supported by the Whigs including Lord Palmerston the British Prime Minister and Lord Clarendon the Secretary of State. The Liberals, however, managed to pass the vote of censure on Palmerston's government in March 1857, accusing Bowring of provoking an unjustified war with China, leading to Palmerston dissolving the Parliament and the general election of 1857. Even though the Whigs emerged from the election with majority, they saw Bowring as too scandalous. Lord Clarendon relieved Sir John Bowring from the position of Minister Plenipotentiary in China, replacing Bowring with James Bruce, 8th Earl of Elgin. Bowring continued to be the Governor of Hong Kong.

Also in Singapore, Montigny learned of another shocking news with the arrival of the letter of Arsène Hestrest telling Montigny about refusal of King Ang Duong of Cambodia to accept Montigny's treaty draft. In the letter, Hestrest told Montigny about the presence of Siamese officials during his presentation of Montigny's treaty to Ang Duong back in November 1856. Enraged, Montigny assumed that Siam had sent officials to prevent the Cambodian king from signing his proposed treaty. On 26 March 1857, Montigny wrote a long letter to Mongkut, confronting the Siamese king Mongkut about the incident. In the letter, Montigny recounted how the Siamese prince Kromma Luang Wongsa, younger half-brother of Mongkut, asked Commodore Collier to take nine Cambodians on board the Capricieuse to Cambodia but Siamese officials were sneaked among these Cambodians;

Upon arriving in Cambodia, one of these nine Cambodians, as soon as he set foot on land, behaved in such an extraordinary and inappropriate manner towards me, surrounding me with a surveillance that only respect prevents me from describing more accurately. His questions became so indiscreet, so impertinent even, that I was finally obliged to summon him. I recognized him immediately; I had seen Prince Kroma-Louang several times at His Royal Highness's residence. This so-called Cambodian, who did not even know the Cambodian language, was a Siamese, a subject of Your Majesty, an Agent, sent, as he himself confessed to me, to watch over me and inform my actions in Cambodia. I severely reproached this man for the extreme impropriety of his conduct towards the official Representative of France.

Montigny asserted that the Siamese spy official had perpetrated the offense of false declaration of nationality. In the letter, Montigny did not blame the Siamese king and the Siamese ministers directly, saying that the incident was due to "indiscreet zeal of some subordinate officials" but such conduct of the Siamese agent, he believed, was the cause of his failure in Cambodia. Montigny recalled that he had made the Siamese government and the Siamese king perfectly informed about his mission in Cambodia and he had been recognizing Siam as the rightful suzerain over Cambodia. Furthermore, Montigny stated that the terms of his proposed Cambodian Treaty were mostly the same as the Siamese Treaty concluded in August 1856 and Cambodia's acceptance of such treaty would not compromise Siam's sovereignty over Cambodia. Lastly, Montigny blamed the Siamese official Luang-phay (Luang Aphaiphitak, son of governor of Battambang) from Battambang as threatening Ang Duong to reject the treaty. Montigny accused Luang Aphaiphitak of forcing the Catholics in Battambang to partake in Buddhist ceremonies.

=== French offensive preparations on China and Vietnam ===
After Montigny's departure from Danang, the Vietnamese Emperor Tự Đức commissioned Đào Trí the Commander Defending against the West to strengthen Danang and Sơn Trà forts in anticipation of the return of French attack. Earlier, in January 1857, a French missionary Évariste Régis Huc had told the French Emperor Napoleon III that the Franco–Cochinchinese Treaty of Versailles of 1787, in which King Louis XVI promised military aid to Nguyễn Phúc Ánh, could provide legal basis for French occupation of the Vietnamese seaport of Tourane or Danang. Emperor Napoleon III had assigned Pierre Cintrat the archives keeper to examine Huc's claim. In March 1857, Cintrat reported to Napoleon that such Versailles Treaty of 1787 could not be the legal basis of French acquisition of Tourane because the pre-revolutionary government of Louis XVI had sent a secret order to abrogate the treaty, causing Bishop Pigneau de Béhaine to privately raise his own forces to help Nguyễn Ánh.

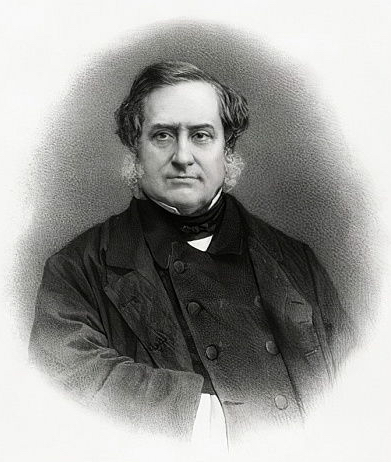
Baron Brénier de Renaudière was appointed by Emperor Napoleon III in April 1857 as the head of the committee to find a pretext for French military intervention in Vietnam.

For China, even though the French initially found the British casus belli of the Arrow Incident unjustified, they soon realized that the situation had gone too far and decided to join the British to extract concessions from China, utilizing the Chapdelaine Incident happened a year earlier as their own casus belli. In April 1857, Walewski instructed Alphonse de Bourboulon the French Minister to China in Macau to cooperate with the British in the war against China. For Vietnam, undeterred by Cintrat's report, the French Emperor Napoleon III was determined to gain possession of Tourane. On 7 April 1857, Emperor Napoleon III established a committee headed by Baron Brénier de Renaudière to find a pretext for French military intervention in Vietnam. Other members of the committee included Walewski himself and Admiral Ferdinand-Alphonse Hamelin the Minister of Marines.

As Britain had appointed Lord Elgin as the diplomatic head in the War with China, France, again, would not be left behind. As Lord Elgin had departed from Britain with naval forces to China, French government assigned Rear Admiral Charles Rigault de Genouilly in early April 1857 to lead French naval forces to China and to succeed Rear Admiral Guérin as the commander of French naval forces in the China Seas. De Genouilly was second-in-command in Lapierre's bombardment of Danang in 1847 and later suffered from humiliating shipwrecks of the French frigates Gloire and Victorieuse in Korean waters. In late April 1857, the French government appointed Baron Jean-Baptiste-Louis Gros as French Ambassador Extraordinary to China. The French were eager to join the British in order to secure the same concessions from China as the British. De Genouilly caught up with Lord Elgin in Singapore in May 1857. However, the Indian Rebellion, which began in May 1857, put the British offensive plan on China in jeopardy, stalling the joint Anglo–French attack on China for many months.

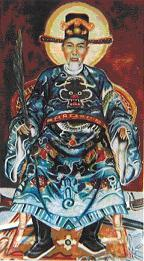
Michael Hồ Đình Hy, a Vietnamese Christian official, was executed and martyred on 22 May 1857 in Huế.

Tự Đức's persecution of Christians in Vietnam intensified in May 1857. On 22 May 1857, Bishop José María Díaz of Plataea the Apostolic Vicar of Central Tonkin from the Spanish Dominican Order was arrested by the Vietnamese authorities in Nam Định in Northern Vietnam. On May 25, Vietnamese ministers made a proposal to the Vietnamese Emperor Tự Đức, citing that the three enemies of Vietnam; the native Vietnamese Christians, the Cambodians and the Western barbarians, should be contained. "To abolish the Christian religion and spread good doctrine [Confucianism], a redoubled effort must be made against the Christians with severity to make them renounce their errors." For the European barbarians, coastal fortresses should be strengthened against their attacks;

These barbarians go into all kingdoms without fearing any fatigue. They sounded out the peoples without regretting any expenses. What is their intention in this, if not to seize the countries that receive them and infect them with their depraved doctrine? This is the sole aim of all their schemes. It is therefore unwise to allow them to establish themselves in our country. On the contrary, their entry must be strictly forbidden...

...Recently they came to the bay of Tourane with ships. They pretended to ask for freedom of trade but, in reality, it was a way to surreptitiously spread their monstrous errors, which they desired. They cared little for trade, but under this specific pretext, they want to ease to break the laws of the kingdom...

...What is to be done? Give them battle? Our soldiers will be crushed without any good results. Submit to them without offering the slightest resistance? That is entirely unsuitable. Therefore, we must not make peace with them, nor we must give them battle, but remain on the defensive, and for this, surround ourselves with difficulties and perils, this is what suits us best...

In late May 1857, Napoleon's committee of finding a reason to invade Vietnam reported to the French Emperor that, even though the 1787 Versailles Treaty could not provide legality, Vietnam's brutal persecution of Christians alone justified French invasion of Vietnam. Moreover, the committee found that Nguyễn Phúc Ánh and the whole Nguyen dynasty were not legitimate sovereigns but rather "Mayors of the Palace" of the Le dynasty, comparing the Nguyen Lords to the Japanese shoguns. Bishop François Pellerin the Apostolic Vicar of Northern Cochinchina, who had previously escaped Vietnamese persecution and sought refuge with Montigny, was dissatisfied at Montigny's failure in Vietnam. Also in late May 1857, Pellerin personally wrote to Baron Brénier the head of the French imperial committee on Vietnam that, due to Montigny's failure, he could not return to his mission in Vietnam without being cut into pieces, that he had no choices but to "throw myself at the feet of His Majesty the Emperor [Napoleon III] to beg him to have pity on our poor missions".

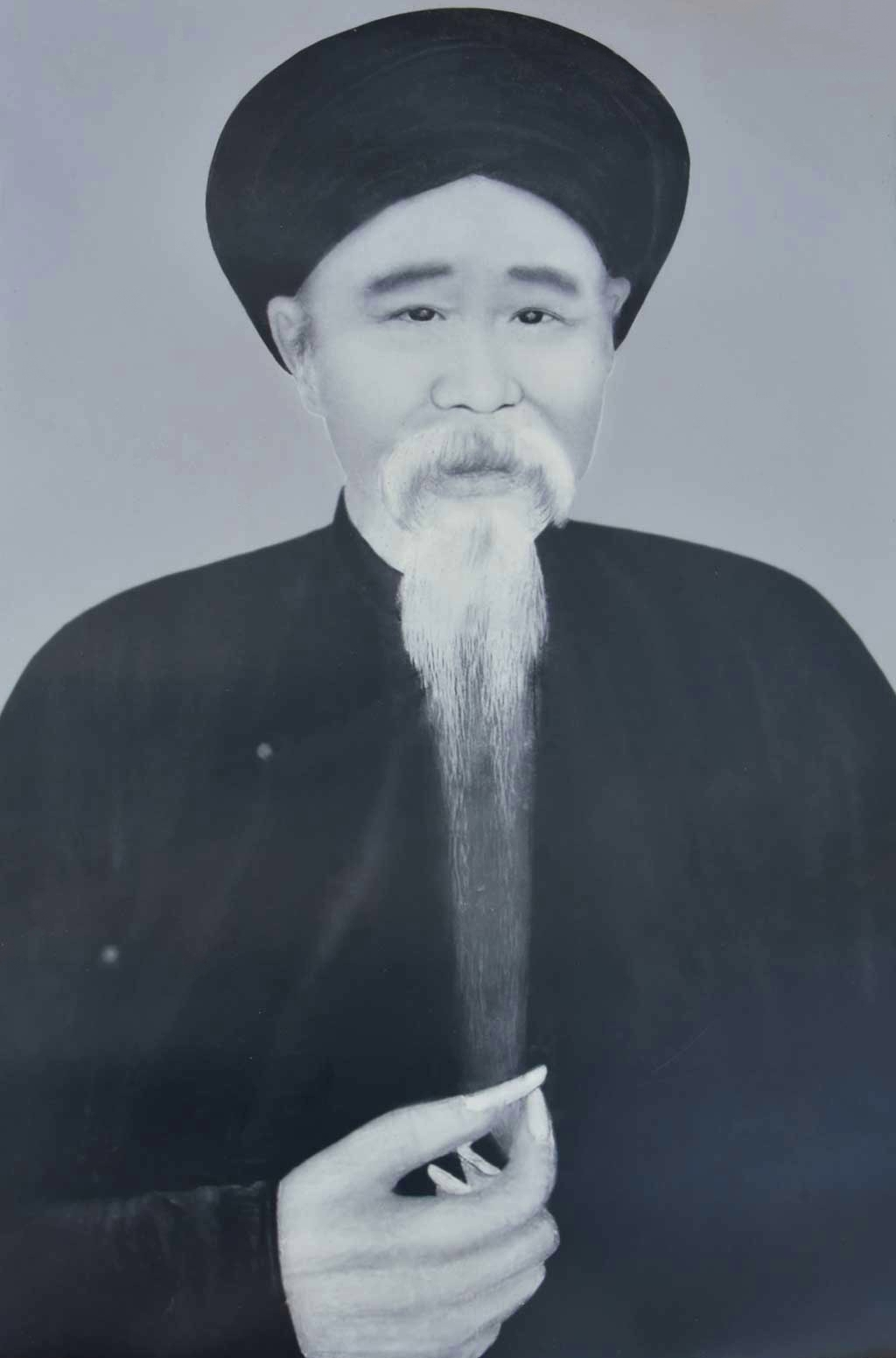
Trương Đăng Quế, de facto Chief Minister of Vietnam, had been in power since the reign of Minh Mạng and was instrumental in bringing Tự Đức to become Emperor.

In June 1857, Emperor Tự Đức issued an edict forcing Vietnamese Christians to conduct weddings and funerals in accordance with traditional Confucian rituals not in Christian rites, citing that four-tenths of the population of Vietnam had become Christians. Bishop Pellerin further informed Baron Brénier that Trương Đăng Quế the Vietnamese Prime Minister, who had been in power since the reign of Minh Mạng, called Long-koué, who was also instrumental to ascension of Tự Đức, was the chief instigator of Vietnamese persecutions on Christians. Pellerin persuaded Baron Brénier that the attack of Lapierre on Danang ten years prior in 1847 had made the Vietnamese court fear and tone down the persecutions, allowing some breathing room for Christians until recent failure of Montigny. Rear Admiral De Genouilly, remembering his humiliation in the Gloire and Victorieuse incident with Lapierre near Korea in 1847, however, considered the missionaries to be meddling and misleading France to a false hope of easy conquest on Vietnam;

I have heard that the French missionaries in Cochinchina are stirring things up in Paris to organize an expedition aganst the Annamite kingdom. It is the missionaries' custom to portray everything as easy, and it is by this method that they launched Monsieur Lapierre into an expedition that has no other results than to cover us in ridicule.

De Genouilly asserted that, in order to attack Vietnam, not only naval forces but land forces were required; at least 1,000 French marines, two artillery companies and one engineering company were needed to take Tourane, its forts and to occupy everything until the Hue government capitulated.

=== Montigny's attempt to salvage his Cambodian Treaty ===
Montigny in Singapore, still waiting for instructions from the French government and hoping to salvage his Cambodian treaty, wrote letters to Bishop Jean-Baptiste Pallegoix the Apostolic Vicar of Eastern Siam and Father Louis Larnaudie, two influential French priests in Bangkok, asking them to persuade the Siamese king Mongkut to allow his vassal King Ang Duong of Cambodia to accept Montigny's treaty or else the upcoming French military intervention in Vietnam would affect Cambodia. After receiving Montigny's letter accusing Siam of preventing Cambodia from concluding a treaty with France, Siam sought to explain to Montigny that Montigny's assumption was a misunderstanding. King Mongkut granted permission for Cambodia to make a treaty with France, which he had granted before and summoned Phraya Aphaiphubet Nong the Siam-appointed governor of Battambang to Bangkok to reprimand him to treat the Christians right, in the same manner as in Bangkok, not to force Christians in Battambang to partake in Buddhist ceremonies.

Montigny came to interpret Siamese sovereignty over Cambodia as "jealousy". Montigny wrote to Walewski again on May 8, defending his failure in Cambodia, saying that "An extraordinary event in the 19th century, the jealousy of a suzerain towards his vassal came to, if not cause of failure, at least delay the resolution of our affairs in Cambodia", informing Walewski about Siam's tenacious hold on Cambodia from accepting the treaty and complaining that he had not been given a clear instruction on his Cambodian mission. Montigny dispatched Bishop Jean-Claude Miche the Apostolic Vicar of Cambodia, who had been with Montigny since their departure from Kampot in October 1856, to return to Cambodia with two copies of Montigny's Cambodian Treaty, a French-language one and a Khmer-language one, for Ang Duong to sign.

After seven months of absence, Bishop Miche eventually returned to Cambodia in mid-May 1857. Ang Duong had been anxiously waiting for the outcome of Montigny's mission in Vietnam. A three-hour heated argument ensued between Ang Duong and Bishop Miche, who pointed out to the Cambodian king the benefits of accepting Montigny's treaty, to which Ang Duong replied with his usual rhetoric "I understand all that but what do you want me to do? I have two masters here who always have their eyes fixed on me. They are my neighbors and France is faraway. If I take a step that displeases them, they will tighten their grip on me before France even knows it." Bishop Miche countered Ang Duong's innate fear of Siam and Vietnam that by placing the French in Koh Tral (Phú Quốc), the French would safeguard Cambodia at doorstep from Siam and Vietnam.

Bishop Miche urged Ang Duong that, if Ang Duong regarded himself as a true independent king, he should sign Montigny's treaty, or else Cambodia would be bound to the Franco–Siamese Treaty instead because Cambodia would be considered a part of Siam;

If the King of Siam is wrong to regard Your Majesty only as a provincial governor, the treaty made by Monsieur de Montigny at Bangkok should be binding here. If, on the contrary, as I have no doubt you are, a true king, you can, in that capacity, regulate your government's relations with foreign courts independently of the King of Siam and, should he seek to obstruct them, it is those very courts he would attack.

However, in spite of Bishop Miche's encouraging words, King Ang Duong of Cambodia had made up his mind not to enter into any relations with France without consent of Siam and Vietnam. Eventually, Miche realized the hopelessness of persuading Ang Duong to accept the treaty and wrote to Montigny on May 25 about Ang Duong's second refusal to accept Montigny's treaty, which practically terminated any French attempts to establish relations with Cambodia until 1863. Bishop Miche would not try to bring Cambodia into French protectorate again until six years later in 1863, when the French had already conquered Southern Vietnam, Bishop Miche went to Saigon asking for French protection to free Cambodia from Siamese domination. Bishop Miche then went to Battambang in 1857, where Nong the Battambang governor and his son Luang Aphai received Bishop Miche with courtesy, promising never to force Christians to partake in Buddhist ceremonies again.

=== Deterioration of Franco–Siamese relations ===
As Siam had signed a commercial treaty with France, Dominique Rémi, the French merchant from Shanghai, owner of Remi Schmidt & Co and a friend of Montigny, came to reside in Bangkok, renting a place for his company to trade. Rémi acted as Montigny's confidant in Bangkok. After waiting in Singapore for three months, the only instruction Montigny received from Walewski was that Montigny should return to resume consular responsibilities in Shanghai. Montigny left Singapore in early June 1857, reaching Shanghai on 7 June 1857, four years after his departure in June 1853. At Shanghai, Montigny discovered Mongkut's letter sent to him in January, telling Montigny about the birth of a Siamese prince. Rémi reported to Montigny that, since Siam had signed commercial treaties with Britain, France and the United States, hundreds of Western merchant vessels had come to trade in Bangkok, among them only six were French.

At the death of Charles Hillier the British Consul in Siam, the British sent William Raymond Gingell to be the acting Consul in Bangkok. The Siamese court, impressed by Queen Victoria's letter, received Consul Gingell with honor and pomp ceremonies. Earlier, Montigny had appointed António Frederico Moor the Portuguese Consul in Bangkok as the acting French Consul due to shortage of French diplomats in the Far East. However, the Siamese saw the Portuguese Consul Moor as a mere merchant from 'small nation' and interpreted Moor's appointment to French consular position as France not caring about Siam.

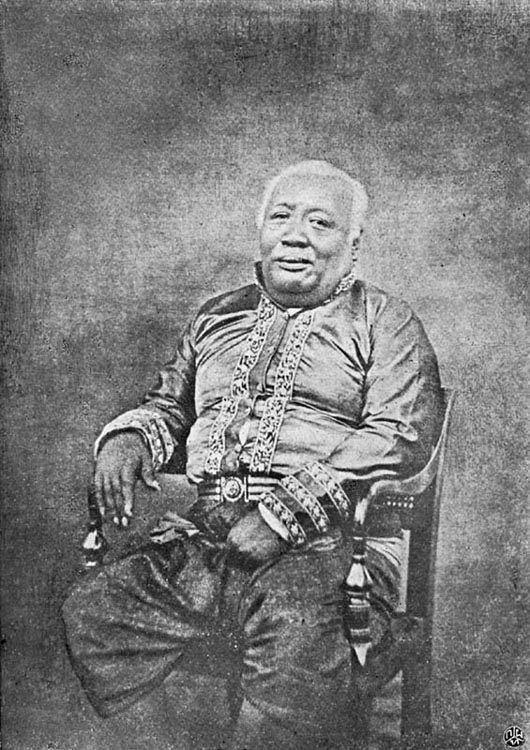
Prince Kromma Luang Wongsathirat Sanit, younger half-brother of King Mongkut, was the leading figure in conclusion of every Western unequal treaties in Mongkut's reign.

The French missionaries in Bangkok believed that Siam had truly been obstructing Cambodia from signing a treaty with France. Father Fontaine in Bangkok even suspected that the British were behind Siamese stance on Cambodia's relation with France. On 13 July 1857, the Siamese prince Kromma Luang Wongsa gathered all the French men in Bangkok including the French merchants Rémi, Catteaux and Dorlancourt, the French missionaries Pallegoix, Clémenceau, Larnaudie, Fontaine, etc and the Portuguese Consul Moor at his residence the Thonburi Palace, asking the French men in Bangkok to testify against Montigny's accusations, to which the French merchants and missionaries refused, saying that they were not accorded with any political power to do so.

King Mongkut had been planning to send Siamese diplomatic missions to Paris and London but Siam had to rely on Western steamships to transport the Siamese envoys to Europe. Even though Mongkut mentioned his plan to Montigny first in August 1856, the British did it first by sending a screw sloop HMS Encounter to bring the Siamese envoys to London, reaching Bangkok in July 1857. Mongkut appointed Phraya Montri Suriyawong Chum Bunnag, younger brother of Chuang Bunnag, as the Principal Envoy leading the Siamese diplomatic mission to London, which left Siam in July 1857 on the Encounter.

A few days later, on 15 July 1857, the French merchant ship Aigle brought the Franco–Siamese Montigny's Treaty, earlier concluded in August 1856, approved by the French government in February 1857, to Bangkok for ratification on Siamese side. As King Mongkut had sent his gilded royal letter to the French Emperor Napoleon III, expecting a response, France sending the treaty on a simple mail ship without response letter from the French Emperor, not even an official envoy, was an insult to the Siamese king. This incident put France in direct comparison to Britain, who had been closely attending to all of Siam's requests. Harry Parkes had earlier brought the Bowring Treaty from London to Bangkok for ratification in March 1856 with Queen Victoria's letter and Siam expected France to do the same.

When the Portuguese Consul Moor presented the Franco–Siamese Treaty for the Siamese king Mongkut to ratify on 23 July 1857, Mongkut refused to ratify the treaty right away. This incident became an injury to Franco–Siamese relations and French prestige in the Siamese eyes. Prince Wongsa told the French merchant Rémi that France had humiliated Siam as the Siamese interpreted this outcome as the French Emperor neglecting Mongkut's letter. Rémi quickly reported this incident to Montigny in Shanghai. On July 24, Phrakhlang Kham Bunnag the Siamese Foreign Minister wrote a letter to Montigny, explaining that the reason of Ang Duong's refusal to accept Montigny's treaty was that Cambodia had been a small nation that feared Vietnam and that Montigny's accusation of Siam preventing Cambodia from signing the treaty was not true. Kham Bunnag asked Abbé Larnaudie to translate the letter into French to send to Montigny, which Larnaudie did so reluctantly. King Mongkut eventually ratified Montigny's Treaty on 24 August 1857 anyway.

Montigny sent the complaints of French merchants in Siam to Walewski on August 24; "Our interests and influence are in grave peril in Siam." Montigny informed Walewski that the Siamese thought France scorned them because France had sent the treaty on a mere mail ship without an imperial letter. The British and the Americans had done better in courting Siam's favor. Montigny also pointed out that France had commercial stake in Siam as, since signing of the treaty, French merchant ships from Bordeaux, Nantes, Le Havre and Marseilles had come to trade in Bangkok, never before had China seen so many French ships at one time. Lastly, Montigny deplored Walewski to have the French Emperor reply to Mongkut's letter or else the French trade in Siam would suffer. Walewski and the French government, however, were too preoccupied with the upcoming war in China and Vietnam to properly take care of the Siamese matter.

By August 1857, Montigny seemed to accept his failure in Cambodia and reconciled with Siam. Montigny in Shanghai wrote a reply letter to Mongkut on 30 August 1857, addressing the Siamese king as "His Majesty the King of Siam, Sovereign of Laos, Suzerain of Cambodia and part of the Malay Peninsula" (French: A Sa Majesté le Roi de Siam, souverain du Laos, suzerain du Cambodge et d'une partie de la presqu'ile Malaise), congratulating Mongkut on the birth of the Siamese prince and asking permission for his wife Madame de Montigny to send her own letter to congratulate.

In the letter, Montigny stated that, if he had known that Siam had sent officials with him, he would have them board with him on the Marceau and take a good care of them. Montigny urged Mongkut to forget this incident altogether, letting it pass and expressing his regret that Cambodia would remain a small country; "The consequences of the entire Cambodia affair seem easy to foresee. As the sovereign of this small country cannot reasonably sign a trade treaty with France and thus remains in a state of exclusion." For Mongkut's notion that Vietnam was a greater nation than Siam because none of the Western nations had ever managed to force any treaties on Vietnam, Montigny countered that Siam signing treaties with Western powers indeed preserved its independence by integration into world order; "On the contrary, I believe that, by establishing sound treaties with these [Western] powers, your states thereby enter into the general balance of power among European governments and receive from them, forevermore, the guarantee of their independence."

=== Decision of Emperor Napoleon III to invade Vietnam ===
The Spanish Bishop Díaz, the Apostolic Vicar of Central Tonkin, who had earlier been arrested in Nam Định in Northern Vietnam, was eventually executed by beheading and martyred on 20 July 1857. On 30 August 1857, Bishop Pellerin had an audience with Emperor Napoleon III at Biarritz, presenting a petition declaring that destruction of Christianity in Vietnam was at stake and deploring the French Emperor to intervene to save the missionaries and the Christians;

I beg Your Majesty to allow me to speak again about our poor neophytes in Cochinchina and the French missionaries in the Kingdom of Annam; their blood is flowing at this very moment and their condition has become even more appalling since France's latest attempt. If nothing is done for us now, it is to be feared that Christianity will be annihilated in these lands, which nevertheless seem so receptive to the benefits of the Christian religion and civilization.

Pellerin did not miss an opportunity to blame Montigny in his plead; "Monsieur de Montigny left the port of Tourane after suffering the most deplorable defeat, and it could not have been otherwise, given the resources at his disposal." Pellerin also persuaded that, if Emperor Napoleon decided to intervene in Vietnam, grace would come upon the Emperor and his dynasty; "What you do for us will bring down upon you and your august dynasty the blessings of God."

News of arrest of Bishop Díaz by Vietnamese authorities only reached Macau in late August 1857 and his death was not even known yet. Upon learning of Bishop Díaz's danger, the Spanish Consul General in Macau Nicasio Cañete y Moral came to ask Alphonse de Bourboulon the French Minister in China for help. Bourboulon immediately came up with a "humanitarian mission" to rescue Bishop Díaz from Vietnam, assigning on August 31;

- Count Michel-Alexandre Kleczkowski, who had formerly been Montigny's Chinese interpreter in Shanghai, then secretary of French legation in China, as the head of the mission
- Rear Admiral De Genouilly the commander of French naval forces in China assigned the French warship Catinat, the very same warship that had earlier bombarded Danang in September 1856, under the very same Captain Le Lieur de Ville-sur-Arce, as the transporting vessel for Count Kleczkowski. De Genouilly insisted to Le Lieur that this mission was to be absolutely peaceful.
- The Spanish Consul General Cañete y Moral also bought an American steamer Lily for the mission.

Next day, on September 1st, Bourboulon wrote a lengthy report to Walewski about a review of Franco–Vietnamese history prepared by Bishop Pierre-André Retord the Apostolic Vicar of Western Tonkin, asserting that Montigny's mission to Vietnam was doomed to fail and, in order for France to coerce Vietnam to French terms, France should attack and occupy some coastal lands of Vietnam.

Count Kleczkowski and Captain Le Lieur on the Catinat left Macau on 3 September 1857, along with the smaller steamer Lily. Upon their arrival in the Red River Delta in Northern Vietnam or Tonkin, on September 12, Kleczkowski was informed by the local Christians that Bishop Díaz had already been executed on July 20th. Nevertheless, Kleczkowski decided to continue his mission to survey the region. The mission reached Ba Lạt on September 16. Through the native Vietnamese Christians, Spanish Bishop Melchór García-Sampedro, coadjutor and successor to the late Bishop Díaz in Central Tonkin Vicariate, sent a Spanish priest to deliver a letter from Bishop Retord of Western Tonkin to Kleczkowski, providing insider information about Christian persecutions in Vietnam. Kleczkowski explored the Red River Estuary and, not intending to provoke any confrontations, left Ba Lạt on September 22 with Le Lieur, the Catinat and the Lily, ending his mission and going back, reaching Macau on 3 October 1857. Only then Bourboulon and the Spanish Consul learned of the execution of Bishop Díaz.

In his letter, Bishop Retord asserted that the missionaries in Vietnam had been hiding and suffering for twenty-six years since Minh Mạng's persecution edict of 1833 and that occasional visits of French warships in Danang could only subject the Christians to even more merciless fury. Retord urged the French imperial government to prove its own might by overthrowing the Nguyen dynasty and placing a descendant of the legitimate Le dynasty, referring to Tạ Văn Phụng in Tonkin, a Vietnamese Christian who claimed to be Lê Duy Minh, a surviving member of the Le dynasty, on the Vietnamese throne. Retord also claimed that the Tonkinese or Northern Vietnamese were waiting to be freed from Nguyen-dynasty rule and would join France. Bourboulon forwarded this fiery letter of Bishop Retord to the French government at Paris.

On the fateful day of 25 November 1857, Emperor Napoleon III decided to intervene in Vietnam, appointing Rear Admiral Rigault de Genouilly to take command of the campaign but the French attack on Vietnam would only commence after the conclusion of French war in China. News of execution of Bishop Díaz reached the Emperor on the same day. The campaign was to be overseen not by the Ministry of Foreign Affairs but instead by the Ministry of Marines, the French Navy, with Walewski providing instructions to Hamelin. Walewski also drafted a treaty for De Genouilly to enforce on Vietnam and insisted that De Genouilly should retain control of Tourane (Danang) in order to ensure compliance of the Vietnamese court. Lastly, Walewski assigned Marquis de Turgot the French Ambassador in Madrid to ask for cooperation from Spain.
