= Jean-Claude Miche =

French missionary and bishop

Jean-Claude Miche M.E.P.
- Bishop of Dansara
- See: Dansara
- Appointed: 13 June 1847
- In office: 1847–1873

Orders
- Ordination: 5 June 1830
- Consecration: 13 June 1847 by Dominique Lefèbvre
- Rank: Bishop

Personal details
- Born: 9 August 1805 Bruyères, Vosges, France
- Died: 1 December 1873 (aged 68) Saigon, Vietnam
- Buried: Paris Foreign Missions Society chapel, Rue du Bac, Paris, France
- Denomination: Catholic Church

Jean-Claude Miche M.E.P. (9 August 1805 – 1 December 1873) was a French missionary and bishop of the Catholic Church. He played an instrumental role in the establishment of the French Protectorate of Cambodia. Ordained in 1830, Miche entered the seminary of the Paris Foreign Missions Society (M.E.P.) in 1835. After a brief course on the geography of Southeast Asia, Miche departed for Cochinchina the next year. After sojourns in Malaysia, Siam, and the Mekong Delta, Miche arrived in Battambang in December 1838.

Miche was forced to leave about a year later, when Ang Em, a rebelling prince of Cambodia, declared himself king of Battambang, and the town was all but emptied of its inhabitants. He traveled up a tributary of the Ba River to the Central Highlands of Vietnam, hoping to convert the Montagnard people to the Catholic faith. Minh Mạng, the Emperor of Vietnam, who was opposed to missionaries, had him arrested. Minh Mạng's successor, Thiệu Trị, however, pardoned him in 1843 after an appeal by King Louis Philippe I of France. Miche continued his mission in Cambodia and Laos.

In 1856, under instructions from French diplomat Louis Charles de Montigny, Miche unsuccessfully petitioned King Ang Duong of Cambodia to accept French protection to free his country from the influence of Siam. Duong's death in 1860 triggered a political crisis when his successor Norodom's brothers, Sisowath and Si Votha, rebelled. Norodom was forced out of the country and into Siam. Miche, together with five French soldiers, organized an army that expelled the rebels. By around 1863–1864, Miche had secured Norodom's trust and Ernest Doudart de Lagrée, a French naval officer, convinced Norodom to allow the establishment of the French Protectorate of Cambodia. Miche continued his missionary activities in Indochina until his death in 1873 in Saigon.

== Early life and career ==
Jean-Claude Miche was born on 9 August 1805 in Bruyères, Vosges, France, the youngest of many siblings; he had four sisters and six brothers born from two marriages. The family, mostly farmers and artisans, had been living in the Vosges for a century. For Jean-Claude to take on a religious career was not typical of the family, although one of his brothers, Joseph-Victor, also became a priest.

After studying in Senaide, Jean-Claude Miche attended the seminary of Foucharupt in Saint-Dié-des-Vosges. He was ordained on 5 June 1830 in Saint-Dié-des-Vosges and was sent as a vicar to the parish in Moyenmoutier where his brother Joseph-Victor was the curate. Two years later, he was transferred to Fraize, where he remained until he entered the seminary of the Paris Foreign Missions Society (MEP) on 10 September 1835. The course was a brief one, providing him with basic geographical knowledge about his approximate posting, but not the language, which he was supposed to learn during the six-month sea voyage. Following tradition, Miche only learned the exact location of his mission, Cochinchina, during the sending off ceremony in the MEP chapel of the Rue du Bac. A few days later, on 27 February 1836, he departed on the mission.

== Arrival in Cochinchina ==
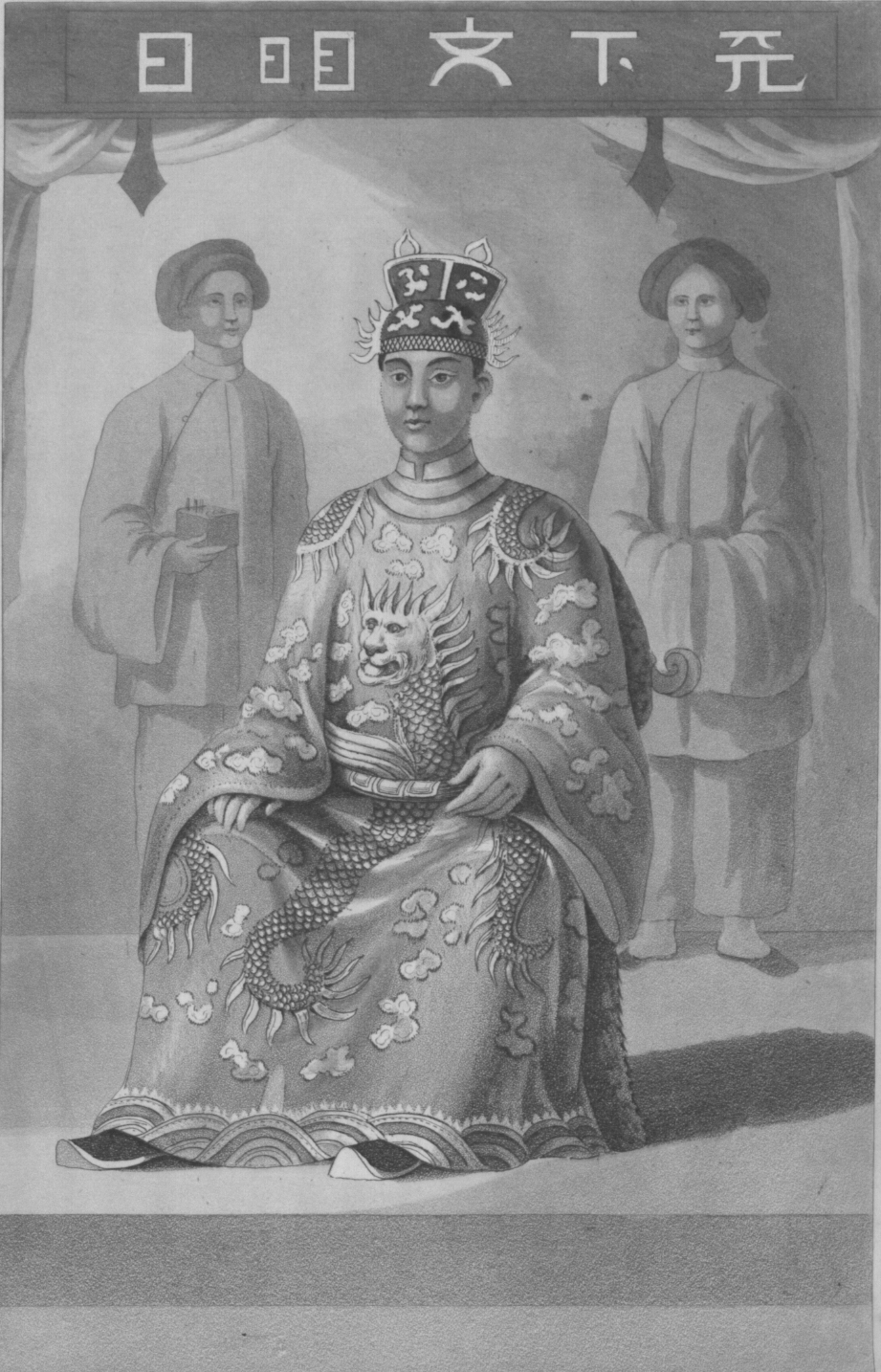
Emperor Minh Mạng of Vietnam

Miche could not proceed directly to Cochinchina because of the persecution of Christians there. After passing through Singapore, he reached the College General in Penang, Malaysia, and stayed there for a while. Arriving in the Mekong Delta later in 1836, Miche was assigned to the central and southern Vietnam mission. He was responsible for missionary work with the Cambodian, Lao, and Montagnard peoples. Afterwards, Miche moved to Bangkok in Siam, where he studied the Khmer language under Cambodian Christians who had fled persecution. In 1838, he finally moved into Cambodia, traveling with a fellow missionary, Pierre Duclos, to Paknam by boat and then through the jungle to Battambang on foot. They arrived in Battambang in time to celebrate Midnight Mass on 25 December 1838.

Miche and Duclos' time in Battambang among a congregation of mostly Chinese merchants and mixed-race descendants of Portuguese was cut short just a year later. Ang Em, a rebelling Cambodian prince, had declared himself king of Battambang. During the insurrection, the town was almost completely emptied of its inhabitants, prompting the two missionaries to leave in search of a new town for their work. On 7 January 1840, they left for Bangkok, arriving on 2 February 1841.

In early 1842, Miche and another priest traveled from central Vietnam up a tributary of the Ba River to the Central Highlands of Vietnam where the Montagnard people live, hoping to convert them to Christianity. Minh Mạng, the Emperor of Vietnam, was opposed to the introduction of Christianity and Vietnamese troops arrested the priests when they reached the first Montagnard villages. They were taken to Hue, spent time in many prisons, were tortured, and were sentenced to death. Minh Mạng's successor, Thiệu Trị, however, pardoned them on 19 March 1843 after an appeal by King Louis Philippe I of France. Miche left Vietnam on a French navy ship.

== Cambodia ==
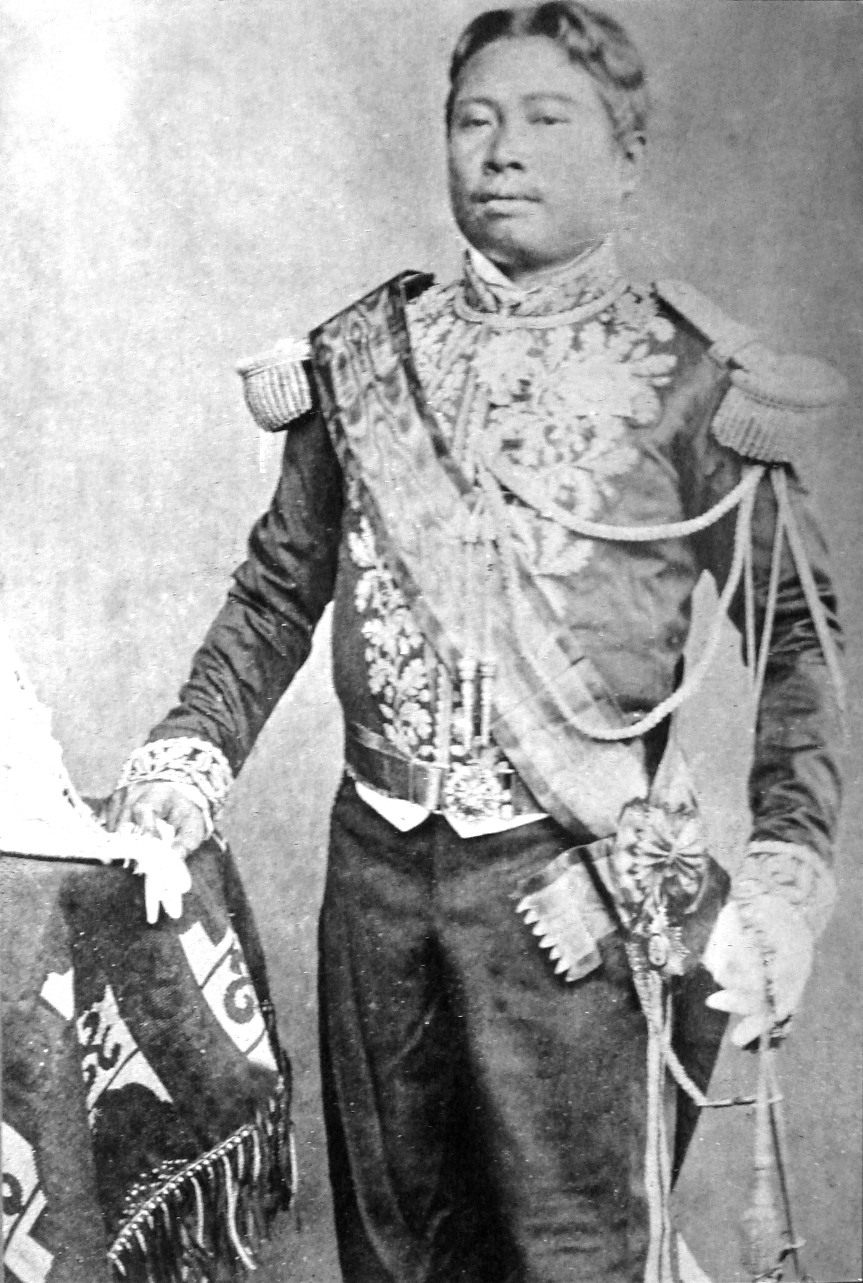
King Norodom of Cambodia

Miche continued his missionary activities, this time from near Phnom Penh in Cambodia. He was consecrated titular bishop of Dansara on 13 June 1847 by Dominique Lefèbvre. He was again tasked with evangelizing in Cambodia and Laos. In early 1849, Miche left for an excursion inland up the Mekong, but his boat was not fit for the conditions and he only reached Sambok in Cambodia.

In 1850, the Cambodian mission was separated from the southernmost Vietnam mission. Miche was appointed apostolic vicar of Cambodia and was now in charge of evangelizing Laos. The task continued to prove difficult. Although two missionaries had managed to settle among the Montagnards in 1850, the mission lacked resources. Miche again tried to travel inland, this time during the rainy season when the river was much more navigable. He hoped to visit and review the work of French priests who were living among the Stung Treng and learning to speak Lao. In July 1853, he reached the southern edge of the lands of the Lao people, but found them even less willing to convert than the Cambodians.

In 1854, Miche proposed a conference in Bangkok to concentrate evangelization efforts in Laos, but the political situation in the area was becoming tense and hampered his activities. In 1856, French diplomat Louis Charles de Montigny instructed Miche to petition King Ang Duong of Cambodia to accept French protection to free his country from the influence of Siam. Miche had drafted a letter requesting protectorate status for Duong to send to Emperor Napoleon III of France. Miche failed to persuade Duong to seek France's protection. Duong's death in 1860 triggered a political crisis in the kingdom. His son Norodom was elected king and his brothers, Sisowath and Si Votha, rebelled against him, forcing him to flee to Siam. Miche, together with five French soldiers, organized an army that expelled the rebels and allowed Norodom, with the help of French authorities, to return as king. By around 1863–1864, Miche had secured Norodom's trust and Ernest Doudart de Lagrée, a French naval officer, convinced Norodom to allow the establishment of the French Protectorate of Cambodia. Miche had become the most important of all missionaries in Cambodia.

== Later years and death ==
Miche spent the rest of his life engaged in missionary activities. He founded churches and schools in Indochina. He authored a Latin-Cambodian dictionary. A number of his letters chronicling his times were published in the Annales de la propagation de la foi (1863).

Miche died on 1 December 1873 in Saigon. His funeral three days later culminated in a procession of two hundred carriages to the tomb of Pierre Pigneau de Behaine, a famed French missionary, five kilometers outside of the city. Miche's remains were repatriated to France after the Indochina War and inhumed in the crypt of the MEP chapel on 29 April 1983.

Miche is recognized as an early European influence in the Indochina region and instrumental in the establishment of the French Protectorate of Cambodia. He was also an early Western observer of Buddhism in the region and made some unflattering remarks about that faith.
