= Bombardment of Tourane =

Bombardment of Tourane or Bombardment of Đà Nẵng may refer to:

- Bombardment of Tourane (1847)
- Bombardment of Tourane (1856)
- Siege of Tourane (1858–1860)
