= François de Chasseloup-Laubat =

French general and military engineer (1754–1833)

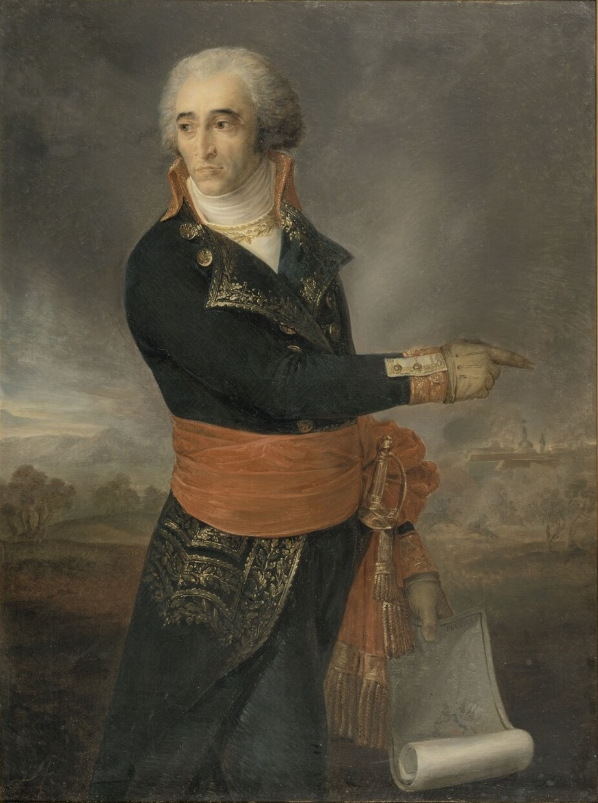
Portrait by Georges Rouget, 1838

François Charles Louis, marquis de Chasseloup-Laubat (French pronunciation: [fʁɑ̃swa ʃaʁl lwi maʁki də ʃaslu loba]; August 18, 1754 – October 3, 1833) was a French general and military engineer during the French Revolutionary and Napoleonic Wars.

== Biography ==
François de Chasseloup-Laubat was born at Saint-Sornin (Charente Inferieure), of a noble family, and entered the French engineers in 1774.

He was still a subaltern at the outbreak of the Revolution, becoming captain in 1791. His ability as a military engineer was recognized in the campaigns of 1792 and 1793. In the following year he won distinction in various actions and was promoted successively chef de bataillon and colonel. He was chief of engineers at the siege of Mainz in 1793, after which he was sent to Italy. He there commanded the positions and lines of advance of the army of Bonaparte. He was promoted brigadier-general before the close of the campaign, and was subsequently employed in fortifying the new Rhine frontier of France.

His work as chief of engineers in the army of Italy (1799) was conspicuously successful, and after the battle of Novi he was made general of division. When Napoleon took the field in 1800 to retrieve the disasters of 1799, he again selected Chasseloup as his engineer general. During the peace of 1801-1805 he was chiefly employed in reconstructing the defences of northern Italy, and in particular the afterwards famous Quadrilateral. His chef-d'œuvre was the great fortress of Alessandria on the Tanaro.

In 1805 he remained in Italy with André Masséna, but at the end of 1806 Napoleon, then engaged in the Polish campaign, called him to the Grande Armée, with which he served in the campaign of 1806–07, directing the sieges of Colberg, Danzig and Stralsund. During the Napoleonic domination in Germany, Chasseloup reconstructed many fortresses, in particular Magdeburg. In the campaign of 1809 he again served in Italy. In 1810 Napoleon made him a councillor of state. His last campaign was that of 1812 in Russia.

He retired from active service soon afterwards, though in 1814 he was occasionally engaged in the inspection and construction of fortifications. Louis XVIII made him a peer of France and a knight of St Louis. He refused to join Napoleon in the Hundred Days, but after the second Restoration he voted in the chamber of peers against the condemnation of Marshal Ney.

In politics he belonged to the constitutional party. The king created him a marquis. Chasseloup's later years were employed chiefly in putting in order his manuscripts, a task which he had to abandon owing to the failure of his sight. His only published work was Correspondance d'un général français, etc. sur divers sujets (Paris, 1801, republished Milan, 1805 and 1811, under the title Correspondance de deux générals, etc., essais sur quelques parties d'artillerie et de fortification). The most important of his papers are in manuscript in the Depot of Fortifications, Paris.

As an engineer Chasseloup was an adherent, though of advanced views, of the old bastioned system perfected by Vauban. He followed in many respects the engineer H.J.B. de Bousmard, whose Essai General de Fortification was published in 1797 and who fell, as a Prussian officer, in the defence of Danzig in 1807 against Chasseloup's own attack. His front as applied to Alessandria, contains many elaborations of the bastion trace, with, in particular, masked flanks in the tenaille, which served as extra flanks of the bastions. The bastion itself was carefully and minutely retrenched. The ordinary ravelin he replaced by a heavy casemated caponier after the example of Montalembert, and, like Bousmard's, his own ravelin was a large and powerful work pushed out beyond the glacis.

His wife, the daughter of François Fresneau de La Gataudière, brought him the Château de la Gataudière, at Marennes, Charente-Maritime; his youngest son, Prosper de Chasseloup-Laubat, was Minister of the Navy under Napoleon III.
