= Dominique Lefèbvre =

French missionary

Dominique Lefèbvre MEP
- Vicar Apostolic of Western Cochin
- Church: Catholic Church
- See: Apostolic Vicariate of Western Cochin
- In office: 11 March 1844 – 28 August 1864
- Predecessor: Vicariate erected
- Successor: Jean-Claude Miche
- Other post: Titular Bishop of Isauropolis (1839-1865)
- Previous post: Coadjutor Vicar Apostolic of Eastern Cochin (1839-1844)

Orders
- Ordination: 20 December 1834
- Consecration: 1 August 1841 by Étienne-Théodore Cuenot

Personal details
- Born: 1 August 1810 Courtonne-la-Meurdrac, Calvados, French Empire
- Died: 30 April 1865 (aged 54) Marseille, Bouches-du-Rhône, French Empire

Dominique Lefèbvre (1810–1865) was a French missionary of the Paris Foreign Missions Society to Vietnam and the bishop of the Apostolic Vicariate of Western Cochin and of the titular see Isauropolis, in partibus infidelium, during the 19th century. His two terms of imprisonment during the reign of Emperor Thiệu Trị were a pretext for the first French naval interventions in the country.

Having been ordained in December 1834, Fr. Dominique Lefèbvre arrived in Đại Nam in 1835. In 1839, Fr. Lefèbvre was appointed the Coadjutor Apostolic Vicar of Cochin and Titular Bishop of Isauropolis. He was consecrated on 1 August 1841 by Bishop Étienne-Théodore Cuenot of the Apostolic Vicariate of Cochin. This apostolic vicariate was subsequently reorganized into the Apostolic Vicariate of Eastern Cochin and the Apostolic Vicariate of Western Cochin by Pope Gregory XVI in March of 1844, and Bishop Dominique Lefèbvre was appointed the Apostolic Vicar of Western Cochin (Fr. Jean-Claude Miche was appointed the Coadjutor Apostolic Vicar simultaneously). The Apostolic Vicariate of Western Cochin would ultimately become the Archdiocese of Saigon.

At the time, it was illegal for missionaries to enter the country to proselytise. In 1845, Bishop Lefèbvre was condemned to death after being arrested at Cái Nhum in 1844 and then sent to Huế. The US Captain John Percival of the USS Constitution failed in his attempts to have him released, but managed to inform Admiral Jean-Baptiste Cécille who obtained his release.

Later Dominique Lefèbvre again re-entered Vietnam, and was again imprisoned. In 1847, Cécille sent two warships (Gloire and Victorieuse) under Captains Lapierre and Charles Rigault de Genouilly to Tourane (Danang) to obtain the liberation of two imprisoned French missionaries, Bishop Dominique Lefèbvre (imprisoned for a second time as he had re-entered Vietnam secretly) and Duclos, and freedom of worship for Catholics in Vietnam. As negotiations drew on without results, an incident named the Bombardment of Tourane erupted on 15 April 1847. Under the order of Thiệu Trị, six corvettes from Đại Nam ambuscaded the frigate Gloire and the corvette Victorieuse, which were sent to Tourane to negotiate for the liberation of the imprisoned French missionaries and to seek a commitment from the authorities in Đại Nam to allow freedom of worship for Catholics, in the Bay of Tourane. In the brief action that followed, the French sank four of Đại Nam's corvettes and disabled a fifth, and inflicted nearly 1,200 casualties on the outclassed Đại Nam's sailors. The French fleet then sailed away.

Bishop Lefèbvre was the principal consecrator of Bishop Jean-Claude Miche in the latter's episcopal ordination on 13 June 1847.

In 1863, Bishop Lefèbvre laid the cornerstone of the seminary at the location on Tôn Đức Thắng Boulevard where it still stands today.

Dominique Lefèbvre resigned and returned to France in 1864 due to health problems and died in Marseille in 1865.

== See also ==
- Tự Đức's Catholic persecution
- France-Vietnam relations
