= Tự Đức's Catholic persecution =

Anti-Christian persecution

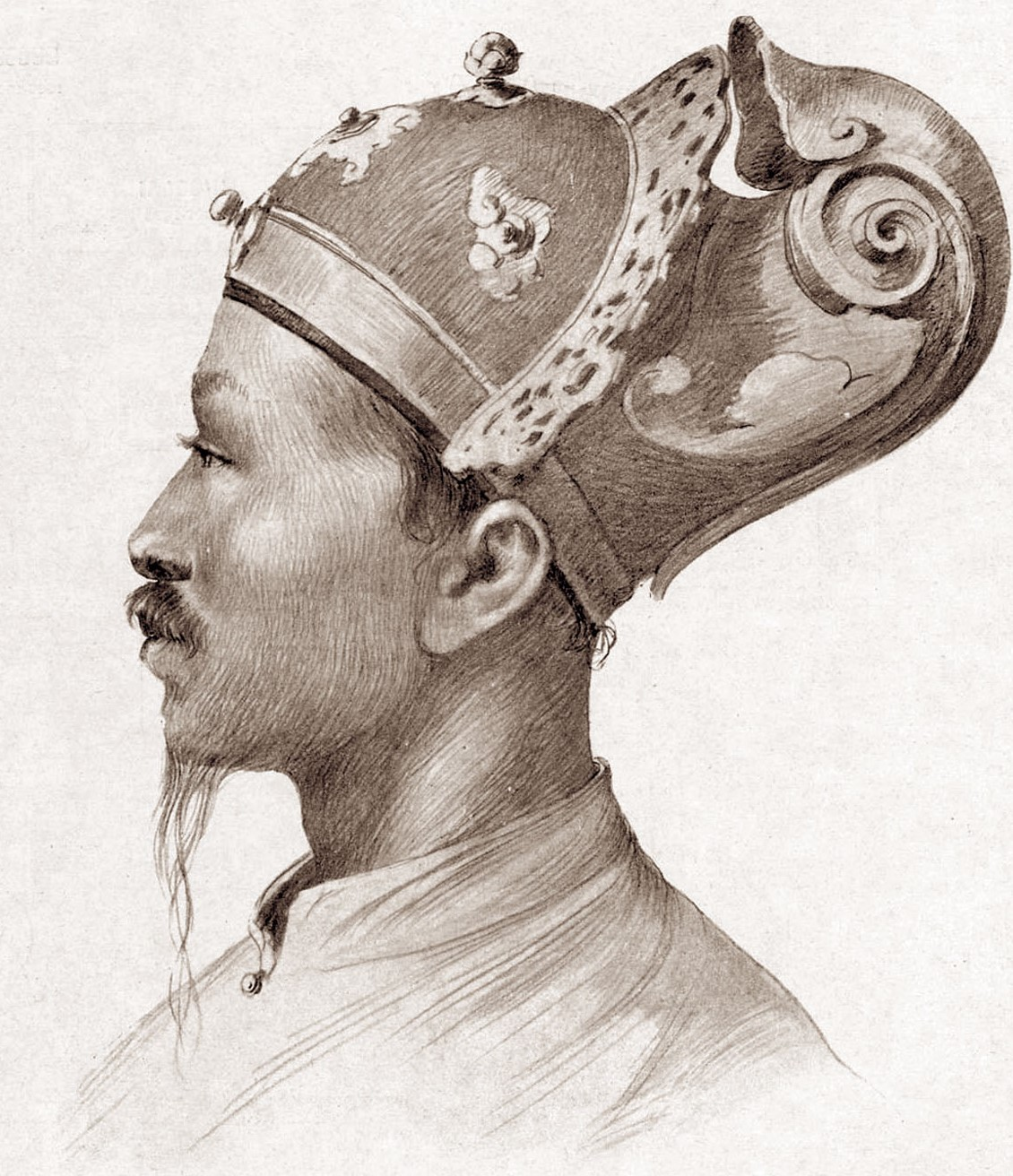
Emperor Tự Đức (r. 1848–1883) of Vietnam

From 1849 to 1862, during the early years of the Vietnamese emperor Tự Đức (r. 1848–1883) of Vietnam, the most intense, brutal and bloodiest anti-Christian persecution ever in history happened in Vietnam, also was the last state-sponsored persecution of Catholic Christians in Vietnam, as a part of Tự Đức's efforts to eradicate every trace of Vietnamese Christianity. The persecution suddenly stopped in 1862 after a royal decree was passed by Tự Đức himself which granted Catholicism legitimate freedom to practice and protection.

== The persecution ==
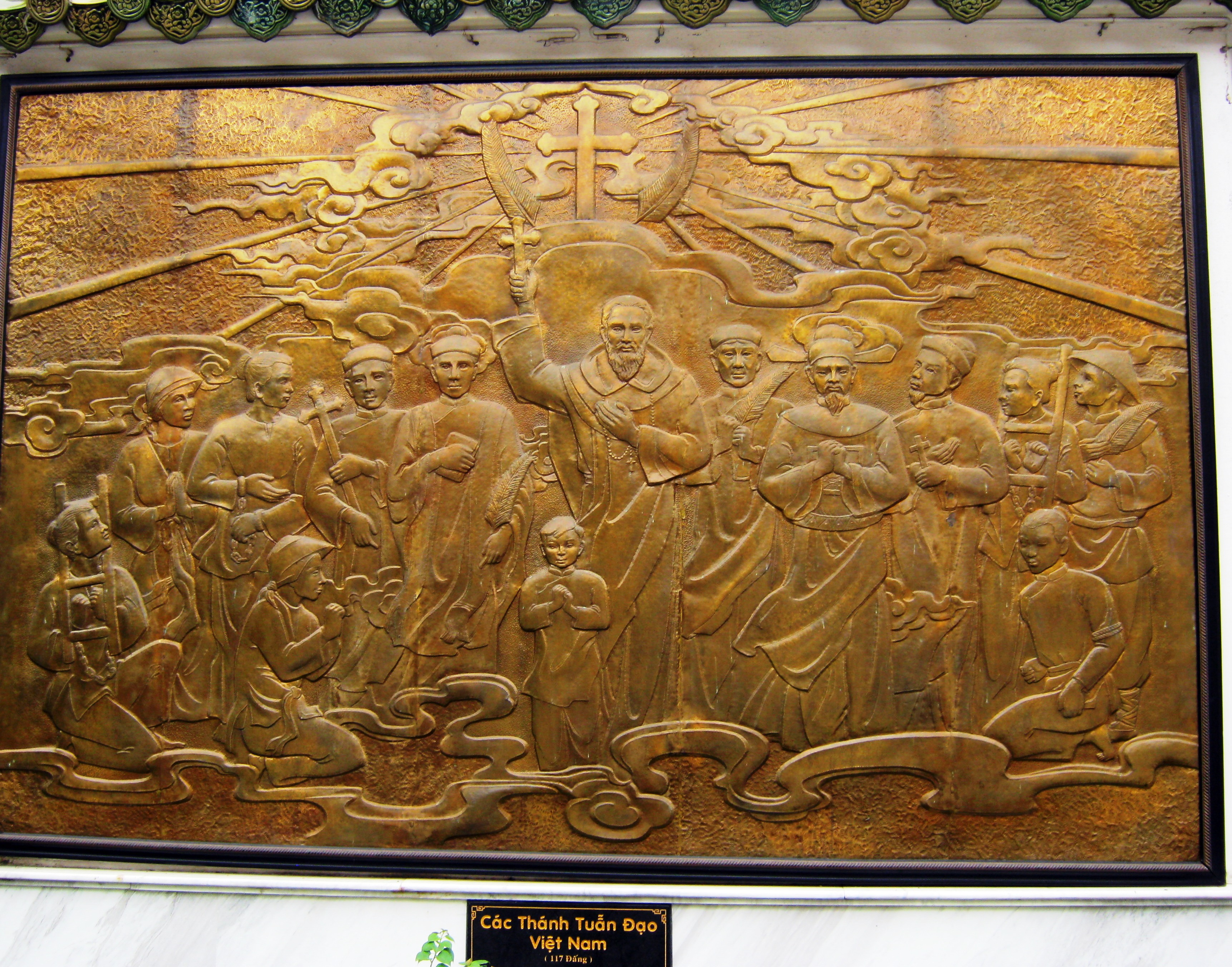
Sculpture of Vietnamese martyrs at the Cha Tam Church, Ho Chi Minh City

The persecution began in 1848, the year of Tự Đức's inauguration. Accusing the Catholic Christians of abandoning ancestor worship, Buddha, and practicing superstitions, and fearing that they would revolt against his rule, Tự Đức labeled the Catholics as tả đạo (heretics), and issued a nation-wide edict to forbid Catholicism. Missionaries were thrown onto the sea. Vietnamese priests had to denounce their faith, and they would face severe punishments and be tagged as tả đạo on their cheeks. The persecution was seen as retaliatory for the French incursion on Danang last year, as Tự Đức shut down all contacts between his kingdom and the outside world.

Two years later, on 21 March 1851, Tự Đức ordered a new edict against the Franciscans. Vietnamese priests who did not denounce their beliefs and trample the cross would face the same fates as European missionaries, being executed and cut into pieces and thrown onto rivers.

In September 1855, accusing Catholic sympathy of Le loyalists rebelled against his rule, Tự Đức ordered a new decree, all churches to be burned, all public Christian gatherings were banned, and all efforts were to destroy the tả đạo (Christians). In early 1857, Napoleon III sent Charles de Montigny to negotiate trade with Vietnam, which Tự Đức ignored. The ship captain La Capricieuse previously had sent a letter to Tự Đức demanding free trade and religious freedom. At the same time, the court was holding Christian high-ranking mandarin Michael Hồ Đình Hy's trial and execution for being a "traitor". Before departing, de Montigny opened fire at the Vietnamese port of Da Nang as a threatening warning to Tự Đức, calling for ceasing the persecution. Furious, Tự Đức believed that these provocations were part of Christians' plots with foreign enemies. Feeling insecure, on 6 June the emperor issued a new edict to consolidate his policy over Christianity. He forced all Christians to have weddings and funerals based on traditional Vietnamese rituals, including the worship of ancestors and spirits.

In 1858, a Catholic convert named Tạ Văn Phụng in Hải Dương Province changed his name to Lê Duy Minh, proclaimed as the emperor of Catholic Vietnam, and rallied Le loyalists against Tự Đức. Two Dominican priests joined his rebellion. In May, the Grand bishop Melchior Sampedro of Huế condemned the Tạ Văn Phụng rebellion as foolish and forbade Christians to join it. However, Tự Đức ordered Sampedro to be executed on 28 July because Tạ Văn Phụng was a Catholic. Ta Van Phung's forces later were said to be 200,000 strong. The rebellion lasted until 1865.

After the French expeditionary army had invaded and seized Saigon in February 1859, Tự Đức launched a new campaign against Catholic mandarins in the government. On 15 December, he issued a new edict which demoted all Catholic officials in the government, and immediate death sentences for those high-ranking mandarins who refused to deny their faith. On 17 January 1860, Tự Đức issued another decree that he would not have the tả đạo set free. In July, he banned and targeted the Lovers of the Holy Cross.

On 5 August 1861, the worst persecution came to the Christians. The emperor issued a royal "dispersal" decree in order to eliminate Christianity at its root:

- Round up and relocate all Christians to non-Christian (Buddhist, Vietnamese folk religion,...) villages.
- Supervision of every Christian by five non-Christians in every village.
- Destroy all Christian churches, villages and communities.
- Confiscate all lands owned by Christians and distribute them to non-Christians.
- All Christians are tagged in their cheeks with two words tả đạo (heretics).

== End of persecution ==
The situation began to change in the next year, as Tự Đức lost three southern provinces to France. The Treaty of Saigon between France and Vietnam was signed on 6 June 1862 which forced Tự Đức to liberalize his religious policies. He issued an edict in late 1862 which reverted and abolished all of his previous anti-Christian orders. Catholicism was officially recognized, and worshipers gained protection. Tự Đức then sent a Catholic intellectual, Nguyễn Trường Tộ, to France to study European technology and philosophy.

== Martyrs ==
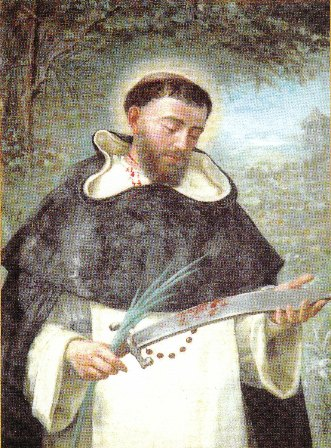
Portrait of Spanish Bishop Pedro Almat Bình, tried and beheaded by Vietnamese authority on 1 November 1861 in Hai Duong

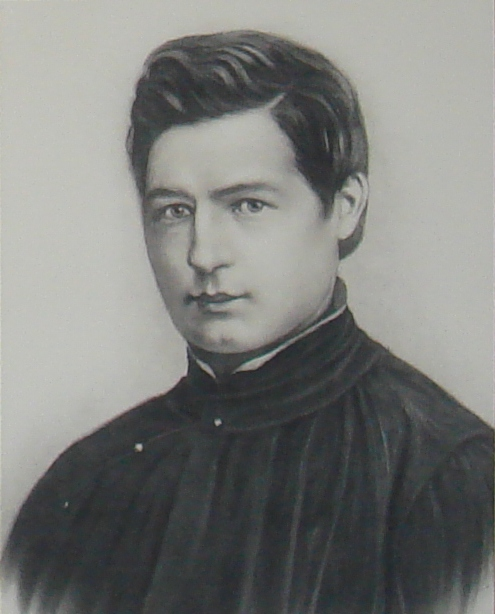
Bishop Théophane Vénard from Diocese of Poitiers. Tried and beheaded on 2 February 1851 in Cau Giay, Hanoi.

Between 1848 and 1860, about 25 missionaries, 300 Vietnamese priests and 30,000 Christians died and were martyred in many ways, from suffering decapitation to death by a thousand cuts under the hands of Tự Đức.

- Pedro Almató Bình, born 1830, Dominican Order, executed on 1 November 1861, Hải Dương.
- Valentín de Berriochoa Vinh (Valentín de Berriochoa), born 1827, Dominican Order, executed on 1 November 1861, Hải Dương.
- Jean-Louis Bonnard, born 1824, MEP, executed on 1 May 1852, Nam Định.
- Đỗ Đình Cẩm, Dominican Order, executed on 11 March 1859, Hưng Yên.
- Etienne-Théodore Cuénot, born 1802, MEP, died in prison on 14 November 1861, Bình Định.
- José María Díaz Sanjuro An, born 1818, Dominican Order, executed on 20 July 1857, Nam Định.
- Pedro Đinh Văn Dũng, burn to death on 6 June 1862, Nam Định.
- Vinh Sơn Phạm Văn Dương, born 1821, burn to death on 6 June 1862, Nam Định.
- Paul Vũ Văn Dương, born 1792, executed on 3 June 1862, Nam Định.
- Pedro Đa, burn to death on 17 June 1862, Nam Định.
- Matthew Nguyễn Văn Đắc, executed on 26 May 1861.
- Melchor García Sampedro, born 1821, Dominican Order, executed on 28 July 1858, Nam Định.
- Paul Trần Văn Hạnh, born 1826, executed on 28 May 1859, Saigon.
- Jerónimo Hermosilla Vọng, born 1800, Dominican Order, executed on 1 November 1861, Hải Dương.
- John Đoàn Trinh Hoan, born 1798, executed on 26 May 1861, Đồng Hới.
- Lawrence Nguyễn Văn Hưởng, born 1802, executed on 13 February 1856, Ninh Bình.
- Michael Hồ Đình Hy, born 1808, executed on 22 May 1857, Huế.
- Dominic Phạm Trọng Khảm, born 1779, Dominican Order, executed on 13 January 1859, Nam Định.
- Joseph Nguyễn Duy Khang, born 1832, executed on 6 December 1861, Hải Dương.
- Paul Lê Văn Lộc, born 1830, executed on 13 February 1859, Saigon.
- Joseph Nguyễn Văn Lựu, born 1790, died in prison on 2 May 1854, Vĩnh Long.
- Philip Phan Văn Minh, born 1815, executed on 3 July 1858, Vĩnh Long.
- Pierre François Néron, born 1818, MEP, executed on 3 November 1860, Sơn Tây.
- Lawrence Phạm Viết Ngôn, born 1840, executed on 22 May 1862, Nam Định.
- Pedro Đoàn Công Quí, born 1826, executed on 31 July 1859, Châu Đốc.
- Augustin Schoeffler, born 1822, MEP, executed on 1 May 1851, Sơn Tây.
- Théophane Vénard, born 1829, MEP, executed on 2 February 1851, Cầu Giấy.
