= Jean-Baptiste Cécille =

Admiral Jean-Baptiste Cécille
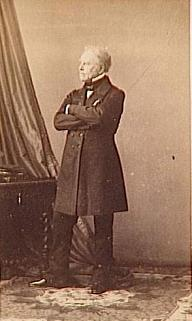
- Admiral Jean-Baptiste Cécille (1787–1873)
- Born: 1787; Rouen
- Died: 1873 (aged 85–86)
- Military career
- Allegiance: France
- Branch: French Navy
- Rank: Admiral
- Conflicts: Bombardment of Đà Nẵng

Jean-Baptiste Thomas Médée Cécille (French pronunciation: [ʒɑ̃ batist tɔmɑ mede sesil]; 16 October 1787, Rouen – 9 November 1873) was a French Admiral and politician who played an important role in the French intervention of Vietnam. He also circumnavigated the globe.

== Military career ==
In 1837–1839, Cécille circumnavigated the world as the commander of the corvette Héroïne. He left Brest on 1 July 1837 with the objective of protecting French whaling ships. He contributed to the survey of New Zealand.

In 1843, the French Foreign Minister François Guizot sent a fleet to Vietnam under Admiral Cécille and Captain Charner, which started the French intervention in Vietnam. The move was partially in response to Britain's victory in the First Opium War, which France hoped to counterbalance by accessing China from the south. The pretext however was to support British initiatives in China, and to fight the persecution of French missionaries in Vietnam. The fleet, accompanied by the diplomat Théodore de Lagrené, tried to seize the island of Basilan in order to create a base similar to Hong Kong, but projects had to be abandoned following the strong opposition of Spain claiming the island was part of the Philippines.

In 1845 Guizot sent Cécille to Vietnam to obtain the release of a Catholic missionary, Bishop Dominique Lefèbvre.

Two years later, in 1847, when Lefèbvre was recaptured, Cécille sent Captain Lapierre to Danang to obtain the release of the bishop yet again. It is not established if Captain Lapierre knew that Bishop Lefebvre had already been freed and was on his way to Singapore before he started his attack by first dismantling the masts of some Vietnamese ships. Subsequently, on 14 April 1847, the French continued their attack by sinking the remaining five bronze-plated ships in the bay of Danang.

In June 1846, Cécille sailed to Okinawa to try to establish relations with Japan. He then sailed to Nagasaki but was denied landing.

In September 1846, Cécille sailed to Korea in order to obtain the release of an imprisoned Korean priest named Andrew Kim Taegon, but Kim was soon executed.

In 1847, Cécille sent two warships (Gloire and Victorieuse) to Tourane in Vietnam to obtain the liberation of two imprisoned French missionaries, Bishop Dominique Lefèbvre (imprisoned for a second time as he had re-entered Vietnam secretly) and Duclos, and freedom of worship for Catholics in Vietnam. As negotiations drew on without results, on 15 April 1847 a fight erupted between the French fleet and Vietnamese ships, three of them being sunk as a result in the Bombardment of Đà Nẵng. The French fleet then sailed away. The French would come back under Admiral Charles Rigault de Genouilly to capture Tourane (Da Nang) on 1 September 1858, and Saigon on 17 February 1859.

After these events Cécille again sailed to Korea to try to infiltrate some missionaries, but his ship ran aground and he had to be rescued by a British ship.

== Political career ==
Back in France, Cécille took on a career in politics. He became a representative for the department of Seine-Inférieure in the 1848 Assembly (Assemblée Constituante). He supported Louis-Napoléon Bonaparte, and was nominated Ambassador to the British Court in London.

In 1852, he became a Senator.

== Legacy ==
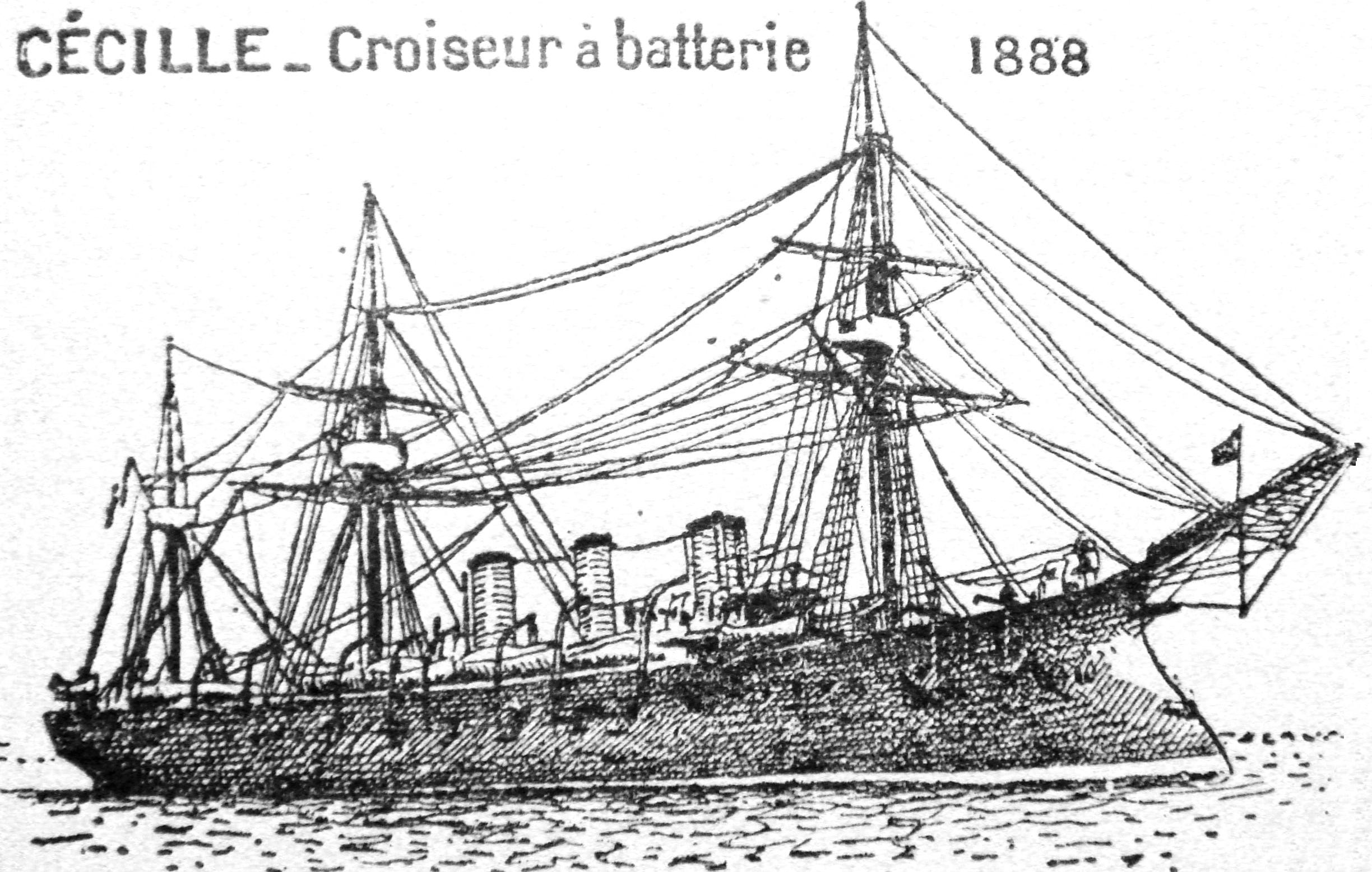
The 1888 French cruiser Amiral Cécille.

The Ōsumi Islands Group in southern Japan, which was explored by Cécille in 1846, was named "Cécille archipelago" ("Archipel Cécille") on French charts.

A peak on the Île de la Possession in the Crozet Islands, where he once landed, was named "Mont Cécille" (46°23'00" S, 51°41'00" E) after him in the 1960s.

The French cruiser Amiral Cécille (1888-scrapped 1919) was named in his honour.

== See also ==
- France-Japan relations (19th century)
