= Bombardment of Tourane (1856) =

The second French bombardment of Tourane (Đà Nẵng) took place on 26 September 1856, between the first bombardment in 1847 and the third bombardment at the start of the Cochinchina campaign in 1858.

Tự Đức, who succeeded to the Vietnamese throne in 1847, increased the persecution of Christians in Vietnam. At first, he only forbade the missionaries to proselytise on pain of death. Later, he instituted bounties for the heads of foreign missionaries and Vietnamese converts. Two French missionaries, Jean-Louis Bonnard and Augustin Schoeffler, were executed. In 1856, the French government decided to formally protest. The sloop of war Catinat under Commander William Le Lieur de Ville-sur-Arce was then at Bangkok waiting to escort the special envoy Charles de Montigny to Vietnam in order to negotiate a new commercial treaty.

The Catinat left Bangkok on 12 August 1856 and arrived before Tourane, the port of the capital, Huế, on 16 September. De Montigny remained in Bangkok negotiating a commercial treaty with Siam. On 19 September, Le Lieur entered the Perfume River and laid anchor. He sent the missionary Father Fontaine ashore with letters from De Montigny. The mandarins refused at first to accept them, since the Emperor Thiệu Trị had made it a capital offence for any official to receive a letter from a European. Fontaine was forced to leave them on the beach overnight. The following day, having been forwarded to Huế, the letters were returned unread. This was regarded by Le Lieur as "an insult to a representative of the Emperor of France" and a cause for war.

On 26 September, Le Lieur bombarded the Vietnamese forts. Unlike in 1847, he put a detachment ashore. They took about 40 prisoners, threw a quantity of black powder into the sea, spiked about 60 guns and burned the gun carriages. Many of these works had been completed after the bombardment of 1847. The following day some mandarins came aboard Catinat and offered to make a peace treaty on French terms, but Le Lieur opted to await the arrival of De Montigny. On 24 October, another ship, La Capricieuse, arrived from Bangkok. The Catinat was thereafter recalled to Macau because of the ongoing war with China. De Montignty arrived aboard the Marceau only on 23 January, but was refused an audience, Tự Đức having interpreted the departure of Catinat as a victory for himself.
