= Tạ Văn Phụng =

Vietnamese noble

Tạ Văn Phụng (chữ Hán: 謝文奉; ? - 1865), also Bảo Phụng, Lê Duy Phụng (黎維奉), and Lê Duy Minh (黎維明) was a Vietnamese noble, a convert to Catholicism and pretender to the Vietnamese throne. He was engaged by the French on the recommendation of the priest Théophile Le Grand de la Liraye (1819–1873), but his pretensions to the throne were disliked by Charles Rigault de Genouilly who led the French invasion of Vietnam in 1858.

The Christian-inspired Bắc Bộ rebellion or Tonkin revolt of the pretender Pierre Le Duy Phung against Tự Đức broke out in 1861, the Vietnamese court was parleying with admiral Louis Adolphe Bonard in the south. Only after Bonard rejected alliance with the pretender and made a temporary peace with the Nguyen court at Hue, could Nguyen forces head north to protect Hanoi - after which the revolt was put down in 1865.
