= Charentais (IGP) =

French wine region and protected geographical indication

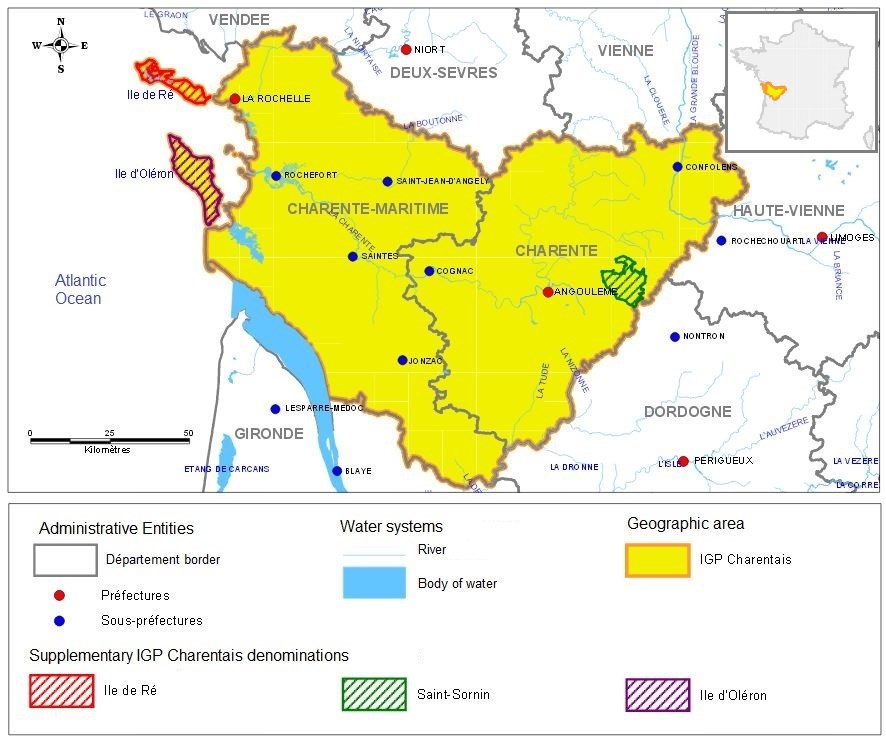
IGP Charentais French Wine Region

IGP Charentais, formerly known as vin de pays charentais up until 2009, is a French wine region and protected geographical indication (indication géographique protégée). It covers the French départements of Charente and Charente-Maritime in south-west France.

== Grape varieties ==
Red, rosé and dry white wines are produced in the IGP Charentais.

Red varieties: Cabernet Franc, Cabernet Sauvignon, Gamay, Merlot and Pinot Noir. These varieties are also used to produce rosé wine.

White varieties: Chardonnay, Colombard, Sauvignon blanc.

== Soils ==
The most common soil type is clay-limestone, but more sandy soils are present in the coastal areas and on the île de Ré and île d'Oléron.

== Climate ==
The IGP Charentais has a moderate maritime climate. The average temperature is 13 °C.

== Taste profile ==
The Official Bulletin of the French Ministry of Agriculture outlines typical organoleptic profiles of IGP Charentais wines.

Red wines generally show a red fruit, ripe fruit and spice character. They are light in body but have nice structure and smooth tannins.

White wines are characterized by their refreshing acidity and citrus aromas.

== Yields ==
The maximum yield is 90 hectoliters/hectare.

== Supplementary geographic designations ==
Wines with grapes harvested in the following sub-regions can be labelled with following supplementary designations:

- Île de Ré
- Ile d'Oléron
- Saint-Sornin
