= Prosper de Chasseloup-Laubat =

French aristocrat & politician (1805–1873)

The Marquis of Chasseloup-Laubat
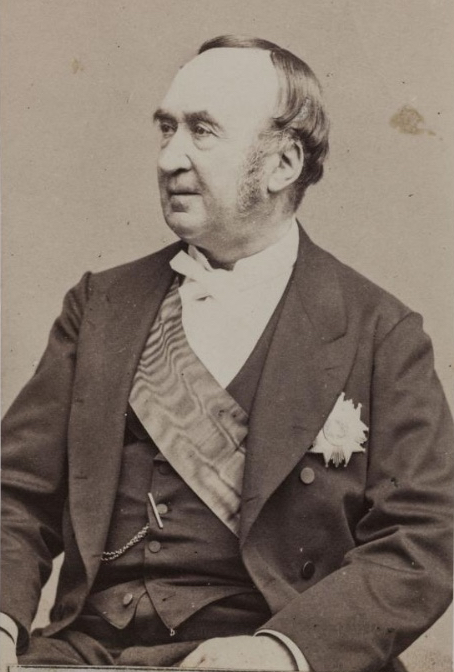
- Prosper de Chasseloup-Laubat in 1862.

Minister of Marine and the Colonies
- In office 24 November 1860 – 20 January 1867
- Monarch: Napoleon III
- Preceded by: Ferdinand Hamelin
- Succeeded by: Charles Rigault de Genouilly

Personal details
- Born: 29 May 1805 Alessandria, Italy
- Died: 29 March 1873 (aged 67) Paris, France
- Occupation: Politician

Justin Napoléon Samuel Prosper de Chasseloup-Laubat, 4th Marquis of Chasseloup-Laubat (29 May 1805, Alessandria, Department of Marengo, French Empire – 29 March 1873, Paris, France) was a French aristocrat and politician who became Minister of the Navy under Napoleon III and was an early advocate of French colonialism.

== Early life and family ==
Chasseloup-Laubat was the descendant of a minor noble family from Saintonge whose members were Huguenot but converted to Catholicism in the 17th century. He was the youngest son of the General François de Chasseloup-Laubat, 1st Marquis of Chasseloup-Laubat (1754–1833), and of his wife Anne-Julie Fresneau de La Gataudière, granddaughter of François Fresneau de La Gataudière who had discovered the properties of rubber. His godparents were Emperor Napoleon I and his first wife Empress Josephine. His brother, Justin (1800–1847), 2nd Marquis of Chasseloup-Laubat, was a military and politician and died as he was serving as French ambassador to the German Confederation. At his death, the title of Marquis passed to his brother Prudent (1802–1863), also a military and politician, who as well died childless and was succeeded by Prosper. They had also a sister, Anne-Clémence de Chasseloup-Laubat (1798–1871) who married in 1818 François-Scipion, 1st Baron de Bernon.

Prosper de Chasseloup-Laubat was educated at Lycée Louis-le-Grand then became a civil servant and from 1828 worked at the Conseil d'État, thanks to the good relations of his father.

== Career ==
=== Under the July Monarchy ===
Immediately after the July Revolution, Chasseloup-Laubat became aide-de-camp of the commander of the National Guard, Marquis de La Fayette, and despite the change of regime he remained at the Conseil d'État and was promoted inside its inner hierarchy.

In 1836, he was appointed as an assistant to Jean-Jacques Baude, Royal commissary in Algeria, and worked at Alger, and then at Tunis, Bône and Constantine. He was present at the failed siege of Constantine by the French army in November 1836, before turning back to France and reassuming his functions at the Conseil d'État. In 1838 he was appointed a councillor at the Conseiller d'État.

At the same time, he was also beginning a political career. On 3 September 1837, he was elected deputy of Charente-Inférieure, the Department where was situated the family seat, the château of La Gataudière, and he was reelected in November 1837, March 1839, July 1842 and August 1846. He took his seat with the Left Center and approved the government policy. He was also a member and then president of the departmental council of the Charente-Inférieure.

=== Minister under the Second Empire and advocate of French colonialism ===
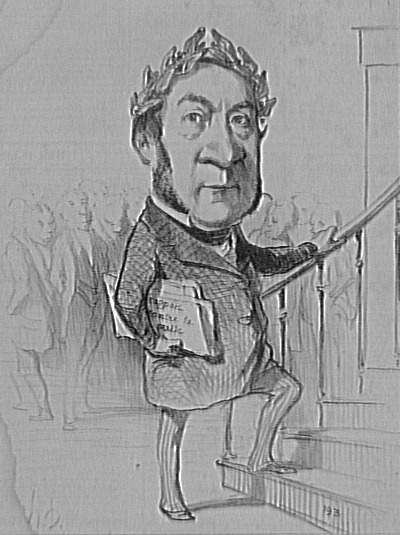
Prosper de Chasseloup-Laubat according to Honoré Daumier.

The Revolution of 1848 was a momentary set-back for his career, but on 13 May 1849 he was elected again as a deputy for Charente-Inférieure. During the Second Republic, he voted with the Conservatives of the Party of Order and from 10 April to 26 October 1851 briefly served a first time as Minister of Marine under the Presidency of Louis-Napoléon Bonaparte.

After the coup d'état of December 1851, he was appointed a member of the consultative commission replacing the Chambre des Députés, and was one of the candidates of the government in Charente-Inférieure at the election of February 1852, where he was elected. As deputy to the Legislative Body (a new lower chamber replacing the Chambre des Députés), he worked for the restoration of the Empire, which was approved by referendum in November 1852. Nevertheless, in 1852 he was one of the members of the Legislative Body who took the liberty of criticizing the first budget of the new regime (they were called les budgétaires), and the same year he publicly protested the confiscation of the properties of the House of Orléans. He stayed a deputy until 1859, when he became a minister. On 25 May 1862, he was appointed a Senator of the Empire, a position he retained until the fall of the Empire in 1870.

Chasseloup-Laubat was an enthusiastic proponent of French colonial imperialism. Member of the "Council of colonisation" which assisted the newly created Ministry for Algeria and the Colonies, in March 1859 he was himself put at the head of the Ministry in replacement of Prince Napoléon. Belonging to a generation of new politicians working to give a coherence to French colonial policy, he was one of the few ministers of Napoleon III who had not already held ministerial offices when the Second Empire was established. Just one month later, he personally visited Algeria, which he had known at the time of its conquest. He lost direct control over Algeria with the reestablishment of the function of Governor General of Algeria, but immediately became Minister of Marine and the Colonies in November 1860 and held that position for an exceptionally long period (1860–1867), making him a key figure of French early colonial expansion. He worked in combination with his counterpart, Foreign Minister Édouard Drouyn de Lhuys.

He was Minister at the time of the attacks on Danang and Saigon in Vietnam led by Charles Rigault de Genouilly and his successor Counter-Admiral Théogène François Page. On 18 February 1859, the French conquered Saigon and three southern Vietnamese provinces. The Vietnamese government was forced to cede temporary control of those territories to France in June 1862. When in 1863 the Vietnamese diplomat Phan Thanh Gian visited Napoleon III on an embassy in Paris, Chasseloup-Laubat pressured Napoleon III to have him give up a promise he had made to return the territories captured by the French in exchange for a loose French protectorate over the whole of Vietnam. He threatened Napoleon III with his resignation and that of the whole cabinet, forcing him to order the cancellation of the agreement in June 1864. Chasseloup-laubat conceived the idea of conquest in the Far east, and asserted in February 1863, "it is a real empire that we need to create for ourselves". In 1864, all the French territories in southern Vietnam were declared to be the new French colony of Cochinchina.

During his tenure as Minister of the Marine and the Colonies, he also modernised the French navy and inspired the creation at Brest of an institution for the orphans of the navy, placing it under the special protection of the Emperor.

With the help of his wife, he was also an actor of the elaborate social life of the Second Empire, a period popularly referred to as the fête impériale ("the Imperial festival"). On 13 February 1866, he gathered one of the most flamboyant receptions of the time, a masquerade ball during which, dressed as a Venetian noble, he received his 3000 guests (between whom the Emperor and the Empress) in the restored salons of the ministry, Rue Royale. The climax of the reception, which lasted until half past six in the morning, was a "Cortege of the Nations". It was also a symbolic expression of the minister's political stance and of France's imperialist aspirations.

Chasseloup-Laubat was recalled to the government on 17 July 1869, as Minister-President of the Conseil d'État, and took part to the constitutional changes which were expected to transform the Second Empire into a parliamentary monarchy. However, after the collective resignation of the cabinet in December 1869, Émile Ollivier did not include Chasseloup-Laubat in the new cabinet he formed on 2 January 1870. He remained a senator until the end of the Second Empire.

After the fall of Napoléon III, Chasseloup-Laubat was elected once again a Deputy of Charente-Inférieure to the new National Assembly on 8 February 1871 and took his seat with the Orléanist parliamentary group, Centre droit. He still played a minor role as rapporteur of the law on the organisation of the army in 1872, and died one year later in Paris. He is buried at the Père Lachaise Cemetery.

== Private life ==
On 18 August 1862 at Saint Augustin, he married Marie-Louise Pilié (5 December 1841, New Orleans – April 1921, Paris), a distant relative of his, whose family was from Saintonge, but established in Louisiana. She was the daughter of Louis Armand Pilié and of Rose Elisabeth Eleonore Lapice de Bergondy, and a niece of Confederate General P. G. T. Beauregard. She fostered her husband's career by playing the role of a social hostess for the high society of the Second Empire. They had two sons, who both were notable in sport:

- Louis de Chasseloup-Laubat, 5th Marquis of Chasseloup-Laubat (1863–1954) was president of the French Fencing Federation (Fédération française d'escrime) and co-wrote the rules for international fencing competition.
- Count Gaston de Chasseloup-Laubat (1867–1903), a race car driver, is known for setting the first recognised automobile land speed record.

The Marquis of Chasseloup-Laubat was President of the Société de géographie from 1864 to his death, and used also that honorary position to propagate his colonial agenda.

== Honours ==
- Commander (1851), then Grand Cross of the Legion of Honour (18 September 1860)
- Knight Grand Cross of the Order of Saints Maurice and Lazarus
- Grand Cross of the Order of Christ (Portugal)
- Grand Cross of the Order of the Oak Crown
- Grand Cross of the Order of Charles III
- Grand Cross of the Order of Isabella the Catholic
- Grand Cross of the Order of Glory (Tunisia)
- Grand Cross of the Imperial Order of Our Lady of Guadalupe

A bronze statue in his honour was erected at Marennes. It was destroyed during the Vichy regime but replace by a new one after the war. A street and a school in Saigon were named after him until the independence of Vietnam.

== Style ==
- 1817-1859: Viscount Prosper de Chasseloup-Laubat
- 1859-1963: Count Prosper de Chasseloup-Laubat
- 1863-1873: The Marquis of Chasseloup-Laubat

=== Ancestry ===
Ancestors of Prosper de Chasseloup-Laubat

16. Nathanaël Chasseloup, lord of Laubat (ca 1600–1667)
8. Nathanaël Chasseloup de Laubat (1660–1722), knight of the Order of Saint Louis, Governor of Monaco
17. Jeanne Esnaud de La Classe, married in 1641
4. François Chasseloup de Laubat
18. Pierre Greisel de Stamberg
9. Marie-Salomé Greisel de Stamberg (-1725), married 28 May 1707
19. Anne Barbara Jenson
2. François, 1st Marquis of Chasseloup-Laubat (1754–1833)
20. Barthélemy Couyer (1636–1693), lord of Les Palus and Toucheronde
10. Nathanaël Couyer (1675–), lord of Toucheronde,
21. Jeanne Chasseloup de Laubat, married 24 Dec 1664
5. Marguerite-Esther Couyer de Toucheronde (1713–1780), married 15 Sep 1739
22. Élie Regnault, lord of La Traverserie
11. Esther Regnault (-1752), married 8 Fev 1711
23.
1. Prosper, 4th Marquis of Chasseloup-Laubat
24. François Fresneau, lord of La Ruchauderie
12. François Fresneau de La Gataudière (1703–1770), lord of La Ruchauderie
25. Anne Regnault de La Gataudière (-1758)
6. Charles-Jean-Baptiste Fresneau de La Gataudière (1740–1795)
26. Jacques Solain-Baron, lieutenant in the French navy
13. Cécile Solain-Baron (-1749), married 10 Jun 1738
27. Cécile Gueguen
3. Anne-Julie Fresneau de La Gataudière (-1848), married 21 Dec 1794
28. Philippe Richier (1667–), lord of La Rochelongchamps and Touchelonge
14. Isaac-Jacques Richier (1708–1775), Captain at the Regiment de Vexin
29. Suzanne de Collignon, married 24 Apr 1704
7. Suzanne-Anne-Marguerite Richier (1743–1794), married 17 Mar 1768
30. Charle-Henri Martin de Bonsonge (1685–)
15. Anne-Esther Martin de Bonsonge (-1795), married 30 Nov 1739
31. Judith Michel de Beauroche, married 20 May 1714

== Notes ==
Political offices
Preceded by Auguste-Nicolas Vaillant	Minister of the Navy; 10 April 1851 – 26 October 1851	Succeeded by Hippolyte Fortoul
Preceded by Napoléon Joseph Charles Paul Bonaparte	Minister of Algeria and the Colonies; 24 March 1859 – 24 November 1860	Succeeded by himself (Title changed to "Minister of the Navy and the Colonies")
Preceded by Ferdinand Hamelin (as Minister of the Navy)	Ministers of the Navy and the Colonies; 24 November 1860 – 20 January 1867	Succeeded by Charles Rigault de Genouilly
Preceded by Adolphe Vuitry	Minister President of the Conseil d'État; 17 July 1869 – 2 January 1870	Succeeded by Félix Esquirou de Parieu
French nobility
Preceded by Prudent de Chasseloup-Laubat	Marquis of Chasseloup-Laubat; 17 December 1863 – 29 March 1873	Succeeded by Louis de Chasseloup-Laubat
