= Théophile Le Grand de la Liraye =

Théophile Le Grand de la Liraÿe (1819–1873) was a French Roman Catholic priest, later defrocked, in Vietnam at the time of Charles Rigault de Genouilly's invasion of Vietnam in 1858. He compiled a French-Vietnamese dictionary.

== Publications ==
- 1866: Notes historiques sur la nation annamite
- 1874: Dictionnaire élémentaire annamite-français; 2nd ed.
- Prononciation figurée des caractères chinois en mandarin annamite; autographié par Trâñ Ngu'oń Hanh, d'après le manuscript original du P. Legrand de La Liraÿe
