= Michael Hồ Đình Hy =

Vietnamese mandarin official, Catholic martyr

Saint Michael Hồ Đình Hy
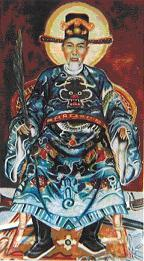

Martyr
- Born: c. 1808; Vietnam
- Died: 22 May 1857 (aged 48–49)
- Venerated in: Roman Catholic Church
- Beatified: 5 July 1900, St. Peter's Basilica, Vatican City by Pope Leo XIII
- Canonized: 19 June 1988, St. Peter's Basilica, Vatican City by Pope John Paul II
- Feast: 22 May
- Attributes: Vietnamese clothing Phốc Đầu; Martyr's palm Dadao
- Patronage: Vietnam

Michael Hồ Đình Hy (chữ Hán: 胡廷僖; 1808– 22 May 1857) was a Vietnamese mandarin official who was martyred for his Roman Catholic belief during the persecutions by Emperor Tự Đức. He was canonized in 1988 along with another 116 Vietnamese Martyrs.

== Life ==
Hồ Đình Hy was born to Christian parents in Cochinchina, and was by profession a wealthy silk trader. The youngest of five surviving children out of twelve, he was married to a Christian from another family and had two sons and three daughters. Like other Christians at the time, they practiced their faith in private. At age 21, he was made mandarin of the fifth order and appointed Superintendent of the royal silk mills. Eventually, he rose to become grand mandarin of the third order and appointed to be Steward of the King's household. He was one of a few trusted officials who traveled abroad to conduct trades with other countries like Singapore and Malaysia. At the height of Christian persecution, when his eldest son requested to become a priest, he arranged to have him study in the Dutch East Indies (now Indonesia). After his remaining son died at the age of 12, Hồ Đình Hy declined to have his elder son returned home, according to Confucian traditions, citing he could not protect his own faith. During his thirty-one years at the emperor's post, he performed many charitable acts to local unfortunates and helped to transport French and Portuguese missionaries on the waterways through his region under the guise of official business. His quick planning helped the missionaries to travel through Vietnam discreetly and safely. The memoirs wrote that he personally traded his official robe as payment when the ship that transported the bishop of Society of Foreign Missions of Paris accidentally caused damage to a local merchant ship. He also offered clemency to robbers of the royal silk mill when they were captured. He was entrusted to guard missionaries' written records. These activities were illegal, as Christian missionary activity had been banned by the Nguyễn dynasty. He did not practice the faith publicly until late in life, becoming protector of the Christian community, which irked his fellow mandarins.

=== Arrest ===
Unlike other unnamed Vietnamese Martyrs whose lives and deeds were orally recorded, parts of Hồ Đình Hy's life could be found in memoirs of the Fathers of Foreign Missions in France. A local magistrate, discontented after Hồ Đình Hy had denied him access to the royal silk mill, petitioned the emperor for his arrest based on his Christian activities.

During his imprisonment and torture, he played a gambit with the local magistrates by signing a confession that he was involved with the French government. The French had ships moored in Tourane (now Da Nang) with designs to colonize Vietnam under the guise of religious liberty and freedom of commerce. France, being a Catholic nation, did not favor the Vietnamese court persecuting Christians. The gambit was done in the hope that Emperor Tu Duc would appease the French by letting Hồ Đình Hy and other Christians go, but it did not work when the French ships sailed off. The bishop of Society of Foreign Missions of Paris secretly requested that he recant his confession because it only resulted in more persecutions and France would not justify her presence in Vietnam based on religious persecutions alone. He repented and signed a corrected confession, but it never made to the king's court. His last days were spent in repentance and humility.

=== Death ===
At the king's decree, Hồ Đình Hy was beheaded after suffering public humiliation and torture, and all of his possessions were confiscated by the local magistrates. Some witnesses accounted that he refused his last meal and chose to die near his birthplace instead of at the execution site. He also chose to wear his official robe instead of prisoner garb on his last day. The memoirs of Fathers of Foreign Missions (Society of Foreign Missions of Paris) mentioned he received last rites discreetly by local priests and was survived by his wife and a married daughter. His remains were buried at the Basilica of Phú Cam and his birthplace. He was the last high-ranking official to be executed under the Nguyễn dynasty.

During his imprisonment and years after his death, Hồ Đình Hy was criticized for his written confession as means for further Christian persecution. Twenty-five years after his death, his eldest son, a retired priest, returned from the Dutch East Indies and justified his father's gambit. His written confession named him and his immediate family, along with non-existent people in the surrounding towns as Christians. As a result, his parents, in-laws and other relatives were spared from his fate. Other Christian towns and villages, while were raided, ended up with no further arrests.

== Canonisation ==
He was petitioned to the Vatican for sainthood in 1867 by Louis Pallard of the Society of Foreign Missions of Paris. He was beatified in 1900 by Pope Leo XIII in the Fortissimorum Virorum Seriem. Pope John Paul II canonized him in 1988 along with other 116 Vietnamese Martyrs.

To commemorate his beatification in 1900, a historian, Nguyễn Hữu Bài (courtesy name Phước Môn), educated under the Vietnamese court, summarized his life as follows:

Traditional characters	Modern translations
	Tự Đức ngự đề văn khổ khắc, Đức Leo châu điểm nét tiêu diêu Emperor Tự Đức condemned his earthly life, Pope Leo glorified him in the afterlife.
