= Dausara (see) =

Christian see in upper Mesopotamia

Dausara is a former residential episcopal see in the Roman province of Osrhoene, a suffragan of Edessa. It is now a titular see of the Catholic Church.

== Location ==
Stephanus Byzantius mentions Dansara as a town near Edessa (Orfa), and Procopius says it was one of the castles around Theodosiopolis, which were fortified by Justinian. Its site is supposed to be at Qal'at Dja'bar (Qal'at Dusar).

== History ==
The see appears in the Notitia episcopatuum of the Patriarch of Antioch. Its bishop Nonnus was present at the Second Council of Constantinople in 553. The see must have disappeared in connection with the Muslim conquests.

== Name of the titular see ==
The Holy See uses the spelling "Dausara", as it did already for the appointment in 1783 of Daniel Delany (who was to become Bishop of Kildare and Leighlin in 1787) as the first titular bishop. From 1844 until the early 20th century it used the spelling "Dansara".
