= Charles de Montigny =

French diplomat

Louis Charles de Montigny (French pronunciation: [ʃaʁl də mɔ̃tiɲi]; 1805–1868) was a French diplomat who was active in Asia during the 19th century.

== Biography ==
He was the first French consul in Shanghai from 23 January 1848 to 10 June 1853. He founded the Shanghai French Concession in 1849.

In 1856, de Montigny was sent as a French envoy to King Mongkut of Thailand. A treaty was signed on 15 August 1856 to facilitate trade, guarantee religious freedom, and allow the access of French warships to Bangkok.

From Thailand, de Montigny visited Vietnam in 1857 to demand the establishment of a consulate in Huế, freedom to trade and to preach, and an end to persecution against Catholics. However, the Vietnamese court rejected all of his demands. When Montigny's mission failed, Napoléon III decided to dispatch a military force of 3,000 to Vietnam, leading to the capture of Da Nang by Charles Rigault de Genouilly on 1 September 1858.

Charles de Montigny returned to France definitively in 1859, dying there in 1868.
