= François Fresneau de La Gataudière =

French botanist and scientist

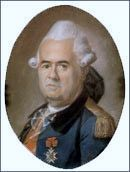

François Fresneau (29 September 1703 – 25 June 1770) was a French botanist and scientist, and is credited for having written the first scientific paper on rubber. He also was known for having the first early idea of waterproof material.
