= Saint-Sornin, Charente-Maritime =

Saint-Sornin
- Commune
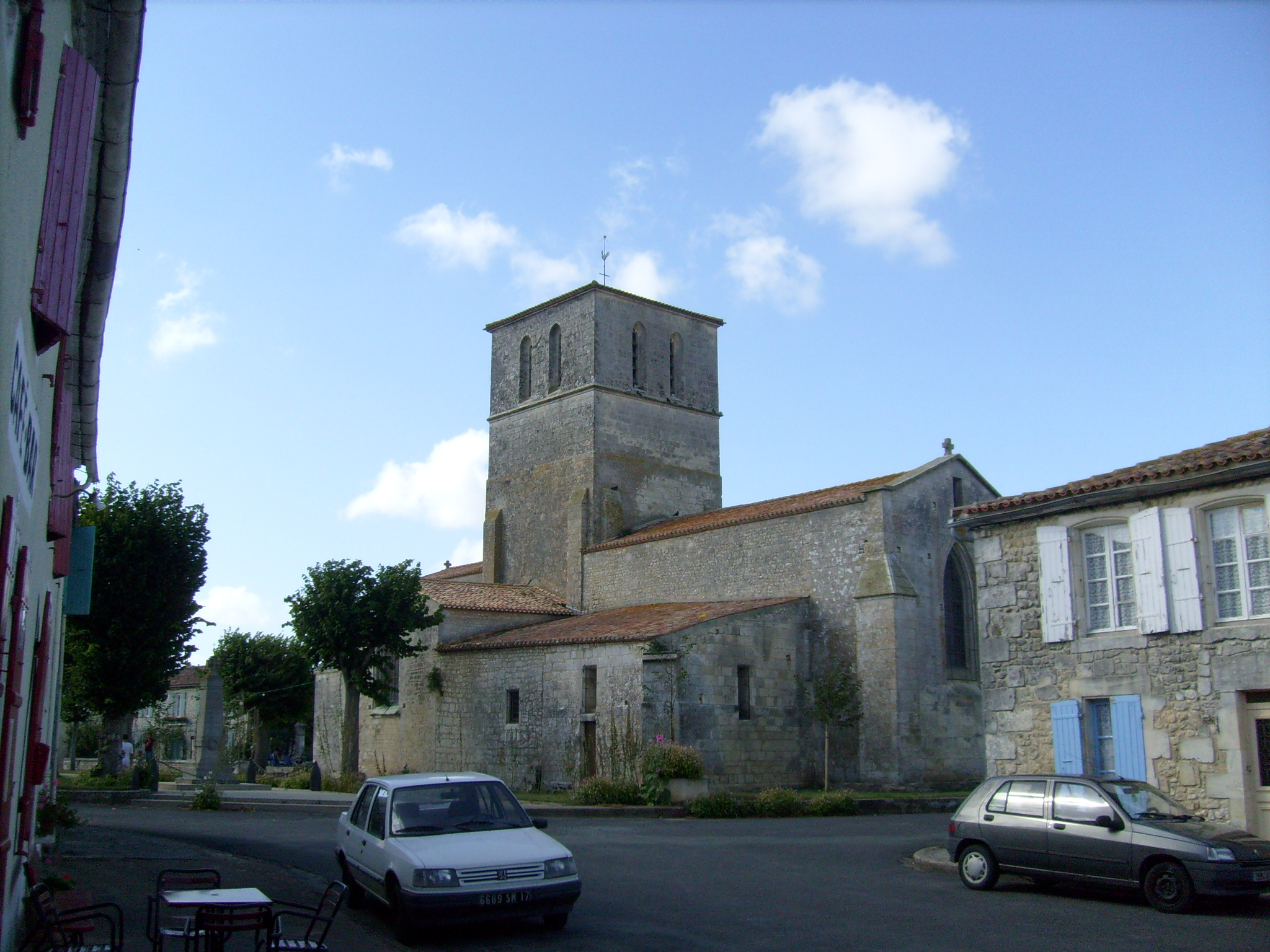
- The church of Saint-Saturnin in Saint-Sornin
- Location of Saint-Sornin
- Location within France Location within Nouvelle-Aquitaine
- Coordinates: 45°46′10″N 0°58′40″W
- Country: France
- Region: Nouvelle-Aquitaine
- Department: Charente-Maritime
- Arrondissement: Rochefort
- Canton: Marennes

Government
  - Mayor (2020–2026): Joël Papineau
- Area^{1}: 13.49 km^{2} (5.21 sq mi)
- Elevation: 15 m (49 ft)
- Highest elevation: 31 m (102 ft)
- Lowest elevation: 0 m (0 ft)
- Population (2023): 415
  - Density: 30.8/km^{2} (79.7/sq mi)
- Time zone: UTC+01:00 (CET)
  - Summer (DST): UTC+02:00 (CEST)
- INSEE/Postal code: 17406 /17600
- ^{1} French Land Register data, which excludes lakes, ponds, glaciers > 1 km^{2} (0.386 sq mi or 247 acres) and river estuaries.

Saint-Sornin (French pronunciation: [sɛ̃ sɔʁnɛ̃]) is a commune in the Charente-Maritime department in southwestern France.

Saint Sornin is just off the main road between Saintes and Marennes. There is only a bar/cafe and a bakery in the village, with the closest shops in Marennes. There is a small campsite just outside the village on the road to Brue. The road to Brue is a dead end, but there are some old ruins and a small bird life museum at the end of the road.

== Population ==
Historical population
Year	Pop.	±% p.a.
1968	316	—
1975	344	+1.22%
1982	310	−1.48%
1990	322	+0.48%
1999	328	+0.21%
2007	304	−0.95%
2012	322	+1.16%
2017	389	+3.85%
2023	415	+1.08%
Source: INSEE

== See also ==
- Communes of the Charente-Maritime department
