= Bombardment of Tourane (1847) =

1847 naval skirmish between France and Vietnam

Date	15 April 1847
Location	Off Tourane (Da Nang), South Central Coast of Vietnam
Result	French victory

Belligerents
France	Đại Nam

Commanders and leaders
Augustin de Lapierre; Charles Rigault de Genouilly	Nguyễn Tri Phương

Strength
1 frigate 1 corvette	6 corvettes

Casualties and losses
One dead One wounded	40 killed and drowned, 90 wounded, 104 missing 4 corvettes sunk 1 corvette damaged

The Bombardment of Tourane (15 April 1847) was a naval incident that took place during the short reign of the Vietnamese emperor Thiệu Trị (1841–47), which saw a considerable worsening of relations between France and Vietnam. The French frigates Gloire and Victorieuse, which had been sent to Tourane (now Da Nang) to negotiate for the release of two French Catholic missionaries, were surprise attacked by several Vietnamese vessels. The two French ships fought back, sinking four Vietnamese corvettes, badly damaging a fifth, and inflicting just under 230 casualties. In response to this and other provocations, the French eventually decided to intervene actively in Vietnam, and a decade later launched the Cochinchina Campaign (1858–62), which inaugurated the period of French colonial rule in Vietnam.

== Background ==
French missionaries had been active in Vietnam since the seventeenth century, and by the middle of the nineteenth century there were perhaps 300,000 Catholic converts in Annam and Tonkin. Most of their bishops and priests were either French or Spanish. Most Vietnamese disliked and suspected this sizeable Christian community and its foreign leaders. The French, conversely, began to feel responsible for their safety. During the reigns of the Vietnamese emperors Minh Mạng (1820–41) and Thiệu Trị (1841–47), Catholic missionaries were forbidden to live and work in Vietnam, and several European missionaries who ignored this edict were either banished or, on occasion, executed.

French naval captains in the Far East were given instructions to negotiate with the Vietnamese authorities when such cases occurred. On two occasions they intervened with considerable success. On 25 February 1843, capitaine de frégate Favin-Lévêque, captain of the French warship Héroine, anchored off Da Nang to intercede for the release of five missionaries detained at Huế for two years. After long and frustrating negotiations, the five missionaries were released. In 1845, the French corvette Alcmène (capitaine de frégate Fornier-Duplan) went to Da Nang to ask for the release of Dominique Lefèbvre, the French vicar apostolic of Lower Cochinchina, who was being held prisoner at Huế. Again, the Vietnamese acceded to the French request, and Lefèbvre was released.

== Bombardment ==
The 1845 intervention was ordered by Admiral Cécille, the senior French naval officer on station. In 1847, Dominique Lefèbvre secretly re-entered Vietnam. He and another missionary, Duclos, were imprisoned. The arrest of the two missionaries provoked a further confrontation between the Vietnamese rulers and the ships of the French Navy charged with protecting the interests of Roman Catholic missionaries in Vietnam.

In March 1847, Cécille sent the 54-gun frigate Gloire (capitaine de vaisseau Augustin de Lapierre) and the 24-gun corvette Victorieuse (capitaine de frégate Charles Rigault de Genouilly) to Da Nang, with instructions to negotiate for the liberation of the two imprisoned French missionaries and to seek a commitment from the Vietnamese authorities to allow freedom of worship for Roman Catholics in Vietnam.

Probably because the Vietnamese considered Lefèbvre's return to Vietnam a deliberate provocation by the French, the negotiations failed. Discussions dragged on without result, and on 15 April 1847, six Vietnamese corvettes attacked the two French ships in the Bay of Tourane. In the brief action that followed, the French sank four Vietnamese corvettes and disabled a fifth, and inflicted nearly 1,200 casualties on the outclassed Vietnamese sailors.

According to the French, the Vietnamese spun out the negotiations to win time to assemble a fleet, and then treacherously attacked the two French warships without warning. Colonel Alfred Thomazi, the historian of the French conquest of Indochina, also claimed that the Vietnamese first attempted to lure the French officers to their deaths:

Thiệu Trị, indignant with this interference, decided to end the affair with a surprise attack. His plan was to invite the French officers to a banquet, kill them, and then burn and sink the ships. But Commandant Lapierre was on his guard, and declined the invitation. The mandarins, seeing the first part of their programme go astray, passed on to the second. They attacked.

Thomazi gave the following description of the battle in Tourane Bay:

Gradually the Annamese war fleet, consisting of five corvettes with covered batteries, several bricks and a large number of junks, gathered in the bay, and one morning, without prior warning, attacked the French vessels. These, as their armament was far superior, had little difficulty in destroying the entire enemy fleet, but they had to get underway thereafter, abandoning the Christians to the vengeance of their persecutors.

Lefèbvre was released by the Vietnamese authorities either before or shortly after the battle (the sources differ).

== Significance ==
The Vietnamese naval defeat at Tourane dramatically demonstrated the technological superiority of the French warships over the antiquated vessels of the Vietnamese fleet. In the eyes of many thoughtful Vietnamese, it demonstrated that the kingdom's blind adherence to the values and traditions of the past had left it painfully vulnerable to European coercion, and spurred calls for modernization.

Harassment of the Christians eventually provided France with a pretext for attacking Vietnam. The tension built up gradually. During the 1840s, the persecution of Roman Catholic missionaries in Vietnam evoked only sporadic and unofficial French reprisals, such as that taken by de Lapierre and Rigault de Genouilly in 1847. In 1857, however, the execution of two Spanish Catholic missionaries by the emperor Tự Đức led directly to French intervention in Vietnam. In September 1858, a joint French and Spanish naval expedition landed at Da Nang. Its commander was Admiral Charles Rigault de Genouilly, one of the two French naval captains involved in the 1847 incident. The resultant Cochinchina campaign inaugurated the era of French colonial rule in Vietnam.
