= Charles Rigault de Genouilly =

French Navy officer

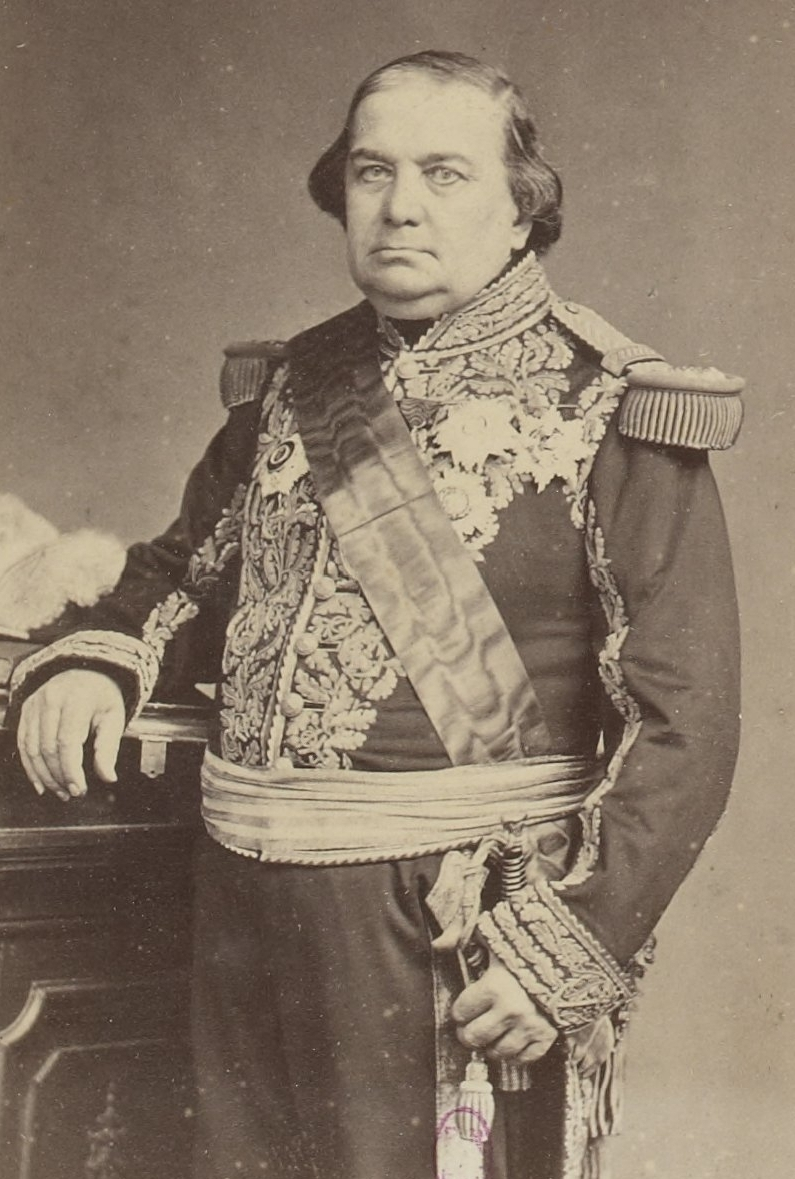
- Born: 1807; Rochefort, France
- Died: 1873 (aged 65–66); Barcelona, Spain
- Military career
- Allegiance: Second French Empire
- Branch: French Navy
- Rank: Admiral of France
- Conflicts: Bombardment of Tourane (1847); Crimean War; Second Opium War; Cochinchina campaign

Admiral of France Pierre-Louis-Charles Rigault de Genouilly (12 April 1807 – 4 May 1873) was a French Navy officer. He fought with distinction in the Crimean War and the Second Opium War, but is chiefly remembered today for his command of French and Spanish forces during the opening phase of the Cochinchina campaign (1858–62), which inaugurated the French conquest of Vietnam.

== Early career ==
Charles Rigault de Genouilly was born and raised in Rochefort, Charente-Maritime, France, into a family with naval connections. His father was a naval engineer and his mother, Adélaïde-Caroline Mithon de Genouilly, was the niece and adopted daughter of Claude Mithon de Genouilly, a naval commander during the American War of Independence.

Rigault de Genouilly entered the École Polytechnique in 1825. He entered the navy as a midshipman in 1827, and served in the Morea expedition aboard the frigate Fleur de Lys during the Greek War of Independence. In 1828 he was transferred to Résolue, and took part in operations against pirates in the Greek archipelago.

Promoted enseigne de vaisseau in 1830, he participated in the French invasion of Algiers and the forcing of the Tagus in 1831. In 1832 he served aboard Ducreuse during the blockade of the Dutch coast in the Belgian War of Independence. He was promoted lieutenant de vaisseau in 1834.

In 1843, he assumed command of the corvette Victorieuse on the China and India Seas station, and took part in an expedition to explore the Yellow Sea. On 25 April 1847 Victorieuse and Gloire (capitaine de vaisseau Augustin de Lapierre), which had been sent to Da Nang (Tourane) to negotiate for the release of two French Catholic missionaries, were attacked without warning by several Vietnamese vessels, in an incident known as the Bombardment of Tourane. The two French ships fought back, and with their superior armament rapidly destroyed their attackers. In August 1847 Victorieuse ran aground on the coast of Korea, but Rigault de Genouilly was exonerated from blame by a court of enquiry.

He was promoted captaine de vaisseau in July 1848, and served on a commission charged with studying the defences of Havre. He then became chef de cabinet of the navy minister Joseph Grégoire Cazy. Between 1849 and 1851 he was captain successively of the paddle steamer frigate Vauban and of Charlemagne, the first screw-driven French battleship converted from a sailing ship. This type of conversion was called a vaisseau mixte to distinguish it from purpose-built steam ships such as Napoléon. He conducted extensive tests on Charlemagne, for which he received the thanks of the admiralty.

== Crimean War ==
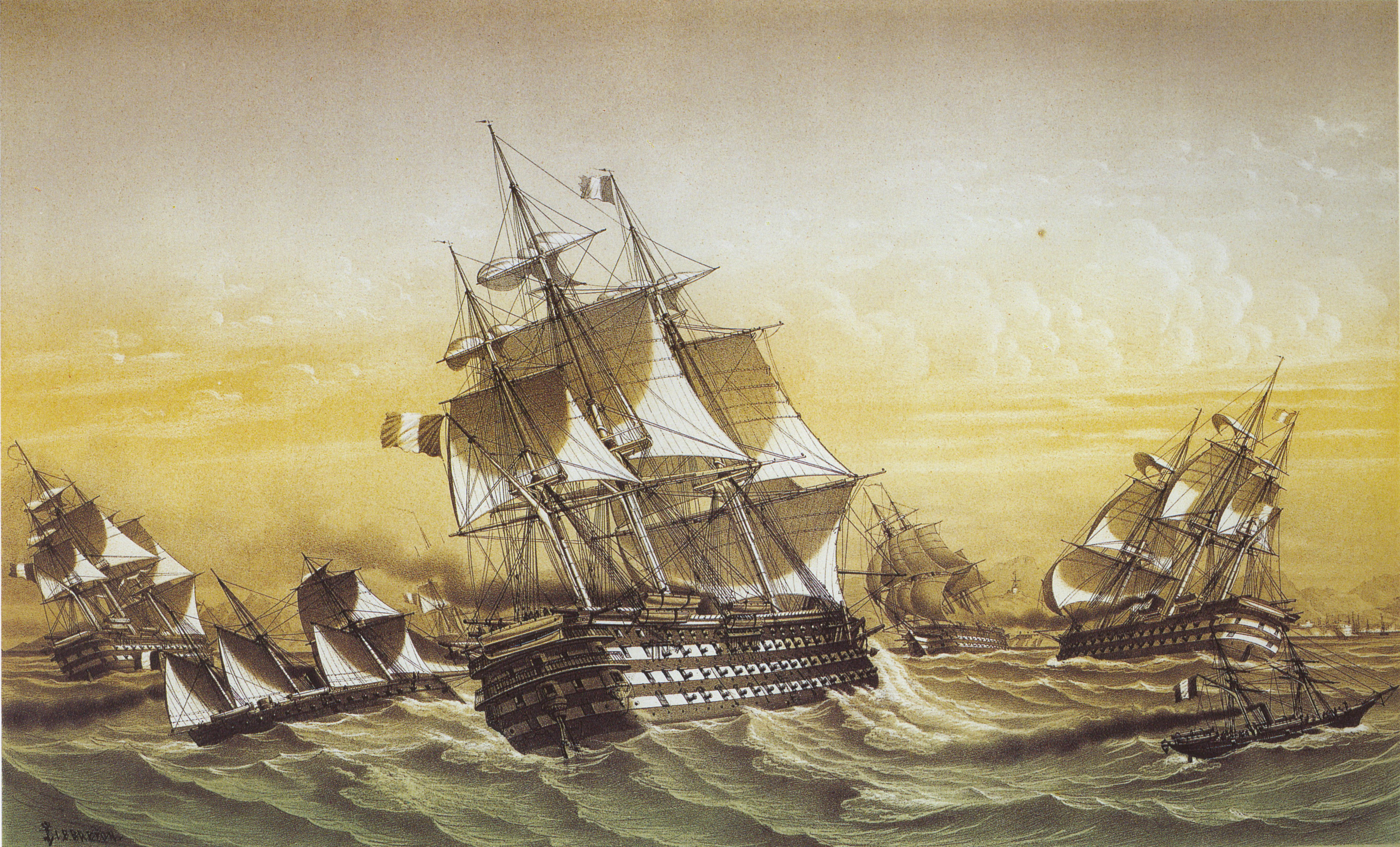
Rigault de Genouilly was appointed flag captain of the Ville de Paris in 1853.

In 1853 he was appointed flag-captain of the ship of the line Ville de Paris by Admiral Hamelin and took part in the bombardment of Odessa on 22 April 1854, one of the early naval actions of the Crimean War. Promoted contre-amiral (rear admiral) in 1854, he served with distinction in the siege of Sebastopol, where he was in command of the French marines (fusiliers-marins).

== Second Opium War ==
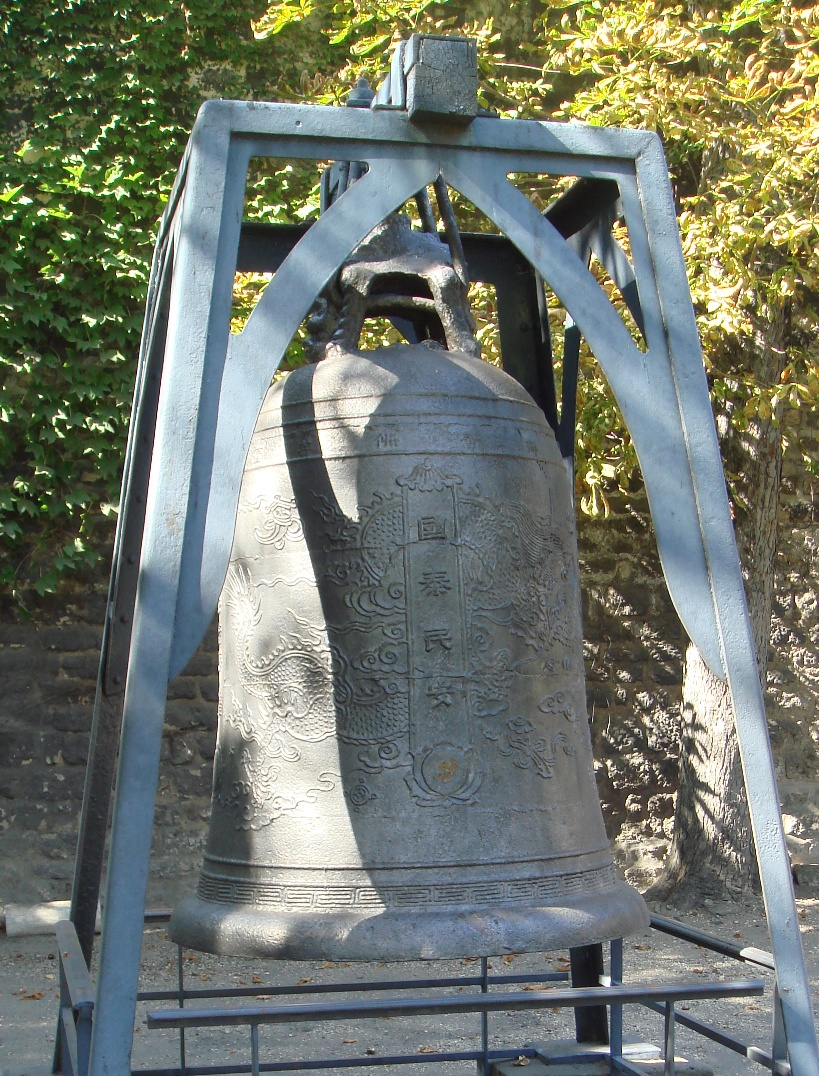
Chinese bell brought from Canton by Rigault de Genouilly, now in the park of the Paris Foreign Missions Society.

In 1857 Rigault de Genouilly sailed aboard the frigate Némésis to join the naval armada assembled by Admiral Léonard Charner for the Second Opium War, and was placed in command of the French naval division. During the campaign he took part in the blockade of Macau and captured Canton. After this success he served at the capture of the Hai River forts and accompanied the Anglo-French expedition to Tianjin.

== War in Vietnam ==
In November 1857, in response to the execution of two Spanish missionaries by the Vietnamese emperor Tự Đức and the failure of a diplomatic mission to Huế led by Charles de Montigny, Rigault de Genouilly was authorised by the French emperor Napoleon III to launch a punitive expedition against Vietnam. In September 1858 a joint French and Spanish expedition under his command landed at Da Nang and captured the city.

The allies expected an easy victory, but the war did not at first go as planned. Vietnamese resistance was more stubborn than had been expected, and the French and Spanish found themselves besieged in Da Nang by a Vietnamese army under the command of Nguyen Tri Phuong. The Siege of Đà Nẵng lasted for nearly one and a half years, and although there was little fighting disease took a heavy toll of the allied expedition. The siege eventually ended with the unopposed evacuation of the French garrison in March 1860.

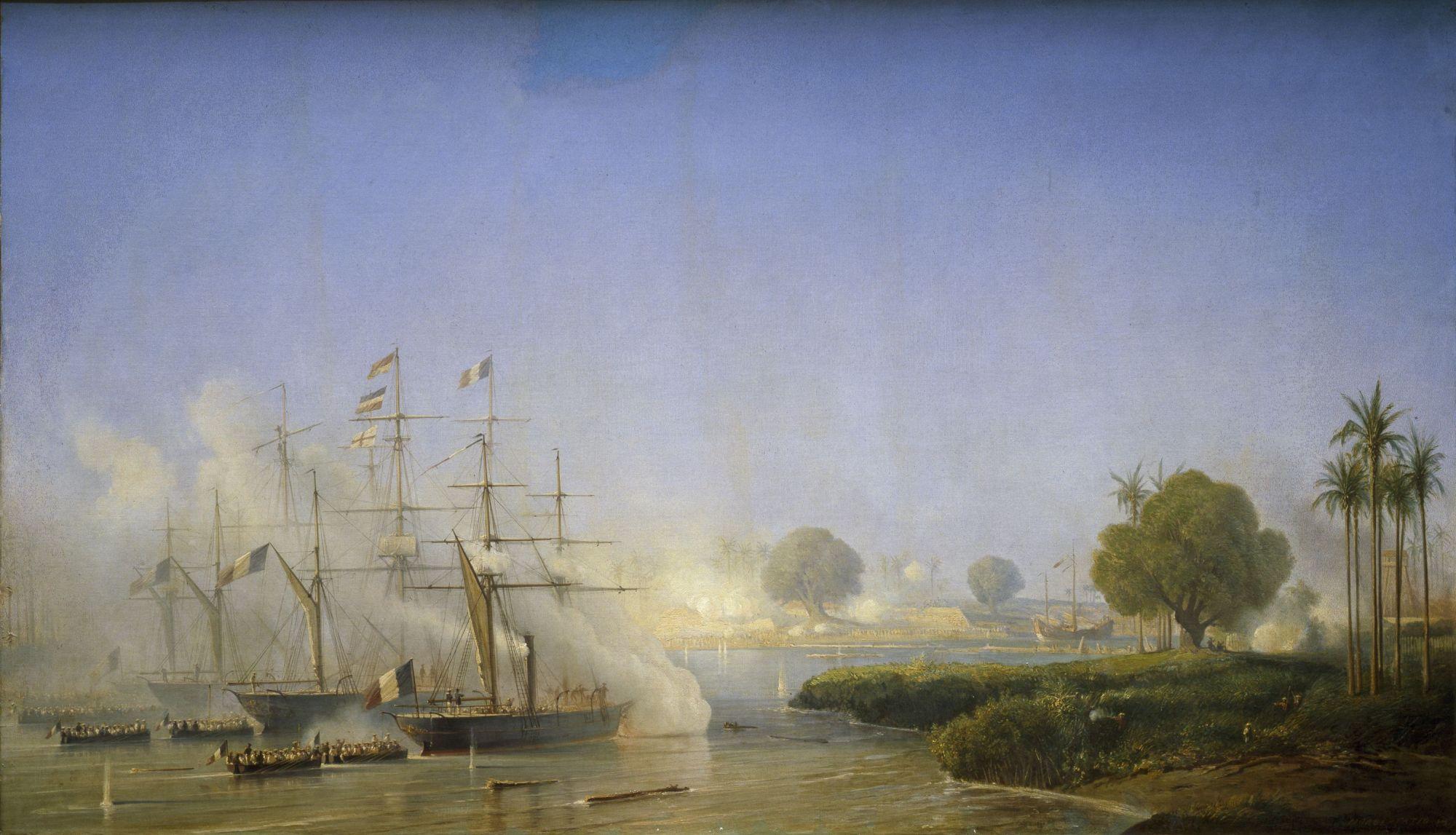
The Capture of Saigon, 17 February 1859, a painting by Antoine Morel-Fatio

Shortly after his capture of Da Nang, Rigault de Genouilly cast around for somewhere else to strike the Vietnamese. In January 1859 he proposed to the navy ministry an expedition against Saigon in Cochinchina, a city of considerable strategic significance as a source of food for the Vietnamese army. The expedition was approved, and in early February, leaving capitaine de vaisseau Thoyon at Da Nang with a small French garrison, Rigault de Genouilly sailed south for Saigon with a powerful naval flotilla and a Franco-Spanish landing force. On 17 February 1859, after forcing the river defences and destroying a series of forts and stockades along the Saigon river, Rigault de Genouilly captured Saigon. The allies were not strong enough to hold the enormous Citadel of Saigon, and on 8 March 1859 blew it up and set fire to its rice magazines. In April Rigault de Genouilly returned to Da Nang with the bulk of his forces to reinforce Thoyon's hard-pressed garrison. On 8 May 1859 he personally led a French attack on the Vietnamese siege lines at Da Nang. The attack achieved limited success, but the French were unable to break the siege.

In October 1859 Rigault de Genouilly, whose actions in Cochinchina had been severely criticised in France, was replaced by Admiral François Page, who was instructed to obtain a treaty protecting the Catholic faith in Vietnam but not to seek any territorial gains.

== Later career ==
Between 1862 and 1864, following his return to France, Rigault de Genouilly served first aboard Bretagne and then aboard Ville de Paris as commander of the French squadron of evolutions (escadre d’évolutions) in the Mediterranean. He was navy minister from 20 January 1867 to 4 September 1870, replacing Justin de Chasseloup-Laubat. He also became Minister of War on 13 August 1869, succeeding Adolphe Niel. He only held the position for a few days, and was replaced by Edmond Le Bœuf on 21 August 1869.

Rigault de Genouilly turned down the offer of command of one of the French fleets during the Franco-Prussian War and resigned as navy minister on the fall of the Second Empire after the battle of Sedan. One of his last acts as navy minister was to order naval personnel and gunboats to take part in the Siege of Paris. After his resignation he retired to Spain to live out his last years. He died in Barcelona in 1873.

== Commemoration ==
The square next to Saigon River in Saigon was named after him, and his statue was also erected there. However, in 1945 the statue was abducted and then in 1955, the square was also renamed Mê Linh Square.

The French Navy aviso Rigault de Genouilly was named for Charles Rigault de Genouilly.

== Notes ==
Political offices
Preceded by Prosper de Chasseloup-Laubat	Minister of the Navy; 20 January 1867 – 4 September 1870	Succeeded by Martin Fourichon
Preceded by Adolphe Niel	Minister of War; 13 August 1869 – 21 August 1869	Succeeded by Edmond Le Bœuf
