= Garnier Expedition =

1873–74 French expedition in Tonkin

- Part of the French conquest of Vietnam
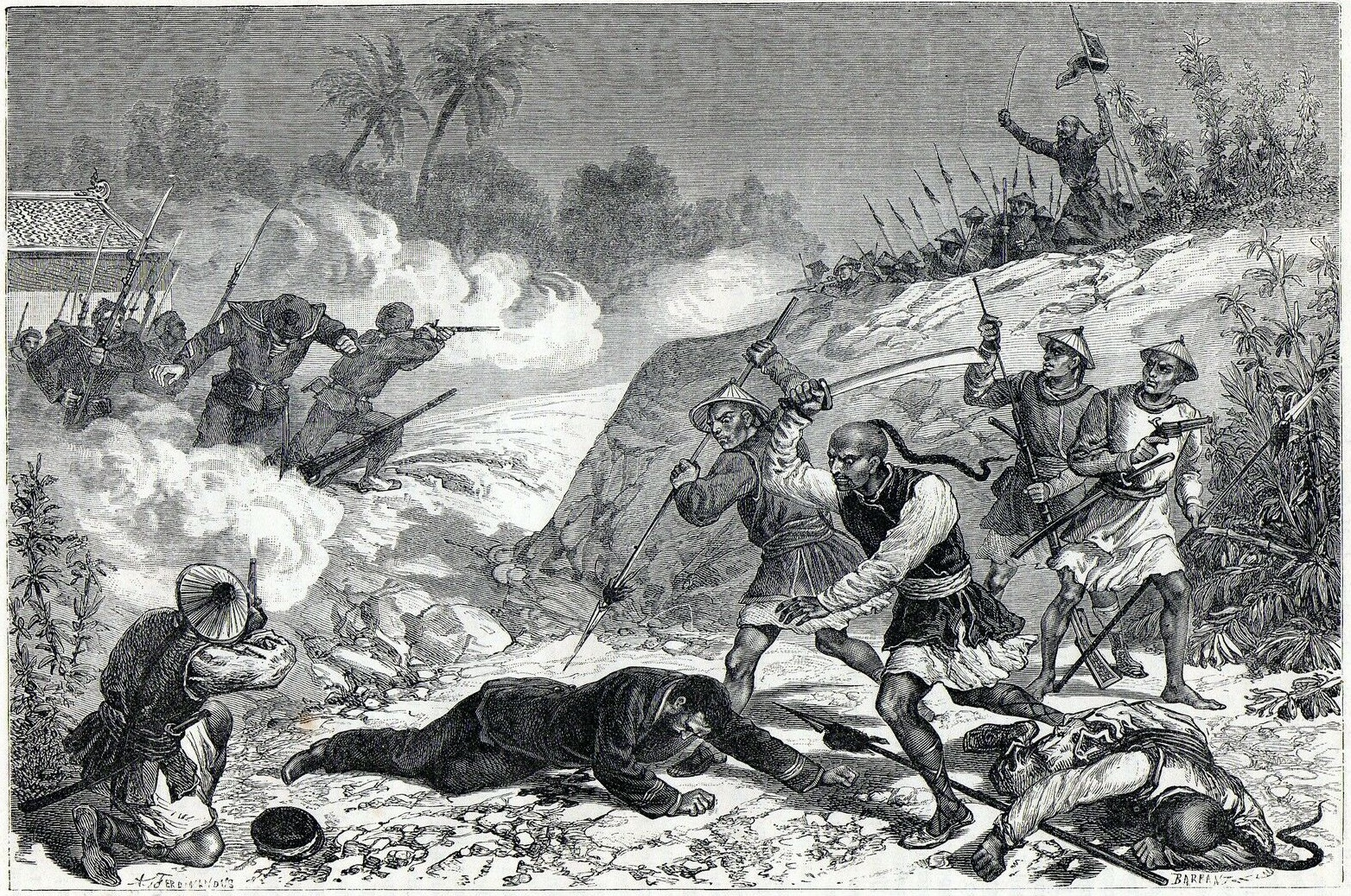
- Lieutenant Garnier is killed by the Black Flags near Hanoi on 21 December
Date	5 November 1873 – 6 February 1874 (3 months and 1 day)
Location	Tonkin, Northern Vietnam
Result	French victory Treaty of Saigon

Belligerents
(French Third Republic) France	Vietnam; Black Flag Army

Commanders and leaders
Francis Garnier †; Charles Esmez; Adrien Balny d'Avricourt †; Henri Bain de la Coquerie; Edgard de Trentinian; Marc Hautefeuille; Édouard Perrin; Georges Bouxin; Jean Dupuis	Emperor Tự Đức; Nguyễn Tri Phương (POW) (DOW); Nguyễn Lâm †; Phan Đình Bình (POW); Đặng Siêu (POW); Phan Thanh Liêm (POW); Phan Thanh Tong (POW); Hoàng Kế Viêm; Nguyễn Vũ (POW); Liu Yongfu

Strength
270 men: 180 marines and sailors; 90 mercenaries; Two gunboats	Hanoi: 7,000; Hưng Yên: Unknown; Phu Ly: 800; Hải Dương: 2,000; Ninh Bình: 1,700; Nam Định: 5,000; Sơn Tây: 2,000; Black Flag troops: 600 Total: 15,000+

Casualties and losses
French force: 5 killed 11+ wounded Dupuis' men: Unknown, at least 1 killed	Hundreds killed Hundreds wounded Thousands captured

The Garnier Expedition was a French expedition in Tonkin between November 1873 and January 1874. Lieutenant Francis Garnier, who had been sent by France on the demand of Vietnamese Imperial authorities to bring back Jean Dupuis, an unruly French trader who was causing trouble in Hanoi, instead decided to side with Dupuis and captured the city of Hanoi, the capital of the Tonkin region.

Following the capture of the city, Garnier and his small force launched themselves in a lightning military campaign that resulted in the conquest of most of the Tonkin region within three weeks. Garnier was eventually killed in action while repulsing an attack on Hanoi on 21 December, but his men nonetheless remained in control of the region.

However, the campaign had not been planned or even allowed by the French government and a treaty was signed in 1874, which gave back all the conquered cities to Vietnam in exchange for a very favourable trade agreement and the installation of a French resident in Hanoi, as well the official recognition of all French possessions in Cochinchina.

== Background ==
In 1858, France and Spain launched a punitive expedition against the Empire of Đại Nam as a response to the persecution of Christian missionaries and converts. Hostilities ended four years later with the Treaty of Saigon, but the French decided to retain the provinces they had conquered during the war, thus giving birth to the French colony of Cochinchina. In 1867 Admiral Pierre de la Grandière forced the Vietnamese to cede the provinces of Châu Đốc, Hà Tiên and Vĩnh Long to French Cochinchina. Though the French de facto took control of these provinces, the Vietnamese Emperor Tự Đức refused to officially recognize the validity of this cession.

In 1873, French explorer and trader Jean Dupuis traveled up the Red River to sell European weaponry to the governor of Yunnan. Eventually, Dupuis also decided to start carrying salt up the river, something which was strictly prohibited by Vietnamese authorities. A lengthy dispute ensued, and Dupuis eventually occupied a district of Hanoi with his 90 Chinese mercenaries. Unwilling to attempt forcefully removing these very well armed men on their own, the Vietnamese authorities issued a complaint to French admiral Marie Jules Dupré, who was serving as Governor of French Cochinchina at the time. Hoping that he would be able to obtain the official recognition of all French possessions in Cochinchina by the Vietnamese Empire if he accepted to help them, Admiral Duprès sent an expedition under Lieutenant Francis Garnier to Hanoi to solve the dispute and convince Dupuis to leave.

== French Expeditionary Force ==
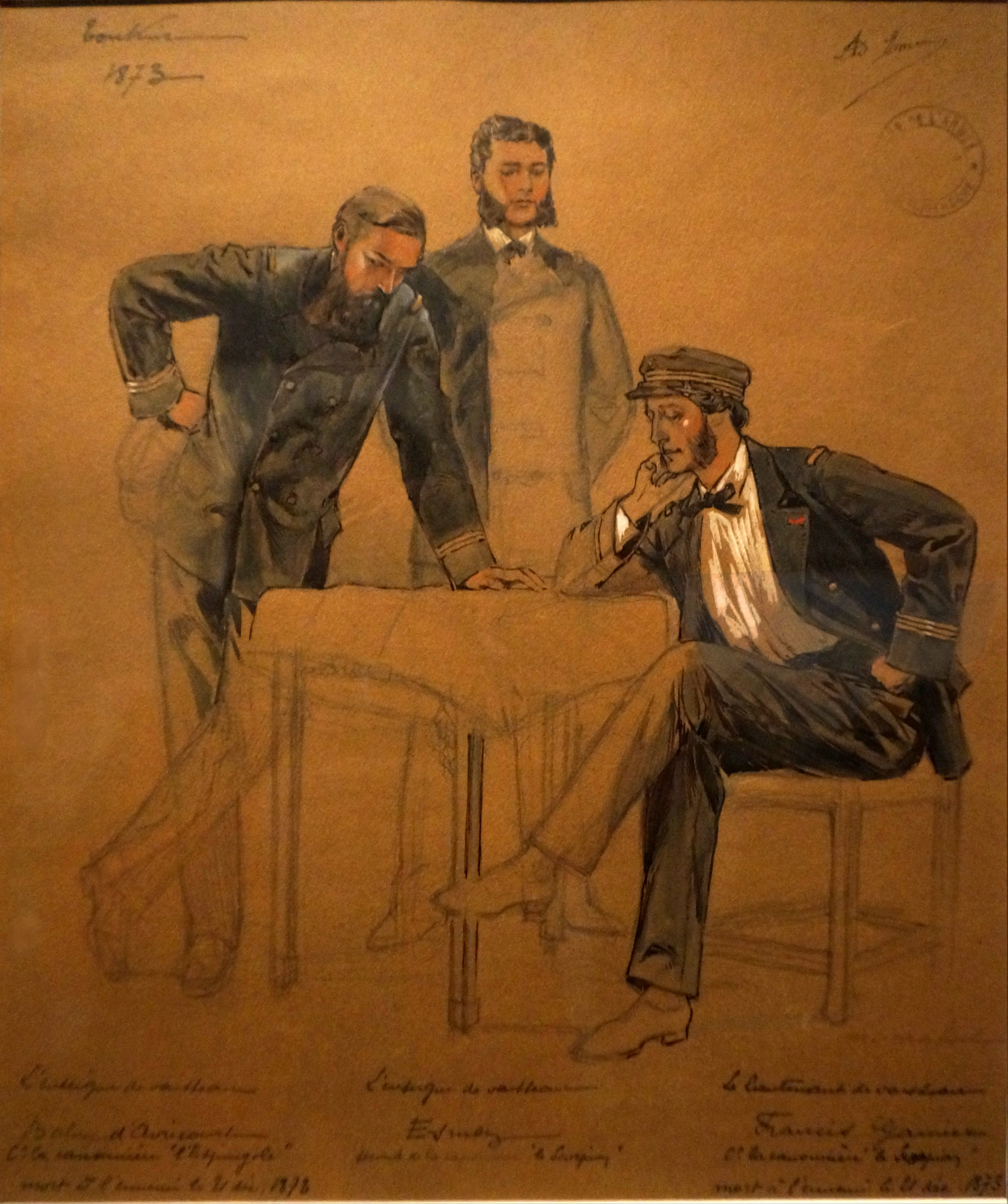
Balny d'Avricourt (left), Esmez (center) and Garnier (right)

A first group of 83 men, consisting in 51 sailors from the ships D'Estrée and Fleurus, a platoon of 30 marines of the 4th Marine Infantry Regiment and two officers traveled with Lieutenant Garnier on the corvette D'Estrée which departed from Saigon on 11 October.

The second half of the expeditionary force departed two weeks later and consisted in 60 sailors of the companie de débarquement of the corvette Decrès and four officers of that same ship who were brought to Tonkin by the Decrès, and the 28 sailors and one officer who formed the crew of the gunboat Espingole and traveled on the gunboat.

Besides Lieutenant Garnier, the expeditionary force comprised seven officers: Ensign Charles Esmez (aged 26), Ensign Henri Bain de la Coquerie (aged 28), Ensign Adrien Balny d'Avricourt (aged 24), Aspirant Marc Hautefeuille (aged 21), Aspirant Édouard Perrin (aged 21), Aspirant Georges Bouxin (aged 20), and Second-Lieutenant Edgard de Trentinian (aged 22) who commanded the platoon of marines.

Although technically not an officer, the military medic of the Espingole, Jules Harmand, was treated as a de facto officer by Balny d'Avricourt and Trentinian while they were away from the main force, as he was a well-educated man older than both of them (28 years old).

== Garnier captures Hanoi ==
=== Arrival to Hanoi ===
On the early morning of 11 October 1873, the D'Estrée left Saigon, with on its board Lieutenant Francis Garnier, commander-in-chief of the expedition, Ensign Charles Esmez, second-in-command, and the first half of the expeditionary force. The unmanned gunboat Arc was being towed by the D'Estrée.

On 14 October, while the D'Estrée was off the coast near Da Nang, a violent storm broke the tow ropes of the Arc and the unmanned gunboat went adrift for a while before capsizing and sinking. From 15 to 20 October, the D'Estrée made a halt in Da Nang, where Garnier met some Vietnamese officials from Imperial court of Huế, and also sent a telegram to Saigon in order to ask the admiralty to send him the gunboat Scorpion.

The D'Estrée arrived to the Tonkin on 23 October. The corvette remained anchored in the bay of Haiphong while Garnier and his men traveled to Hanoi upriver on local junks. On 5 November, the French party finally arrived to Hanoi. However, the welcome of the local authorities was rather cold for Garnier's liking. Neither the Governor of Hanoi, Marshal Nguyễn Tri Phương, nor any of his mandarins came to meet them.

Dupuis, however, had warmly welcomed the French. After discussing with Dupuis, Garnier became convinced that the anti-French sentiment that Nguyễn Tri Phương openly harbored ever since his defeat against French forces 12 years earlier had led him to mistreat Dupuis and that the griefs of the trader were thus justified. Garnier made some attempts to negotiate with the local authorities, but as they all remained fruitless, he began considering the idea of some military action. However, his forces were quite small, and he was still without news of the second half of his escort force.

The Espingole finally arrived to Hanoi alongside the Scorpion on 12 November. With two gunboats and the 180 men of his expeditionary force finally reunited, Garnier took the decision to capture the city. Garnier wrote a letter to Admiral Dupré to justify his attack on Hanoi and sent the D'Estrée back to Saigon to carry the letter.

=== Storming of the citadel ===
At daybreak on 20 November, the French launched their assault. A 30-man strong French detachment under Ensign Bain went with one cannon to attack the South-Western gate as a distraction. Not long after, a group of 27 marines and 48 sailors with 4 cannons under Lieutenant Garnier, Second-lieutenant Trentinian and Ensign Esmez attacked the South-Eastern gate. As soon as the first sounds of French cannons were heard, the two gunboats Scorpion and Espingole, under the leadership of Ensign Balny d'Avricourt, started shelling the Northern and the Western gates of the citadel.

The detachment under Bain swiftly captured the redan of the South-Western gate and eventually took over the gate as well after having blown up the door. Having received no order to enter however, they remained at the entrance. At the South-Eastern gate, Garnier and his men had easily taken the redan but had experienced some difficulties to blow up the door. Garnier entered first through a breach alongside Trentinian and two marines, but they had to wait until the door was blown up for the rest of the troops to get in. Once the French stormed inside, the low Vietnamese morale completely collapsed and all the defenders ran away toward the Northern gate to escape the citadel.

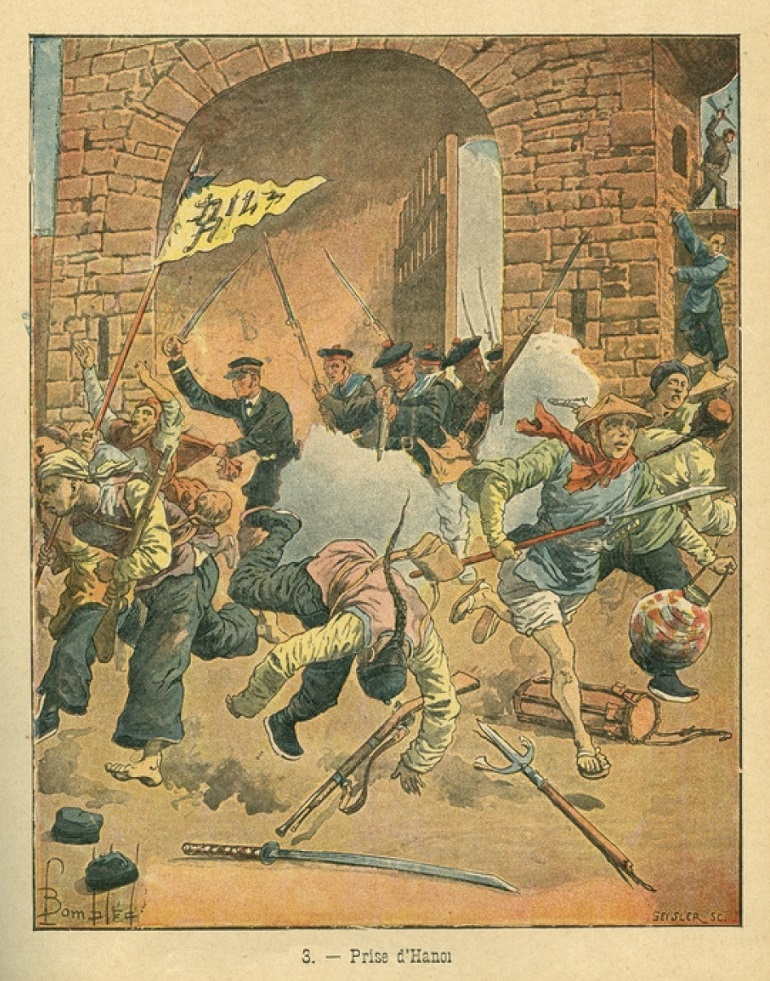
French troops entering the citadel of Hanoi

Once inside the fortress, Garnier's attention became focused on trying to prevent the important officials from escaping alongside the bulk of their soldiers. He immediately sent Aspirant Hautefeuille with some men to secure the Eastern entrance and then went to meet Bain at the South-Western entrance to order him and his men to go and watch over the Western gate.

Dupuis and 30 of his mercenaries had been tasked with monitoring the Eastern gate from outside, but they ended up taking the redan and eventually stormed inside the citadel. While inside, they met with the detachment led by Hautefeuille at the corner of a street and a Chinese mercenary was killed during a brief fusillade that resulted from the French having mistaken them for Vietnamese soldiers.

A little before 7 am, a detachment under Ensign Esmez took the great tower and hoisted the French flag at the top, signaling to French gunboats to stop firing.

In less than an hour, the French had taken the citadel, with their only casualty being a mercenary killed by friendly fire. The Vietnamese, however, had suffered over 80 dead and 300 wounded. The great General Nguyễn Tri Phương had been badly injured and captured. His son, Nguyễn Lâm, had been killed in action. The French disarmed and captured some 2,000 Vietnamese soldiers who hadn't managed to escape during the route. All the important mandarins of Hanoi had been captured, aside from the Án sát (Mandarin of Justice) who had managed to flee.

== French conquest of the delta ==
=== Capitulation of Hưng Yên ===
On 23 November, the Espingole left Hanoi, with on its board Ensign Balny d'Avricourt, Dr. Harmand, the small crew of the gunboat, as well as Second Lieutenant Trentinian and 15 of his marines. Garnier had tasked Balny with obtaining the submission of the mandarins of the fortified cities of Hưng Yên and Phu-Ly to the new order of things. By the morning of 24 November, the gunboat arrived in sight of Hưng Yên. Harmand left the ship and went, with an interpreter and an escort of four marines, to the citadel in order to meet with the mandarins. The Mandarin of Justice, second authority of the Hưng Yên province after the Governor, promised to Harmand that the Governor would come to meet Balny d'Avricourt on board the ship, adding: "You have managed to capture the great citadel of Hanoi. We will not have to audacity to attempt defending this one against you.".

Indeed, by midday the Governor and all of his mandarins were on board the Espingole, where they assured the young Ensign that they fully accepted Garnier's new established order. Balny demanded to have their submission written on paper, as a proof. The Governor consented and replied that it would be done by 3 pm. In the meantime, Balny met with the head of the local Chinese community, and tasked Trentinian with having Garnier's proclamation plastered in the city's most important streets. At 3 pm, Balny d'Avricourt marched to the Governor's Palace alongside Harmand, Trentinian and 10 marines. Upon arrival, he found out that the Governor had not yet written the official paper he had demanded. The Governor required more time and promised it would be ready by the next day. Angered, Ensign Balny replied that if it was not ready for 5 pm on that very day, he would consider him to be an enemy and treat him as such. The frightened Governor complied, and by 5 pm the paper was in the hands of the French officer.

As soon as the Governor had officially submitted, a Christian priest and the head of the Chinese community came to meet with Balny d'Avricourt to inform him about local bandits who were attacking traveling merchants in the area. Balny declined their request for help and told them that the Governor was still in charge of the province and that the task of enforcing law was his. Eventually though, the young officer gave in and promised to send Trentinian with 8 marines on the next day. However, when Trentinian went to the place where he was supposed to meet a local guide who would bring his squad to the bandits camp, no one came. After waiting for an hour, he went back to the city after having destroyed on the way a local customs post and plastered on the ruins Garnier's proclamation about free trade on the river.

=== Capture of Phủ Lý ===
On the morning of 26 November, the Espingole left Hưng Yên and set out for Phủ Lý. After a three-hours journey, the gunboat was in sight of the city. The city's fortress, located at the confluence of the river leading to Hưng Yên and Hanoi and the rivers leading to Sontay and Ninh Bình, was considered one of the most strategically important strongholds in the delta. Of about 2 km of circumference, it harboured within its walls a garrison of over 800 soldiers.

Ensign Balny d'Avricourt landed alongside Dr. Harmand, Second lieutenant Trentinian, the 15 marines present on the gunboat and 12 sailors. Soon, the squad arrived in a large street at the end of which was one of the gates of the fortress. A large cannon was pointed on the street. Fearing the Vietnamese gunners would fire on them, Balny d'Avricourt ordered his men to advance on each side of the street, near the houses, rather than at the center of it. As the French reached the gate, they noticed a large number of soldiers on the walls. Balny d'Avricourt summoned them to open the door, in response to which he was told that they were going to go fetch the Prefect. As 10 minutes had passed and no one had come, the young French officer started to grow impatient. Having no cannon with them, the French had no mean to force the door open even if they wanted to. At that moment however, Trentinian, who had climbed to the upper part of the door which was composed of a wooden grid rather than plain wood like the lower and middle parts, noticed while looking inside the fortress that the mandarins were taking their belongings and running away toward the opposite gate, followed by some of the soldiers. Trentinian immediately informed Balny, who made the decision to scale the 15 ft tall wall. Trentinian and his marines climbed up the portion of the wall to the left of the gate, while Balny and his sailors climbed the part to the right.

Once everyone was at the top, the French decided to clean the wall-walk. Trentinian went to the left with his marines while Balny d'Avricourt and his sailors went to the right. The few of the defenders who had remained on the wall made no attempt to repel the French and ran as they approached, some even jumping from the wall. The French only fired on the few who didn't drop their weapons as they ran, and thus the Vietnamese casualties were pretty low. After 10 minutes, the entire fortress was at the hands of the French, and most of the defenders were running in the nearby marshes, where some of them drowned. The Prefect was spotted in the distance as he was being carried across the marshes on his palanquin. The palanquin became a target for French rifle fire for a few minutes, until the carriers dropped the whole thing and ran. Some Vietnamese soldiers were captured, but most had escaped. In the following hours, the French also recovered some survivors from the marshes, covered with leeches.

Inside the fortress, the French found 26 cannons, a large amount of low quality rifles, a large quantity of rice grains and a massive amount of strings of cash coins, the local currency. The Espingole remained for about a week in Phủ Lý. Second lieutenant Trentinian and his 15 marines remained in the fortress while the sailors slept on board the gunboat. On 1 December, a Vietnamese man named Lê Van Ba, who had been designated by Garnier to be put in charge of Phủ Lý, finally arrived from Hanoi with his small militia force. Although originally from the Nam Định province, they had traveled to Hanoi to offer their help to the French as soon as they heard about Garnier's capture of the city. Lieutenant Garnier had named him "General" and redirected his group toward Phủ Lý after having heard about Ensign Balny's successful capture of the city. Balny d'Avricourt and the Espingole departed on 2 December to go and subdue the fortified city of Hải Dương, carrying away the entirety of French troops present in Phủ Lý, much to the dismay of "General" Ba. Before leaving however, Balny and Trentinian had spent a few hours providing basic training to Ba's men in order to give them some confidence about guarding the place alone.

=== Negotiation attempts at Hải Dương ===
After leaving Phủ Lý, the Espingole moved toward Hải Dương, first through the Luộc River and then through the Thái Bình River. The gunboat arrived in sight of Hải Dương on the morning of 3 December, a little past 9 am. When about 2 km from the city's pier, the ship got grounded. The crew soon got it back afloat, but the low water level of the river didn't allow it to get any closer.

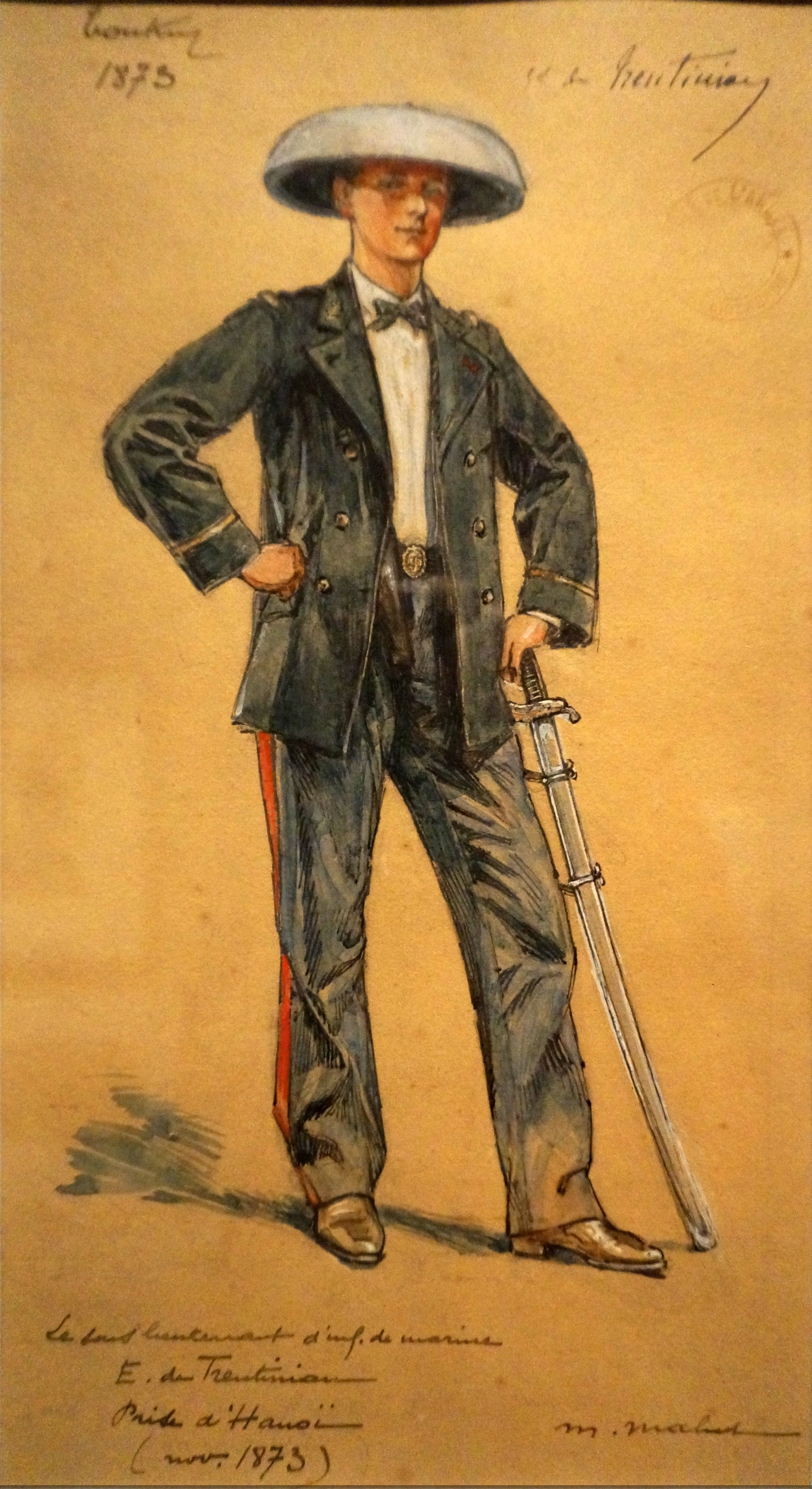
Second lieutenant Trentinian in 1873

The citadel of Hải Dương was one of the most impressive military structures in the Tonkin. Its circumference reached beyond 3 km and the walls were equipped with a large number of cannons, including modern European models. This large fortress was defended by a force of roughly 2,000 soldiers, and several small forts were located on the shore of the nearby river.

Second Lieutenant Trentinian, four marines and an interpreter went to the city on a steam launch in order to bring Garnier's proclamation to the local Governor and to receive his submission. Upon landing the small French delegation was told to wait for the Governor at some local public building. After 15 minutes though, Trentinian grew impatient and directly marched to the citadel where he demanded to be let in. While he was near the walls, Trentinian noticed some soldiers who were working on setting up tiger pits. After a short while, the guards let the French party in and brought them in front of the Governor. The old Governor Đặng Xuân Bảng politely received the French envoy and offered him some tea. Sarcastically, he remarked how "unfortunate" it was that the French gunboat had not been able to get any closer. Trentinian handed over Garnier's proclamation and explained to the Governor that Ensign Balny d'Avricourt wanted to meet with him on the Espingole. The old Governor firmly refused to go on board the gunboat. After a having attempted to convince him for a while, the young French officer eventually threatened to capture Hải Dương "like we captured Hanoi". The threat had no effect on the Governor who kept declining the demand while, according to Trentinian, remaining very polite the whole time.

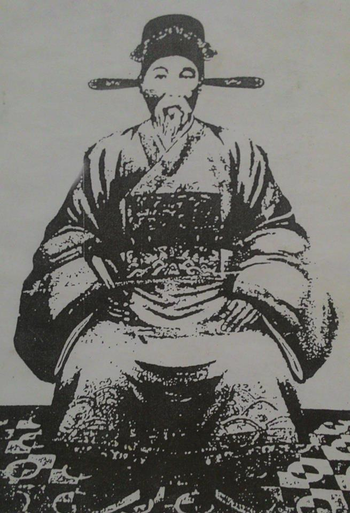
Governor Đặng Xuân Bảng

Trentinian and his men returned on board the Espingole, accompanied by some unimportant mandarin who had brought some fruits as a present for Balny. Balny refused the present and replied that if the Governor had not come onboard by 3 pm, he would be considered as an enemy. When this delay had expired, no one had come. After some concertation with Trentinian and Harmand, Ensign Balny d'Avricourt decided to take some radical action. At 3:05 pm, the Espingole opened fire on the citadel, from a distance of about 2 kilometers. Some 10 shells were fired with great accuracy and seriously damaged the citadel's great tower. Hoping that this show of force had convinced the Governor to change his mind, Ensign Balny ordered to cease fire and hopped in the steam launch with 10 men before approaching the nearest of the several forts on the shore to ask for a parley. A man was sent to him in a boat, and Balny told him to notify the Governor that if he had not come by 8 pm, the citadel would be entirely destroyed by artillery. By 6 pm, the head of the local Chinese community came to meet with Balny on the Espingole. After some discussion, Balny told them he was willing to offer an additional delay until 7 am on the next morning, but that if the Governor had still not come before this new deadline had expired, all negotiations would be broken.

The next morning near 7 am, a junk came to the Espingole. Inside was the Lãnh binh of the province and some other mandarins, but not the Governor. Thoroughly exasperated, Balny sent them away and told them that if by 8 am the Governor had not come, he would attack. As no one had come by 8:30 am, the French launched their assault.

=== Battle of Hải Dương ===
During the night, French sailors had probed the river and found a narrow passage with enough depth for the gunboat to come anchor itself about 300 meters from the first fort, which was itself located about 600 meters from the citadel. At 8:30, the Espingole opened fire on the nearest fort, in which a lot of soldiers had been arriving since the early morning. The fort immediately returned fire, but its artillery rounds flew above the gunboat. Nonetheless, it was necessary for the French to neutralize the fort as fast as possible before it could adjust its aim. A party of 15 marines under Trentinian and 12 sailors under Ensign Balny and Dr. Harmand got into two sampans and proceeded to a landing. When they were about 50 meters from the small fort, they unleashed a volley of rifle fire which soon routed the defenders.

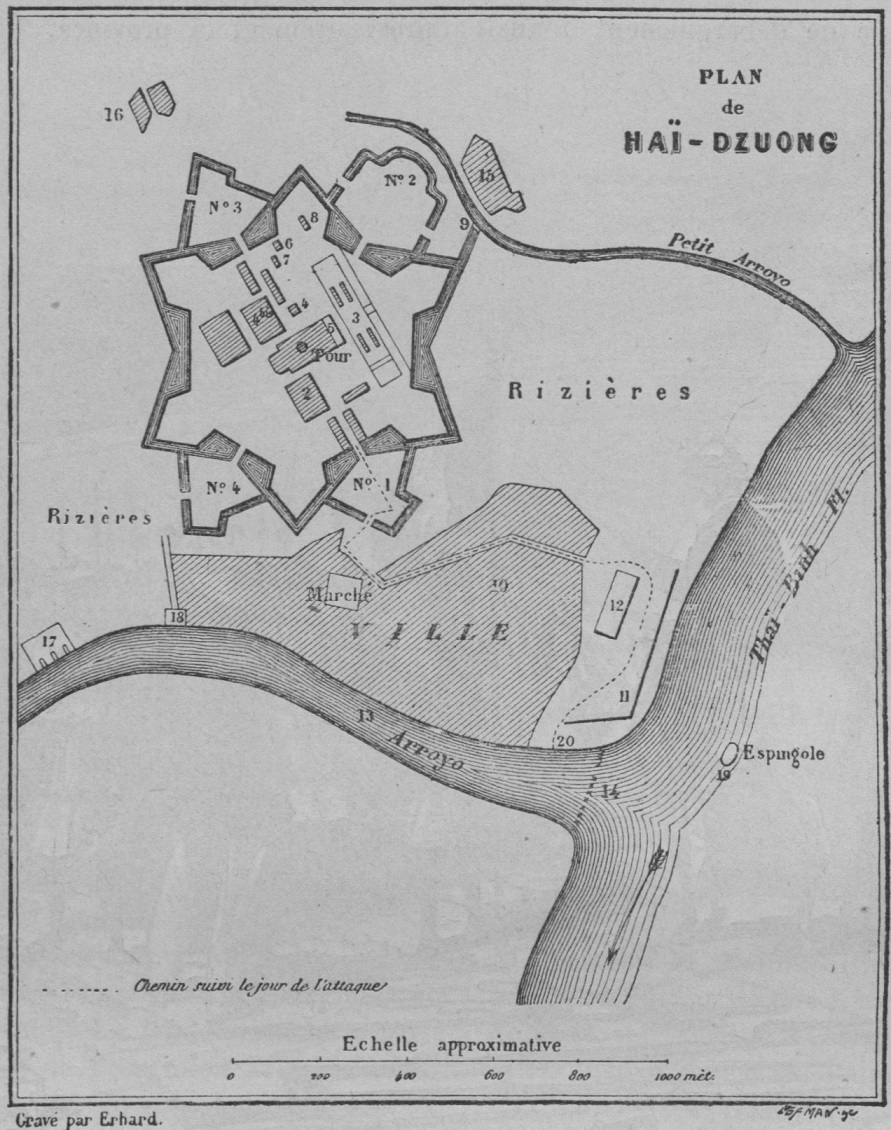
Hải Dương in 1873. The path of the French squad is depicted as a dotted line.

After having cleaned the fort, the French closed the 600 meters that separated it from the citadel, while at the same time occasionally firing on the retreating Vietnamese troops. Eventually, at the end of a street, the French found themselves in front of a redan that protected the Eastern gate of the citadel. The cannon above the gate fired on them, missing the squad by a mere dozen meters and covering them with dust. The French attempted to silence the battery with rifle fire, but seeing that the gunners were determined to reload regardless, they instead moved forward and put themselves under the cover of the redan's wall. The French then tried to break the redan's gate with axes, but eventually decided to climb its relatively small walls, giving each other a leg up to go faster and destroying the bamboo spikes at the top with their swords. At the sight of the French, all the defenders present in the redan ran away.

The defenders of the citadel's main wall, however, did not run. The French squad found itself in sight of the citadel's gate, which was separated from the redan by a moat crossed by a small bridge. From the top of the walls, four cannons dominated the place. As soon as they noticed the French, the four guns fired, almost at the same time. None of them hit, but the situation was critical for the French, and Ensign Balny decided that they would all run toward the gate after the next salvo. Under the cover of a small house, the French waited for the second salvo, which soon came and once again didn't hit anyone. As soon as the cannons had fired, the French squad rushed across the bridge and came to shelter itself under the porch of the gate, right against the door. A few men who had hesitated remained on the other side and shot at the batteries from cover.

Though protected from the defender's fire by the porch, the situation of the French was critical. They had no cannons to blow up the door nor ladders to climb the walls. A sailor managed to make a small breach in the thick wooden door with his axe, only to find out that gabions filled with dirt had been placed behind. From above the gate, the defenders were dropping stones and bricks, forcing the attackers to remain cluttered under the porch. Some rifles were sticking out of a grid at the top of the door and fired blindly above the heads of the French. While firing back on these with his own rifle, Harmand heavily damaged the wooden grid that composed the upper part of the door. Seeing this, Balny d'Avricourt hoisted himself to the top of the door and, after having manually removed what remained of the damaged part of the grid, he ran his arm through the breach and pointed his handgun at the five Vietnamese riflemen who were looking at him in disbelief on the other side. After a few seconds of hesitation from both parties, Balny fired upon them and they promptly ran away. This gave the signal of a general route among the defenders.

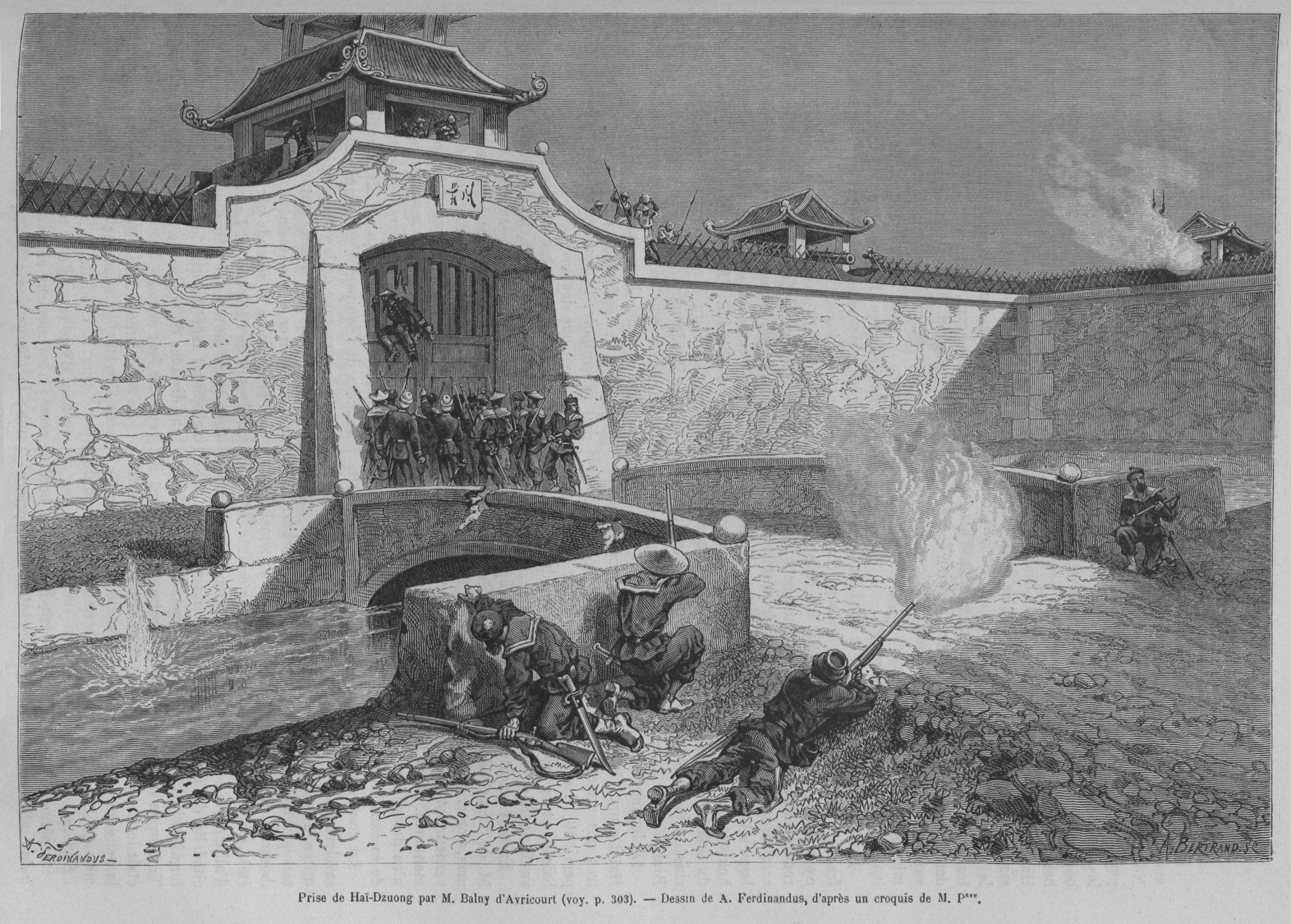
French attack on the citadel of Hải Dương

After having widened the breach a bit more, Balny pulled himself inside, soon followed by Harmand and four marines. Pulling through the narrow breach was a slow process, so Balny decided to proceed with the few men already inside and attempt to capture the Governor before he could escape. Balny went with two men toward the Southern gate, while Harmand and the two other men directed themselves toward the Northern gate. Balny found the Southern gate empty of defenders but closed. When he arrived at the Western gate however, it was wide open and scores of Vietnamese soldiers were running away through it. Balny forced some of them back inside and made them close the door. At that point, as he was isolated from the two marines who had come along with him, Balny was faced with a large group of about a hundred Vietnamese soldiers who had come to escape through the gate but had stopped in front of him when the gate was closed. In a desperate action, the French Ensign charged toward them, in reaction to which the demoralized soldiers immediately dispersed after dropping their weapons.

By 10:15 am, all the French troops were inside the citadel and the French flag was floating at the top of the great tower. In a little more than an hour of fighting, the 30-man strong French squad had captured the massive fortress without suffering a single casualty. The French captured a few hundreds of the defenders, but most of them had successfully escaped, including the Governor and all the important mandarins. Inside the citadel, the French found 80 cannons, some of them being recent models of British fabrication, several thousands spears and 1,500 rifles. Balny had not planned for the French contingent to remain in the city however, and thus he ordered most of the cannons to be spiked and had the other weapons burned, aside from 200 spears and 60 rifles that he conserved to arm the loyal militia that he intended would replace the French.

Balny d'Avricourt wrote a letter to Governor Đặng Xuân Bảng, offering to give the fortress back to him if he finally accepted to come visit him on board the Espingole. The letter remained without reply. The Espingole and its men would remain in Hải Dương until 14 December, when a letter from Garnier ordered Balny and his men to depart for Nam Định after leaving Trentinian and his 15 marines in charge of the city.

=== Capture of Ninh Bình ===
On 30 November, when the Espingole was in Phủ Lý, Trentinian was informed by the inhabitants of a nearby village that the Governor of Ninh Bình and the runaway Án sát of Hanoi were organizing to oppose the French. Some 400 additional troops had recently arrived to the fortress to reinforce the garrison, and the construction of a massive dam was underway on the river. Trentinian immediately sent a courier to Hanoi to inform Garnier about it. Garnier, who thought the Espingole would remain in Phủ Lý, sent Aspirant Hautefeuille to order Balny d'Avricourt to go and subdue Ninh Bình.

On the early morning of 2 December, Hautefeuille left Hanoi on a steam launch, alongside seven sailors and a civilian man from Saigon who served as interpreter. They had brought with them one 4-pounder cannon, six shells and 250 rifle cartridges. On the evening, they reached Phủ Lý, where "General" Lê Van Ba informed them that the Espingole had left for Hải Dương earlier that day.

Hautefeuille and his men immediately set out for the location of the dam's construction, where they arrived on the morning. As the French approached, all the workers ran away. Hautefeuille captured some low ranking mandarin from Ninh Bình who was overseeing the construction, but soon released him. The French sank the two hundreds small boats full of bricks that were gathered on the river and left.

One of the forts of the Ninh Bình citadel

As the small French troop was resting at the Catholic mission of Kẻ Sở, near Phủ Lý, Hautefeuille learned that a second dam was being built at Ninh Bình, very close from the citadel. Hautefeuille promptly decided to take care of this dam as well. Near 4:00 am on 5 December, the steam launch arrived in sight of Ninh Bình. Having heard the steam boat, many soldiers got on the walls and the French could notice them on the torch-lit parapet. Some of the defenders yelled at him, in response to which Hautefeuille fired one of his six shells on one of the forts, located on a high rock. Following this short interaction, the defenders turned off the lights and neither parties took any more action. Hautefeuille turned off the steam launch's engine and waited for the day to break.

On the early morning, after the mist has dissipated, the French could see the walls covered with soldiers. As the French were trying to move out of the cannons firing range the boiler of the old steam launch broke down, rendering the ship unusable and covering them with vapor. After having ordered his men to fix bayonets and to carry the flag, Hautefeuille hastily hopped in a canoe with six of his sailors and his interpreter, directing them toward the shore while Vietnamese soldiers were coming out of the citadel.

As the squad landed, they were swarmed with curious civilians, some even attempting to gift an ox to the French officer. Hautefeuille and his men then marched with firm steps toward the citadel's gate, and were soon surrounded by Vietnamese soldiers who marched alongside them while pointing their spears and rifles toward them without daring to attack first, probably hoping to catch them alive. As they arrived near the moat, Hautefeuille noticed the province's Governor Nguyễn Vũ, and instantly recognized him as such due to his four parasols.

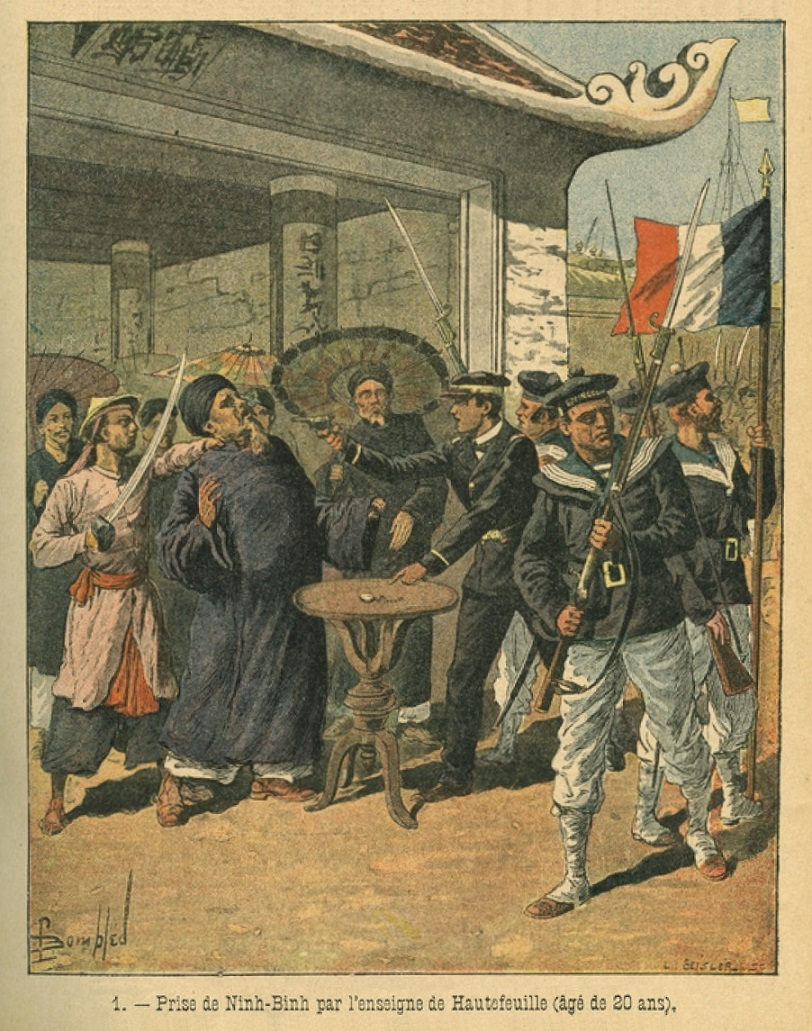
The capture of Ninh Bình by Aspirant Hautefeuille and his sailors

With his pistol in hand, Hautefeuille asked the Governor what his stance on Garnier's proclamation was. The Governor replied that he whole-heartedly supported it, in response to what the young French officer pulled out a written order he had taken from the mandarin at the dam two days earlier, which ordered the conscription of villagers to build dams. The Governor was quite embarrassed, and Hautefeuille demanded to have a written proof of his submission. The Governor consented, but when Hautefeuille demanded to enter the fortress alongside him to witness the writing however, Governor Nguyễn Vũ firmly objected it.

As a response, Hautefeuille suddenly grabbed the Governor by the collar and, after having put his watch on the nearby table, he held his handgun on the Governor's temple and threatened to blow his brain out if all the local mandarins plus the runaway Án sát of Hanoi had not been gathered within 15 minutes to enter the citadel alongside them. Some of the Vietnamese soldiers around them had moved forward at the sight of this scene, but they immediately pulled back when French sailors took aim.

Thirteen minutes later, all the mandarins had been gathered and they entered the citadel alongside Hautefeuille and his men at 7:44 am. Instead of bringing to Governor to his palace to write the letter of submission, the young officer had him and the other mandarins tied up, and sent a sailor to hoist the French flag on the citadel's tower. Following, he placed the Governor at a table with some paper to sign a capitulation under the watch of four of his sailors, while he himself went with the province's Lãnh binh (general), the two remaining sailors and his interpreter to visit the citadel. As he came back, the Án sát of Ninh Bình had managed to flee and the Governor now refused to take responsibility for the capitulation alone, out of fear about consequences. Hautefeuille declared him a prisoner of war and jailed him in the fort on the high rock. The 1,700 defenders of the fortress were promptly ordered to leave the place without their weapons, which they readily did.

The amount of weaponry captured was quite massive: 46 cannons, a dozen of swivel guns, hundreds of rifles, thousands of spears and a large amount of gunpowder. In the vault of the citadel, Hautefeuille also found a very large amount of strings of cash coins. Hautefeuille promptly started administrating the province and appointed new mandarins. On the day following his takeover, dozens of the former defenders came back to enlist themselves into his service, but half of them deserted the next day following a false rumor about the imminent arrival of a 5,000-man strong Imperial army from Thanh Hóa.

Garnier briefly visited Ninh Bình on 9 December and left Hautefeuille in charge of the province. During the month he spent administrating this large province, Hautefeuille paid visits to the city and neighboring villages with just his interpreter and no escort and squandered a large share of the strings of cash coins found in the fortress by distributing them to random villagers he met.

=== Battle of Nam Định ===
Back in Hanoi, Garnier and Dupuis had decided to attack Sơn Tây, where Prince Hoàng Kế Viêm was staying alongside his army and the Black Flag warriors he had hired. However, a letter from some Christian missionary of Nam Định reached Garnier on 4 December, informing him that the Imperial authorities of the city were inflicting a harsh repression on the numerous pro-French Christian natives of the area. Garnier decided to postpone the capture of Sơn Tây and departed for Nam Định with 70 sailors and 15 marines on the Scorpion.

On 7 December at dusk, the Scorpion reached Phủ Lý. A letter from Ensign Bain, who had been left in charge of Hanoi with 30 sailors and Dupuis and his mercenaries, informed Garnier that the Black Flags based in Sơn Tây were regularly conducting raids on villages in the vicinity of Hanoi. Garnier dispatched his 15 marines to rejoin Hanoi overland, and then departed for Ninh Bình the next morning.

On 9 December, the Scorpion arrived to Ninh Bình. Having heartily congratulated his young subordinate for the capture of the city, Garnier replaced his 7 sailors with 10 others and took his cannon, before departing for Nam Định on the morning of 10 December. At the confluence of the Đáy River and the Sông Nam Định River, the gunboat came under the fire of three forts. After a two hours long artillery battle, the forts were abandoned by the surviving defenders and captured by French troops, who then destroyed the remaining cannons before returning on board the Scorpion. On the next morning, the French resumed their journey toward Nam Định, with some of their troops placed in two sampans towed by the Scorpion.

Near 9:00 am, they came in sight of Nam Định, a city of 50,000 inhabitants and one of the most important fortresses in the delta. As they approached, a Vietnamese battery the French had not noticed opened fire and hit the gunboat's armored bow, barely causing any damage. At the same moment, the citadel opened fire as well, but most of its shots missed the gunboat. Only one round managed to cause some light damage to one of the ship's mast. Meanwhile, suppressive fire from French sailors on the foretop had silenced the Vietnamese battery. Aspirant Bouxin and 20 sailors then landed on the shore and eliminated the gunners before spiking the guns and returning on board. A short while later, Bouxin and his sailors landed again with one cannon, near the south of the city. Garnier has tasked them with attacking the Southern gate to create a distraction. A large area without any cover separated the small party from the walls, and the defenders had focused a considerable amount on their forces on this side. For a while, the French sailors moved toward the walls despite the rain of artillery rounds and bullets flying around them, but after one of them was seriously injured, they retreated.

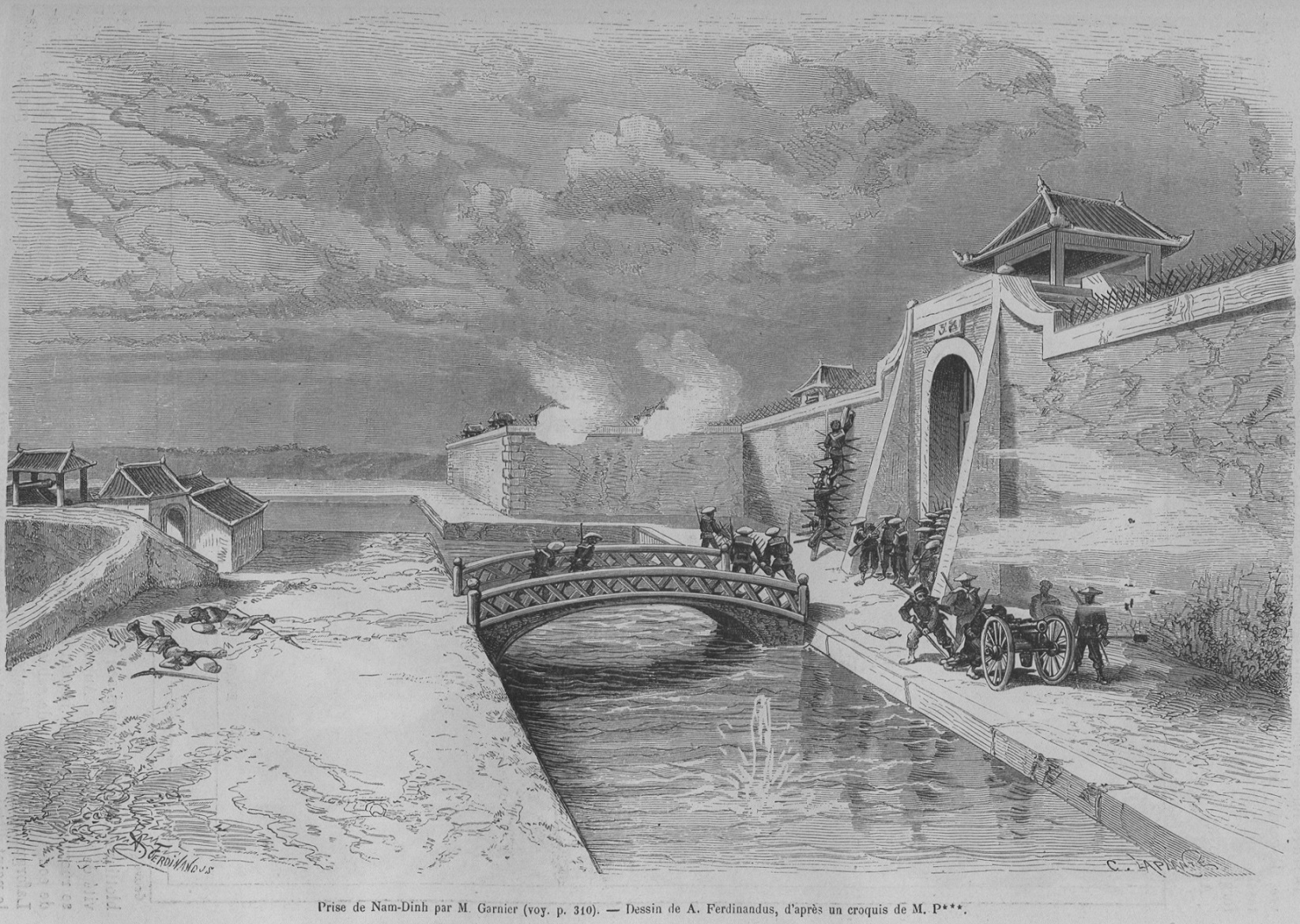
Garnier and his men storming the citadel of Nam Định

In the meantime, the Scorpion closed by the citadel. Its main gun, nicknamed Le Porte-Désolation ("Bringer of Desolation") by the sailors, unleashed a frightening rain of shells on the fortress. The citadel returned fire with its cannons, but all of their shots flew well above the gunboat. Garnier ordered the landing of another party located in the second sampan, led by hydrographer Bouillet. However, the impulse was not strong enough, and the sampan stopped before reaching the shore. Unexpectedly, a group of local civilians who were watching the artillery battle from the shore sent a rope to the French and dragged the boat to them.

A few moments later, Garnier himself landed near the Eastern gate with 15 sailors and the cannon he had taken from Hautefeuille two days earlier. They were soon joined by Bouillet's detachment and together they stormed and took the redan separating them from the gate. As he was about to use the cannon to blow up the gate, Garnier noticed some dirt falling from a small gap at the top of it. He immediately understood the defenders had completely jammed the entrance from inside. Realizing that attempting to blow up the jammed gate was useless, he ordered the cannon to be used for suppressive fire on some portion of the wall to his right where the fire from the defenders was particularly intense. Some chevaux de frise were located on a small bridge between the redan and the gate, which gave Garnier the idea of using them as a ladder in order to climb the wall. Once the chevaux de frise were positioned against the wall, the dauntless French lieutenant was about to go first, but a seaman named Robert, who had taken part in the capture of Ninh Bình with Hautefeuille, insisted to take the lead. The moment the French appeared at top of the wall marked the signal of a general rout, and most of the defenders escaped through the Southern gate. Though they suffered no fatalities, the French experienced their first casualties since the beginning of the expedition as five men were wounded, some of them seriously.

With the fall of Nam Định on 11 December, the French became the uncontested masters of the entire Red River Delta and its 7 millions inhabitants. In a mere three weeks, the small expeditionary force had conquered the greater part of the Tonkin region.

On 12 December, Garnier ordered Ensign Esmez to depart for Hanoi with the Scorpion in order to land 15 men there before going on the coast to meet with the D'Estrées that had recently returned from Saigon. In the meantime, Garnier had recalled Balny d'Avricourt and the Espingole from Hải Dương. After having left the city under the leadership of Trentinian, Balny and the gunboat departed for Nam Định on 14 December and reached it on the next day.

Garnier left Nam Định and the whole province, which counted over a million inhabitants, under the command of Doctor Harmand and 25 sailors, and returned to Hanoi on the Espingole alongside the rest of his men.

== Attack of 21 December on Hanoi ==
=== Black Flags attack on the citadel ===
Garnier arrived to Hanoi on 18 December. After some concertation with Dupuis, he decided to capture Sơn Tây to put an end to their annoying raids on the outskirts of Hanoi. However, an unexpected delegation of officials from the Imperial Court in Huế arrived to Hanoi on the evening of 19 December to negotiate a peace with him. Garnier cancelled his planned attack on Sơn Tây and proclaimed a truce, which was made known to Sơn Tây.

While Garnier was negotiating a peace with the Imperial envoys on 21 December, the army of Sơn Tây, about 2,000 Vietnamese soldiers under Hoàng Kế Viêm, came in sight of Hanoi. With them were some 600 Black Flag troops. The Black Flags immediately came to attack the citadel, while the Vietnamese army remained about a kilometer behind them. Among the Vietnamese army, the French noticed an elephant, which indicated the presence of important officials. From the cover of a small village, about 200 meters from the walls, the Black Flags opened fire on South-Western part of the citadel with their rifles and swivel guns.

Expecting an attack from several sides, Garnier promptly sent Ensign Bain and 30 men to defend the Northern portion of the walls. Unwilling to use the citadel's outdated guns, he also sent Aspirant Perrin and a few men to fetch a French cannon and bring it on the side that was being attacked. The firepower of the French cannon immediately caused great disarray among the attackers. A shell exploded in the middle of the Vietnamese army that had remained in the distance, causing it to retreat in panic. The Black Flags, however, withdrew at a slow pace, while continuing to fire as they retreated. A lot of them had been killed by the French cannon, and many corpses covered the ground in front of the walls. Only one French soldier had been wounded in the attack so far.

=== French counter-attack ===
Lieutenant Garnier, however, was not satisfied with this defensive victory. Willing to deal a decisive blow to the Black Flags, he organized a counter-attack. After having sent Ensign Balny d'Avricourt and his usual 12 sailors toward the west to flank the enemy, he himself proceeded with 18 men and a cannon toward the village of Thủ Lệ, located about 1.2 km south-west from the citadel, where the Black Flags had temporarily stopped their retreat. While the two French squads moved in their respective directions, the cannon on the wall bombarded Thủ Lệ.

As Garnier and his small squad marched at a steady pace toward Thủ Lệ across a rice field, their cannon got mired in the swampy soil. Impatient, Garnier left the cannon under the guard of Petty officer Castagnet and two seamen and resumed the advance, now at jogging pace. The French gun on the citadel's wall, which had the whole time been firing on Thủ Lệ above the heads of the French detachment, was now forced to cease fire to avoid hitting them. As they reached Thu-Lê, Garnier sent Sergeant Champion and half of the squad to secure the village, while he ran with the rest of the men toward a mound near the village, at the top of which he had seen a group of Black Flag troops disappear on the other side.

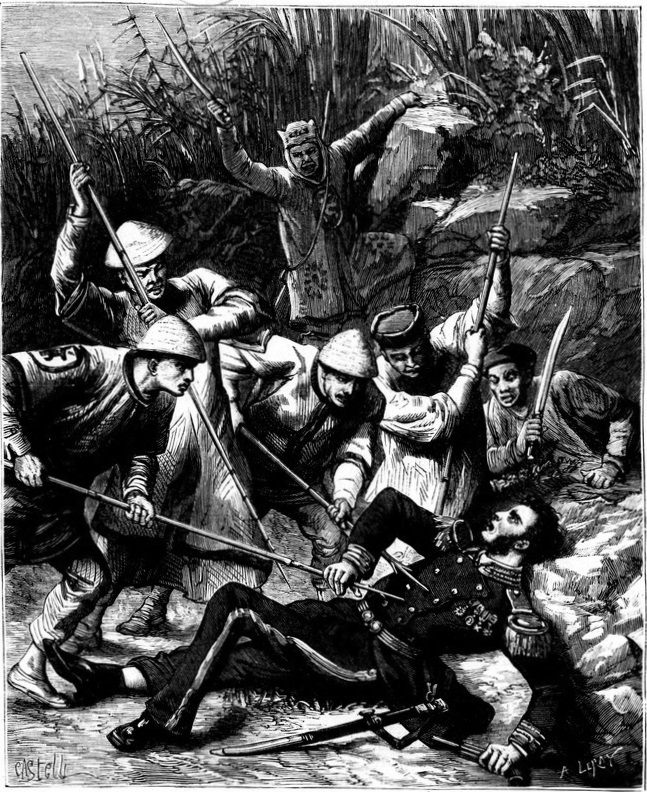
The death of Francis Garnier

Garnier ran up the mound yelling to his men: "À la baïonnette, en avant!". Only three men, one sailor and two marines, managed to keep up with their frenetic leader: Seaman Dagorne, Corporal Guérin and Private Laforgue. As they reached the top of the mound though, a volley was fired at them by Black Flag soldiers who were waiting for them from the other side. Dagorne was killed instantly by a bullet to the heart; Guérin was wounded to the face, and Laforgue stopped his advance. Garnier, however, kept moving forward while unloading his handgun on the Black Flags as they disappeared in a small bamboo grove. As he reached the bottom of the mound, his feet tripped in a small dip on the ground and he fell down.

Immediately, Black Flag soldiers came out of the grove and pierced the unfortunate French commander with their spears and swords, while others fired at his two comrades who had remained at the top of the mound. Although heartbroken about the fate of their leader, Guérin and Laforgue turned their back and retreated toward Champion and the rest of the squad in the village. The Black Flags had followed them and a firefight ensued. The French squad retreated toward their artillery piece remained in the rice field and the Black Flags didn't pursue them. A short while afterward, the men returned to the village. The Black Flags had completely left the area and continued their retreat. At the mound, the French found the mutilated corpses of Garnier and Dagorne without their heads, that the Black Flags had carried away with them as trophies.

In the meantime, Ensign Balny d'Avricourt and his 12 men had been involved in a violent firefight, in which a sailor had been wounded. Another one, Seaman Bonifay, was missing in action. As the events at Thủ Lệ were unfolding, Balny and his men had returned to the walls to fetch some ammunitions, which were lowered to them with a rope. As the squad was returning to their last position to look for Bonifay, they came across Dr. Chédan, the medic of the Scorpion. He had come out to join Garnier, but unaware of where to find him, he decided to join Balny d'Avricourt's party instead.

As they arrived to a village of about 3 km from the wall, they found the beheaded corpse of Bonifay. Enraged by this sight, Balny ordered to advance toward a dike behind which the Black Flags were hiding, near the Đền Voi Phục pagoda. When the French squad approached, the Black Flags unleashed a volley on them, killing Seaman Sorre and wounding two other sailors. As the Black Flags came out of their cover in large numbers, Balny emptied his handgun on them before unsheathing his sword, but he was soon overwhelmed and killed while the rest of the French squad retreated.

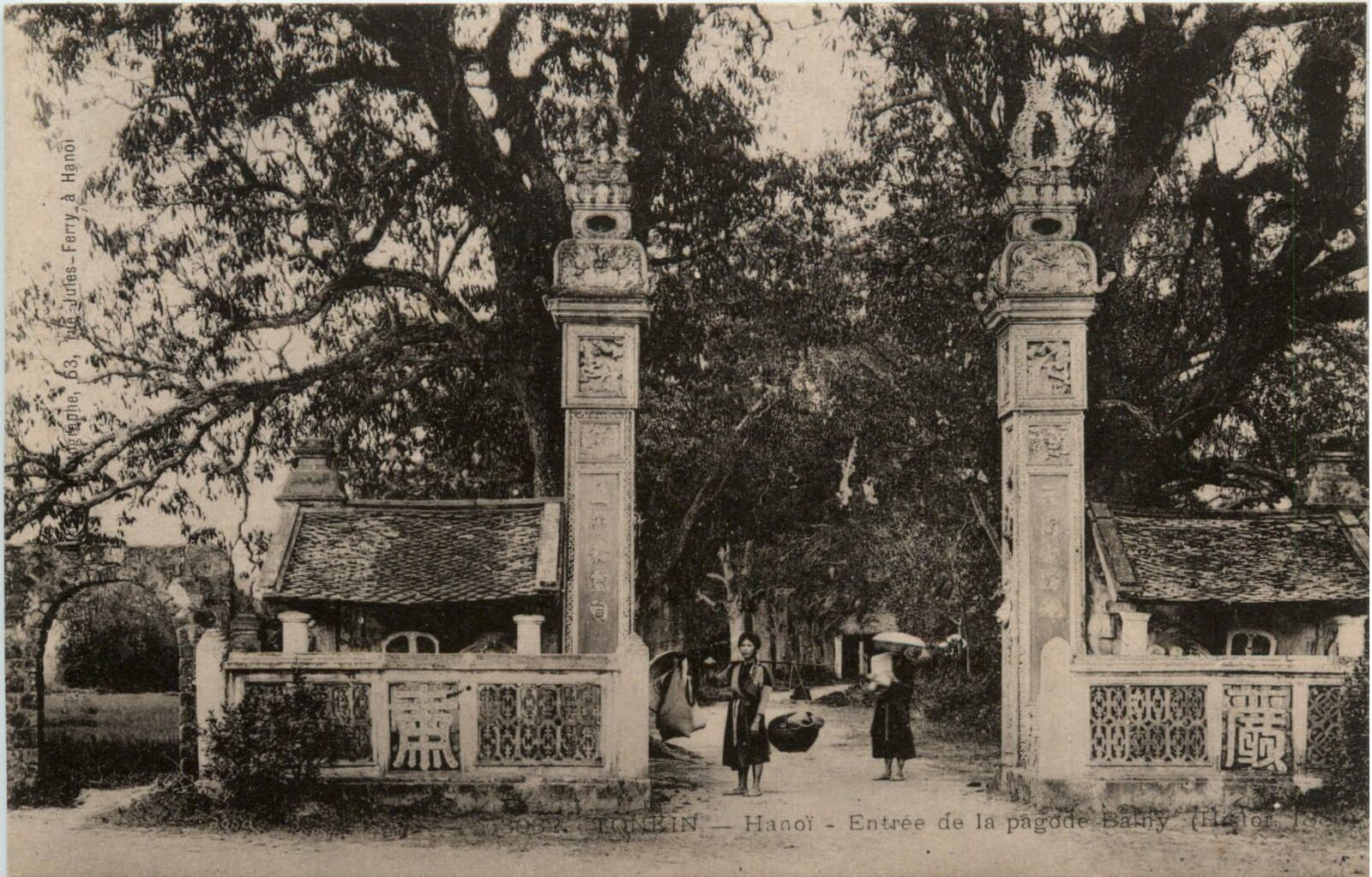
The pagoda where Ensign Balny d'Avricourt was killed

Chédan and the seven men remaining fit for combat took the two wounded and retreated toward the pagoda, from the cover of which they engaged in a firefight with the Black Flags, who eventually disengaged and withdrew. The French squad then returned to the citadel with the headless body of Bonifay, but without those of Balny d'Avricourt and Sorre, that had been carried aways by their enemies.

The Black Flags and Vietnamese troops subsequently retreated back to Sơn Tây, bringing back with them the heads of Garnier and Balny d'Avricourt. Their failure to retake Hanoi was somewhat compensated by the great strategic success that could be seen in the elimination of both the conquest's mastermind and one of his main officers. Though deeply affected by the loss of their charismatic leader, Garnier's men nevertheless remained in control of the region.

Ensign Esmez, who had returned with the Scorpion on 25 December, assumed command of the expeditionary force and carefully organized the defense of the Hanoi in anticipation of further attacks. However, no further attack on Hanoi occurred, as the Imperial officials in Sơn Tây didn't feel like attacking again after their route and the Black Flags were in no shape to mount an attack alone after the relatively heavy casualties they had sustained on 21 December. Esmez and the Imperial mandarins briefly resumed the interrupted negotiations, but they stopped shortly afterward when they were informed about the imminent arrival of a new French diplomatic envoy and an Imperial ambassador from Huế alongside him.

== Philastre's intervention ==
In the early 1870s, the French government was still focused on the recent defeat against Prussia and remained firmly opposed to any colonial war abroad. With the recent border change, the Belfort Gap left a dangerous opening in France's border fortifications, and no colonial venture was to be undertaken until this new border had been fully secured.

When he found out about how Garnier's expedition had turned out, Admiral Duprés, who feared an angered reaction from the Minister of Colonies, was very embarrassed. On the day he learned about the capture of Hanoi by Garnier, he immediately wrote a letter to the Minister, in which he expressed regret about how the "excessive boldness" of his diplomatic envoy. The admiral then dispatched Lieutenant Paul-Louis-Félix Philastre to replace Garnier in Hanoi. Philastre was a friend of Garnier and had often served as diplomat at the Imperial Court in Huế. When on 6 December, Philastre received a letter informing him of the capture of Hanoi, he promptly wrote to Garnier:

Have you thought about the shame that will befall upon you when it will be known that, having been sent to expel some ruffian, you allied yourself with him to attack people who hadn't caused you any harm?

— Paul Philastre (6 December 1873),

Garnier never got to read the letter however, as he was already dead by the time it reached the Tonkin.

On 7 December, Lieutenant Philastre departed from Saigon in order to replace Garnier as diplomatic envoy in the Tonkin and to put an end to his unsanctioned campaign. Philastre left Saigon on the Decrès, but made a stop of several days in Huế to meet with Imperial officials. Philastre arrived to Haiphong on 24 December, alongside Nguyễn Văn Tường from Huế.

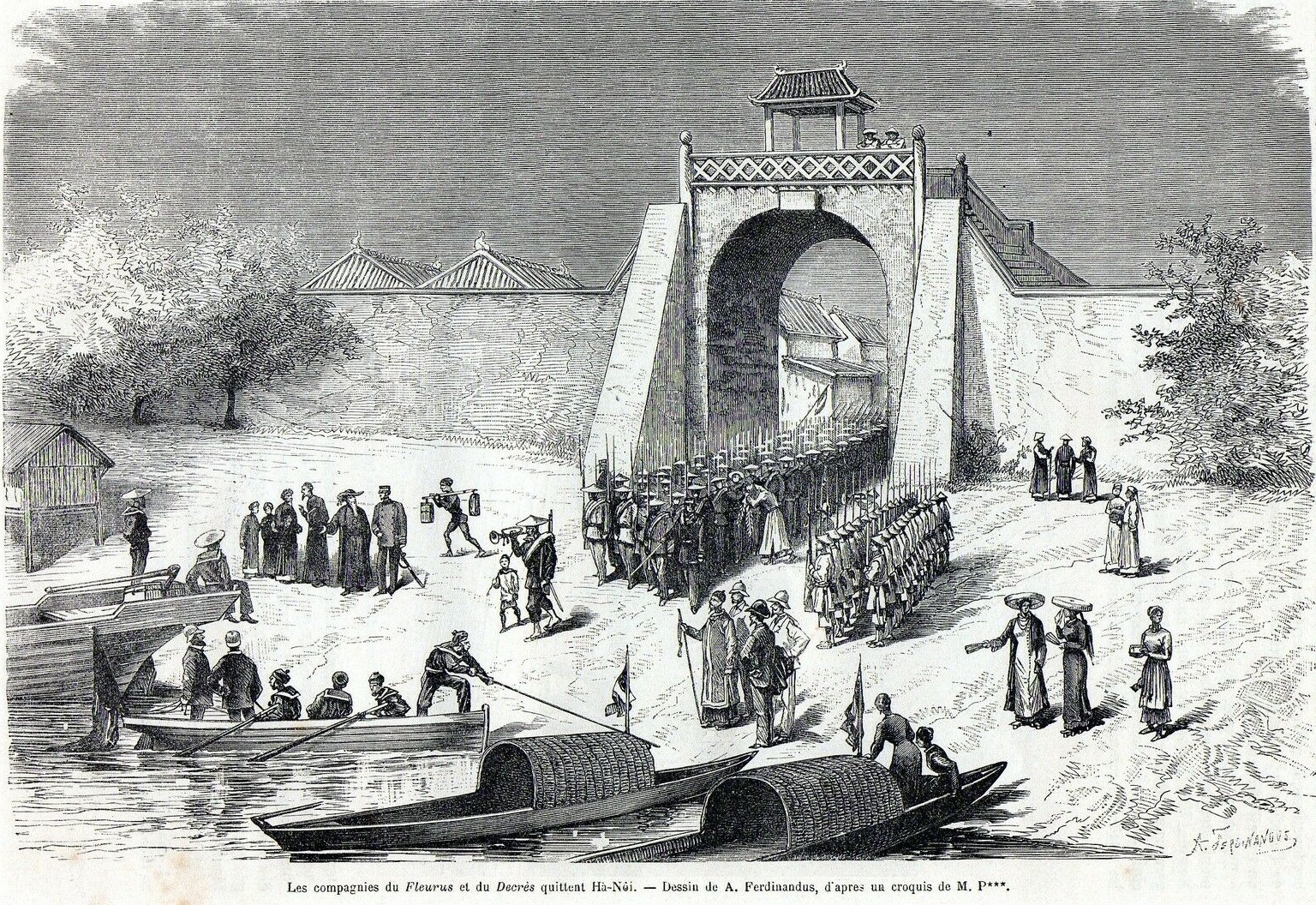
French troops leaving Hanoi in February 1874

On 29 December they reached Hải Dương and Philastre ordered the evacuation of the conquered cities. Trentinian tried to convince Philastre to consider the dire consequences that would await the locals who had collaborated, but his appeals were rejected. On 2 January, Philastre, Nguyễn Văn Tường, Trentinian and the 15 marines who had been occupying the citadel departed together for Hanoi on a steamboat.

On 5 January, Philastre and Nguyễn Văn Tường signed a preliminary convention that would serve as draft for the official treaty that was to be signed later in Saigon. The bodies Balny d'Avricourt and Sorre of were returned to the French on 4 January, while the five severed heads were returned on 6 January.

On 8 January, the Scorpion came to remove Hautefeuille and his 10 sailors from Ninh Bình. Frustrated by this unforced withdrawal, the young officer had all the guns of the citadel destroyed and threw the powder stock in the river before he left. On 10 January, the Scorpion arrived to Nam Định and removed Harmand and his 25 men. Dupuis and Esmez protested Philastre's decisions and a heated argument ensued, in which Philastre stated that Garnier had acted like a "pirate" and that he would most definitely have been court-martialed had he not perished. All the men of the expeditionary force were gathered in Hanoi and eventually left the city on 6 February.

== Aftermath ==
The Treaty of Saigon was signed on 15 March 1874. In exchange for France having returned the captured provinces, the Nguyễn Empire officially recognized all the French possessions in Cochinchina, opened the Red River to French trade and allowed the establishment of French Residences in Hanoi, Haiphong and Qui Nhơn.

Over the course of this short undeclared war, the French expeditionary force had lost 5 men, including two of the highest-ranking officers, all of them killed during the counter-attack of 21 December: Lieutenant Garnier, Ensign Balny d'Avricourt, Seaman Dagorne, Seaman Bonifay and Seaman Sorre. Several men had also been wounded, including 5 during the battle for Nam Định and 6 on 21 December. The French expeditionary force left Hanoi on 6 February and was replaced by a small force of 40 men garrisoning the French Residence of Hanoi as part of the treaty.

Following the withdrawal of French forces, a large number Christian locals and Lê Dynasty supporters who had enthusiastically collaborated with the conquerors for political or religious reasons were massacred by the Imperial authorities. Many officials were also dismissed and the head of the Chinese community of Hải Dương, who had actively collaborated with Balny d'Avricourt and Trentinian, was stripped of all his belongings and deported to Guangdong.

The lighting conquest of a large chunk of the country by a ridiculously small French force gone rogue, and the humiliating treaty that ensued dealt a serious blow to Emperor Tự Đức's already declining prestige. In the same way, the brutal French withdrawal and the dramatic consequences that resulted for those who had supported the conquerors considerably reduced the popular support for France in the region, and when the French invaded again a decade later, they were met with much less enthusiasm from the locals.

== Legacy ==
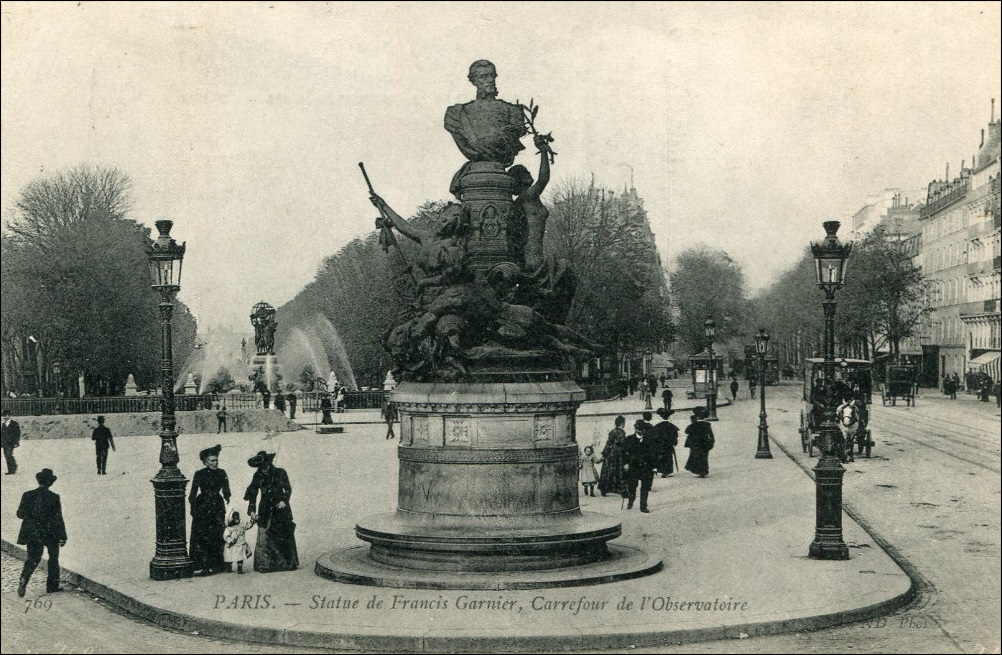
Monument to Francis Garnier in Paris, erected in 1898

Initially, Garnier's behavior was completely disavowed by the French government. When Admiral Duprès, who still respected the unfortunate lieutenant despite having distanced himself from his actions in Tonkin, requested for him to be posthumously promoted to captain to ensure a decent pension for his widow, the request was rejected. So were his request of awards for the men who had accomplished impressive feats during the campaign. In 1874, a request by the city of Saint-Etienne, Garnier's birthplace, for the erection of a statue in his memory was denied by the government.

However, Garnier gained a lot of popularity in France within the decade that followed his death. His impressive conquest and his tragic death made him a romantic figure, and some French, British and American contemporaries compared the 1873 conquest to the military exploits of Francisco Pizarro and his conquistadores. Several French Navy ships were named after him, notably a gunboat commanded by his former subordinate Marc Hautefeuille during Tonkin Campaign.

During the siege of Tuyên Quang in 1884–1885, the Black Flags taunted the French garrison by yelling the name of Garnier.
