= Marc Hautefeuille =

French naval officer

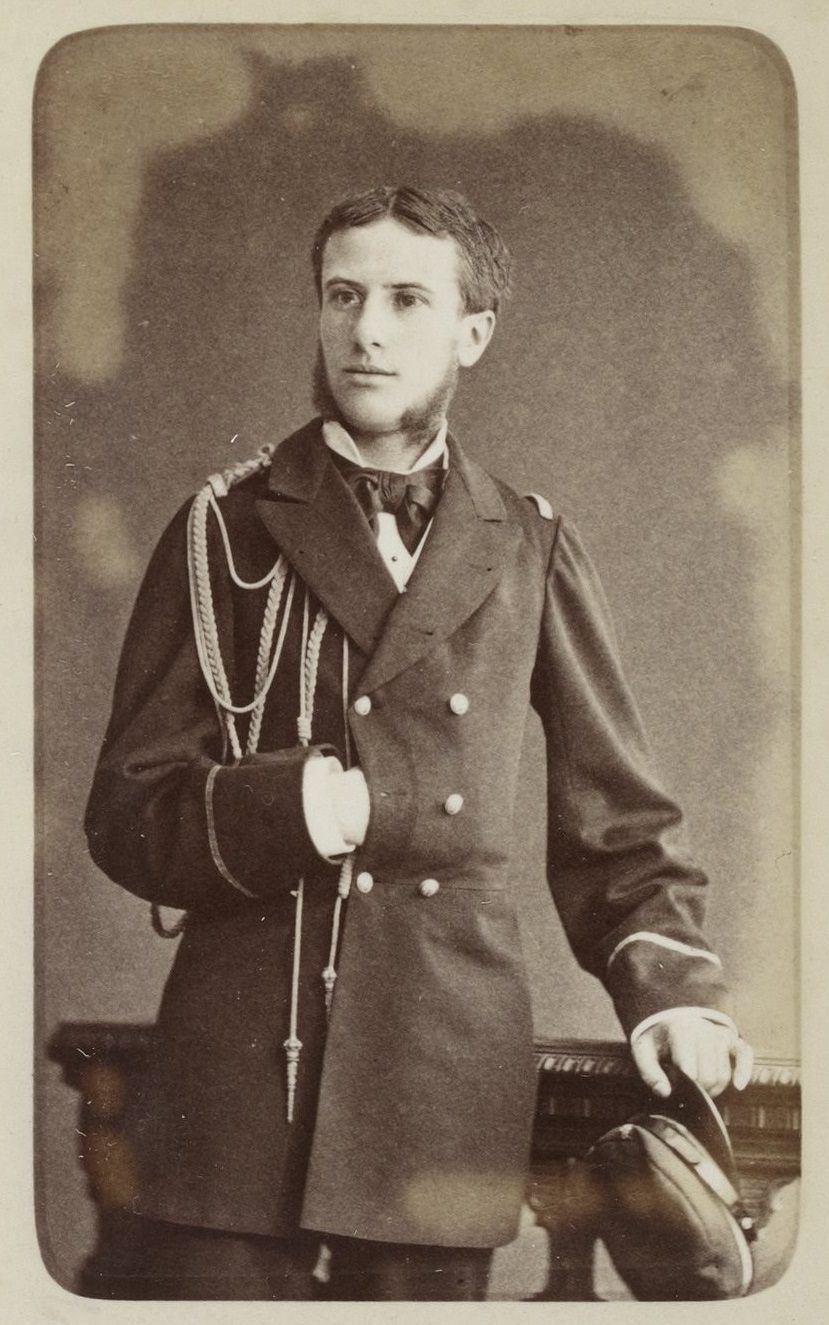
- Hautefeuille as an ensign in 1874.
- Born: Marc Gilbert Paul Hautefeuille; 1 January 1852; Cormelles-le-Royal, France
- Died: 29 November 1923 (aged 71); Paris, France
- Military career
- Allegiance: (French Third Republic) France
- Branch: French Navy
- Service years: 1868–1909
- Rank: Rear admiral
- Conflicts: Franco-Prussian War; Garnier Expedition; Tonkin Campaign
- Awards: Legion of Honour

Marc Gilbert Paul Hautefeuille (1852–1923) was a French naval officer, who also served as the governor of Monaco from 1909 to 1910. He is chiefly remembered for his bold capture of Ninh Bình when he was serving as a young aspirant under Lieutenant Garnier during the French expedition in Tonkin in late 1873.

== Early life ==
Marc Hautefeuille was born on 1 January 1852 in Cormelles-le-Royal, Normandy.

He joined the École navale in 1868, at the age of 16, and fought in the Franco-Prussian War of 1870. In October 1871, he was promoted to aspirant. He was then stationed in French Cochinchina where he served on the corvette Decrès.

== Garnier Expedition ==
Between November 1873 and February 1874, Hautefeuille was part of the French Expeditionary Force in Tonkin led by Francis Garnier. Although it was originally supposed to be a peaceful expedition, it soon turned into a full blown conquest of the region when Garnier lost patience after failed negotiations with the local governor.

On 20 November, Garnier attacked the citadel of Hanoi with the 180 men of his expeditionary force. Garnier split the French into three groups. Hautefeuille entered the citadel through the south-eastern gate alongside Garnier and the main French force. The small detachment of sailors he was leading became responsible for the sole "French" casualty of the battle when they accidentally killed an allied Chinese mercenary, after having briefly mistaken them for Vietnamese troops.

After the capture of the city, Lieutenant Garnier unilaterally declared the Red River open to French trade and sent Ensign Adrien Balny d'Avricourt with the gunboat Espingole to receive the submission of the fortified cities of Hưng Yên and Phủ Lý. After havin subdued the cities, Balny d'Avricourt and the Espingole left Phủ Lý on 2 December to go and subdue the city of Hải Dương at the east of the delta.

Meanwhile, in Hanoi, Garnier had been informed that the Governor of Ninh Bình and a runaway mandarin from Hanoi were organizing to resist the French and building dams on the river. On 2 December, Garnier dispatched Hauefeuille, then a 21 years old aspirant, on steam launch with a 4-pounder cannon, seven sailors and an interpreter to deliver an order to attack Ninh Bình to Ensign Balny d'Avricourt in Phủ Lý.

=== Capture of Ninh Binh ===
When the steam launch reached Phủ Lý on the evening, Hautefeuille was informed that Balny and the Espingole had departed for Hải Dương earlier that day. He was also notified of a large dam that was being built nearby and immediately decided to go and destroy it.

Hautefeuille and his men arrived to the construction site on the next morning. When the French landed, all the workers, local villagers conscripted to forced labor, ran away. Hautefeuille and his men sank the boats loaded with bricks that had been gathered on the river and left. On the evening of 4 December, while resting with his men at the Catholic mission of Kẻ Sở, Hautefeuille was informed that another dam was being erected down the river, very close from the city of Ninh Bình. He promptly decided to take care of this one as well, and at 11:00 pm, he set out for Ninh Bình on his steam launch alongside his seven sailors, his interpreter and a local civilian to guide them to the city.

The steam launch arrived in sight of Ninh Bình near 4:00 am. Despite the pitch-dark night, many soldiers got on the walls at the sound of the steam launch and started yelling at the French. Hautefeuille responded by firing one of the six shells of his 4-pounder on a fort. The Vietnamese extinguished their torches immediately. Hautefeuille turned off the steam launch's engine and neither parties took any more action, waiting for the day to break.

On the morning, the French could notice several hundreds of soldiers looking at them on the walls. As the steam launch tried to move out of the citadel's cannons firing range, the boiler broke down, rendering the ship unserviceable. Hautefeuille promptly hopped inside the ship's small dinghy with six of his sailors and his interpreter and directed himself toward the shore, while the citadel's guns fired a few unsuccessful rounds at them.

Upon landing, the small squad was immediately swarmed with curious villagers. Hautefeuille and his men marched with firm steps toward the citadel's gate, and were soon surrounded by Vietnamese soldiers, who proceeded to march alongside them while pointing their spears and rifles, without daring to initiate hostilities. As they arrived near the citadel's moat, Hautefeuille noticed the province's Governor, Nguyễn Vũ.

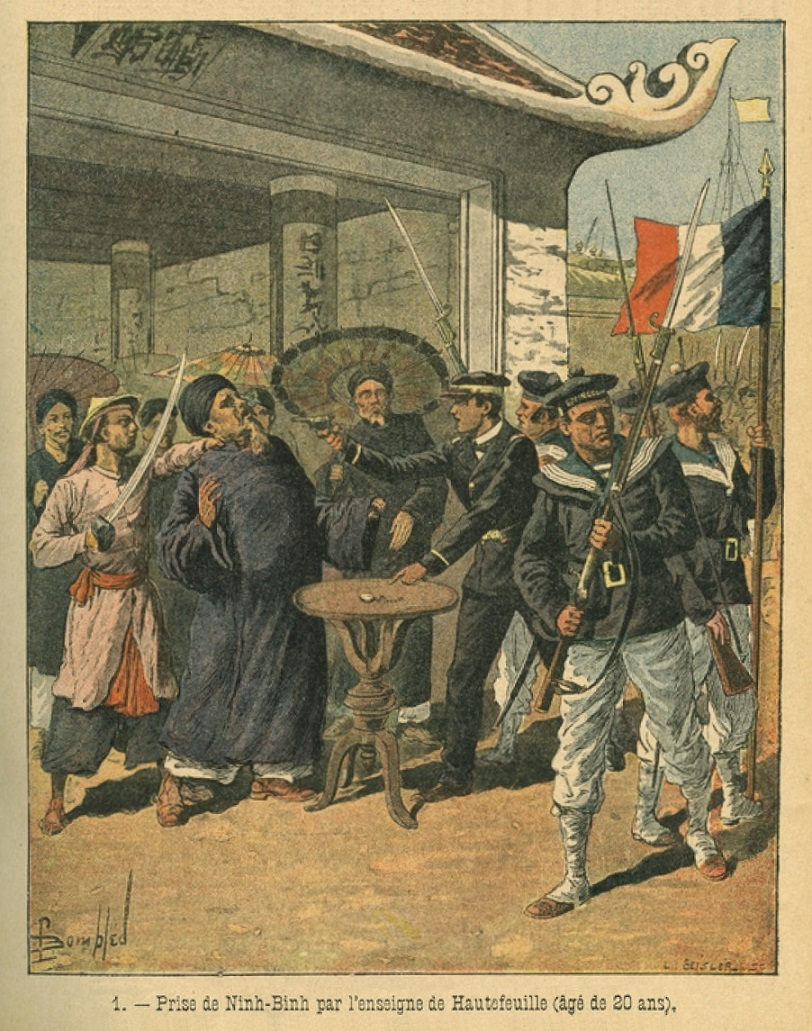
Hautefeuille and Governor Nguyễn Vũ. Caption contains minor mistakes about his rank and age at the time.

With his handgun in hand, Hautefeuille apologized for having shelled the fort, claiming it was in response to having been yelled at. A short negotiation ensued, but soon turned fruitless when the Governor firmly refused to give in to Hautefeuille's demands to enter the citadel. Losing his patience, Hautefeuille suddenly seized the old Governor by the collar and held his handgun on the Governor's temple, threatening to blow his brain out if all the local mandarins, plus the runaway mandarin of Hanoi, had not been gathered in front of him within the next 15 minutes. Some of the Vietnamese soldiers around them had moved forward at this sight, but they instantly pulled back when French sailors took aim.

Thirteen minutes later, at 7:44, all the mandarins had been gathered and they entered the citadel alongside Hautefeuille and his men. The Governor and the other mandarins were kept as prisoners of war, while the 1,700 defenders of the citadel were disarmed and sent away. With the capture of the citadel, Hautefeuille and his seven men had effectively taken control of the city, as well as the entire province. Garnier briefly visited Ninh Bình on 9 December and left Hautefeuille in charge of the province after having replaced his 7 sailors with 10 different ones.

During the month he spent administrating this large province, Hautefeuille paid visits to the city and neighboring villages with just his interpreter and no escort, and squandered a large share of the strings of cash coins found in the fortress by distributing them to random villagers he met.

Embarrassed by the sight of locals kneeling and bowing when encountering him like they used to do with previous governors, Hautefeuille had them replace this traditional reverence with the military salute. Within a week every villager he came across, men, women and children, saluted him by bringing their hand to their forehead.

In late December, Lieutenant Philastre, who had been sent by the admiral to terminate Garnier's unsanctioned campaign, arrived to the Tonkin and ordered the evacuation of the conquered cities. On 8 January, the gunboat Scorpion came to remove Hautefeuille and his 10 sailors from Ninh Bình. Enraged by this unforced withdrawal, the young officer had all the guns of the citadel destroyed and threw the powder stock in the river before he left.

Hautefeuille's boldness and bravery left a strong impression on the inhabitants of the province. Following the French withdrawal, a revolt broke out in the Ninh Bình and Nam Định provinces as Lê dynasty restorationists rose up against Nguyễn rule. Three letters were sent by rebels to Hautefeuille, proposing to make him General-in-chief of the revolt if he accepted to lead them into battle. Being bound by his allegiance to the French navy however, Hautefeuille had to decline, and the revolt was crushed after a few months.

== Later career ==
Hautefeuille was promoted to ensign on 17 March 1874 and then to lieutenant in 1881.

He was part of the French force that conquered Tonkin a decade after Garnier's aborted expedition, and notably distinguished himself in the operations of Bac Ninh in March 1884, during which he earned the Legion of Honour.

In 1890 he was stationed in Senegal, where he commanded the aviso Ardent. In 1896 he was stationed to Saint Petersburg, where he was promoted to the rank of commander. Following his stay in Russia, Hautefeuille took the weird habit of always converting into rubles to count money, no matter where he was on Earth and what the local currency was.

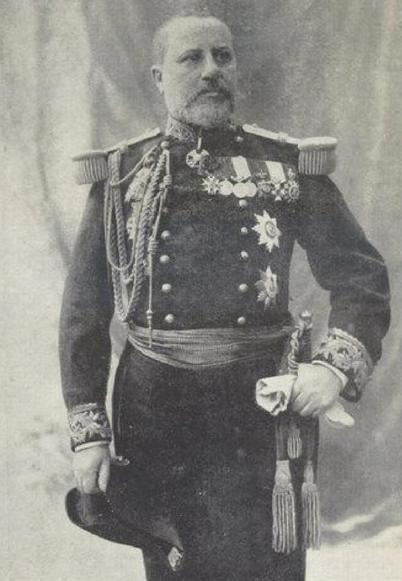
Commander Hautefeuille in 1905

Between 1901 and 1904 he was stationed to Oran in French Algeria. Hautefeuille harbored a strong dislike for Zouaves, a famous infantry unit that consisted of European French troops dressed in fancy Oriental uniforms and whose flamboyant reputation earned them a certain popularity among women. One day, Hautefeuille almost got himself challenged to a duel after having told a mounted Zouave officer he came across in a street that he couldn't decide which one of the two animals was the finest.

In 1905 he commanded the cruiser Catinat and was appointed to commander of the French Pacific Fleet. Admiral Jean Decoux, who served as an aspirant on the Catinat at the time, later described Hautefeuille as an excentric man, who was prone to bursts of anger but who also showed some touching paternal affection for his men. Ducoux notably recounted an occurrence in which Commander Hautefeuille gathered his sailors on the deck and then proceeded to distribute sweets and chocolates to each of them, while dressed in his colorful pajamas and wearing his monocle. Another time, as the Catinat was about to leave Tahiti, Hautefeuille organized a party and invited local vahinés on board the ship.

According to Decoux, Hautefeuille was pretty mediocre at navigation, and every journey under him was "epic and uncertain". Decoux recounted how, one night, Hautefeuille came close from accidentally driving the cruiser ashore on Tetiꞌaroa, as the route he had chosen went straight across the atoll.

In July 1909, just before his retirement, Hautefeuille was promoted to the rank of rear admiral.

== Later life and death ==
In 1909, Prince Albert I of Monaco, whom Hautefeuille had befriended as they fought together during the Franco-Prussian War, appointed him Governor General of the principality, hoping that he could appease the tensions that were on the rise in the small nation. However, Hautefeuille's peculiar policies actually worsened the popular anger and after a year he had to sneak away through a window at night as an angry mob had gathered in front of the palace. On 2 February 1911, Albert bestowed upon Hautefeuille the Order of Saint-Charles.

Hautefeuille then moved to the 17th arrondissement of Paris, where he lived a bourgeois life alongside fellow retired Navy veterans until his eventual death in 1923.
