= Treaty of Saigon =

Treaty of Saigon may refer to:

- Treaty of Saigon (1862), between France and Vietnam
- Treaty of Saigon (1874), between France and Vietnam
