= Marie Jules Dupré =

French colonial administrator (1813-1881)

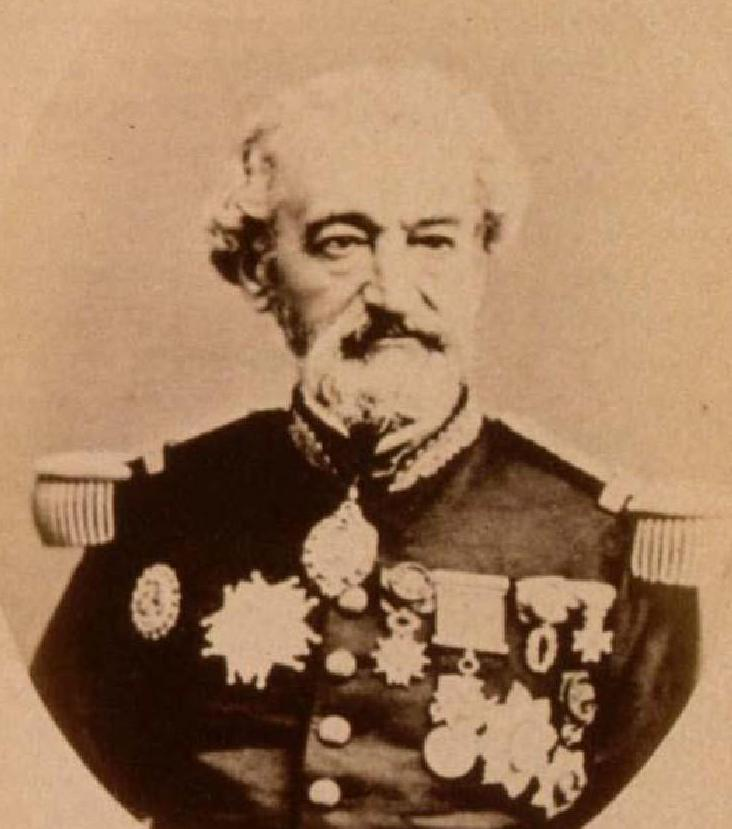

Governor of Réunion de 1865 à 1869
- In office 4 January 1865 – 23 October 1869
- Monarch: Napoleon III
- Preceded by: Rodolphe Darricau
- Succeeded by: Louis Hippolyte de Lormel

Governor of Cochinchina
- In office 1 April 1871 – 15 March 1874
- President: Adolphe Thiers; Patrice de MacMahon
- Preceded by: René de Cornulier-Lucinière
- Succeeded by: Jules François Émile Krantz

Personal details
- Born: 25 November 1813 Albi, Tarn
- Died: 8 February 1881 (aged 67) Paris, France
- Occupation: Naval officer

Marie-Jules Dupré (French pronunciation: [maʁi ʒyl dypre]; 25 November 1813 – 8 February 1881) was a French admiral. He was governor of Réunion from 1865 to 1869 under the Second French Empire, and governor of Cochinchina from 1871 to 1874 under the French Third Republic. He negotiated a treaty with the Emperor of Vietnam that opened up the country to French commerce and ceded territory in the south to France.

== Life ==
=== Early career (1813–54) ===
Marie-Jules Dupré was born on 25 November 1813 in Albi, Tarn. His father was an army officer. He attended the École Navale and graduated in 1831 as a midshipman. In 1847 Dupré was promoted to lieutenant commander. He fought in the Antilles between 1848 and 1851.

=== Commander and Admiral (1854–71) ===
Dupré was promoted to commander in 1854. He fought in the Crimean War, then served in the expeditions to Syria and Saigon. In 1861 Dupré concluded a commercial treaty with Radama II, King of Madagascar. He was Governor of Réunion from 1864 to 1869. As governor of Réunion he was always helpful to scientific researchers, and in return the Madagascan fruit bat (Eidolon dupreanum) was named in his honour. In 1867 he was promoted to rear admiral. In 1870 Dupré participated in the French blockade of Chinese and Japanese ports. The French were trying to keep these ports closed to the Germans. Dupré was present at the Tianjin Massacre.

=== Cochinchina (1871–74) ===
Dupré was Governor of Cochinchina from 1 April 1871 to 16 March 1874. (Note: Charles Joseph Basher d'Arbaud was acting lieutenant governor of Cochinchina from 16 March 1872 to 16 December 1872.) The French were recovering from the Franco-Prussian War, saw little value in the colony of Cochinchina and were against expanding their colonial empire. Dupré disagreed, and saw great potential for France in Vietnam. He strengthened the Native Affairs Service, promoted primary education and introduced compulsory vaccination. He established new schools including the Collège de Stagiaires, in which Annamese officials were trained for the French administration. He preferred to avoid major changes to the local laws, based on the Chinese system, since this could cause unrest and possibly revolt.

Despite several requests by Dupré the French government did not want to further extend their power in the region. In 1873 the Vietnamese objected to use of the Red River route to China by the French trader Jean Dupuis. Dupré ignored government instructions and dispatched Francis Garnier with a naval force to Hanoi, where it captured the Imperial Citadel of Thăng Long. Dupré was concerned that British and German enterprises on the China coast would intervene to block French access to China via Tonkin. He seems to have given Garnier the mandate of attempting to establish a colonial base in Tonkin, but his written orders did not include instructions to this effect since that would have been against French official policy. After the initial success Garnier was killed and the expeditionary force returned from Tonkin.

Dupré next dispatched Paul-Louis-Félix Philastre to negotiate a treaty with the Emperor of Vietnam, Tự Đức. In 1874 Tự Đức ratified the treaty, under which the French could trade with Haiphong, Hanoi and Qui Nhơn, a step towards annexation of the whole of Vietnam ten years later. The treaty ceded the southern provinces of Vĩnh Long, Châu Đốc and Hà Tiên to the French.

=== Last years (1874–81) ===
The French government disapproved of Dupré's views and actions and recalled him to France. He was maritime prefect of Rochefort, Charente-Maritime and then of Toulon. He retired in 1878. Dupré died in Paris on 8 February 1881.

== Publications ==
Publications by Dupré include:

- Dupré, Marie-Jules (1863), Trois mois de séjour à Madagascar / par le capitaine Dupré, Paris: L. Hachette, p. 284

== Sources ==
- Beolens, Bo; Watkins, Michael; Grayson, Michael (2009-10-07), The Eponym Dictionary of Mammals, JHU Press, ISBN 978-0-8018-9533-3
- Corfield, Justin (2014-11-01), Historical Dictionary of Ho Chi Minh City, Anthem Press, ISBN 978-1-78308-333-6
- Keat Gin Ooi (2004), Southeast Asia: A Historical Encyclopedia, from Angkor Wat to East Timor, ABC-CLIO, ISBN 978-1-57607-770-2
- Louvet, Louis-Eugène (1885), La Cochinchine religieuse (in French), Paris: E. Leroux
- Marie-Jules Dupré (1813-1881) (in French), _Bibliotheque nationale de France
- Marie-Jules Dupré, Encyclopaedia Britannica, 20 July 1998
