= Nguyễn Tri Phương =

Vietnamese politician (1800–1873)

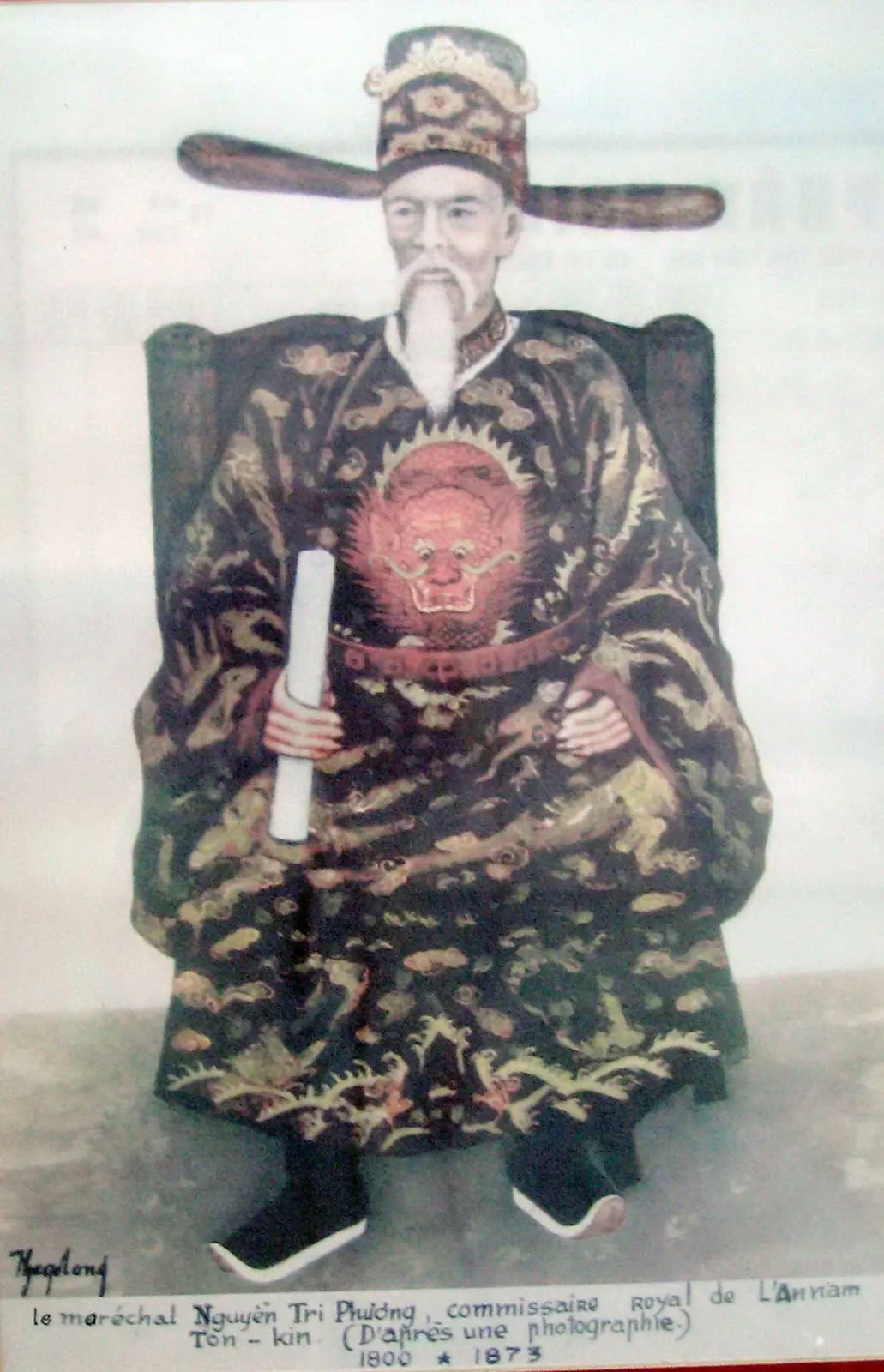
- Born: 1800; Thừa Thiên Huế
- Died: 1873 (aged 72–73); Hà Nội province
- Children: Nguyễn Lâm

Nguyễn Tri Phương ( chữ Hán: 阮知方, 1800 – 1873), born Nguyễn Văn Chương, was a Nguyễn dynasty mandarin and military commander. He commanded armies against the French conquest of Vietnam at the Siege of Tourane, the Siege of Saigon and the Battle of Hanoi (1873).

== Early years ==
Nguyễn Tri Phương was born in 1800 in Ðường Long village, Chánh Lộc canton, Phong Ðiền district, Thừa Thiên fu, now is Chí Long village, Phong Chương commune, Phong Ðiền district, Thừa Thiên Huế.

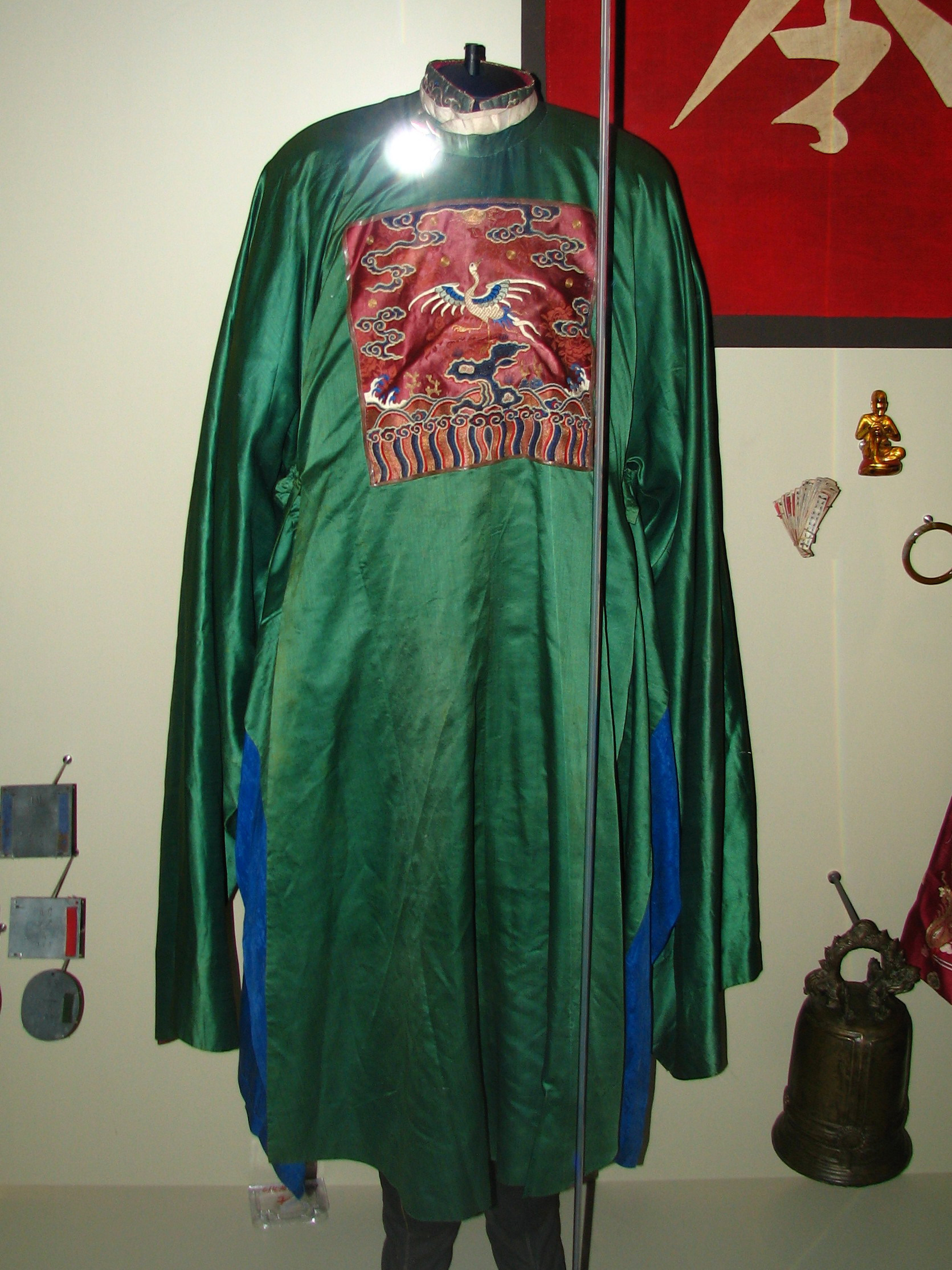
Court dress of Nguyễn Tri Phương seized by French as trophy after the Battle of Hanoi (1873), now displayed at Les Invalides.

Born in a peasant family, Nguyễn did not go to school, but with intelligence, high self-study and self-reliance, he made a great career. Starting from an official at the district level, due to his talent, he was promoted to the court, was recruited and in turn held many important positions during the three reigns of Minh Mạng, Thiệu Trị, and Tự Đức.

Phương had risen quickly in military ranks after recapturing Hà Tiên and defeating the Siamese army at Châu Đốc. He succeeded Trương Minh Giảng in 1841 as viceroy of King Thiệu Trị (reigned 1841–1847) in Southern Cochinchina. He then became a senior advisor to the next emperor Tự Đức (reigned 1847–83).

== Battle of Hanoi (1873) ==
He was wounded and captured by the French in Battle of Hanoi (1873). He refused to be treated by French and began a hunger strike, dying shortly afterwards. His ceremonial dress was taken as a trophy by Francis Garnier.

== Legacy and memory ==
He was venerated alongside Hoàng Diệu by the Vietnamese people as loyal subjects who sacrificed themselves for Vietnam. Many cities and streets in Vietnam were named after him.
