= Treaty of Saigon (1874) =

Treaty between France and Vietnam

The Treaty of Saigon was signed on 15 March 1874 by the Third French Republic and the Nguyễn dynasty of Vietnam. Vietnam made economic and territorial concessions to France, while France waived a previous war indemnity and promised military protection against China. The treaty effectively made Vietnam a protectorate of France.

== Background ==
The treaty was negotiated by Paul-Louis-Félix Philastre for France and Nguyễn Văn Tường for Vietnam, which in the treaty is called the Kingdom of Annam. In French circles, the treaty was often called le traité Philastre. Following the Garnier Affair, in which a French force nominally aiding the Vietnamese government had wreaked havoc in Tonkin in December 1873, Philastre took control of the French expedition on 3 January 1874 and immediately began the withdrawal from Tonkin, completed by the end of February. His success put him in a strong negotiating position.

== Terms ==
The terms of the treaty established peace and a military alliance between Vietnam and France. Vietnam ceded to France the three provinces south and east of the Mekong that had been occupied by France since 1867. They were incorporated into the French colony of Cochinchina. The Red River was opened to international trade, as were the ports of Hanoi, Haiphong and Qui Nhơn. The French were permitted to post a consul in each of these ports as well as in Huế, the capital of the Nguyễn. In exchange, the French waived the remainder of the war indemnity imposed by the Treaty of Saigon that ended the Cochinchina Campaign in 1862. They also gave Vietnam five ships with cannons and rifles.

The most important terms of the treaty seem to have been understood differently by the parties. France recognized "the sovereignty of the king of Annam and his complete independence from any foreign power" (la souveraineté du roi d'Annam et son entière independence vis-à-vis de toute puissance étrangère). The foreign power in view was China, of which Vietnam was a tributary. France also offered to provide military assistance against any enemy if Vietnam requested, in exchange for which Vietnam would conform its foreign policy to that of France. Taken together, these terms amounted to Vietnamese renunciation of Chinese suzerainty and acceptance of a French protectorate, although the latter term was not used. Neither Vietnam nor China appears to have understood these terms in this way. Neither did France seek to take advantage of them before 1879.

== Impact ==
The governor of Cochinchina, Admiral Marie Jules Dupré, who had authorized both Garnier's disastrous expedition and Philastre's cleaning up operation, requested his own recall soon after and brought a copy of the treaty back to France. His main concern had been recognition of the 1867 occupation effected by his predecessor, Admiral Pierre-Paul de La Grandière, and this had been accomplished.

France requested Vietnam to inform China of the treaty, but neither power did so immediately. In May 1875, the French chargé-d'affaires in Peking informed Prince Gong in a note in which he also requested the Chinese government to stop armed bandits entering Tonkin from its territory and to open a port for trade along the Red River in Yunnan. At the time the Black Flags, an armed group of Chinese, was in control of the upper Red River, rendering the clause opening it to trade inoperative. In his response, Prince Gong, aware of the implications of the treaty, restated China's claim to suzerainty over Vietnam.
