= Phan Thanh Liêm =

Vietnamese soldier (1833–1896)

Phan Thanh Liem
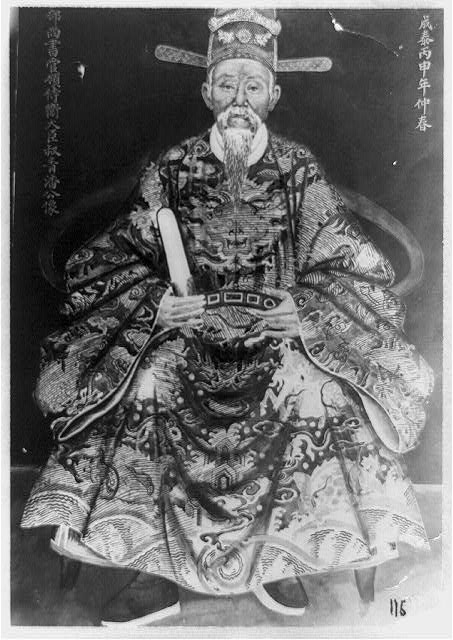
- Born: August 29, 1833; Ba Thanh village, Biên Hòa
- Died: 1896 (aged 62–63); Cochinchina, Vietnam
- Organization: Nguyễn dynasty

Phan Thanh Liêm (潘清簾, August 29, 1833 – 1896), was a Vietnamese soldier, politician, nationalist and (anti-French) independence activist.

He was the son of Phan Thanh Giản.

== See also ==
- France-Vietnam relations
