= Jean Dupuis =

French trader and explorer (1829–1912)

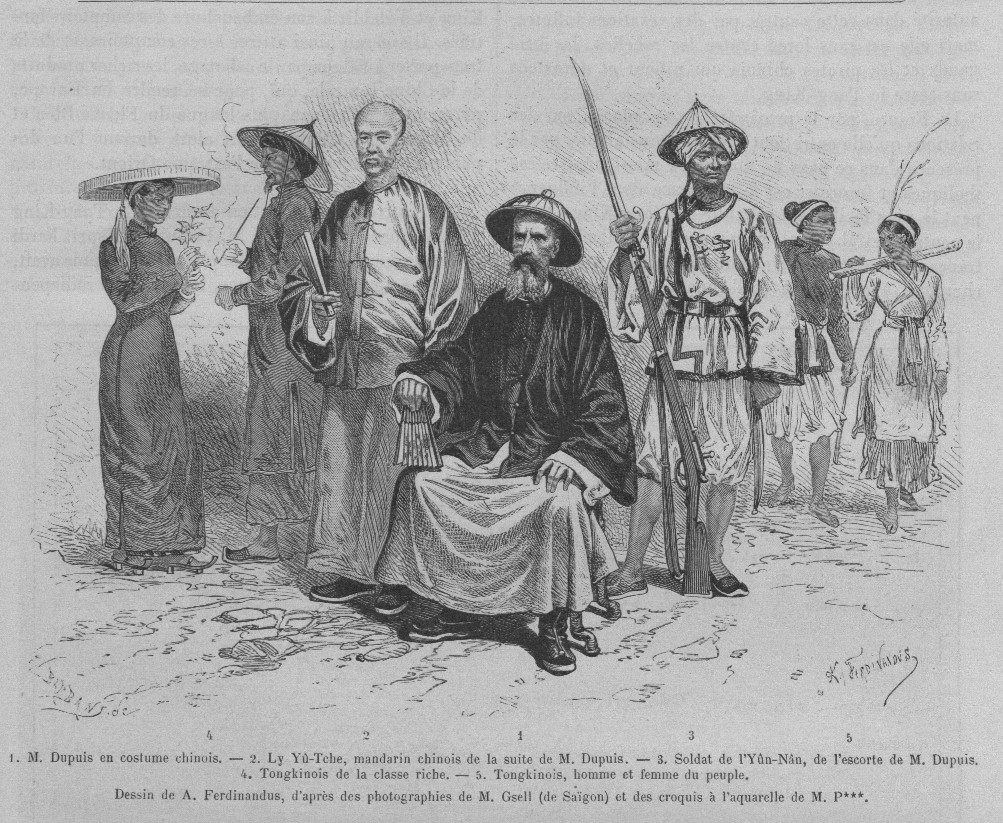
Jean Dupuis

Jean Dupuis (7 December 1829, Saint-Just-la-Pendue, France – 28 November 1912, Monaco) was a French trader and explorer. In Vietnamese royal records, he was referred as Đồ Phổ Nghĩa.

== Biography ==
Dupuis was educated at Tarare (Rhône department). In 1858 he went to Egypt as a trader, and from thence to China. His trading journeys took him into many previously unexplored parts of southern China, and in 1871–2 his efforts opened up the Red River to commerce. In 1873 he was involved in a dispute with the Vietnamese authorities for trading weapons for goods on the Red River.

He was one of those people who persuaded the French to try and establish a base in Vietnam. The French explorer Francis Garnier came down on the request of the governor of Cochin China to solve the dispute; Garnier invaded the Tonkin area and captured its capital, Hanoi. The foundations of the French possessions in Tongking were thereby laid and Dupuis did much to assist in the conquest of the country. Dupuis was in 1881 awarded the Delalande Guérineau prize by the Academy of Sciences in Paris.

== Works ==
His explorations are described in the following works:

- L'ouverture du fleuve Rouge au commerce (1879)
- Les origines de la question du Tong-kin (1896)
- Le Tong-kin et l'intervention française (1898)
- Le Tong-kin de 1872 à 1886 (1910)
