= Paul-Louis-Félix Philastre =

French scholar and colonial administrator in Indochina (1837–1902)

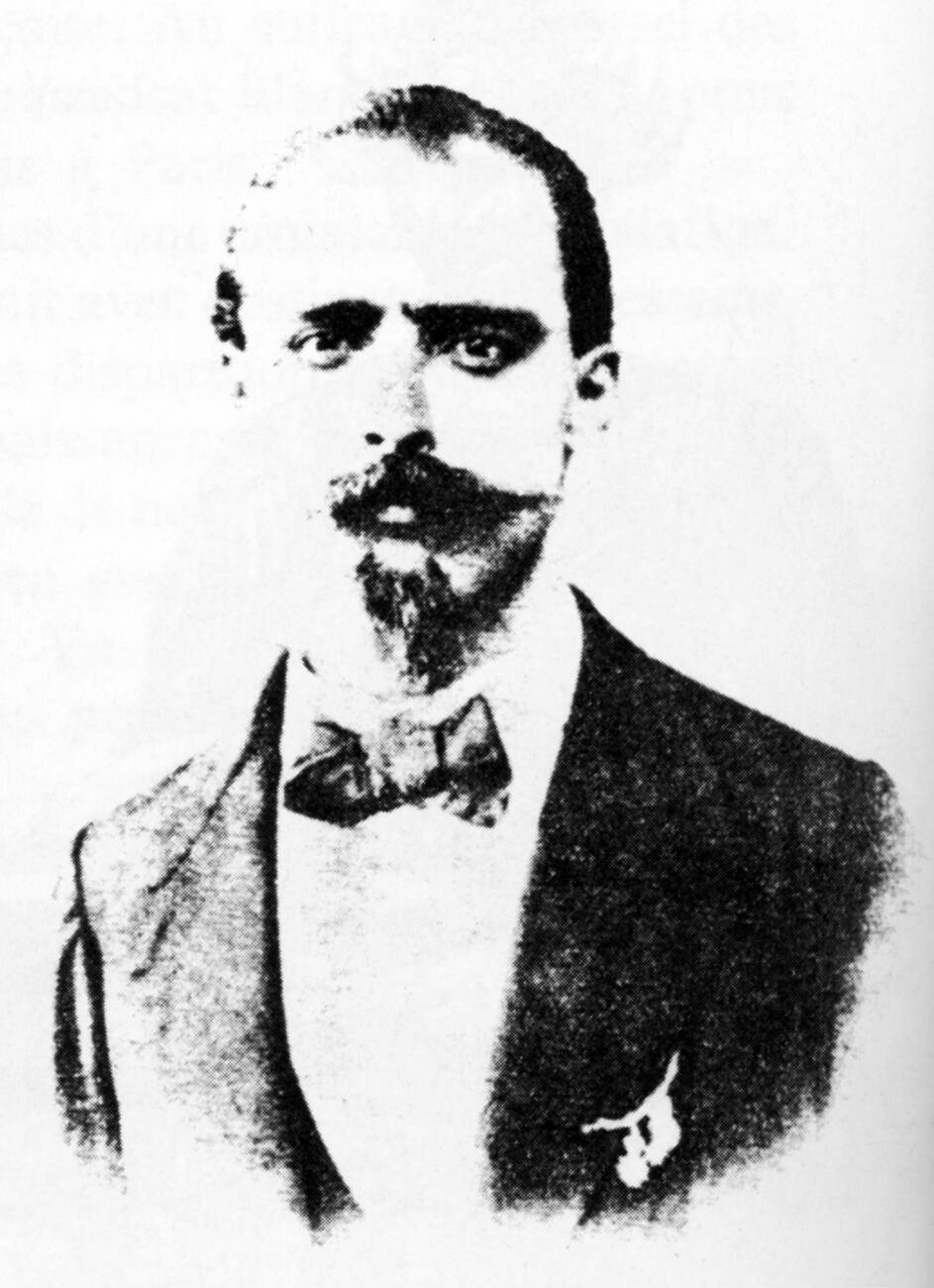

Paul-Louis-Félix Philastre (born 7 February 1837 in Brussels, died 11 September 1902, Buyat-Beayeau, France) was a French colonial administrator, diplomat and scholar. In Vietnamese royal records, he was referred as Hoắc Đạo Sinh (霍道生).

Philastre graduated from the French naval academy in 1857 and took service on the Avalanche, arriving in Cochinchina in 1861. In 1863, Philastre was appointed inspector of native affairs in a village in the Mekong river delta and two years later he obtained the position of director of native legal affairs. In 1868, he became ill and was forced to return to France. During the Franco-Prussian War and the Paris Commune, Philastre defended Paris in his capacity as commander of an artillery regiment.

In 1873, Philastre returned to the French colonial service in Indochina. Philastre played in important role in mediating between the French colonial authorities in Annam and the royal court in Huế. In 1874, Philastre negotiated the Second Treaty of Saigon with the Annamese court. He also served in Cambodia. He left Indochina in 1889.

Philastre authored a number of works on Chinese and Vietnamese studies, most important of which are the first French translation of the Yijing and a complete translation of the Emperor Gia Long's Code, which was based on the Qing Code.

== Works ==
- Le Yi king, ou, Livre des changements de la dynastie des Tsheou, traduit pour la première fois du chinois en français par P.-L.-F. Philastre. Paris: Ernest Leroux, 1885-1893.
- Le code annamite: nouvelle traduction complète. 2 vols, Études sur le droit annamite et chinois. Paris: E. Leroux, 1909.
