= Capture of Vĩnh Long =

- Part of the Cochinchina campaign
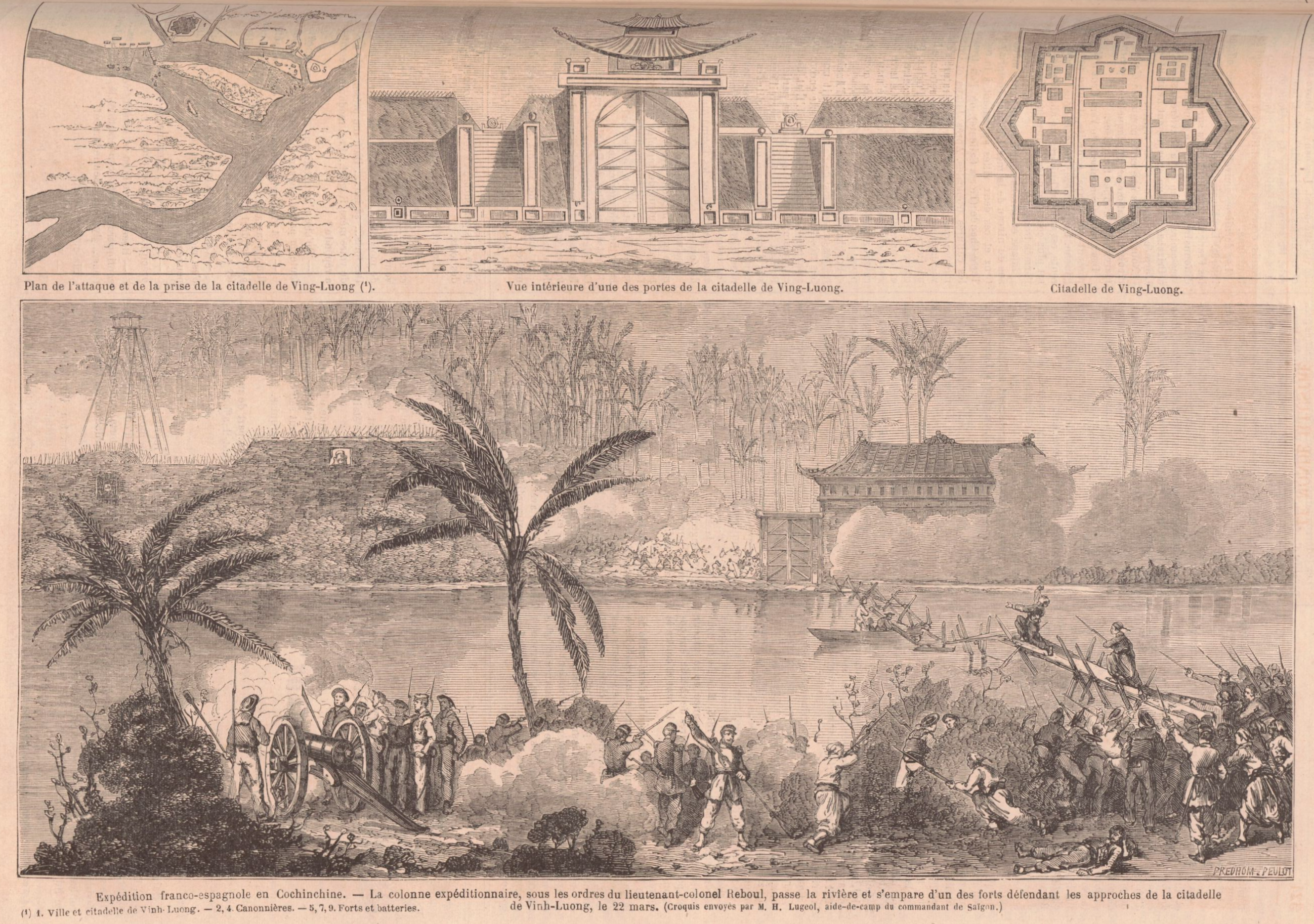
- Images from the capture of Vĩnh Long (Le Monde illustré, 1862)
Date	22 March 1862
Location	Vinh Long, Mekong Delta region in southern Vietnam
Result	French and Spanish victory

Belligerents
(Second French Empire) French Empire; (Spain) Spanish Empire; (Spain) Captaincy General of the Philippines	Nguyễn dynasty

Commanders and leaders
(Second French Empire) Louis-Adolphe Bonard (Second French Empire) Lieutenant-Colonel Reboul (Spain) Carlos Palanca Gutiérrez	

Strength
2 despatch vessels 9 gunboats 700 French infantry 300 Spanish infantry	

The Capture of Vĩnh Long (Vietnamese: Vĩnh Long) on 22 March 1862 was the last major allied victory of the Cochinchina campaign (1858–62). This campaign, fought between the French and the Spanish on the one side and the Vietnamese on the other, began as a limited punitive expedition and ended as a French war of conquest. The war concluded with the establishment of the French colony of Cochinchina, a development that inaugurated nearly a century of French colonial dominance in Vietnam.

== Background ==
The Vĩnh Long campaign was undertaken by the French and Spanish as a reprisal for Vietnamese guerrilla attacks in February and March 1862 on French troops and gunboats in the vicinity of Mỹ Tho. French marching columns were sniped at on the roads, and on 10 March a French gunboat (No. 25) carrying a company of soldiers blew up shortly after it left Mỹ Tho. Fifty-two men were killed or wounded in this incident, and a commission of enquiry found that the explosion was due to sabotage.

Convinced that the mandarins of the province of Vĩnh Long were behind these attacks, Admiral Louis-Adolphe Bonard, the French commander-in-chief, decided to capture the town of Vĩnh Long with a flotilla of despatch vessels and gunboats and a joint Franco-Spanish landing force. On 20 March 1862 he arrived before the fortress of Vĩnh Long with the dispatch vessels Ondine (his flagship) and Shamrock, the gunboats Dragonne and Fusée and seven small gunboats. The landing force, embarked aboard the gunboats, numbered 700 French soldiers and 300 Spanish soldiers, under the orders of Lieutenant-Colonel Reboul of the marine infantry. On 20 March these troops, reinforced by the ships’ landing companies, were set ashore at Dinh Kao, to the southeast of the citadel.

== The capture of Vĩnh Long ==
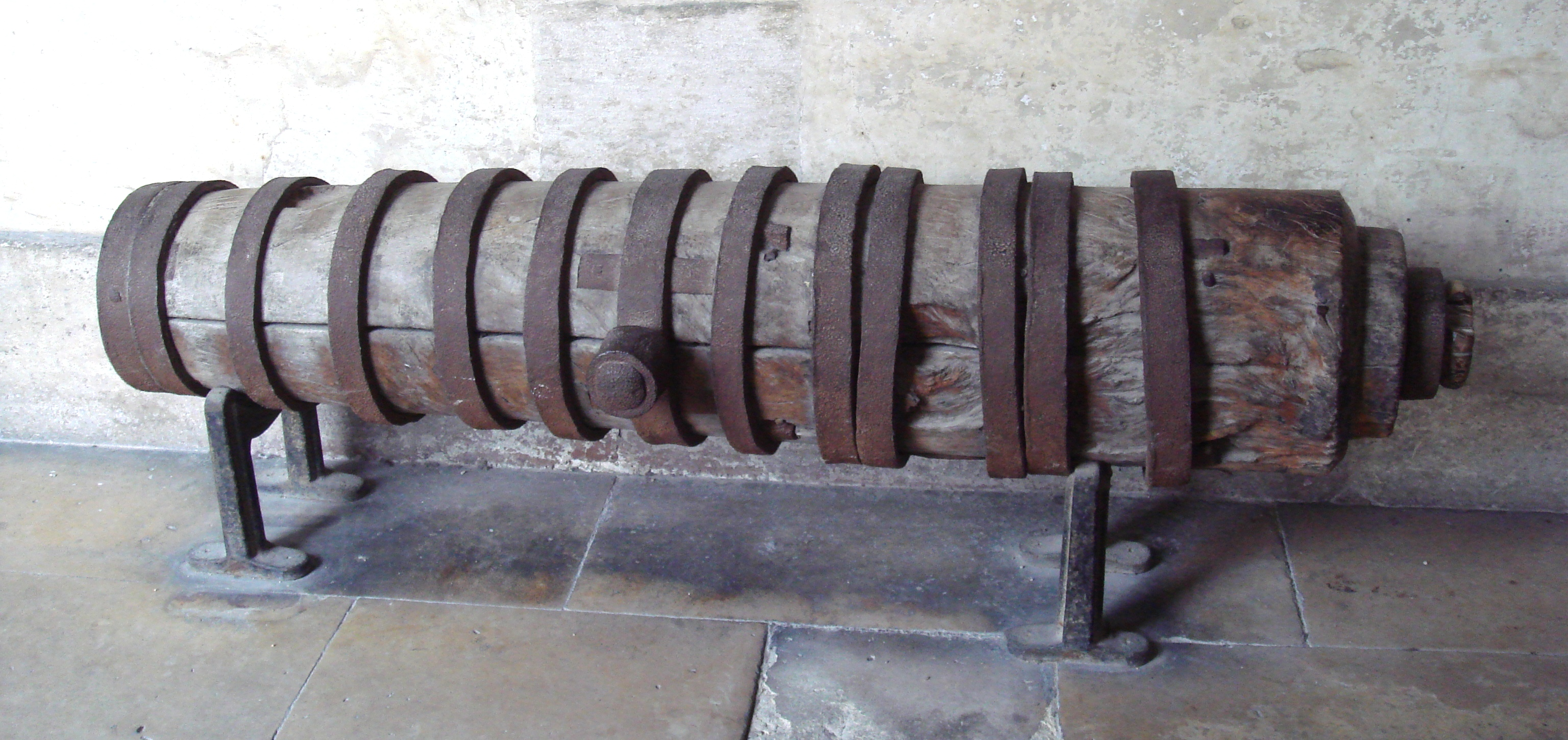
Vietnamese wooden cannon found by the French in the citadel of Vĩnh Long. Caliber: 97 mm. Length: 1.90 m. Musée de l'Armée, Paris

The following account of the attack by Reboul's French and Spanish troops on Vĩnh Long was given by Colonel Thomazi, the historian of the French conquest of Indochina:

On 22 March they crossed two arroyos under fire and advanced into view of the enemy batteries, which had been fighting a violent artillery duel with the gunboats. During the night, after a seven-hour struggle, all the batteries were occupied, and on the following day we entered the citadel, where we found 68 cannon and considerable quantities of materiel.

== Mopping-up operations ==
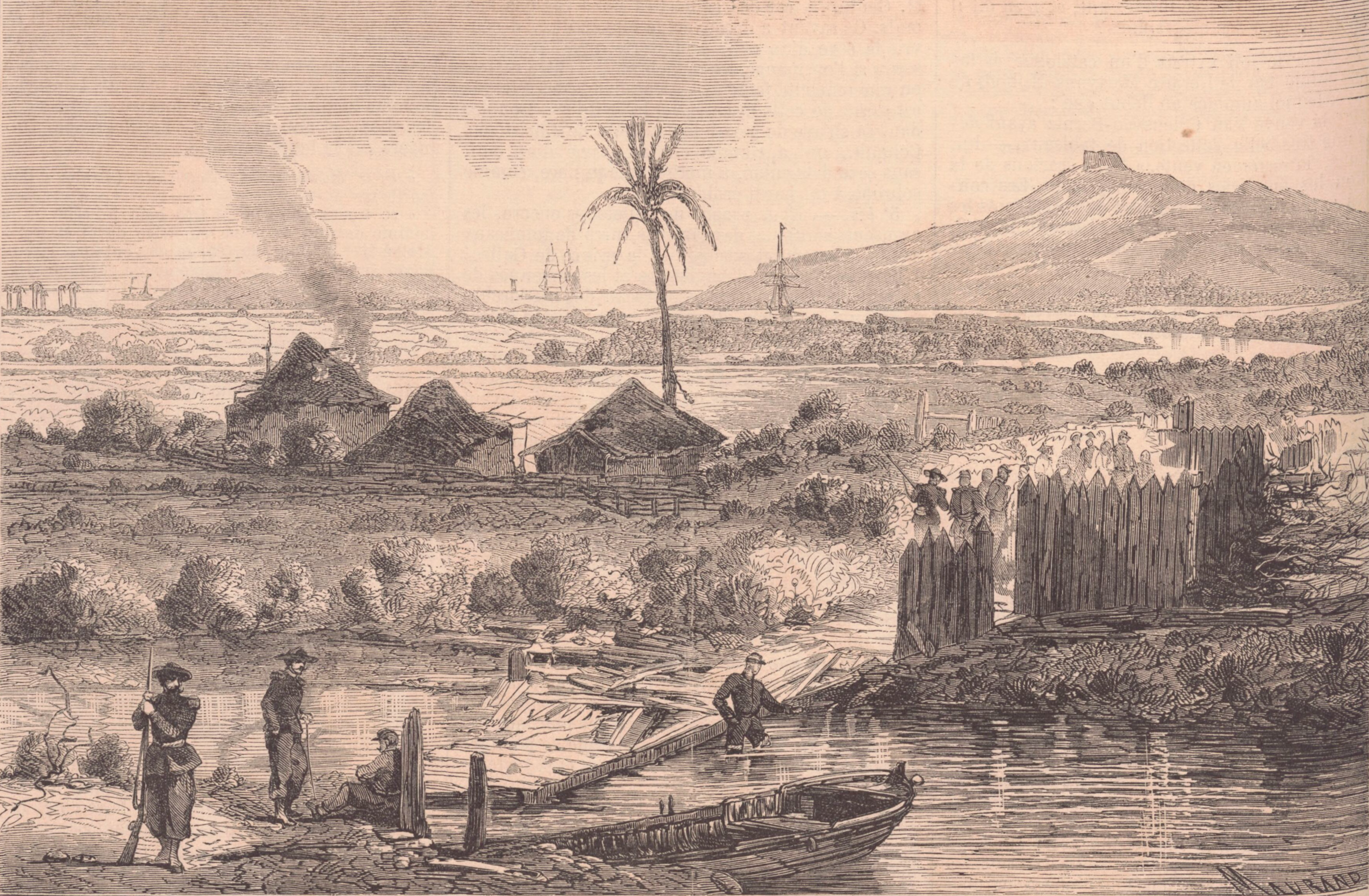
A French outpost on the Vinh-Luong River (Le Monde illustré, 1862)

The Vietnamese defenders of Vĩnh Long fell back to a fortified earthwork at My Cui, 20 kilometres (12 mi) west of Mỹ Tho. Admiral Bonard sent two columns under the respective command of capitaine de vaisseau Desvaux and Colonel Carlos Palanca Gutiérrez to capture My Cui. Desvaux's column, which consisted of two companies of Turcos and a detachment drawn from the garrison of Vĩnh Long, set off from Vĩnh Long and approached My Cui via Cai Lay.

Palanca Gutiérrez's column, which consisted of 200 Spanish troops, a company of Turcos and a section of artillery, marched directly on My Cui from Vĩnh Long. The two columns attacked My Cui simultaneously and captured it. Lieutenant de vaisseau Vergnes, who was watching the arroyos around Mỹ Tho with a detachment of fusiliers-marins, intercepted and inflicted a further defeat on the retreating Vietnamese. Vietnamese casualties were heavy, and the allies also captured a large number of weapons.

== Aftermath ==
Coming on the heels of earlier allied victories at Mỹ Tho (April 1861) and Biên Hòa (December 1861), the capture of Vĩnh Long disheartened the Court of Hue, and in April 1862 Tự Đức let it be known that he was willing to make peace.
