= Cochinchina campaign =

1858–1862 Franco-Spanish military expedition against Vietnam

- Part of the French conquest of Vietnam and Western imperialism in Asia
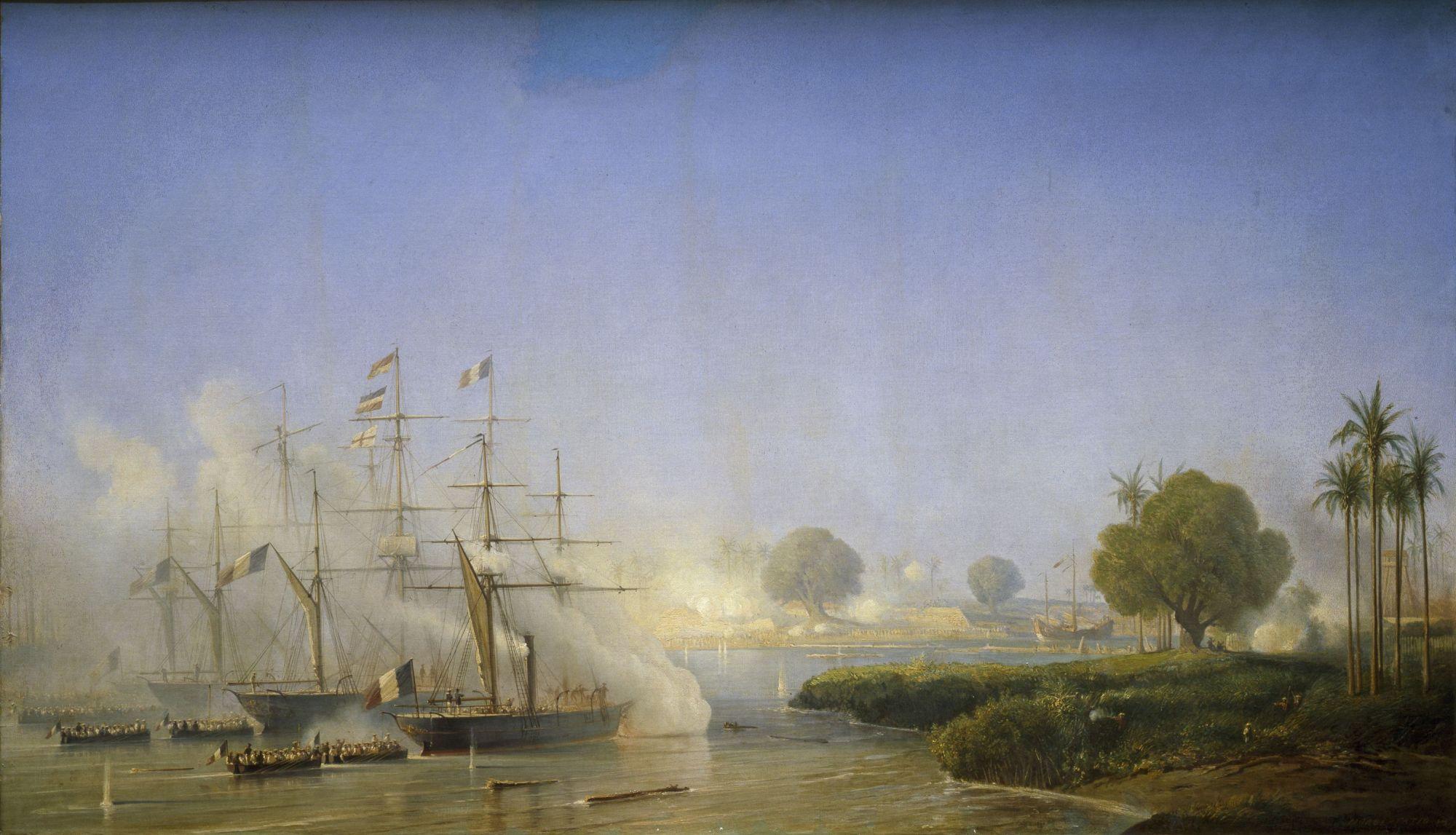
- Capture of Saigon, 18 February 1859; Antoine Léon Morel-Fatio, 1867
Date	1 September 1858 – 5 June 1862 (3 years, 9 months and 4 days)
Location	Nam Kỳ, Đại Nam
Result	Franco-Spanish victory: Treaty of Saigon
Territorial changes	Cochinchina becomes a French colony

Belligerents
France; Spain: Spanish East Indies; Cobelligerent: United States (Bombardment of Qui Nhơn only)	Đại Nam

Commanders and leaders
Charles Rigault de Genouilly; François Page; Léonard Charner; Louis Bonard (Second French Empire) Élie de Vassoigne (Spain) Carlos Palanca (United States) James F. Schenck (United States) Frederick K. Engle	Emperor Tự Đức; Nguyễn Tri Phương (WIA); Phạm Thế Hiển †; Lê Đình Lý †; Đào Trí

Strength
~3,000; 1 frigate 2 corvettes 2 avisos 9 gunboats	10,000+

Casualties and losses
Light	Heavy

The Cochinchina campaign was a series of military operations between 1858 and 1862, launched by a joint naval expedition force on behalf of the French Empire and the Kingdom of Spain against the Nguyễn period Vietnamese state. It was the opening conflict of the French conquest of Vietnam.

Initially a limited punitive expedition against the execution of two Spanish Catholic missionaries in Đại Nam, the ambitious French emperor Napoleon III however, authorized the deployment of increasingly larger contingents, that subdued Đại Nam territory and established French economic and military dominance. The war concluded with the founding of the French colony of Cochinchina and inaugurated nearly a century of French colonial rule in Vietnam in particular and Indochina in general.

== Background ==
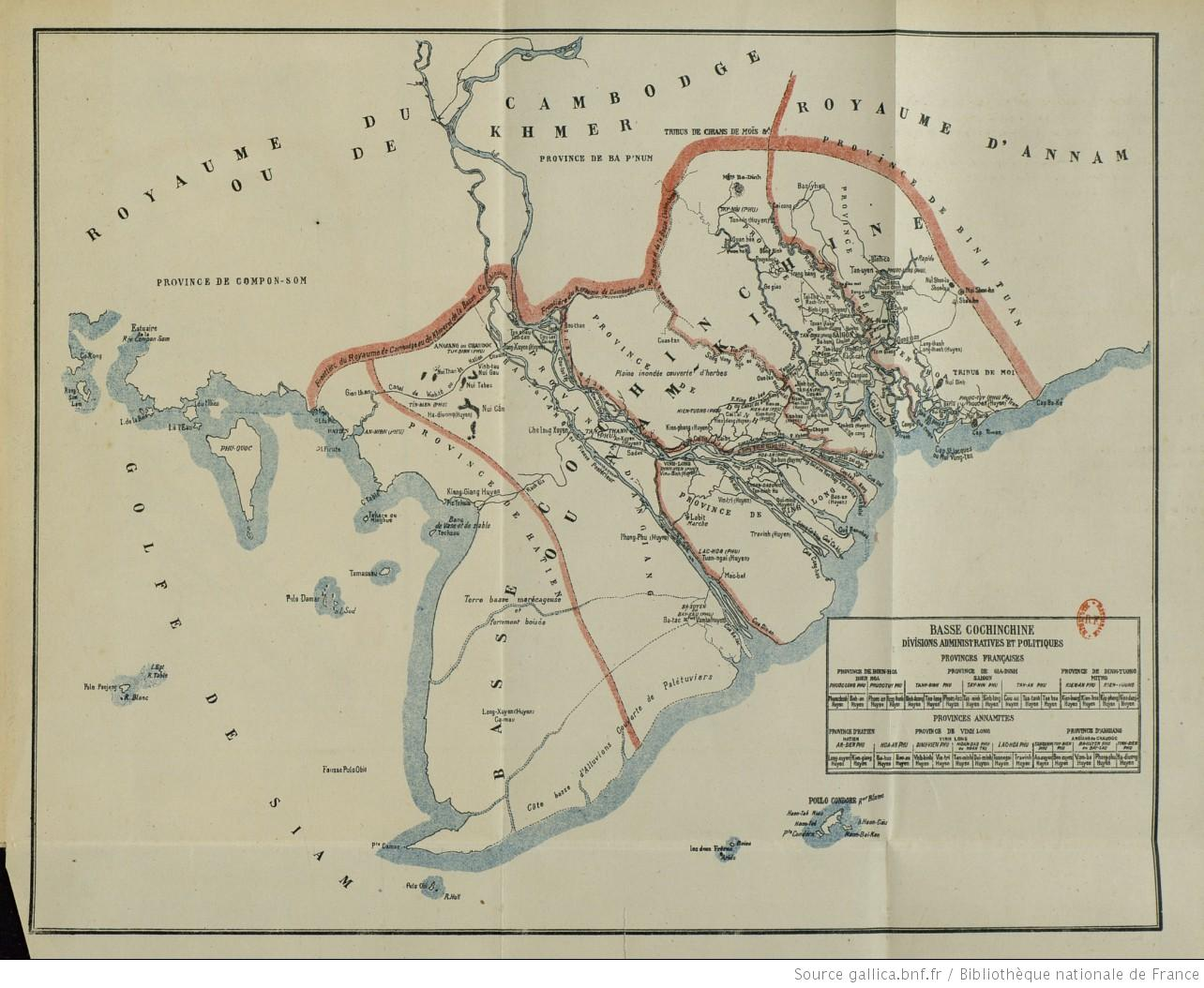
Map of Cochinchina

During the mid-nineteenth century, European powers quickly overran and annexed large portions of the world to their colonial empires. France was one such nation, and sought opportunities to expand its influence in Asia, Africa and Latin America. Vietnam was an uncolonised and independent nation which became the main focus of French geopolitical and imperialist aspirations that were part of the broader trend of Western imperialism in Asia. Certain elements of the French establishment argued that the Vietnamese emperor Gia Long owed France greater goodwill for the assistance that the Kingdom of France had provided him with in his struggle against his Tây Sơn dynasty opponents. However, Gia Long felt neither bound to France nor to the Qing Empire, which had also provided help. Gia Long contended that the French government had failed to honor the Treaty of Versailles (1787) and assisted him in the civil war since those who had helped him were volunteers such as Pierre Pigneau de Behaine, or adventurers, not officials.

Advanced fortification methods and technologies had already been adopted and implemented as trained Vietnamese planners had successfully reproduced the elaborate 18th century Vaubanesque citadel of Saigon built by French engineers.

French missionaries had been active in Vietnam since the 17th century. Although the ultimate goal of a Catholic Vietnamese emperor had yet to be achieved, by the middle of the 19th century a community of 600,000 Roman Catholic converts existed in Annam and Tonkin according to Bishop Pellerin. However, most of the bishops and priests were either French or Spanish and many Vietnamese disliked and suspected this sizable Christian congregation and its foreign leaders. The French clerics increasingly felt responsible for the communal safety as tension built up gradually. During the 1840s, persecution or harassment of Catholic missionaries in Vietnam by the Vietnamese emperors Minh Mạng and Thiệu Trị evoked only sporadic and unofficial French response and decisive steps towards military incursions and an eventual establishment of a French colonial empire in Indochina was not taken until 1858.

In 1857, the Vietnamese emperor Tự Đức approved the execution of two Spanish Catholic missionaries. This was neither the first nor the last such incident and on previous occasions the French government had overlooked such provocations. But this event coincided with France dispatching a military expedition to China during the outbreak of the Second Opium War. France used these forces to subsequently intervene in Indochina. In November 1857, Napoleon III, emphasizing the rationale of Mission Civilisatrice, authorised Admiral Charles Rigault de Genouilly to lead a punitive expedition against Vietnam. In September 1858, a joint French and Spanish naval expedition force landed at Tourane (Da Nang) and captured the town.

== Tourane and Saigon ==
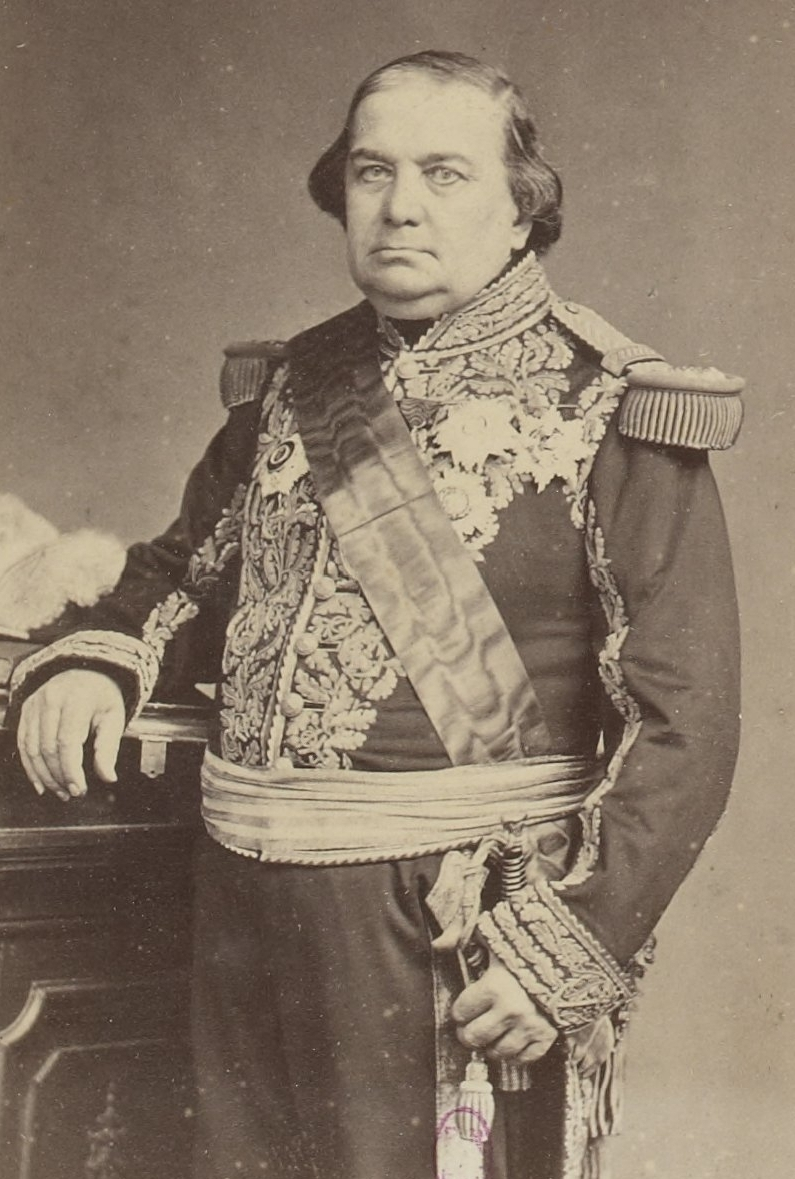
Admiral Charles Rigault de Genouilly (1807–1873)

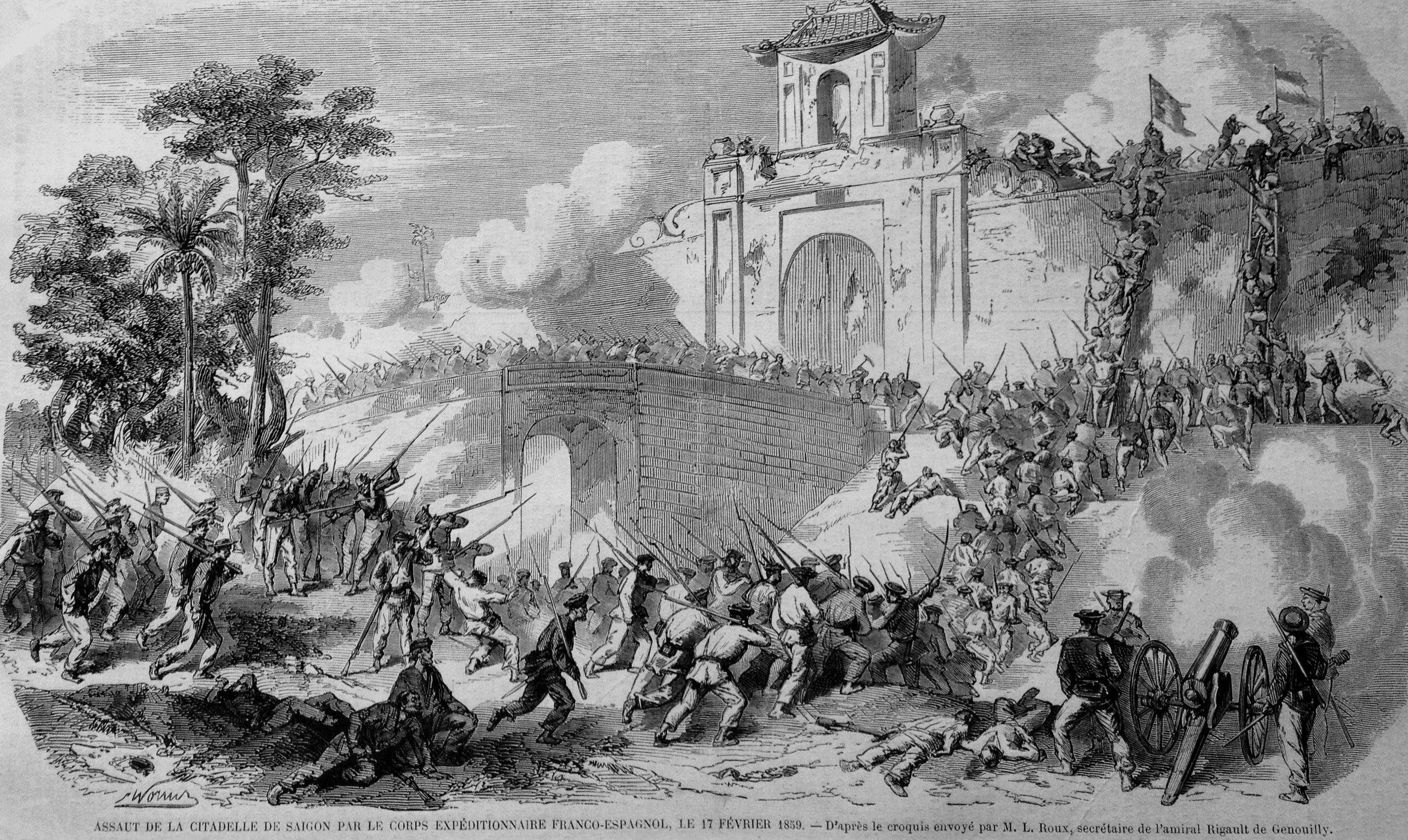
French capture of Saigon, 17 February 1859

=== Events at Tourane ===
The Franco-Spanish force anticipated an easy victory, but the campaign did not go as planned. The Vietnamese Christian community did not rise in support of France, as Bishop Pellerin had confidently predicted they would, and a well organized Vietnamese military resistance was more formidable than expected. The French and Spanish, who had captured the city in a marine assault found themselves in no position to progress further inland and were pinned down in a long siege by a Vietnamese army under the command of Nguyễn Tri Phương. Allied reinforcements only replaced losses leaving a small force, that occasionally attacked sections of the Vietnamese positions, but were unable to break the siege. The Siege of Tourane lasted for nearly three years and despite relative little combat, casualties among the Franco-Spanish troops were high, as diseases took a heavy toll.

Realising that the French garrison at Tourane was not to achieve a strategic success shortly, Charles Rigault de Genouilly pondered options of operations in either Tonkin or Cochinchina in October 1858. As an expedition to Tonkin would require a rather unlikely large-scale uprising by the Vietnamese Christians to have any chance of success, in January 1859 he proposed to the Ministère de la Marine an expedition against Saigon in Cochinchina. This city was of considerable strategic significance as a source of food for the Vietnamese army.

=== Attack on Saigon ===
The expedition was approved, and in early February Rigault de Genouilly sailed south for Saigon, leaving command of Tourane to capitaine de vaisseau (captain of the ship) Thoyon with a small French garrison and two gunboats. On 17 February 1859, after breaking the river defences and destroying a series of forts and stockades along the Saigon river, the French and Spanish captured Saigon. French marine infantry stormed the enormous Citadel of Saigon, while Filipino troops under Spanish command repelled a Vietnamese counterattack. The allies lacked the manpower to hold the citadel and on 8 March 1859 demolished it and set fire to the rice granaries. In April, Rigault de Genouilly returned to Tourane with the bulk of his forces to reinforce Thoyon's hard-pressed garrison, leaving capitaine de frégate Bernard Jauréguiberry with a Franco-Spanish garrison of around 1,000 men at Saigon.

The Franco-Spanish division struggled to consolidate its position after the capture of Saigon. Jauréguiberry's small detachment suffered substantial losses in a surprise attack on a Vietnamese fortification to the west of Saigon on 21 April 1859 and was forced to remain inside its defence perimeter thereafter. Meanwhile, the outbreak of the Austro-Sardinian War tied down large numbers of French troops in Italy. In November 1859, Rigault de Genouilly was replaced by Admiral François Page, who had been instructed to obtain a treaty with focus on the protection of the Catholic faith in Vietnam and not to seek any territorial gains. In early November Page began negotiations, which, however, proved to be unsatisfactory.

The Vietnamese, aware of France's distraction in Italy, refused these moderate terms and spun out the negotiations in the hope that the allies would cut their losses and abandon the campaign altogether. On 18 November 1859 Page bombarded and captured the Kien Chan forts at Tourane, but this allied tactical victory failed to change the stance of the Vietnamese negotiators. The war continued into 1860.

=== The siege ===
During the second half of 1859 and throughout 1860, the French had failed to bring about a decisive breakout or made any territorial gains at Tourane and Saigon. Although the Austro-Sardinian War ended by early 1860 the French were again at war with China and Page had to divert most of his forces to support Admiral Léonard Charner's China expedition. In April 1860, Page left Cochinchina to join Charner at Canton. Meanwhile, in March 1860, a 4,000 strong Vietnamese army began to besiege Saigon. The defence of Saigon was entrusted to capitaine de vaisseau Jules d'Ariès. The 1,000 men strong Franco-Spanish garrison in Saigon had to resist a siege by superior numbers from March 1860 to February 1861. Realising that they could hold only either Saigon or Tourane, the French evacuated the garrison of Tourane in March 1860, bringing the Tourane campaign to an unsuccessful end.

== Ky Hoa and Mỹ Tho ==
In early 1861, the war with China ended as the admirals Charner and Page were now free to return to Cochinchina and resume the campaign around Saigon. A naval contingent of 70 ships under Charner (who was now in charge of all land and sea forces) and 3,500 soldiers under the command of General de Vassoigne were transferred from northern China to Saigon. Charner's squadron was the most powerful French naval force in Vietnamese waters prior to the creation of the French Far East Squadron on the eve of the Sino-French War (August 1884 to April 1885). It included the steam frigates Impératrice Eugénie and Renommée (Charner and Page's respective flagships), the corvettes Primauguet, Laplace and Du Chayla, eleven screw-driven despatch vessels, five first-class gunboats, seventeen transports and a hospital ship. The squadron was accompanied by half a dozen armed lorchas purchased in Macao.

These reinforcements eventually provided the allies with troops for tactical maneuvers at Saigon. On 24 and 25 February 1861, the French and Spanish successfully assaulted the Vietnamese siege lines, defeating marshal Nguyễn Tri Phương in the battle of Ky Hoa. Nonetheless, the Vietnamese forces vehemently and skillfully defended their positions, which resulted in considerable allied casualties. The victory at Ky Hoa allowed the French and Spanish to regain the operational initiative. In April 1861, the city of Mỹ Tho southwest of Saigon fell to the French. An assault force under capitaine de vaisseau Antoine Louis Le Couriault du Quilio, supported by a small flotilla of gunboats, advanced on Mỹ Tho from the north along the Bao Dinh Ha creek, and between 1 and 11 April destroyed several Vietnamese forts and fought its way along the creek to the vicinity of Mỹ Tho. Le Couriault de Quilio gave orders for an assault on the town on 12 April. However, a flotilla of warships under the command of Admiral Page, sent by Charner to approach up the Mekong river to attack Mỹ Tho by sea, appeared off the town on the same day. Mỹ Tho was occupied by the French on 12 April 1861 without a shot being fired.

In March 1861, shortly before the capture of Mỹ Tho, the French again offered peace terms to Tự Đức, which were considerably harsher than those offered by Page in November 1859. The French demanded the free exercise of Christianity in Vietnam, the cession of Saigon province, an indemnity of 4 million piastres, freedom of commerce and movement inside Vietnam and the establishment of French consulates. Tự Đức was only prepared to concede on the free exercise of religion and rejected all others. The war continued and after the fall of Mỹ Tho the French added Mỹ Tho province to the list of territorial demands.

Increasingly less able to confront the French and Spanish forces in open combat, Tự Đức was forced to shift to guerrilla warfare and sent his agents into the conquered Vietnamese provinces to organise resistance. Charner responded on 19 May by officially declaring a state of siege in the Saigon and Mỹ Tho provinces. French units roved through the Cochinchinese countryside, fanning popular resistance by the brutality with which they treated suspected insurgents. Although Charner had ordered his forces to restrain from violence against peaceful villagers, his orders were not always obeyed. Occasionally the Vietnamese guerrillas threatened the French troops as on 22 June 1861 the outpost at Gò Công was, although unsuccessfully, attacked by 600 Vietnamese insurgents.

== The Qui Nhơn incident ==
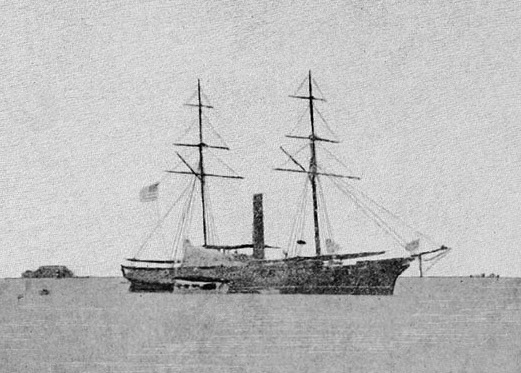
USS Saginaw at Mare Island naval yard

On 31 July 1861 the Vietnamese fort protecting Qui Nhơn city was destroyed by the USS Saginaw, a warship of the United States Navy. Under the command of Captain James F. Schenck a task force had been dispatched to Cochinchina in search of missing American citizens and sailors of the merchant ship Myrtle.

The ship encountered cannon fire from the fort's garrison upon entering and anchoring at Qui Nhơn harbour. The Saginaw flew a white flag of neutrality, signalling no hostile intentions, but the fire continued. Eventually Schenck gave orders to withdraw to a secure position and responded with an hour long bombardment. Fire from the fort ceased after forty minutes and its walls collapsed shortly after. US forces reported no damage or casualties. As communication with the Vietnamese fort's garrison could at no time be established and the missing American sailors could not be found, the USS Saginaw retreated towards Hong Kong on the same day.

== Biên Hòa and Vĩnh Long ==
The Capture of Mỹ Tho was the last military operation under Léonard Charner as commander of the Cochinchina expedition. He returned to France in the summer of 1861 and was replaced by Admiral Louis Adolphe Bonard, who arrived in Saigon at the end of November 1861. A mere fortnight later Bonard mounted a major campaign to overrun Đồng Nai Province in reprisal for the loss of the French lorcha Espérance and all her crew in an ambush. The provincial capital Biên Hòa was captured on 16 December 1861.

Admiral Bonard's forces proceeded by capturing Vĩnh Long on 22 March 1862 in a brief punitive operation of Vietnamese guerrilla attacks on French troops around Mỹ Tho. On 10 March 1862 a French gunboat leaving Mỹ Tho with a company of infantry aboard suddenly exploded. Casualties were heavy (52 men killed or wounded) and the French suspected Vietnamese sabotage by insurgents directed by the governors of Vĩnh Long Province.

Ten days later, Bonard anchored off Vĩnh Long with a flotilla of gunboats and eleven transport vessels and disembarked a Franco-Spanish landing force of 1,000 troops. In the afternoon and evening of 22 March, the French and Spanish assaulted the Vietnamese batteries entrenched before Vĩnh Long and captured them. On 23 March they entered the citadel of Vĩnh Long. Its defenders retreated to a fortified earthwork at My Cui 20 km (12 mi) to the west of Mỹ Tho, but were soon overrun and forced to flee. Vietnamese casualties at Vĩnh Long and My Cui were heavy.

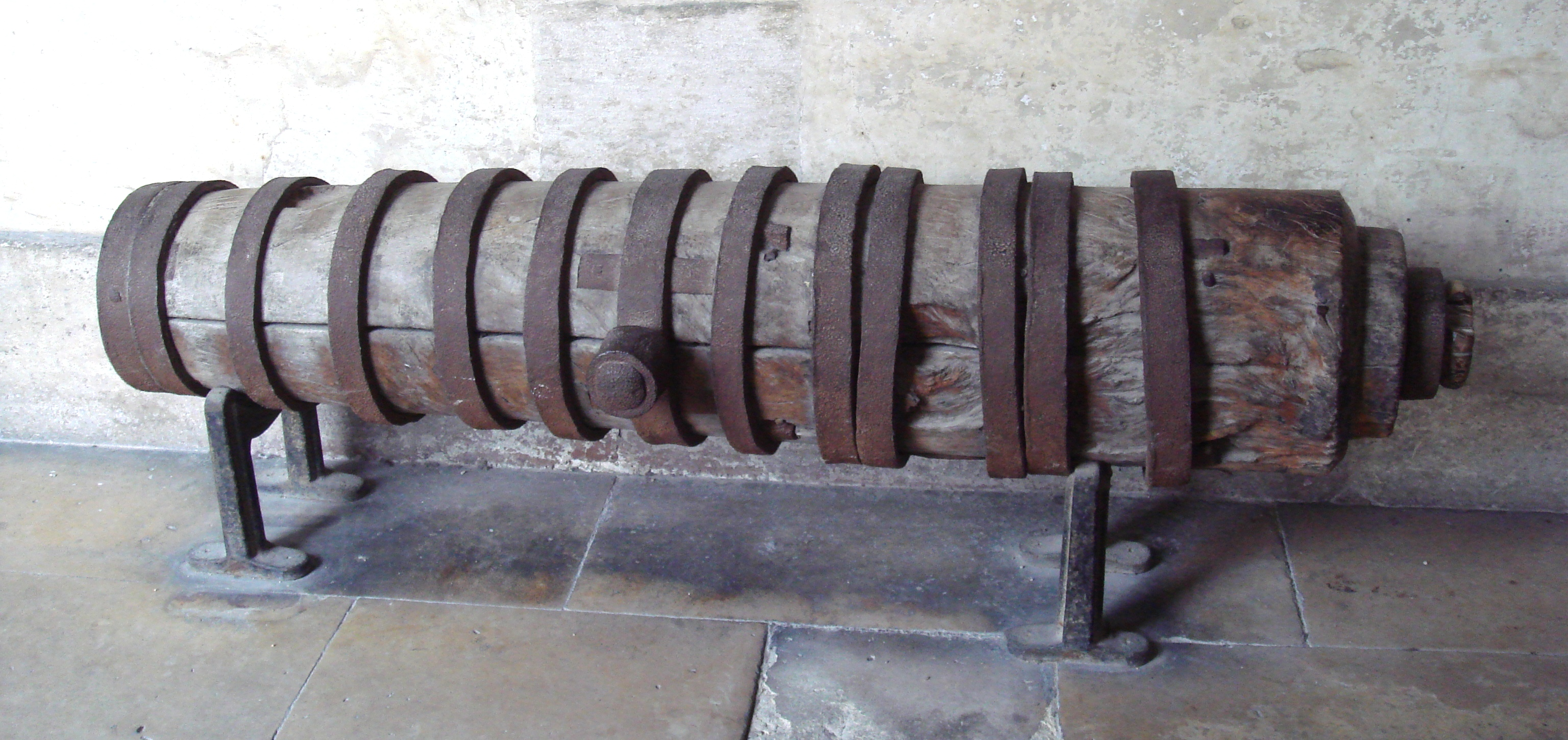
Vietnamese wooden cannon captured at Vĩnh Long by the French, 23 March 1862. Musée de l'Armée, Paris.

The loss of Mỹ Tho and Biên Hòa and the fall of Vĩnh Long seriously worsened the strategic situation for the Court at Huế and in April 1862 Tự Đức announced that he wished to make peace. In May 1862, following preliminary discussions at Huế, the French corvette Forbin anchored off Tourane where a Vietnamese delegation was to arrive in order to conclude peace. The Vietnamese were given three days to produce their ambassadors. The sequel was described by Colonel Thomazi, the historian of the French conquest of Indochina:

On the third day, an old paddlewheel corvette, the Aigle des Mers, was seen slowly leaving the Tourane River. Her beflagged keel was in a state of dilapidation that excited the laughter of our sailors. It was obvious that she had not gone to sea for many years. Her cannons were rusty, her crew in rags, and she was towed by forty oared junks and escorted by a crowd of light barges. She carried the plenipotentiaries of Tự Đức. Forbin took her under tow and brought her to Saigon, where the negotiations were briskly concluded. On 5 June a treaty was signed aboard the vessel Duperré, moored before Saigon.

== Peace ==
The expedition had turned out to be longer and costlier than initially thought and from a position of strength the French intended to fully enforce their conditions of military and colonial dominance. Tự Đức's minister Phan Thanh Giản signed a treaty with Admiral Bonard and the Spanish representative Colonel Carlos Palanca Gutiérrez on 5 June 1862. The Treaty of Saigon required Vietnam to legalize the free practise of the Catholic faith within its territory, to cede the provinces of Biên Hòa, Gia Định and Định Tường and the islands of Poulo Condore to France, to allow the French to trade and travel freely along the Mekong River, to open the ports of Tourane, Quảng Yên and Ba Lac (at the mouth of the Red River) to trade and to pay an indemnity of one million dollars to France and Spain over a ten-year period. The French placed all acquired territories under the administration of the Marine Ministry, thereby establishing the colony of Cochinchina with its capital Saigon.

== Aftermath ==
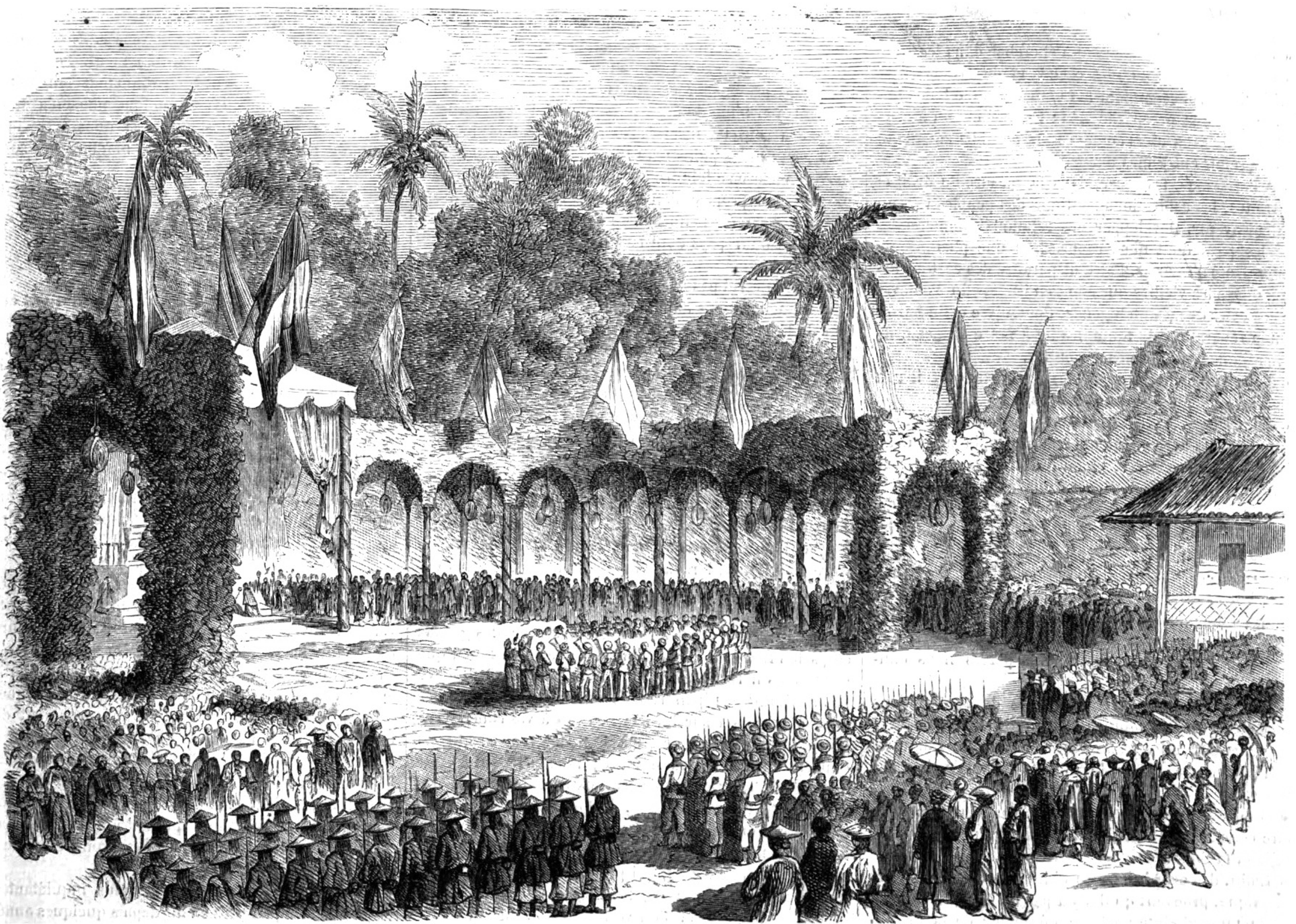
Celebration of the feast of the Queen of Spain in Saigon.

In 1864 the three southern provinces ceded to France were formally constituted as the French colony of Cochinchina. Within three years, France's new colony doubled in size. In 1867 Admiral Pierre de la Grandière forced the Vietnamese government to cede the provinces of Châu Đốc, Hà Tiên and Vĩnh Long to France. The Vietnamese emperor Tự Đức initially refused to accept the validity of this cession, but eventually recognized French dominion over the six provinces of Cochinchina in the 1874 Treaty of Saigon, negotiated by Paul-Louis-Félix Philastre after the military intervention of Francis Garnier in Tonkin.

The Spanish, who had played a junior role in the Cochinchina campaign, received a share of the indemnity but made no territorial acquisitions in Vietnam. Only a small force was kept in Saigon until it was withdrawn in 1863. The French encouraged the Spanish to seek a sphere of influence in Tonkin as an alternative, but nothing came of this suggestion, and Tonkin ultimately fell under French control and became a protectorate in 1883.

Perhaps the most important factor in Tự Đức's decision to make peace was the threat posed to his authority by a serious uprising in Tonkin led by the Catholic nobleman Le Bao Phung, who claimed descent from the old Lê dynasty. Although the French and Spanish rejected Le's offer of an alliance against Tự Đức, the insurgents in Tonkin were able to inflict several defeats on Vietnamese government forces. The end of the war with France and Spain allowed Tự Đức to overwhelm the insurgents in Tonkin and restore government control there. Le Bao Phung was eventually captured, tortured and put to death.

== See also ==
- Western imperialism in Asia

== Bibliography ==
- Bernard, H., Amiral Henri Rieunier, ministre de la marine – La vie extraordinaire d'un grand marin, 1833–1918 (Biarritz, 2005)
- Brecher, M., A Study of Crisis (University of Michigan, 1997)
- McAleavy, H., Black Flags in Vietnam: The Story of a Chinese Intervention (New York, 1968)
- Taboulet, G., La geste française en Indochine (Paris, 1956)
- Thomazi, A., Histoire militaire de l'Indochine français (Hanoi, 1931)
- Thomazi, A., La conquête de l'Indochine (Paris, 1934)
