= Pierre-Paul de La Grandière =

French admiral

Pierre-Paul Marie Benoît de La Grandière
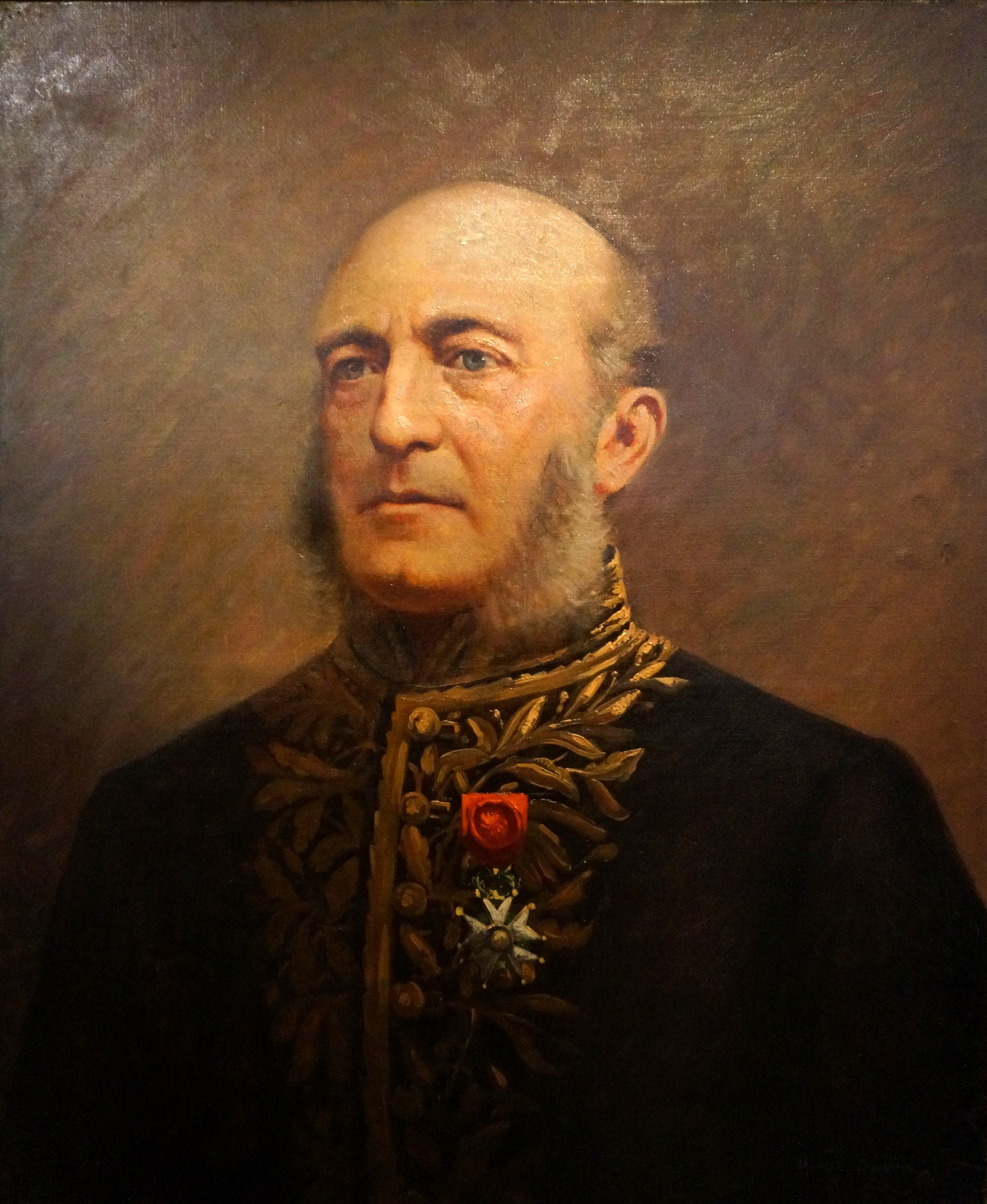
- Portrait by Mascré-Souville, Musée du Quai Branly, Paris

Governor of Cochinchina
- In office 16 October 1863 – 4 April 1868
- Monarch: Napoleon III
- Preceded by: Louis Adolphe Bonard
- Succeeded by: Marie Gustave Hector Ohier

Personal details
- Born: 28 June 1807 Redon, Ille-et-Vilaine, France
- Died: 25 August 1876 (aged 69) Quimper, Finistère, France
- Occupation: Admiral

Pierre Paul Marie Benoît de La Grandière (28 June 1807 – 25 August 1876) was a French admiral who was Governor of the colony of Cochinchina from 1863 to 1868. He consolidated French control over Vietnam as its colony, and developed the city of Saigon as a major port.

== Early years (1807–40) ==
The La Grandière family originated in Anjou and was involved in the navy from the 18th century. Pierre-Paul de La Grandière's grandfather, Charles Marie de La Grandière (1729–1812), fought in the American Revolutionary War, and during 64 years of service rose to the rank of Naval Commander in Brest. One of his uncles died on the Espérance while serving under Huon de Kermadec during the search for the lost expedition of Lapérouse. His father, Joseph Auguste Marie de La Grandière (1770–1845), emigrated in 1792 during the French Revolution, returned to the navy with the Bourbon Restoration and ended his career as a frigate captain in Lorient. His mother, Anne-Marie Chaillou de l'Étang (1780–1860), was from an old family of Breton magistrates.

La Grandière's parents married in Redon, Ille-et-Vilaine, in 1802. Pierre Paul Marie de La Grandière was their third child, born in Redon on 28 June 1807. In 1820 he entered the Angoulême naval school, and in May 1823 he embarked on the Circé on a voyage from Brest to Réunion, the West Indies, Newfoundland and then back to Brest. In 1827 he was a lieutenant on the Trident in the Battle of Navarino in which an Ottoman Empire fleet was defeated by an Anglo-French-Russian coalition fighting for the independence of Greece. In 1837 he served under Admiral Louis François Jean Leblanc^{(fr)} in the French blockade of the Río de la Plata and distinguished himself in the attack on Martín García Island and the blockade of Buenos Aires. He explored the Paraná and Uruguay rivers.

== Captain (1840–61) ==
In 1840 La Grandière was promoted to frigate captain (capitaine de frégate). He was made a member of the committee on artillery equipment. He held several commands in the Levant and then off Brazil. He was posted to the Indret Foundry^{(fr)} near Nantes in 1844. In 1846 he was aide-de-camp and chief of staff to Admiral Leblanc, who had been appointed Maritime Prefect of Brest. On 20 July 1847 he married Augustine Marc'hallac'h (1823–68). Their children were Augustin (1849–1918), Mélanie Mathilde (1857–1913) and Félix Palamède Pierre (1859–1923).

In 1849 La Grandière commanded the Méléagre off Newfoundland, and that year was promoted to ship captain (capitaine de vaisseau). La Grandière was given command of the corvette Eurydice during the Crimean War. It was rumored that La Grandière had shown cowardice on 31 August for not bringing the Eurydice to assist the Forte in engaging the Russian shore batteries. He violently refuted this aspersion. He participated in the Kamchatka expedition against Russia, where he distinguished himself although the operation was unsuccessful. He returned to France in 1856 and joined the Department of Maps and Plans in Paris and was then briefly in charge of the Mechanics Examination Committee.

In 1859 he took command of the Breslaw in the Adriatic Sea. The French under Napoleon III assisted the Italians led by Cavour's Kingdom of Sardinia in their war for unity against the Austrians. In October 1860 La Grandière was head of the Syrian Station.

== Admiral (1861–76) ==
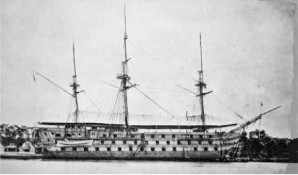
The French ship Duperré

French Indochina. Cochinchina is the southernmost province.

La Grandière was promoted to rear admiral in December 1861, and in 1862 was major general in Cherbourg and then in Brest.

Tự Đức, the Nguyễn emperor of Vietnam, ceded control of Saigon and the adjoining provinces of Biên Hòa, Gia Định and Định Tường to the French under the Treaty of Saigon of 5 June 1862, which they organized as the colony of Cochinchina. He also gave the French control of his trade and foreign relations and accepted French advisers, in effect becoming a French puppet. Admiral Louis Adolphe Bonard ensured that in the Treaty of Hué of 14 April 1863 Tự Đức confirmed the 1862 Treaty of Saigon under which Tonkin became a protectorate.

In May 1863 Prosper de Chasseloup-Laubat, Minister of Marine and Colonies, named La Grandière Governor General and commander of the Cochinchina naval station, with the Duperré as his flagship. (Note: The Duperré was an old boat that was used as a sort of hotel.) La Grandière proved to be a capable administrator and economist. He developed the port of Saigon with a 72 metres (236 ft) refit basin, a 92 metres (302 ft) floating dock and various other facilities to make the port a major site for reception and repair of ships. At first he prohibited the export of rice to ensure the supply of the local population and improve crops so they could again be exported. He developed French and indigenous administrations, created more schools, recruited and trained Indochinese troops and abolished corporal punishment. He supported Ernest Doudart de Lagrée and Francis Garnier in their Mekong expedition of 1866–1868.

In 1866 La Grandière initiated collection of artifacts from ancient Khmer and Chàm sites to be exhibited in Saigon, but they had to be stored until a suitable building could be made available. La Grandière made Achille-Antoine Hermitte head of his architectural department, as recommended by admirals Pierre-Gustave Roze and Gustave Ohier. His priority was to design a new Governor's Palace since the existing wooden building was in disrepair. La Grandière laid the cornerstone for this building on 23 March 1868, a block of blue granite from Biên Hòa containing a lead coffer that in turn contained newly-minted gold, silver and copper coins of Napoleon III. In 1868 La Grandière gave precise orders for collection and classification of dossiers, the origin of the French archives in Indochina. He recruited M. A. Petiton, a mining engineer from La Grand-Combe, Gard, as Chief Engineer of the Cochinchina Mines Service, with the mandate of undertaking geological and mining studies throughout Indochina. Petiton arrived in October 1868, after La Grandière had left Saigon.

On 11 August 1863 Admiral de La Grandière signed a Treaty of Friendship, Trade and French Protection with King Norodom of Cambodia. La Grandière visited Siem Reap and the ruins of Angkor Wat, then in Siamese territory, but he treated it as if it were part of Cambodia. La Grandière was promoted to vice admiral in September 1865. He supervised the 1866 French campaign against Korea by Rear Admiral Roze following the massacre of several French Catholics by the regent of the Kingdom of Korea. La Grandière was concerned that the Vietnamese provinces to the west of Cochinchina would be trouble spots, and secretly organized an expedition that occupied Vĩnh Long, Sa Đéc, Châu Đốc and Hà Tiên on 20–24 June 1867. Phan Thanh Giản, former envoy of Tu Duc in Paris and now governor of these provinces, told the mandarins to avoid bloodshed and submit. He then committed suicide. The French now controlled the whole of southern Vietnam. (Note: The three provinces La Grandière had occupied were formally incorporated into Cochinchina by the Second Treaty of Saigon in March 1874.)

La Grandière wrote,

I am attached to Cochinchina as to a child of which I took care during an illness and which gave me much concern... Yes, we shall maintain this glory, despite of and against our detractors. Yes, we will guide this colony, slowly perhaps, but with the assurance of its brilliant future. And we shall make ourselves loved and respected by our neighbours, by our Annamite subjects, and what is the most difficult of all, even by our French merchants.

La Grandière returned to France in April 1868. He was named Maritime Prefect of Toulon in 1870. He retired to Finistère and died in Quimper on 25 August 1876.

== Sources ==
- Cohen, Eldon Scott (October 1954), "French Archives in Indochina", The American Archivist, 17 (4), Silver Spring, Maryland: 313–316, doi:10.17723/aarc.17.4.m2tk720w10554241
- Corfield, Justin (2014-11-01), Historical Dictionary of Ho Chi Minh City, Anthem Press, ISBN 978-1-78308-333-6
- Corfield, Justin (2009-10-13), The History of Cambodia, ABC-CLIO, ISBN 978-0-313-35723-7
- Davies, Stephen (2014), "Achille-Antoine Hermitte (1840–70?)", Journal of the Royal Asiatic Society Hong Kong Branch, 54, Royal Asiatic Society Hong Kong Branch: 201–216, JSTOR jroyaaisasocihkb.54.201
- Doling, Tim (6 June 2014), Saigon's Earliest Museums
- Filippi, Jean-Michel (17 June 2013), "Angkor, before and beyond", Kampotmuseum
- Garric, Alain, Pierre Paul DE LA GRANDIÈRE Le Vice-Amiral (in French)
- Llewellyn, Jennifer; Southey, Jim; Thompson, Steve (2018), "The Conquest and Colonisation of Vietnam", Alpha History
- Mizerski, Jim (2016-01-01), Cambodia Captured: Angkor's First Photographers in 1860's Colonial Intrigues, Jasmine Image Machine, ISBN 9789924905004
- "P. de La Grandière. Un amiral clairvoyant", Le Télégramme (in French), 16 June 2013
- "Pierre Paul Marie de La GRANDIÈRE", École navale (in French)
- Petiton, Anatole (3 March 1883), La Cochinchine française : la vie à Saïgon, notes de voyage, Geographical Society of Lille on
- "Pierre-Paul de La Grandière, vice-amiral", netmarine.net (in French)
- Rath, Andrew (2015-08-18), The Crimean War in Imperial Context, 1854-1856, Palgrave Macmillan US, ISBN 978-1-137-54453-7
- The Conquest and Settlement of Cochinchina in "Les Colonies Francaises", Colonies Administration of the French Naval Ministry, 1889
