= Capture of Biên Hòa =

- Part of Cochinchina campaign
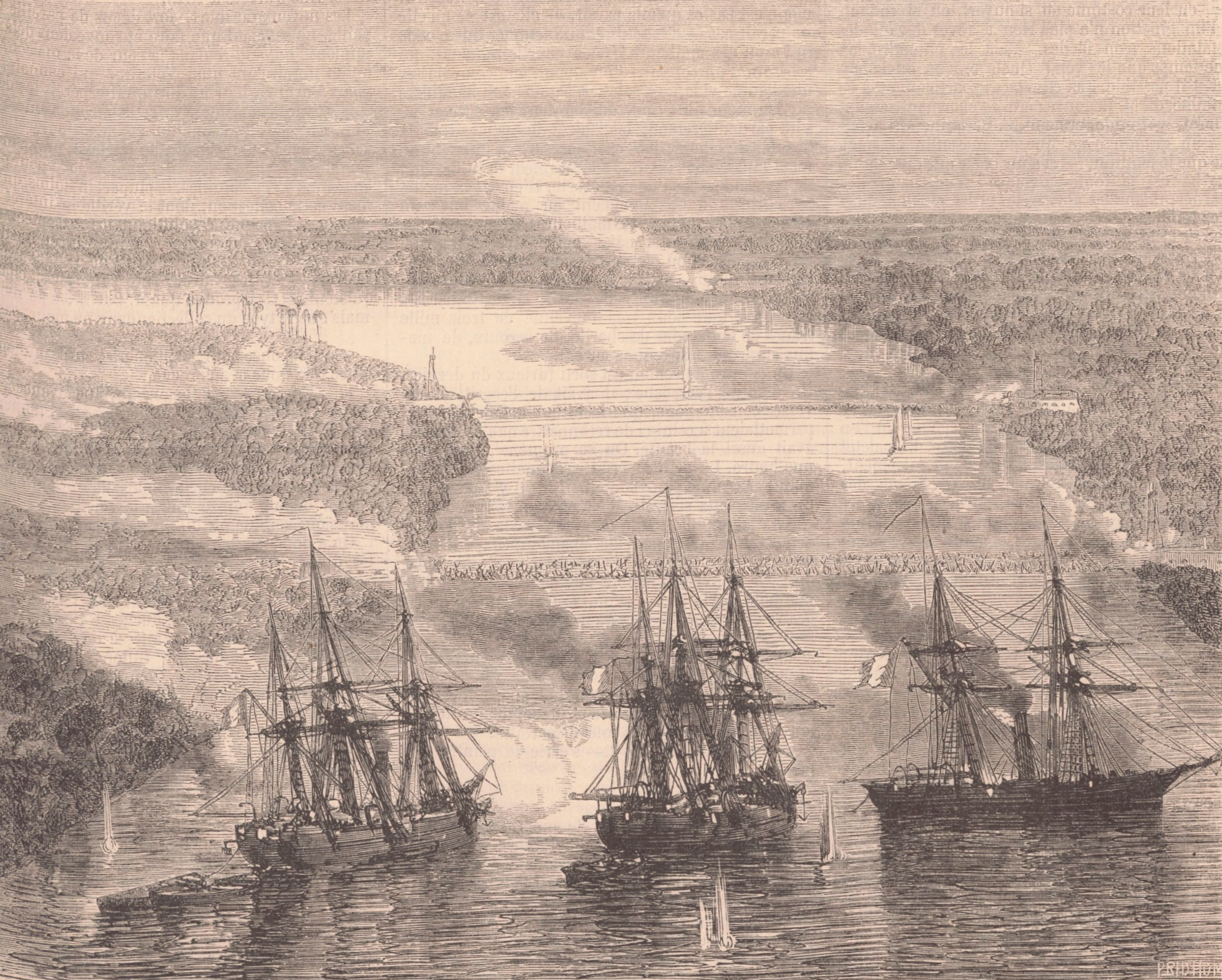
- Attack on the forts and dams of Biên Hòa by the French gunboats L'Avalanche, L'Alarme and Fusée (Le Monde illustré, 1862)
Date	16 December 1861
Location	Biên Hòa, (now in Đồng Nai Province) Vietnam
Result	Franco-Spanish victory

Belligerents
(Second French Empire) French Empire; (Spain) Spanish Empire; (Spain) Captaincy General of the Philippines	Nguyễn dynasty

Commanders and leaders
(Second French Empire) Louis-Adolphe Bonard (Spain) Diego Domenech	Nguyen Ba Nghi

Strength
To be supplied	Unknown

Casualties and losses
2 dead, several wounded	Unknown

The Capture of Biên Hòa (Vietnamese: Biên Hòa) on 16 December 1861 was an important allied victory in the Cochinchina campaign (1858–62). This campaign, fought between the French and the Spanish on the one side and the Vietnamese on the other, began as a limited punitive expedition and ended as a French war of conquest. The war concluded with the establishment of the French colony of Cochinchina, a development that inaugurated nearly a century of French colonial dominance in Vietnam.

== Background ==
After early French victories at Tourane and Saigon, the Cochinchina campaign reached a point of equilibrium with the French and their Spanish allies besieged in Saigon, which had been captured by a Franco-Spanish expedition under the command of Admiral Charles Rigault de Genouilly on 17 February 1859. The arrival of massive reinforcements from the French expeditionary corps in China in 1860 allowed the French to regain the initiative. On 24 and 25 February, 1861 Admiral Léonard Charner relieved the Siege of Saigon by defeating the besieging Vietnamese army in the battle of Ky Hoa. He followed up this victory with the Capture of Mỹ Tho (12 April 1861).

Charner had been sent out to the Far East for the war with China, and had not expected to be required to fight a campaign in Cochinchina as well. Believing that he had broken Vietnamese resistance with his victories at Ky Hoa and Mỹ Tho, he asked to return to France in the summer of 1861. Rear Admiral Louis Adolphe Bonard (1805–67), appointed as his successor by an imperial decree of 8 August 1861, arrived in Saigon on 27 November and assumed his duties on 30 November.

Bonard's arrival coincided with an upsurge in Vietnamese guerrilla activity against the French fomented by the government at Hue, which placed a bounty on the heads of both Frenchmen and Vietnamese in their service. Bands of insurgents attacked Tây Ninh and Tran Bang, and in one particularly galling incident the French lost one of their small warships. A band of Vietnamese mounted a hit-and-run attack on the French lorcha Espérance during the absence of her captain, enseigne de vaisseau Parfait, and lured the French vessel into an ambush. Her crew of 17 Frenchmen and Filipinos were overpowered and killed, and the insurgents burned the vessel. Bonard decided that an exemplary reprisal was required. A fortnight after his arrival in Saigon, after receiving an unsatisfactory response to an ultimatum he had sent to the Vietnamese governor Nguyen Ba Nghi, he mounted a major campaign to occupy the province of Biên Hòa.

== The capture ==
The following account of the capture of Biên Hòa was given by the French historian A. Thomazi:

"The Annamese had established defence works on all the routes leading to Biên Hòa. They had built an entrenched camp held by 3,000 men at My Hoa, midway between Biên Hòa and Saigon, and obstructed the course of the Donnai with nine solid barrages and a stockade. The admiral decided to attack simultaneously by land and water. He ordered the detached posts to remain on the defensive and to concentrate all disposable forces before Saigon. All being ready, and an ultimatum issued on 13 December going unanswered, the columns set off at daybreak on 14 December. The first column, commanded by chef de bataillon Comte and consisting of two companies of chasseurs à pied, 100 Spaniards and 50 horsemen with four mortars, made for Gò Công, which it captured at 7.30 a.m. A second column, consisting of 100 Spaniards and a battalion of marine infantry with two cannon, under the orders of Lieutenant-Colonel Domenech Diego, placed itself before the camp of My Hao. At the same time capitaine de vaisseau Lebris, with two companies of sailors, advanced on the Donnai, taking in reverse the batteries on the right bank. Finally, a flotilla of armed launches, having followed the creeks as far as Rach Gò Công, cannonnaded the works which were also bombarding the gunboats anchored in the Donnai under the orders of lieutenant de vaisseau Harel of Avalanche. The forts replied energetically, and the gunboat Alarme was hit by 54 balls and had her main mast nearly destroyed. But once the defenders saw themselves threatened by a land attack, they hastily evacuated the forts, one of which blew up and the others were occupied. The sailors toiled throughout the night to demolish the barrages, while the naval hydrographer Manen sounded the passes. The first obstacles having been destroyed, the two infantry columns joined hands in front of the camp of My Hoa on 15 December. The marine infantry attacked the enemy's centre, while the chasseurs menaced his right and the Spaniards his left, and the cavalry made a turning movement to cut off his retreat. The Annamese panicked and took to flight. Admiral Bonard, aboard the dispatch vessel Ondine, ascended the river and exchanged cannon shots with the citadel. On 16 December the troops crossed the Donnai and occupied Biên Hòa, which the Annamese soldiers had evacuated, but not before burning alive numerous Christian prisoners. We took there 48 cannons and 15 armed junks. The operation cost us only 2 men dead and several wounded."
