= Joseph Hyacinthe Louis Jules d'Ariès =

Acting Governor of Cochinchina
- In office 1 April 1860 – 6 February 1861
- Monarch: Napoleon III
- Preceded by: Théogène François Page
- Succeeded by: Léonard Charner

Personal details
- Born: 22 January 1813
- Died: 6 December 1878 (aged 65)
- Occupation: Naval officer

Joseph Hyacinthe Louis Jules d'Ariès (22 January 1813 – 6 December 1878) was a French naval officer who was Acting Governor of Cochinchina in 1860–61. He was in office throughout the Siege of Saigon, and held the city for 11 months against greatly superior Vietnamese forces.

== Life ==
=== Early years (1813–34) ===
Joseph Hyacinthe Louis Jules d'Ariès was born in Tarbes on 22 January 1813. His parents were Dominique Zacharie d'Ariès (1773–1819), a lawyer, prosecutor in Tarbes and then justice of the peace in Marciac, and Anne Jeanne Gratiane Henriette de Mérens (1786–1823). His brother, Adrien Paul Alfred d'Ariès (1819–90) became a divisional general. He graduated from the École Navale in 1829. He became a midshipman on 17 October 1829.

=== Naval officer (1834–60) ===
D'Ariès was promoted to enseigne de vaisseau (ensign) on 15 May 1834. On 6 March 1839 he was made a Knight of the Legion of Honour. In 1840 he was serving under the command of Emmanuel Graëb^{(fr)} on the 80-gun Généreux in the Mediterranean. D'Ariès was promoted to lieutenant de vaisseau (ship-of-the-line lieutenant) on that ship on 21 December 1840. On 1 January 1849 he was on the Marengo floating battery in Algiers, commanded by Pierre Victor Marcellin Sauvan. He was promoted to capitaine de frégate (commander) on 8 March 1854. He was made an Officer of the Legion of Honour on 22 April 1855. On 1 January 1857 he was based in Toulon. He was promoted to capitaine de vaisseau (ship-of-the-line captain) on 17 August 1859.

=== Cochinchina (1860–64) ===
D'Ariès became acting governor of Cochinchina on 1 April 1860 when Théogène François Page left Saigon for China. D'Ariès had only 1,000 men, while the Vietnamese commander Nguyễn Tri Phương had 10,000 fresh troops in Gia Định Province. During his term of office the Vietnamese frequently attacked the Saigon garrison during the Siege of Saigon, and d'Ariès put most of his energy into maintaining access to the sea. D'Ariès had 800 men under his command, including 200 Spanish, as well as two corvettes and four smaller sailing ships. He developed a series of rural fortifications to protect Saigon and Cholon, each with 80 howitzers and 30 rifles. He held office until 6 February 1861 when Admiral Léonard Charner took over command.

After the Anglo-French forces defeated the Chinese in the Battle of Palikao in October 1860 Charner was able to bring 70 warships of the Far East fleet to help d'Aries, with 3,500 French and Spanish troops led by General Élie de Vassoigne. Vassoigne's forces stormed Gia Định on 7 February 1861 and after two days of intense fighting in the Battle of Ky Hoa (24–25 February 1861) took Ky Hoa fortress, 6 kilometres (3.7 mi) from Saigon. At Ky Hoa the French found large stores of rice, 2,000 French rifles from Saint-Étienne and 500 heavy guns. Nguyen Tri Phuong retired to Biên Hòa and the French occupied Mỹ Tho. Emperor Tự Đức decided to negotiate a truce.

D'Ariès became a Commander of the Legion of Honour on 22 April 1861. Under the June 1862 Treaty of Saigon D'Ariès ceded the Vĩnh Long citadel in the Mekong Delta to Phan Thanh Giản. At the start of 1863 and 1864 he was deputy Chef de division in Cochinchina.

=== Later career (1869–78) ===
On 1 January 1869 d'Ariès was stationed in Toulon. He was promoted to contre-amiral (counter admiral) on 4 February 1872. In June 1872 he was a member of the Lighthouse Committee. In 1874 he was major of the 2nd maritime division in Brest. He entered the reserve on 22 January 1875. D'Ariès died on 6 December 1878 in Tillac, aged 65.

== Sources ==
- "ARIES D' : Joseph Hyacinthe Louis Jules", Base Léonore (in French), Archives nationales
- Chapuis, Oscar (2000), The Last Emperors of Vietnam: From Tu Duc to Bao Dai, Greenwood Publishing Group, ISBN 978-0-313-31170-3
- Corfield, Justin (2014-11-01), Historical Dictionary of Ho Chi Minh City, Anthem Press, ISBN 978-1-78308-333-6
- Garric, Alain, "Joseph Hyacinthe Louis Jules D'ARIÈS Le Contre-Amiral", Geneanet (in French)
- "Joseph Hyacinthe Louis Jules D'ARIÈS", École Navale (in French)
- "The Conquest and Settlement of Cochinchina", Les Colonies Francaises, Ministry of Marine, 1889
