= Léonard Charner =

French Navy admiral (1797–1869)

Léonard Victor Joseph Charner
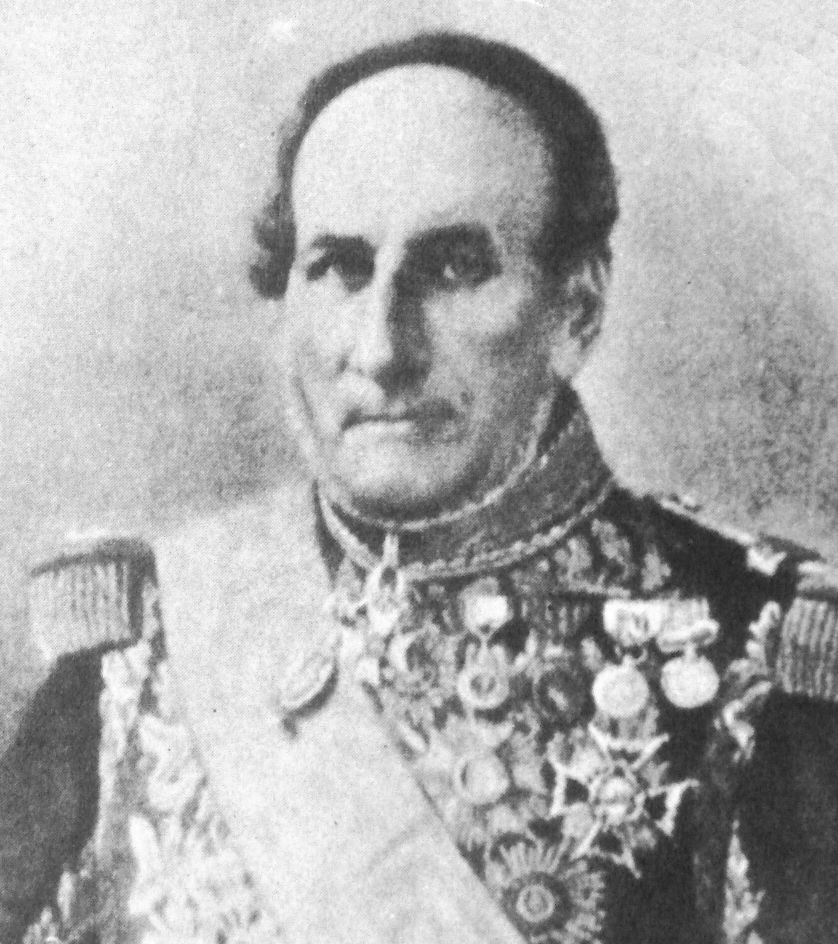
- Léonard Victor Joseph Charner

Representative of Côtes-du-Nord
- In office 13 May 1849 – 2 December 1851

Governor of Cochinchina
- In office 6 February 1861 – 30 November 1861
- Monarch: Napoleon III
- Preceded by: Joseph Hyacinthe Louis Jules d'Ariès
- Succeeded by: Louis Adolphe Bonard

Senator
- In office 22 February 1862 – 6 February 1869

Personal details
- Born: 13 February 1797 Saint-Brieuc, Côtes-d'Armor, France
- Died: 7 February 1869 (aged 71) Paris, France
- Military career
- Allegiance: France
- Branch: French Navy
- Rank: Amiral
- Conflicts: Second Opium War; Siege of Saigon; Cochinchina Campaign

Léonard Victor Joseph Charner (13 February 1797 – 7 February 1869) was an Admiral of the French Navy. As a commander of French naval forces in Asia from May 1860 to September 1861, including the Second Opium War and the Cochinchina campaign, he was a significant participant in the establishment of French Indochina.

== Early career (1797–1837) ==
Léonard Victor Joseph Charner was born on 13 February 1797 in Saint-Brieuc, Brittany. He became a cadet at the École de Marine in Toulon in February 1812, was appointed a midshipman in 1815 and served in several ships. He was promoted to enseigne de vaisseau (ensign) in 1820 and lieutenant de vaisseau (ship-of-the-line lieutenant) in 1828. He participated in the Invasion of Algiers in 1830. He recorded his observations in a memoir on the duration of naval manoeuvres. In 1832 Charner received the cross of the Legion of Honour for the capture of Ancona.

== Captain (1837–48) ==
Charner became a capitaine de corvette (lieutenant commander) in 1837. As second in command of the Belle Poule he accompanied François d'Orléans, Prince of Joinville to Saint Helena to bring back the remains of Napoleon to France in 1840 (the Retour des cendres). He was appointed capitaine de vaisseau (ship-of-the-line captain) in April 1841, and served in various naval commands during the remainder of the July Monarchy. In 1843 Charner was part of the fleet sent to the Pacific Ocean by the French Foreign Minister François Guizot under Admiral Jean-Baptiste Cécille with the diplomat Marie Melchior Joseph Théodore de Lagrené. The move responded to the Britain's victory in the First Opium War, and France hoped to counterbalance the increasing levels of British influence by accessing China from the south.

== French Second Republic (1848–51) ==
During the French Second Republic on 13 May 1849 Charner was elected representative of Côtes-du-Nord in the Legislative Assembly. He sat with the right and supported the policy of President Louis Napoleon. He was a member of the Naval Investigation Commission and was often involved in discussions on technical matters. He was also a member of the Côtes-du-Nord General Council.

== Second French Empire (1852–69) ==
After the coup d'état of 2 December 1851 Charner was appointed Chief of Staff of the Minister of the Navy. He was promoted to rear admiral on 3 February 1852, and made second in command of the Pacific Ocean Squadron in August 1853. During the Crimean War on 17 October 1854 his battleship, the Napoléon, battled for five hours with Konstantin Battery. It fired 3,000 shots and was hit by 100 cannon-balls. On 7 June 1855 he was promoted to vice-amiral. He chaired the Naval Works Committee.

In May 1860 Charner took command of the naval forces in the China seas and supported the expeditionary force during the Second Opium War. After directing the disembarkation of the troops at Peïo he directed his gunboats to attack the forts that defended the entrance to the river. He was then appointed commander in chief of the land and sea forces in Cochinchina.

As soon as the war ended, Charner left for Vietnam in January 1861 with his naval squadron and a force of 3,000 troops to support French troops under Captain Joseph Hyacinthe Louis Jules d'Ariès encircled in Saigon. On February 11, 1861, he relieved the Siege of Saigon, thereby continuing the endeavour of Admiral Charles Rigault de Genouilly, and permitting the establishment of the first French territories in Vietnam. The French Navy Minister Chasseloup-Laubat wrote to Charner: "We wish to draw commerce to Saigon (...) What we want is a sort of suzerainty or sovereignty with free trade accessible to all". After three weeks of combat, ending with the Battle of Kỳ Hòa, Charner managed to relieve the Saigon garrison. These efforts allowed the French to capture three provinces of Cochinchina.

Charner was replaced by Admiral Bonard in November 1861, who managed to obtain the recognition of the French conquests by Emperor Tự Đức in 1862, with the June 1862 Treaty of Saigon.

=== Later career ===
Charner returned to France in September 1861, and on 22 January 1862 was made a senator. Until his death he sat with the supporters of the imperial regime. He was promoted to admiral by decree of 15 November 1864. He was awarded the Grand Cross of the Legion of Honour on 10 February 1861. Charner died on 7 February 1869 in Paris. Several French Navy ships have been named after him, such as the French cruiser Amiral Charner or the Bougainville-class colonial sloop ("aviso colonial") Amiral Charner (1933) which fought at the Battle of Koh Chang in the 1941 Franco-Thai War.

== Sources ==
- Appletons' annual cyclopaedia and register of important events of the year: 1862, New York: D. Appleton & Company, 1863
- Borer, Douglas A. (1999), Superpowers Defeated: Vietnam and Afghanistan Compared, Taylor & Francis, ISBN 978-0-7146-4409-7
- Buttinger, Joseph (June 1968), Vietnam; a Political History, International Thomson Publishing, ISBN 0275177904
- Chapuis, Oscar (2000), The Last Emperors of Vietnam: From Tu Duc to Bao Dai, Greenwood Publishing Group, ISBN 978-0-313-31170-3
- CHARNER Léonard-Victor-Joseph (in French), Sénat de France
- Hall, Daniel George Edward (1966), A history of South-east Asia, "The China war ended in January 1861, and at once Admiral Charner, with a strong naval squadron and 3000 troops, left for Saigon"
- Randier, D. J. M. (2006), The Making of Modern South-East Asia: economic and social change, Editions Babouji, ISBN 2-35261-022-2, "Charner relieved the Saigon garrison after a three-week struggle which culminated in the battle of Chi Hoa"
- Robert, Adolphe; Cougny, Gaston (1889–1891), "Charner, Léonard Victor Joseph", in Edgar Bourloton (ed.), Dictionnaire des Parlementaires français (1789–1889) (in French)
- Tarling, Nicholas (2004), Imperialism in Southeast Asia, Taylor & Francis, ISBN 0203402553
- Tucker, Spencer C. (2011-05-20), The Encyclopedia of the Vietnam War: A Political, Social, and Military History, 2nd Edition [4 volumes], ABC-CLIO, ISBN 978-1-85109-961-0
