= Định Tường province =

Historic province of Vietnam

Định Tường Tỉnh Định Tường
- Province
- Interactive map of Định Tường
- Country: South Vietnam
- City: Mỹ Tho
- Established: 1832
- Dissolved: 1976

Định Tường (定祥省) was a former province of Vietnam under the Nguyễn dynasty and the South Vietnam.

== History ==
In 1832, Định Tường province was first established when Emperor Minh Mạng divided Lower Cochinchina into Six Provinces.

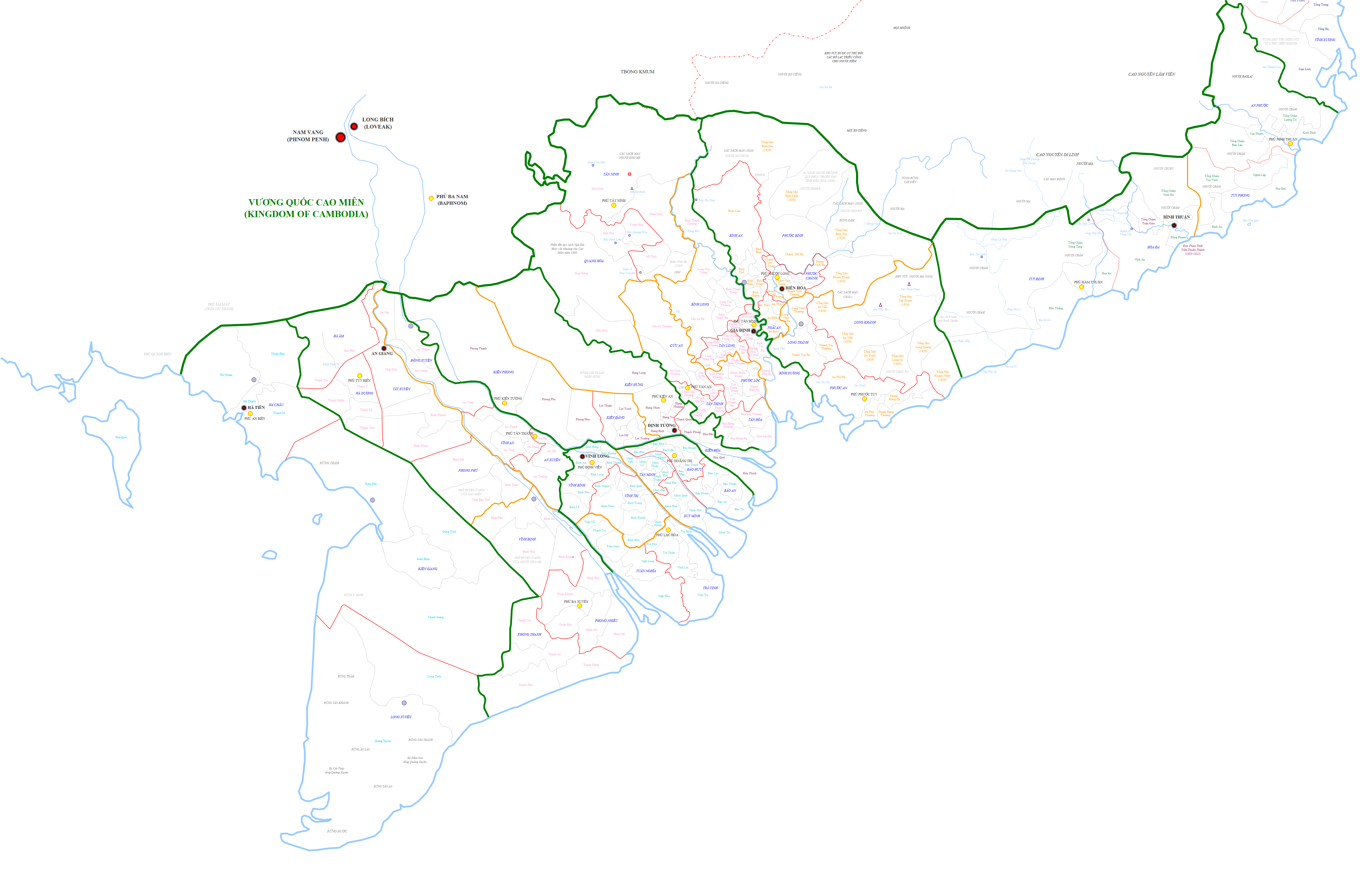
Six Provinces of Lower Cochinchina, and Bình Thuận in 1850

In the 5th year under Gia Long (1806), Gò Công together with Bến Tre belonged to Kiến Hòa canton of Kiến An prefecture, Định Tường province. In the 12th year under Minh Mạng (1831), Gò Công was separated to form Tân Hòa district. In the 1st year under Thiệu Trị (1841), Gò Công was merged into Tân An prefecture of Gia Định province, Bến Tre stayed in Định Tường province.

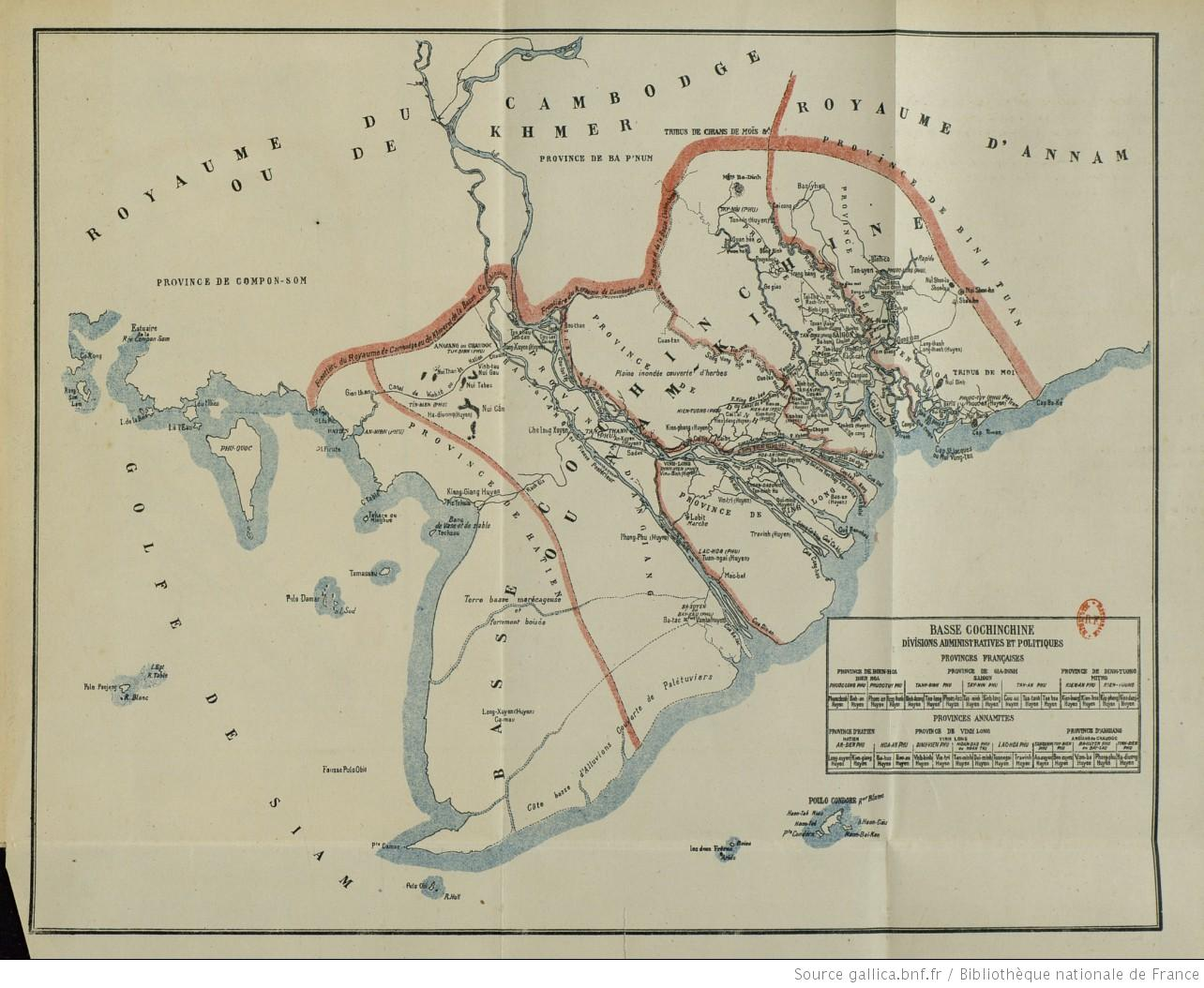
Six Provinces of Lower Cochinchina in 1861

Under the reign of Tự Đức (1847 – 1883), two of three main river islands that formed Bến Tre (Minh island and Bảo island) were merged to Vĩnh Long province under the name Hoằng Trị prefecture, only the northern An Hoá island remained in Kiến An prefecture of Định Tường.

In April 1861, the French - Spanish coalition captured Mỹ Tho, followed by Biên Hòa in December. The Nguyễn dynasty was forced to sign the Treaty of Saigon (1862), ceding three eastern provinces of Lower Cochinchina, including Định Tường to the French.

Under the Second Republic, the original Định Tường covered five provinces: Kiến Phong, Kiến Tường, Kiến Hòa, Gò Công, the new Định Tường, and a portion of Long An province.

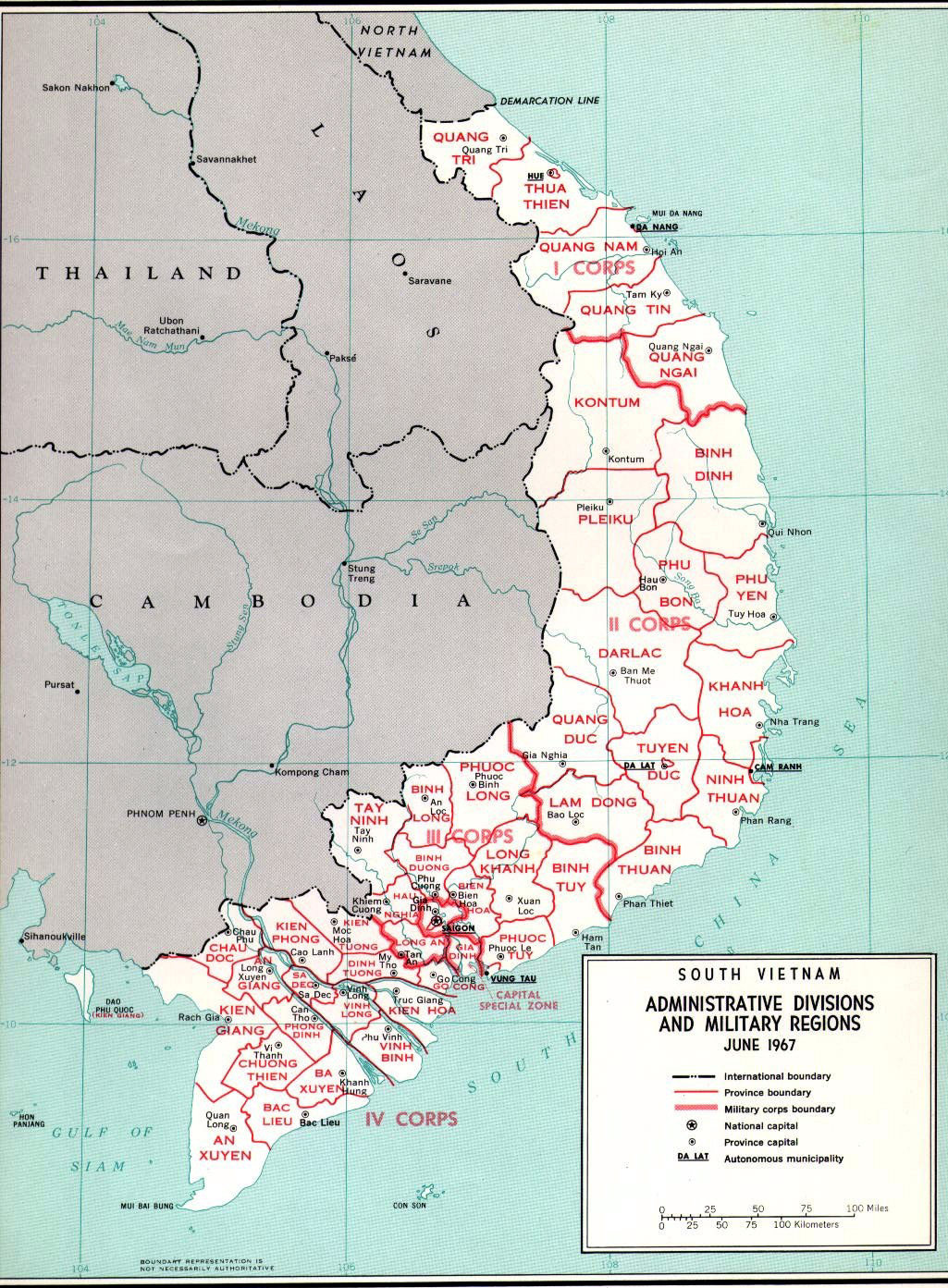
Administrative divisions and military regions of South Vietnam in 1967

In 1976, Định Tường province and Gò Công province were officially merged to form Tiền Giang province.
