= Carlos Palanca Gutiérrez =

Palanca in 1869

Carlos Palanca Gutiérrez (24 April 1819 – 16 June 1876) was a Spanish military commander and diplomat who reached the rank of field marshal.

Born in Valencia to a merchant family, Palanca studied in France before joining the army in Málaga on 18 April 1839. He served in the First Carlist War. He was stationed in Manila in 1843–1844 and in Madrid in 1844–1845. In 1852, he left again for Manila.

When France decided to launch a punitive expedition against Vietnam over the persecution of Christians in 1857, Spain placed an expeditionary force at its disposal, since the Spanish missionary bishop José María Díaz Sanjurjo had been among the victims. Palanca was second in command. For his actions in the fighting, he was promoted to lieutenant colonel and received the Légion d'Honneur from Napoleon III. In 1859, he returned to Madrid. In 1860, he was appointed minister plenipotentiary to Vietnam to negotiate a peace treaty. In 1862, he was promoted to colonel. He signed the Treaty of Saigon on 5 June 1862, bringing the war to an end. Although France obtained Cochinchina, Palanca had been ordered not to negotiate for land, although he reported that he probably could have obtained a territorial concession.

Palanca continued to participate in mopping up operations into 1863, when he returned to Spain with the rank of brigadier. In 1864, he was sent to Santo Domingo, where he contracted dysentery and had to recuperate in Santiago de Cuba. From 1864 to 1865, he was against stationed in the Philippines. When he protested his posting in Lanzarote, he was imprisoned. The Glorious Revolution of 1868 resulted in his release, promotion to field marshal and appointment as military governor of the Province of Murcia. In 1868–1870, he was posted to Puerto Rico.

In 1871, Palanca was named political governor and military commander of the Departamento Oriental in Cuba. In 1872–1873, he was Captain General of the Canaries. For his service during the Ten Years' War in Cuba, he received the Cross of Military Merit from the First Spanish Republic, which also appointed him Captain General of Burgos and Majorca. He was recalled to Madrid in 1874, where he wrote an article that offended the government, for which he was sentenced to house arrest. Through the intervention of Joaquín Jovellar y Soler, he was pardoned in 1875.

In retirement, Palanca lived in Palma de Mallorca. He visited Genoa and Turin. He died in Madrid. He published three books in his lifetime: Manual de voces de mando para las maniobras de infantería (Manila, 1854); Reseña histórica de la expedición de Cochinchina (Cartagena, 1869); and Tratado sobre colonias militares (Madrid, 1874).
