= Capture of Mỹ Tho =

- Part of Cochinchina campaign
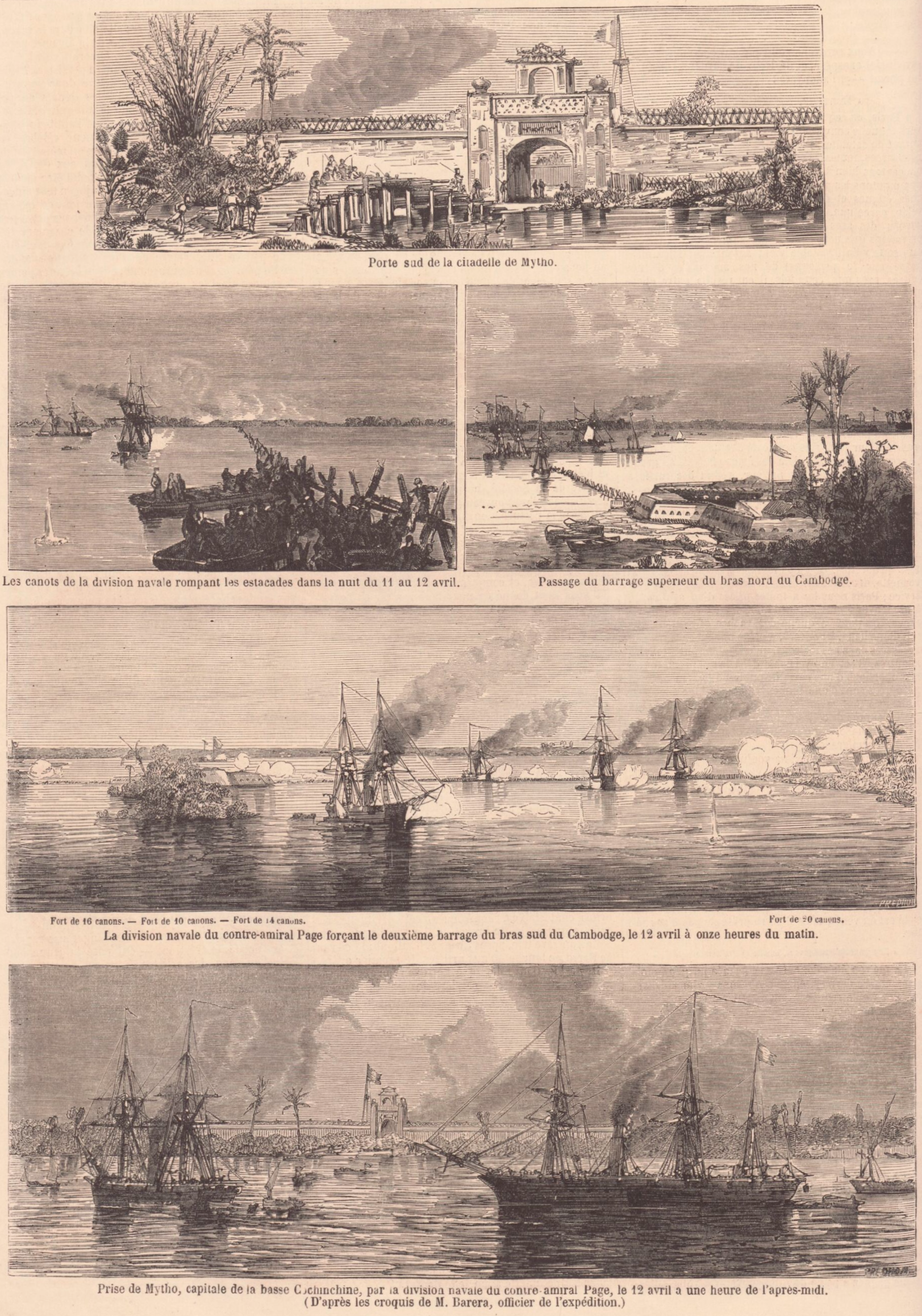
- Images from the capture of Mỹ Tho (Le Monde illustré, 1861)
Date	12 April 1861
Location	Mỹ Tho, Mekong Delta region of southern Vietnam
Result	Franco-Spanish victory

Belligerents
(Second French Empire) French Empire; (Spain) Spanish Empire; (Spain) Captaincy General of the Philippines	Nguyễn dynasty

Commanders and leaders
(Second French Empire) François Page	Unknown

The Capture of Mỹ Tho (Vietnamese: Mỹ Tho) on 12 April 1861 was an important allied victory in the Cochinchina campaign (1858–62). This campaign, fought between the French and the Spanish on the one side and the Vietnamese on the other, began as a limited punitive expedition and ended as a French war of conquest. The war concluded with the establishment of the French colony of Cochinchina, a development that inaugurated nearly a century of French colonial dominance in Vietnam.

== Background ==
After early French and Spanish victories at Tourane (Da Nang) and Saigon, the Cochinchina campaign reached a point of equilibrium in 1860. In March 1860 the allies were forced to evacuate Tourane. At the same time they were besieged in Saigon, which had been captured by a Franco-Spanish expedition under the command of Admiral Charles Rigault de Genouilly on 17 February 1859. The arrival of massive reinforcements from the French expeditionary corps in China in 1860 allowed the French to regain the initiative. In early 1861 Admiral Léonard Charner broke the Siege of Saigon by defeating the Vietnamese besieging army at the Battle of Ky Hoa (25 February 1861). This victory gave Charner the opportunity to take the offensive against the Vietnamese, and he decided to strike first at Mỹ Tho and next at Biên Hòa.

== The Mỹ Tho expedition ==
The expedition against Mỹ Tho was initially led by capitaine de frégate Bourdais, captain of the aviso Monge. Besides Monge, the other warships at his disposal were the first-class gunboats Alarme and Mitraille and the small gunboats Nos. 18 and 31, commanded respectively by lieutenants de vaisseau Sauze, Duval, Peyron and de Mauduit. The flotilla carried a landing force of 200 French sailors, 30 Spanish soldiers and one mountain mortar.

Bourdais was ordered to advance on Mỹ Tho from the north, along a creek known to the French as the Arroyo de la Poste. On 1 and 2 April he bombarded and captured two forts at the entrance to the creek, and went on to destroy a series of stockades erected by the Vietnamese to bar access.

On 4 April the expedition received important reinforcements from Saigon: 200 chasseurs, 100 sailors, two companies of marine infantry, two 40-millimetre mountain guns and two mortars. These reinforcements arrived aboard the aviso Echo. Command of the expedition was now given to Charner's aide-de-camp capitaine de vaisseau Le Couriault du Quilio, assisted by capitaine de frégate Allizé de Montignicourt as chief of staff. A further reinforcement of 100 sailors arrived on 6 April, under the command of capitaine de frégate Desvaux.

Between 6 and 11 April Le Couriault du Quilio's expedition fought its way along the Arroyo de la Poste, against Vietnamese resistance of varying intensity.

On 8 April the expedition was reinforced with three more gunboats (Nos. 16, 20 and 22), commanded respectively by lieutenants de vaisseau Gougeard, Béhic and Salmon.

On the evening of 9 April the Vietnamese launched two fireships against the French gunboats. Enseignes de vaisseau Joucla and Besnard took both vessels under tow and ran them aground in a tributary creek, where they burned themselves out.

On 10 April a French scouting party led by Captain du Chaffault advanced up to the walls of Mỹ Tho and exchanged shots with the defenders before returning to make its report. Le Couriault du Quilio pressed forward with his gunboats, which were towing several sloops carrying 300 soldiers and sailors. Capitaine de frégate Bourdais, the original expedition commander, led an attack on Fort No. 5 with Gunboat No. 18 (see map), but was killed by a cannonball in the first exchange of fire. The French gunboats soon beat down the fire of the fort, and its defenders abandoned it before it was assaulted. The capture of this fort, renamed Fort Bourdais by the French, opened the route to Mỹ Tho.

On 11 April the expedition closed up on Mỹ Tho, and prepared to assault the town on the following day. In the event, the assault was not necessary. A flotilla of warships under the command of Admiral François Page, who had been sent by Charner to sail up the Mekong river to attack Mỹ Tho by sea, presented itself before the town on 12 April. Mỹ Tho was occupied by the French on the same day without a shot being fired.

== Bibliography ==
- Taboulet, G., La geste française en Indochine (Paris, 1956)
- Thomazi, A., La conquête de l'Indochine (Paris, 1934)
- Thomazi, A., Histoire militaire de l'Indochine française (Hanoi, 1931)
