= Louis Adolphe Bonard =

French admiral

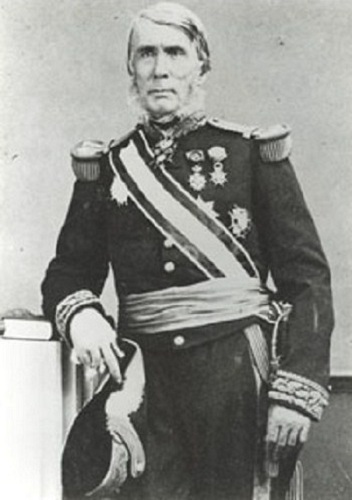

Commandant of Oceania
- In office 1850–1852
- Preceded by: Charles François Lavaud
- Succeeded by: Théogène François Page

Governor of French Guiana
- In office 1854–1855
- Monarch: Napoleon III
- Preceded by: Martin Fourichon
- Succeeded by: Antoine Alphonse Masset

Governor of Cochinchina
- In office 30 November 1861 – 16 October 1863
- Monarch: Napoleon III
- Preceded by: Léonard Charner
- Succeeded by: Pierre-Paul de La Grandière

Personal details
- Born: 27 March 1805 Cherbourg, Manche, France
- Died: 31 March 1867 (aged 62) Vanves, Hauts de Seine, France
- Occupation: Naval officer

Louis Adolphe Bonard (French pronunciation: [lwi adɔlf bɔnaʁ]; 27 March 1805 – 31 March 1867) was a French admiral who served in the Mediterranean and then for many years in the Pacific. He was governor of French Guiana from 1853 to 1855, and governor of Cochinchina (southern Vietnam) from 1861 to 1863.

== Life ==
=== Early career (1805–42) ===
Louis-Adolphe Bonard was born on 27 March 1805 in Cherbourg, Manche. He graduated from the École Polytechnique in 1825 and chose to join the navy. In 1829 Bonard was on the Silène, which was wrecked near Algiers on the night of 14–15 May 1929. He was taken prisoner by the Algerians. He was promoted to enseigne de vaisseau (ensign) on 10 November 1830 for his conduct during the Invasion of Algiers in 1830. He served in the Mediterranean in 1831–33 on the Sphynx and the Palinure.

Bonard was promoted to lieutenant de vaisseau (ship-of-the-line lieutenant) in March 1831. In 1833 he served on the Grenadier in the Levant. In 1834 he was harbour master in Mers El Kébir, Oran, Algeria. In 1836–38 he was second in command of the Docouédic in the Levant. On 4 February 1836 he was made a Knight of the Legion of Honour. In 1838–39 he commanded the Iris on the Algerian coast, then the Euryale on the Newfoundland station. In 1840–42 he commanded the brigo-aviso Volage in the Mediterranean.

=== Oceania and Guiana (1842–61) ===
Bonard was promoted to capitaine de corvette (lieutenant commander) on 6 September 1842. He was second in command on the Uranie in the Pacific. Bonard arrived in Polynesia in 1843. He was made Officer of the Legion of Honour on 17 October 1844. In December 1845 he intervened to maintain French authority over Bora Bora against English claims.

During the Franco-Tahitian War (1844–1847) Bonard played a very active role as the commander of the Uranie and then commander of land forces in the battles of Mahaena and then Faaa, where he was wounded. He was defeated at the landing in Huahine by the forces of Queen Teriitaria II, but succeeded in the capture of Fort Fautaua in November 1846. He was promoted to capitaine de vaisseau (ship-of-the-line captain) on 12 July 1847. In July 1849 he was commander of the naval subdivision of Oceania and French Commissioner in the Society Islands. He returned to France in 1852.

In December 1853 Bonard was appointed Governor of French Guiana. He was made Commander of the Legion of Honour on 9 December 1854. After an attack of yellow fever he returned to France in December 1855. Bonard was promoted to contre-amiral (counter admiral) on 1 December 1855. He was appointed major general of the navy at Brest. He was promoted to Commander of the Legion of Honour on 6 January 1856. In 1857 Bonard was commander of the naval stations of the western coasts of America and Oceania. He introduced several plants to Polynesia including Rio banana (Musa sapientum), cassava and new varieties of mango, avocado and guava.

=== Cochinchina (1861–63 ===
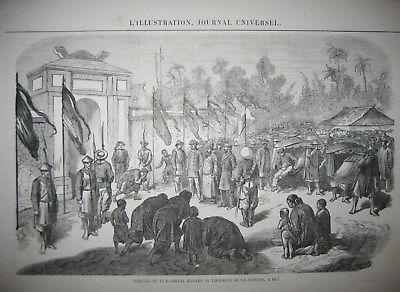
Arrival of Bonard in Hué in April 1863

On 29 November 1861 Bonard took command of French forces in Cochinchina and was the first to hold the official title of Governor of Cochinchina. In December 1861 he captured the province of Biên Hòa, and in March 1862 captured the province of Vĩnh Long. On 5 June 1862 he negotiated the Treaty of Saigon with the representative of the Vietnamese emperor Tự Đức under which the French were granted rule over the provinces of Gia Định, Định Tường and Bien Hoa and the island of Poulo Condore (Côn Đảo). Bonard was promoted to vice admiral on 25 June 1862. Tự Đức ratified the agreement with the Treaty of Huế in April 1863.

Bonard gave a Colonel Coffyn the task of developing a plan for a city of 500,000 people, a visionary concept since at the time Saigon had population of about 40,000 Chinese, 10,000 Vietnamese and 600 Europeans. He built a military hospital in Saigon, set up schools to teach the Vietnamese language to his officers, and introduced the French language to the local schools. He hoped to govern the colony indirectly through Annamese mandarins under the direction of a small number of French officers, but most of the mandarins refused to serve under the French. The French colonists disliked his conciliatory approach. The missionaries saw the mandarins, with their Confucian and Buddhist culture, as obstacles to the spread of Christianity. A revolt led by the mandarins in 1862–63 was only suppressed with difficulty.

Bonard was promoted to vice-amiral on 25 June 1862. After restoring peace and obtaining the Treaty of Huế, Bonard returned to France on 30 April 1863. Pierre-Paul de La Grandière was appointed to succeed him on 1 May 1863.

=== Last years (1863–67) ===
Bonard intended to return to Cochinchina but his health would not allow it. He was appointed maritime prefect of the 4th maritime district in Rochefort, Charente-Maritime. In 1864 he was a member of the Admiralty Council. He was promoted to Grand Officer of the Legion of Honour on 13 January 1864. He was appointed prefect of Cherbourg in 1867. Bonard died on 31 March 1867 in Vanves, Hauts de Seine, and is buried in the Amiens cemetery.
