= Siege of Saigon =

1859 French-Vietnamese battle

- Part of the Cochinchina campaign
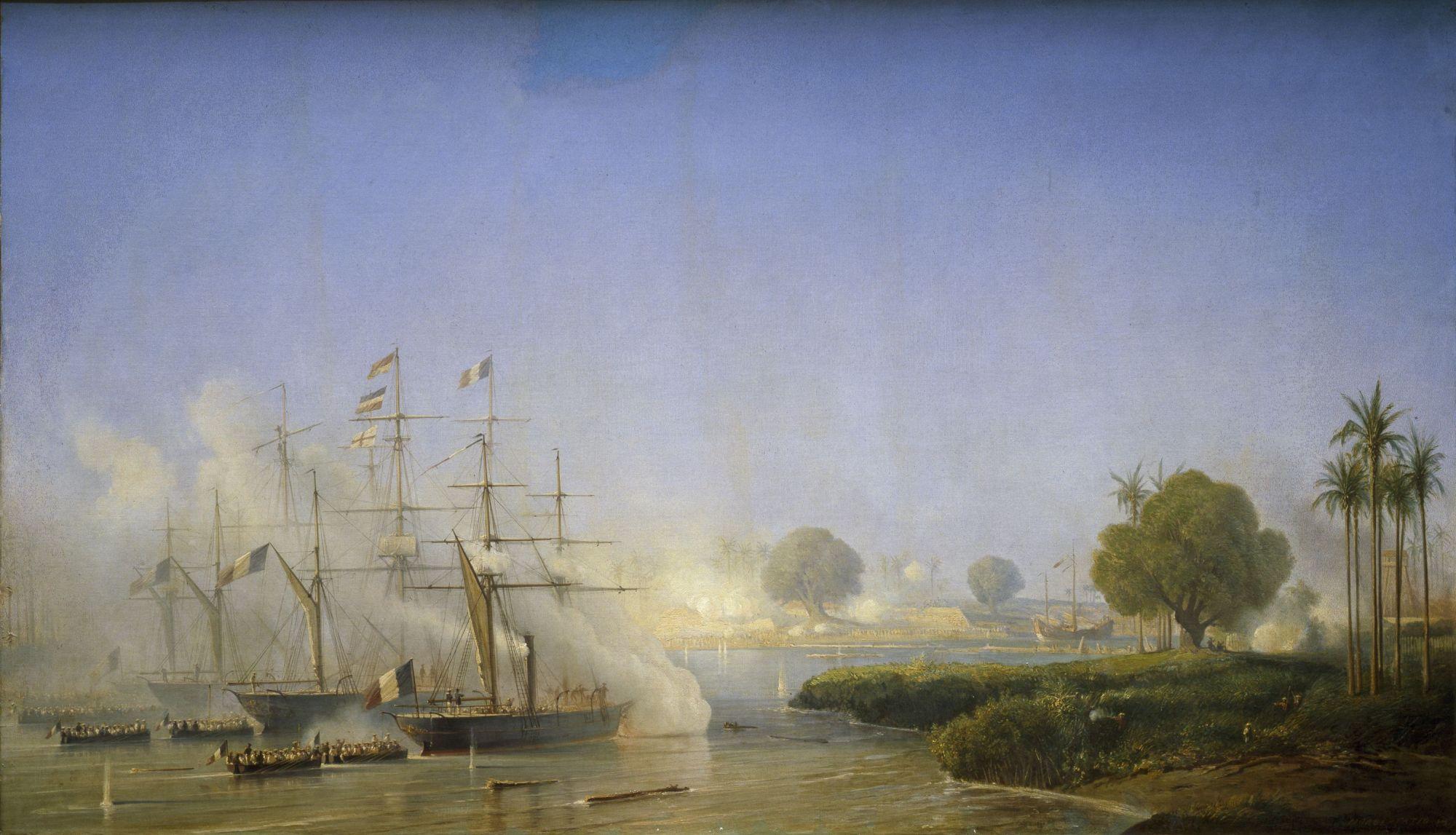
- Capture of Saigon, 18 February 1859; Antoine Léon Morel-Fatio, 1867
Date	18 February 1859 – 25 February 1861 (2 years and 1 week)
Location	Gia Định, Nam Kỳ, Đại Nam
Result	Franco-Spanish victory

Belligerents
(Second French Empire) French Empire (Spain) Spanish Empire	Đại Nam

Commanders and leaders
(Second French Empire) Rigault de Genouilly	Vũ Duy Ninh; Trương Văn Uyển

The siege of Saigon, a two-year siege of the city by the Vietnamese after its capture on 17 February 1859 by a Franco-Spanish flotilla under the command of the French admiral Charles Rigault de Genouilly, was one of the major events of the Cochinchina campaign (1858–1862). Saigon was of great strategic importance, both as the key food-producing area of Vietnam and as the gateway to Cochinchina.

== Background ==
In 1858, Admiral Charles Rigault de Genouilly attacked Vietnam under the orders of Napoleon III following the failed mission of diplomat Charles de Montigny. His stated mission was to stop the persecution of Catholic missionaries in the country and assure the unimpeded propagation of the faith. For his descent on Vietnam, Rigault de Genouilly had a force of 14 warships, 1,000 French marine infantry, and 1,000 troops from the Spanish garrisons of the Philippines (550 Spanish infantry and 450 Filipino light infantry). The allied force landed at the port of Tourane in September 1858 and occupied the city after a brief bombardment. However, the allies were soon placed under siege by the Vietnamese and, unable to advance inland beyond the protection of the squadron's guns, were effectively immobilised at Tourane.

== Capture of Saigon, 17 February 1859 ==
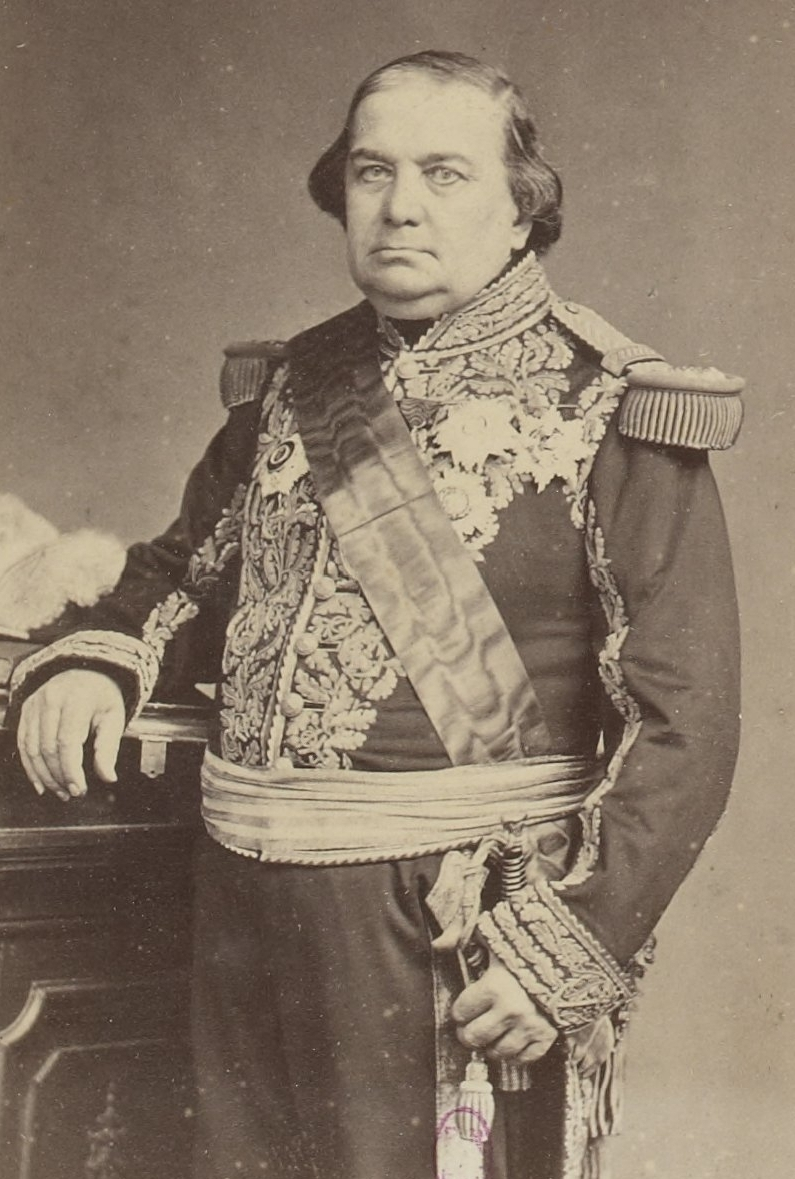
Admiral Charles Rigault de Genouilly (1807–73)

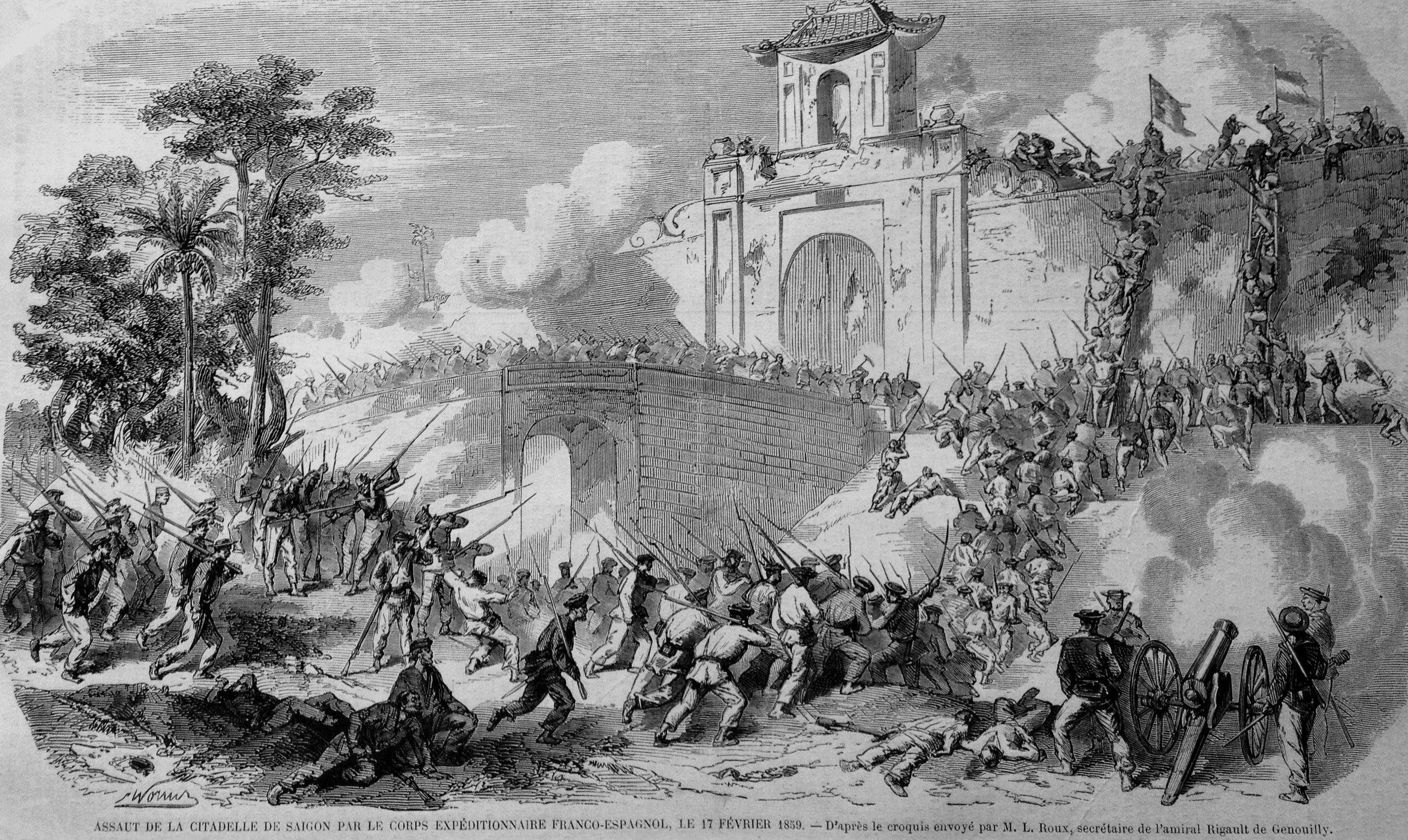
French capture of Saigon in 1859.

Realising that the French garrison at Tourane could achieve nothing useful, Rigault de Genouilly decided to strike elsewhere against the Vietnamese. He considered and rejected the possibility of an expedition to Tonkin, and in January 1859 proposed to the navy ministry an expedition against Saigon in Cochinchina, a city of considerable strategic significance as a source of food for the Vietnamese army. The expedition was approved, and on 2 February, leaving capitaine de vaisseau Thoyon at Tourane with a small French garrison and two gunboats, Rigault de Genouilly sailed south for Saigon. His naval force consisted of the corvettes Phlégéton and Primauguet, the gunboats Alarme, Avalanche and Dragonne, the Spanish despatch vessel El Cano and the transports Saône, Durance and Meurthe.

Rigault de Genouilly halted for five days in Cam Ranh Bay for four supply ships to join him with food for the expedition. On 9 February, he again got underway. On 10 February, the allied flotilla bombarded the forts that defended the interior harbour of Cape Saint-Jacques and soon reduced their cannon to silence. The landing companies, a mixed force of French and Spanish soldiers under the command of capitaine de vaisseau Reynaud, then went ashore and stormed the forts.

On 11 February, the five-day voyage upriver began. The transports and the baggage were left at Cap Saint-Jacques. The gunboat Dragonne scouted ahead, followed by the two other gunboats, the two corvettes and the Spanish despatch vessel. Three companies of marine infantry and two Spanish companies, 2,000 men in all, were distributed among the vessels which towed the launches of the naval force. The allied flotilla advanced cautiously as the currents were unknown, and anchored each night in the river. During their passage, the French and Spanish vessels halted to reduced six riverside forts, and squads of engineers under the command of capitaine de génie Gallimard were put ashore to burn the wooden stockades that linked the forts. The Vietnamese defended themselves vigorously: Dragonne was hit with three cannonballs, and Avalanche by seven. The invaders took care to ensure that the river could not be closed behind them. After each fort was taken their cannons were either spiked or taken aboard the ships.

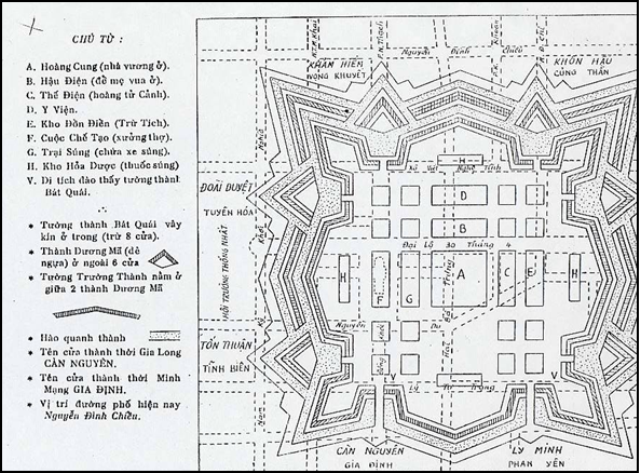
The Citadel of Saigon, built and modeled after the French Vauban fortresses in 1790

On the evening of 15 February, the naval division (which had been joined in the river by the despatch vessel Prégent) arrived in view of the two forts built by Gia Long's French engineers, which defended Saigon from the south. During the night two armed launches were sent forward to destroy a barrage made of boats lashed together and filled with explosives. At dawn on 16 February Phlégéton, Primauguet, Alarme and Avalanche anchored 800 metres from the forts. The channel was so narrow that Admiral Charner, on Phlégéton's bridge, was able to shout his orders to the captains of the other vessels. Prégent, Dragonne and Elcano were a little further back.

The allied flotilla opened fire on the Vietnamese forts and soon found the range. Marine infantry snipers, firing from the mastheads of the French and Spanish ships, picked off the Vietnamese gunners. The Vietnamese responded vigorously, but their aim was uncertain, and the French and Spaniards soon beat down their fire. The landing companies were sent ashore to assault the forts, and by 8 a.m. both forts were in Spanish hands.

Later the same day capitaine de frégate Bernard Jauréguiberry, the future French admiral and navy minister, scouted the Citadel of Saigon aboard Avalanche. On the morning of 17 February the French and Spanish went ashore and assaulted the citadel. Sergeant des Pallières of the marine infantry was the first to enter the citadel, and once the allies were inside the Vietnamese garrison retreated. A force of around 1,000 Vietnamese soldiers attempted to counterattack. Admiral Charner, who was personally directing the action, threw back their attack with Colonel Lanzarote's Filipino troops. At 10 a.m. the French and Spanish flags flew above the citadel.

== Allied occupation of Saigon, February 1859 – February 1860 ==
The citadel of Saigon was enormous, and the allies did not have enough men to hold it securely. Rigault de Genouilly therefore decided to blow it up. Thirty-two mines were prepared, and on 8 March 1859 the citadel was wrecked. The rice magazines were also set alight, and burned for several months.

In April 1859, Rigault de Genouilly returned to Tourane with the bulk of his forces, leaving only a small garrison under the command of capitaine de frégate Bernard Jauréguiberry to hold Saigon. Jauréguiberry's force consisted of a company of French marine infantry, a company of Filipino light infantry under Spanish command, and 400 sailors to work the French artillery. Rigault also left the corvette Primauguet, the gunboats Avalanche and Dragonne and the transport Durance at Saigon. The French repaired the Southern Fort, captured from the Vietnamese in February, and converted it into a stronghold for the garrison.

On 21 April 1859, Jauréguiberry launched a surprise attack on a Vietnamese fortification that had been built to the west of the town. The allied attack succeeded and the Vietnamese position was burnt down, but allied casualties were 14 dead and 31 wounded out of a total of 800 men engaged. This was such a heavy loss, given the limited allied numbers, that Jauréguiberry made no further attacks. The Franco-Spanish garrison of Saigon withdrew to the Southern Fort and bided its time.

== Siege of Saigon, March 1860 – February 1861 ==
The capture of Saigon proved to be as hollow a victory for the French and Spaniards as their earlier capture of Da Nang. Jauréguiberry's force at Saigon was too small to venture out of its defences, while Captain Thoyon's small French garrison in Da Nang had been placed under siege by the Vietnamese. Meanwhile, the French government was distracted from its Far Eastern ambitions by the outbreak of the Austro-Sardinian War, which tied down large numbers of French troops in Italy. In November 1859, Rigault de Genouilly, whose actions in Cochinchina had come under severe criticism in France, was replaced by Admiral François Page, who was instructed to obtain a treaty protecting the Catholic faith in Vietnam but not to seek any territorial gains.

The Vietnamese, aware of France's distraction in Italy, refused these modest terms and spun out the negotiations in the hope that the allies would cut their losses and abandon the campaign altogether. Meanwhile, the French were unable to reinforce the garrisons of Da Nang and Saigon. Although the Austro-Sardinian War soon ended, by early 1860 the French were again at war with China, and Page had to divert most of his forces to support Admiral Léonard Charner's China expedition.

In April 1860 Page left Cochinchina to join Charner at Canton, and the defense of Saigon and the neighbouring Chinese town of Cholon, an important commercial centre, was entrusted to capitaine de vaisseau Jules d'Ariès. To garrison these two towns d'Ariès had a mere 600 marine infantrymen and 200 Spanish troops under the command of Colonel Palanca y Guttierez, supported by the corvettes Primauguet, Norzagaray and Laplace. To augment this modest force the French armed a number of junks to patrol the rivers, and also recruited Annamese and Chinese auxiliaries to take part in the patrols and man the advanced posts.

In March 1860, the Franco-Spanish force in Saigon, only 1,000 men strong, was placed under siege by a Vietnamese army of about 10,000 men, and had to support an eleven-month siege by greatly superior numbers. At the same time, French strength was also being drained by the Siege of Đà Nẵng (September 1858 to March 1860), and in March 1860 the French evacuated Da Nang.

== End of the siege ==
Finally, in the wake of the Anglo-French victory at the Battle of Palikao on 21 September 1860, which ended the war in China, reinforcements of 70 ships under Admiral Charner and 3,500 soldiers under General de Vassoigne were dispatched to Saigon. Charner's squadron, the most powerful French naval force seen in Vietnamese waters before the creation of the French Far East Squadron on the eve of the Sino-French War (August 1884–April 1885), included the steam frigates Impératrice Eugénie and Renommée (Charner and Page's respective flagships), the corvettes Primauguet, Laplace and Duchayla, eleven screw-driven despatch vessels, five first-class gunboats, seventeen transports and a hospital ship. The squadron was accompanied by half a dozen armed lorchas purchased in Macao.

After the arrival of these massive reinforcements, the French were able to defeat the besieging Vietnamese at the Battle of Kỳ Hòa on 25 February 1861 and raise the siege.
