= Treaty of Huế (1863) =

1863 treaty between Vietnam and France

Phan Thanh Giản and the Vietnamese embassy negotiating in Marseilles, France.

The Treaty of Huế is a treaty signed on April 14, 1863, between representatives of Đại Nam and the French Empire.

== Terms ==
Based on the terms of the accord, three Vietnamese ports were opened (Đà Nẵng, Ba Lạt and Quảng Yên). Moreover, freedom of missionary activity was permitted and Vietnam's foreign affairs were under French imperial protection. Saigon, seized by the French in 1862, was declared the capital of French Cochinchina.

Overall, the treaty confirmed the tenets of the First Treaty of Saigon.

== See also ==
- Imperialism in Asia
- List of treaties
