= Treaty of Saigon (1862) =

1862 treaty between Vietnam and France

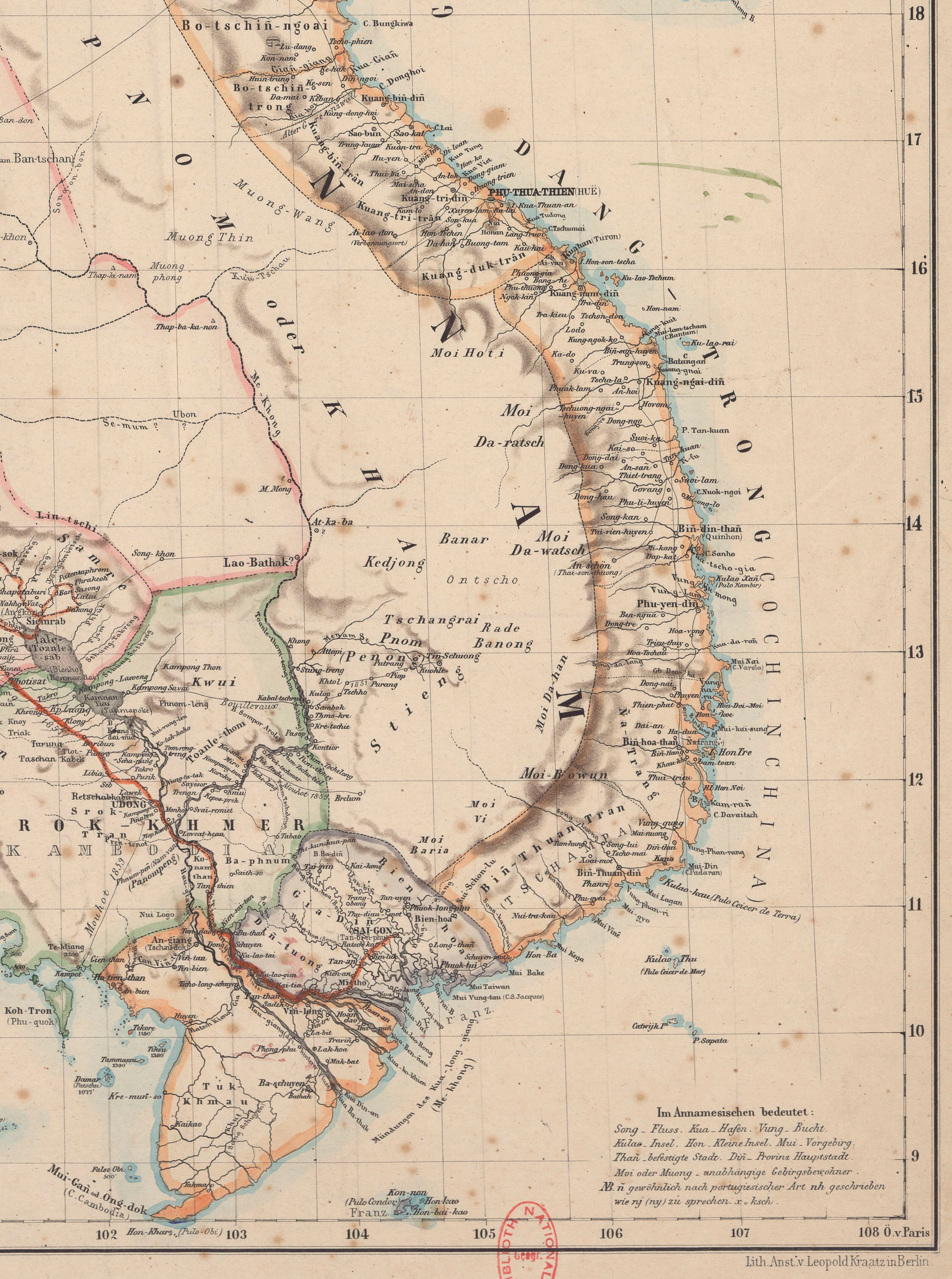
Map showing the territory ceded (in purple) to France in the Treaty of Saigon (1862).

The Treaty of Saigon (French: Traité de Saïgon, Vietnamese: Hòa ước Nhâm Tuất, referring to the year of "Water Dog" in the sexagenary cycle) was signed on 5 June 1862 between representatives of the colonial powers, France and Spain, and the last precolonial emperor of the Nguyễn dynasty, Emperor Tự Đức after the coalition's invasion during the Cochinchina campaign. The signatories were Louis Adolphe Bonard (France), Carlos Palanca Gutiérrez (Spain) and Phan Thanh Giản (Vietnam). Based on the terms of the accord, Tự Đức ceded Saigon, the island of Poulo Condor and three southern provinces of what was to become known as Cochinchina (Bien Hoa, Gia Dinh, and Dinh Tuong) to the French. The treaty was confirmed by the Treaty of Huế signed on 14 April 1863.

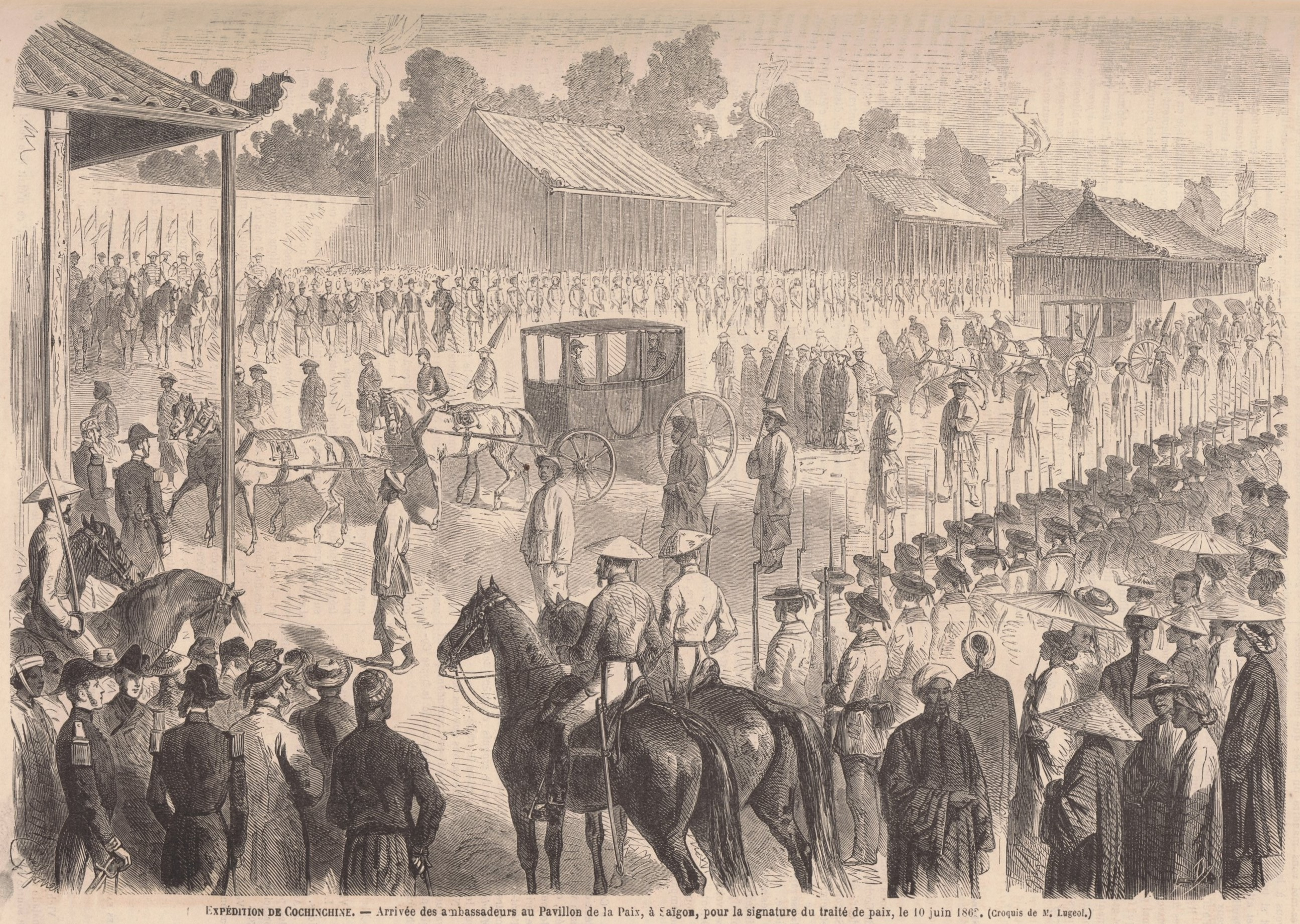
Signing treaty at Saigon, 1862

== See also ==
- French conquest of Vietnam
- Western imperialism in Asia
