= Noël Pardon =

French colonial administrator

Marie Jacques Noël Pardon

Acting Governor of Cochinchina
- In office 23 October 1887 – 2 November 1887
- President: Jules Grévy
- Governor: Jean Antoine Ernest Constans
- Preceded by: Ange Michel Filippini
- Succeeded by: Jules Georges Piquet

Acting Governor of New Caledonia
- In office 12 January 1889 – 14 April 1891
- President: Sadi Carnot
- Preceded by: Delphino Moracchini
- Succeeded by: Émile Gustave Laffon

Governor of Guadeloupe
- In office 1894–1895
- President: Jean Casimir-Perier; Sadi Carnot
- Preceded by: Louis Hippolyte Marie Nouet
- Succeeded by: Jean Jules Armand Charles Couzinet (acting)

Governor of Martinique
- In office 10 Jun 1895 – 12 July 1898
- President: Félix Faure
- Preceded by: Delphino Moracchini
- Succeeded by: Marie Louis Gustave Gabrié

Personal details
- Born: 4 June 1854 Chalon-sur-Saône, France
- Died: 12 July 1910 (aged 56) Oxus, between Madagascar and Paris
- Occupation: Colonial administrator

Marie Jacques Noël Pardon (4 June 1854 – 12 July 1910) was a French colonial administrator. He served in Cochinchina, New Caledonia, and as Governor of Guadeloupe and Martinique. After leaving the colonial service he was involved in various private enterprises to develop the colonies.

== Career ==
=== Early years (1854–89) ===
Noël Pardon was born on 4 June 1854 in Chalon-sur-Saône. He became a Doctor of Law and a colonial administrator.

Noël Pardon was appointed secretary general of the prefecture of the Loire. In 1886 he was appointed Director of the Interior of Cochinchina. He was Acting Governor of Cochinchina from October to November 1887.

=== New Caledonia (1889–91) ===
Pardon was Acting Governor of New Caledonia from 1889 to 1891. He arrived in New Caledonia early in 1889. He was concerned about the shortage of agricultural laborers, and about the lack of supervision of workers hired privately. He supported the official resumption of indentured servitude as long as recruitment was regulated, as demanded by the General Council, an advisory body that represented the free citizens of the colony. In 1890 Pardon submitted a proposal for land reform in New Caledonia to the Extra-Parliamentary Committee of the Cadastre. He wanted to apply the Torrens title system in the colony, which would allow for the appropriation and sale of lands to private individuals, with the profit used to cover the colony's costs. There would be no difficulty with indigenous legislation, since there was none, unlike the complications that arose in more advanced countries such as Tunisia.

In 1893 Pardon ran unsuccessfully for election to the legislature for Firminy, Loire.

=== Guadeloupe (1894–95) ===
Pardon was governor of Guadeloupe from 1894 to 1895. He gave a detail report in the island's economy in 1894 to the Minister of the Colonies, concluding that "politics must be held responsible for the poor finances." Workers in Guadeloupe had been receiving steadily lower wages over the last decade, while prices had been rising in part due to the Méline tariff and in part to the bank's manipulation of the exchange rate between the Guadeloupe franc and the French franc. He wrote to the Minister of the Colonie on 20 April 1895 that the workers live "exclusively on factory wages, buy everything and do not have, at least in wide stretches of this land, a manioc, sweet potato plant, or a breadfruit tree." Their supposed representatives in parliament had little interest in helping the workers.

Pardon blamed the sugar crisis in the island on poor decisions by past colonial officials and the industry leaders, who had failed to diversify into other industries. However, he did not have a good alternative. By continuing to support the industry the administration was supporting sugar planters and manufacturers who were typically opposed to the Republic, but failure to support it would cause economic crisis and push workers towards socialism and revolutionary politics.

=== Martinique (1895–98) ===
In June 1895 Delphino Moracchini was transferred to become Governor of Guadeloupe. He exchanged places with Pardon, who became governor of Martinique. In a letter of 30 January 1896 to the Minister of the Marine and the Colonies Pardon mentioned several outbreaks of typhoid and yellow fever. In August 1896 Pardon confirmed that two patients had died of yellow fever in Fort-de-France that month, while two suspected cases had been isolated and expected to live. The outbreak seemed to have been contained. In 1897 he was placed on leave without pay. On 12 July 1898 Pardon was replaced as Governor of Martinique by Marie Louis Gustave Gabrié.

=== Company director (1898–1910) ===
In September 1898 the Écho des mines et de la métallurgie announced that the Société industrielle et commerciale du Soudan français (Industrial and Commercial Society of the French Sudan) had been founded with a capital of 1,400,000 francs. Noël Pardon was listed first among the directors. He was also a director of the industrial and commercial company of Indo-China. Pardon was president of a delegation to support opening the interior of the African colonies that addressed a memorandum on 5 February 1900 to the Colonial Minister noting the usefulness of territorial concessions for development of settlements. In 1904 he went on a mission to the United States on behalf of the Wyoming Union. That year he was counsel in New Caledonia of the International Nickel Company. Pardon died on 12 July 1910 aboard the Oxus, on which he had embarked in Madagascar.

== Publications ==
Publication by Noël Pardon include:

- Noël Pardon (1888), Aperçu sur la situation réelle des budgets d'Indo-Chine, Paris: Impr. de G. Chamerot, p. 45
- Charles-Marie Le Myre de Vilers; Noël Pardon (15 March 1888), Organisation administrative de l'Indochine française. Projet de rapport au président de la République, p. 22
- Paul Branda; Noël Pardon (1889), Le Haut-Mékong, ou le Laos ouvert (Nouvelle édition, contenant une carte du Haut-Mékong), Paris: Fischbacher, p. 88
- Noël Pardon (1891), Rapport et projet de décret sur la conservation et la transmission de la propriété foncière, des hypothèques et des autres droits réels immobiliers en Nouvelle-Calédonie (Torrens Act), Paris: Impr. nationale / Ministère du commerce, de l'industrie et des colonies. Sous-secrétariat d'Etat des colonies., p. 64
- Tucker, Julius G. (September 4, 1896), "MARTINIQUE, WEST INDIES. Two cases of yellow fever in Martinique", Public Health Reports, 11 (36): 843, JSTOR 41436475

== Sources ==
- "Banque de Cochinchine (1908-1910)" (PDF), entreprises-coloniales.fr (in French), 22 June 2018
- Cahoon, Ben, "Martinique", Worldstatsemen.org
- Garnier, Gustave (1897), Legislation domaniale et propriété foncière dans les colonies et pays de protectorat franc̦ais (in French), A. Challamel
- Heath, Elizabeth (2014-10-09), Wine, Sugar, and the Making of Modern France: Global Economic Crisis and the Racialization of French Citizenship, 1870–1910, Cambridge University Press, ISBN 978-1-107-07058-5
- Lampin, Didier, "Delphino Moracchini (1846-1903)", La Martinique à la carte...
- McCloy, Shelby T. (2015-01-13), The Negro in the French West Indies, University Press of Kentucky, ISBN 978-0-8131-6396-3
- Noël Pardon (1854-1910), BnF: Bibliotheque nationale de France
- Rabut, Elisabeth (1979), "Le Mythe Parisien de la Mise en Valeur des Colonies Africaines a l'Aube du XXe Siecle: La Commission des Concessions Coloniales 1898-1912", The Journal of African History (in French), 20 (2): 271–287, doi:10.1017/s0021853700017060, JSTOR 181518
- Shineberg, Dorothy (1999), The People Trade: Pacific Island Laborers and New Caledonia, 1865-1930, University of Hawaii Press, ISBN 978-0-8248-2177-7
- "Société industrielle et commerciale du Soudan français" (PDF), entreprises-coloniales (in French)
- Stéhlé, Guy (November 1995), "Deux gouverneurs des Antilles", G.H.C. Bulletin (in French) (76)
