= Saigon Governor's Palace =

French administrative building in Saigon, colonial Vietnam (1873–1962)

- Palais du Gouverneur, Saigon
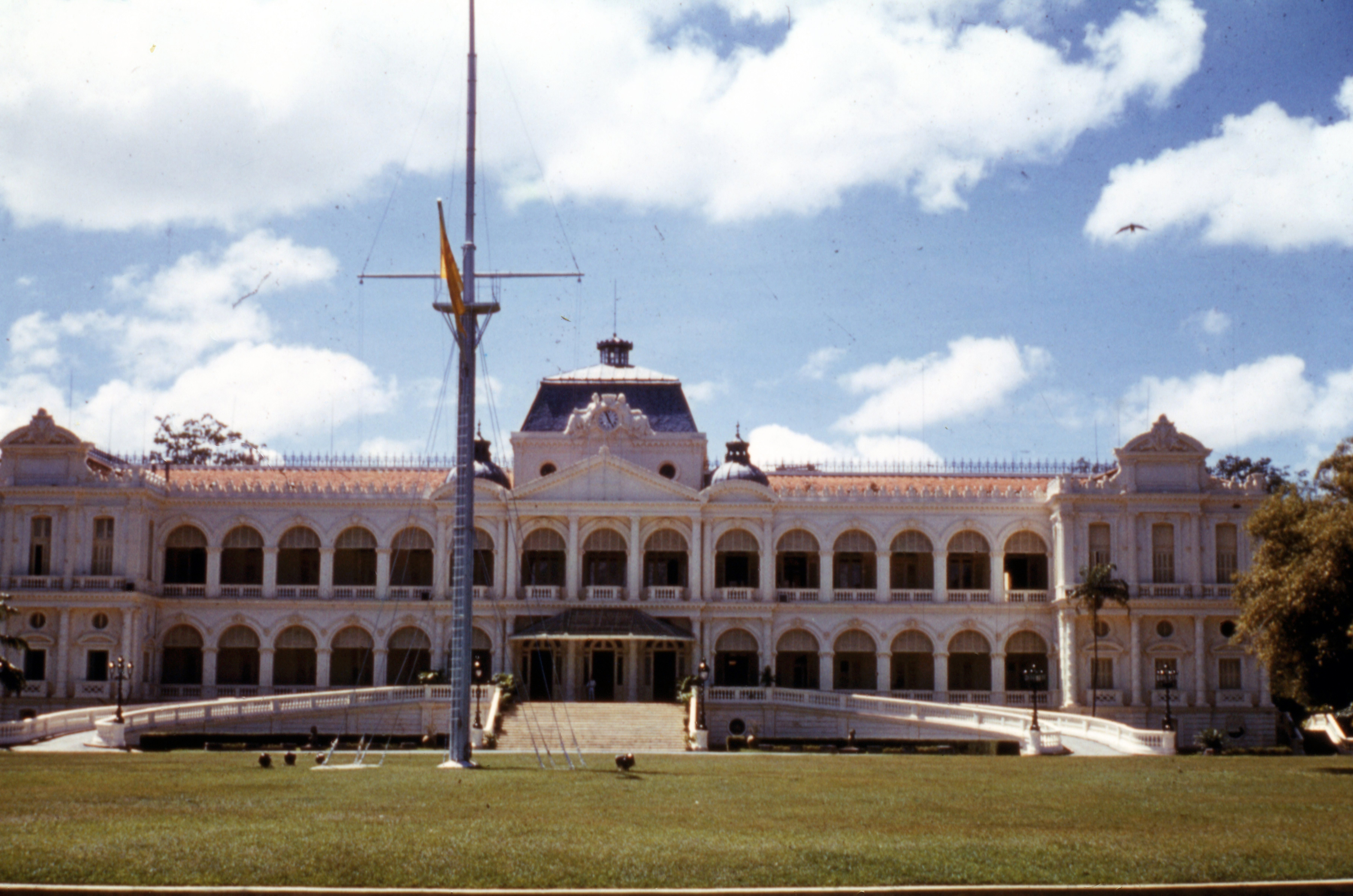
- The Governor's Palace in Saigon, 1961

- Location within Vietnam
- Alternative names: Norodom Palace, Independence Palace

General information
- Status: Demolished
- Type: Head of state residence
- Architectural style: Neo-Baroque
- Location: Rue Mac-Mahon, Saigon, French Indochina
- Coordinates: 10.776944°N 106.695278°E
- Groundbreaking: 23 March 1868
- Inaugurated: 1873
- Demolished: 1962

Technical details
- Floor count: 2

Design and construction
- Architect: Achille-Antoine Hermitte

The Saigon Governor's Palace (French: Palais du Gouverneur, Saigon; Vietnamese: Dinh Thống đốc Sài Gòn), also known as the Norodom Palace (Vietnamese: Dinh Norodom) after the nearby street, which was named after the Norodom of Cambodia, was a government building in Saigon, French Cochinchina, built between 1868 and 1873. It was then rebuilt and renamed as Independence Palace during the Republic of Vietnam.

It contained the residence of the governor of Cochinchina, administrative offices, reception rooms and ballrooms. The imposing and very expensive neo-Baroque building was intended to impress the people of Saigon with the power and wealth of the French. In October 1887 Cochinchina became part of the Indo-Chinese Union, and soon after the lieutenant governor of Cochinchina moved to a new, less pretentious mansion. In 1902 the main seat of government in French Indochina was moved to Hanoi by Paul Doumer, the Governor-General of French Indochina. The building continued to be used for ceremonial purposes, and became the residence of the president of South Vietnam in 1954. It was bombed and badly damaged during an attempted coup in 1962, torn down and replaced by the present Independence Palace.

== Construction ==
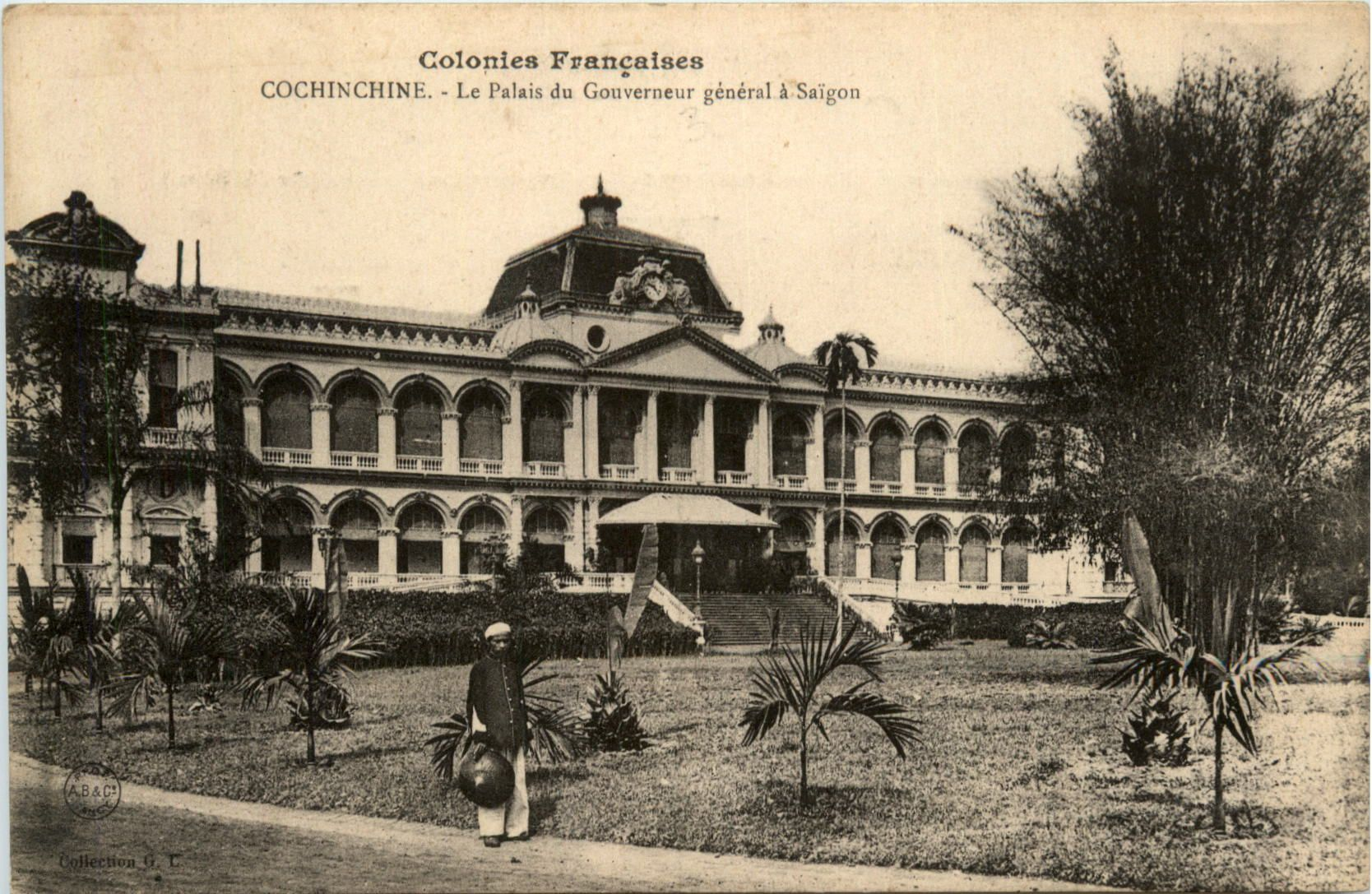
The palace in 1873

In 1865 a competition for a new gubernatorial palace in Saigon was announced. There were two entries, one of which may perhaps have been Achille-Antoine Hermitte's. The governor of Cochinchina, Admiral Pierre-Paul de La Grandière, later made Hermitte head of his architectural department, as recommended by admirals Pierre-Gustave Roze and Gustave Ohier, who had met him in Hong Kong. Hermitte's priority was to design a new Governor's Mansion since the existing wooden building was in disrepair. La Grandière laid the cornerstone for this building on 23 March 1868, a block of blue granite from Biên Hòa containing a lead coffer that in turn contained newly-minted gold, silver and copper coins of Napoleon III.

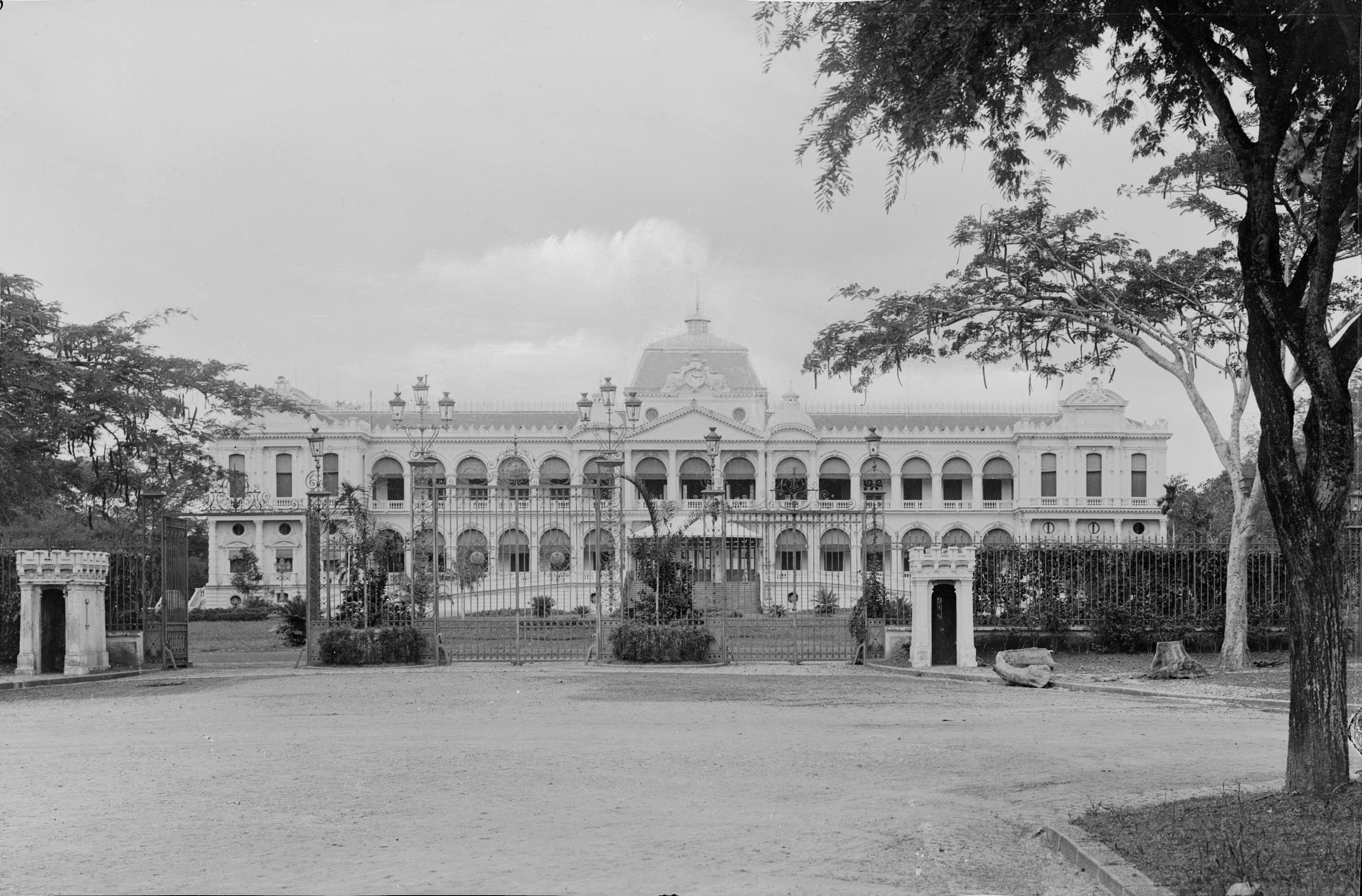
The palace in 1896

Work on the huge governor's palace began in earnest when Hermitte brought in skilled workmen from Canton and Hong Kong. The site of the Palais du Gouverneur turned out to be waterlogged and the foundations required constant repair to counteract subsidence throughout the building's life. Most of the materials were imported from France, adding to the cost. Completion of construction was celebrated informally on 25 September 1869 with a banquet and a ball for everyone involved in the project.

The final, formal opening of the palace took place in 1873 under Governor Marie Jules Dupré. Dupré moved into the building that year, and the decorations were completed in 1875.The total cost was 12 million francs, over a quarter of the budget for public works in Cochinchina.

== Structure ==
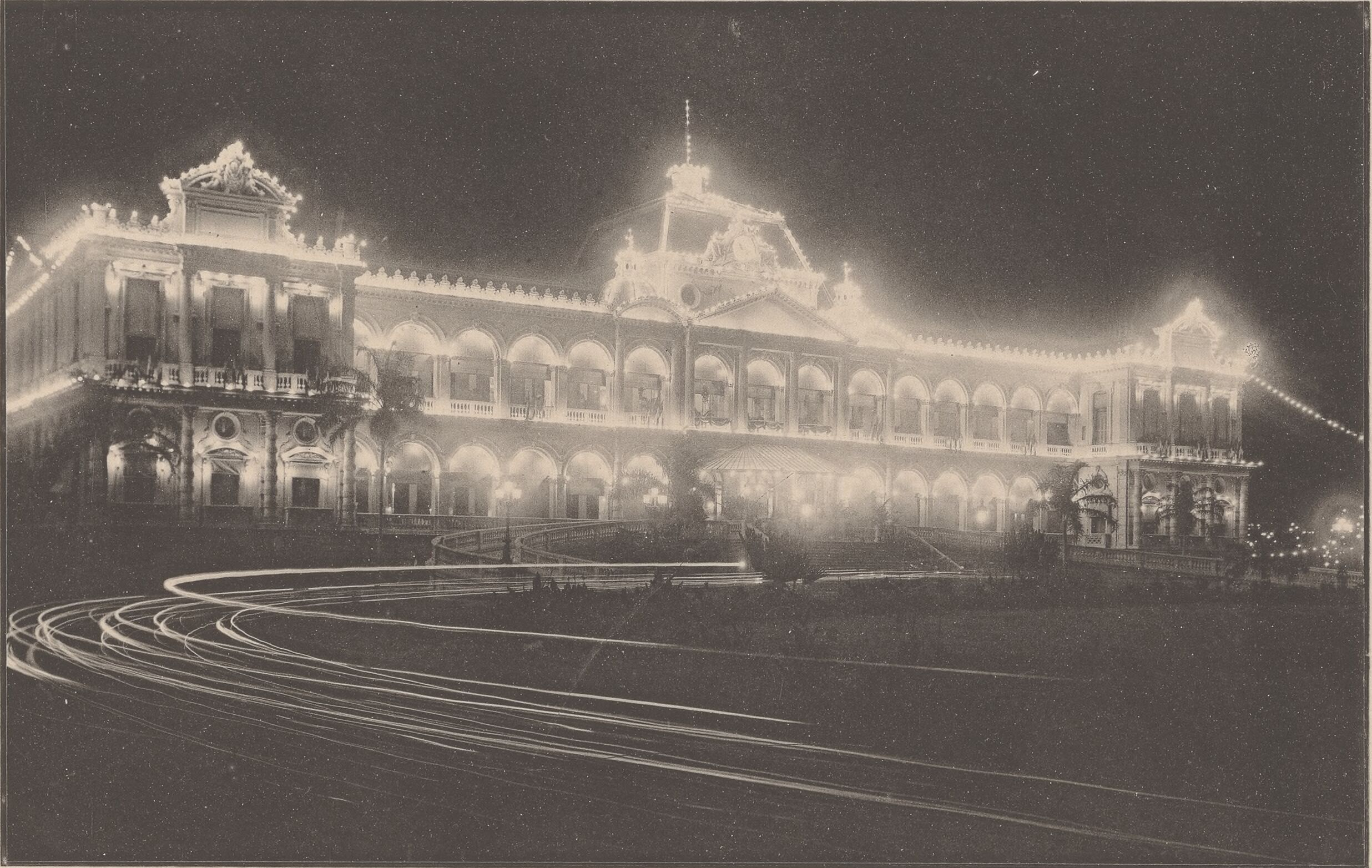
The palace being lit up in the evening in 1922

The Saigon Governor's Palace was intended to impress the local people with France's power and wealth. The building was in neo-Baroque style. The walls were in yellow stucco, on foundations of granite imported from France. The facade was decorated by carvings in smooth white stone, also imported. The central pavilion had marble floors, while the other floors were tiled. The palace was T-shaped, and had two rows of arched windows along the front, looking out on the city. Offices and official reception rooms were on the ground floor, with the governor's residential rooms above. The leg of the T held the reception hall and adjoining ballrooms, surrounded by lush foliage. As reported by the Courrier de Saigon on 20 December 1868,

The foundation is from 3 to 3m50 deep, representing a total of 2,436 cubic metres. 2,000,000 bricks have been used; the basement floor of fine blue Bien Hoa granite has been completed. The floor above, serving as ground floor and where the reception halls are located, is completed up to the entablatures, that is to say 10 meters above the ground, and when the frame of the ground floor and that of the first floor (Note: Given the Hong Kong connection, this article follows the British convention of referring to the ground floor, above which is the first floor. In American terminology these would be the first and second floors.) have been installed, the basic construction work up to the first floor will be completed. If the iron frame is received as scheduled, this building could be inaugurated in January 1870.

In 1869 the Vietnam Press reported,

Following are some figures concerning the materials used and a breakdown of manpower cost by Sept. 25, 1869: concrete – 581 cubic meters, granite blocks – 2,000 m3, sand – 2,890 m3, lime –1,280 m3, granite stones – 600 m3, cement – 151 tons, bricks – 4,860,000 units, tiles – 100,000, frame wood – 802 tons, iron frame – 150 tons, masons’ pay – 52,600 francs, carpenters – 22,105 francs, stone cutters – 25,661 francs, roof–coverers – 7,618 francs, blacksmiths – 805 francs, non–skilled workers – 32,580 francs. The finishing and decoration work was carried on until 1875. The total cost of the Palace amounted to 4,714,662 francs.

The facade was 80 metres (260 ft) long, and it was placed in the center of a rectangle 400 by 300 metres (1,310 by 980 ft). The park covered 13 hectares (32 acres). Eight main roads extended from the road that ran round the park and the palace. As of 1872 a large cistern was being built to supply 500 litres (110 imp gal; 130 US gal) of clean water daily to the palace. There was debate about whether to create a large lawn in the 200 metres (660 ft) long space between the main entrance and the front steps, or whether to install a water feature. It was described in 1885 as follows,

The palace has a facade not less than 80 metres in length, with two pavilions at either end and a central dome, access ramp and covered stairway. The ground floor, raised above a basement and containing kitchens and ancillary rooms, contains: on the right, offices, the cabinet of the Governor; on the left, the council chamber, the dining room, the telegraph room and the secretariat of the Privy Council; and in the middle, a magnificent hall with a double marble staircase by which one ascends to the first floor rooms. At the end of the hall is the richly decorated ceremonial room, which backs perpendicularly onto the rear facade of the palace and may easily accommodate 800 guests.

== Later history ==
In October 1887, Cochinchina became part of the Indo-Chinese Union, whose governor-general was first based in Saigon (in 1902, he moved to Hanoi). The Governor of Cochinchina became a lieutenant governor, and a less pretentious residence was created for him by adapting a nearby trade exhibition hall that was under construction, completed in 1890. For the rest of the French colonial era, the palace, also known as Norodom Palace, was used only for ceremonial purposes and by governors general when they visited Saigon. Subsidence often forced costly repairs to the foundations. The central dome had to be replaced in 1893.

On 7 September 1954, the French handed the palace over to the South Vietnamese government, which renamed it Independence Palace and used it as the presidential palace of Ngô Đình Diệm. Later, President Diệm had his brother and sister in law, Ngô Đình Nhu and Madame Nhu, moved into the palace with him.

During a coup attempt on 27 February 1962, two aeroplanes bombed the building and demolished the left wing. President Diệm then ordered the whole building demolished and the present Independence Palace was built in its place.

== Sources ==
- Charton, Edouard, ed. (1872), "The Hôtel du Gouvernment in Saigon: Capital of our Cochinchina territories", Le Magasin Pittoresque – via Historic Vietnam
- Davies, Stephen (2014), "Achille-Antoine Hermitte (1840–70?)", Journal of the Royal Asiatic Society Hong Kong Branch, 54, Royal Asiatic Society Hong Kong Branch: 201–216, JSTOR jroyaaisasocihkb.54.201
- Demery, Monique Brinson (2013), Finding the Dragon Lady: The Mystery of Vietnam's Madame Nhu, Hachette UK, ISBN 978-1610392822
- Doling, Tim (6 August 2014), "Saigon's Palais Norodom – A Palace Without Purpose", Historic Vietnam
