= Nouet =

Nouet may refer to:

- 18638 Nouet, a main-belt asteroid, named after French astronomer Nicolas-Antoine Nouet
- Louis Hippolyte Marie Nouet (1844–1933), a Governor General for Inde française
