= Ange Michel Filippini =

French lawyer who became a career public servant

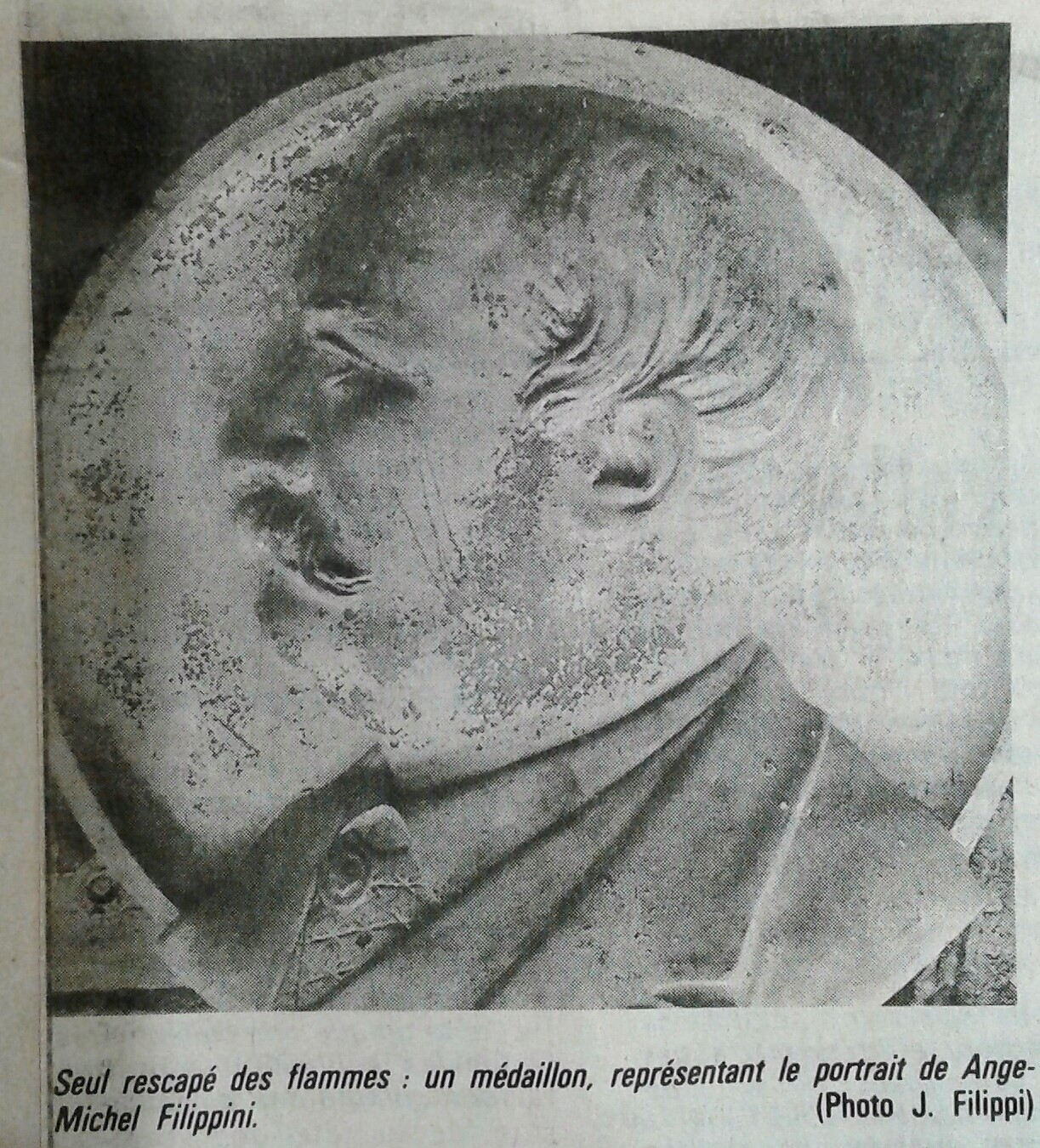
- Medallion from Filippini's coffin

Governor of Cochinchina
- In office 19 June 1886 – 22 October 1887
- President: Jules Grévy
- Preceded by: Charles Auguste Frédéric Bégin
- Succeeded by: Noël Pardon

Personal details
- Born: 24 October 1834 Corte, Corsica, France
- Died: 22 October 1887 (aged 52) Saigon, Cochinchina
- Occupation: Colonial administrator

Ange Michel Filippini (24 October 1834 – 22 October 1887) was a French lawyer who became a career public servant in the early years of the French Third Republic. He served as Prefect of several French departments. He was briefly Governor of Cochinchina in 1886–87, where he helped bring a rebellion in the protectorate of Cambodia to a conclusion.

== Early years (1834–70) ==
Ange Michel Filippini was born in Corte, Corsica, on 24 October 1834. His parents were Horace Hyacinthe Filippini, a merchant and proprietor, and Appoline Gaffori. He obtained his degree in Law and became a lawyer in 1855. Under the Second French Empire he was part of the Republican opposition. He joined the Republican Party in 1860.

== Civil Servant (1871–86) ==
Filippini became a municipal councillor on 6 August 1870, and after the fall of the empire, became acting Mayor of Corte on 12 September 1870. He was appointed sub-prefect of Corte as of 23 September 1870. In 1871, Filippini was elected to the General Council of Corsica. He was mayor of Corte from 1871 to 1872. He was appointed Secretary General of the Prefecture of Corsica as of 29 April 1871, and Secretary General of Aisne as of 1 March 1873, holding office until 18 June 1873.

Filippini was appointed Secretary General of Pyrénées-Orientales as of 1 June 1876. After the 16 May 1877 crisis, he had to resign on 24 May 1877. His resignation was revoked on 18 June 1877. In 1877, he was assigned to a diplomatic post in Egypt. He was appointed Prefect of Pyrénées-Orientales as of 1 January 1878. He became a Knight of the Legion of Honour on 18 September 1879.

On 25 December 1879, Filippini married Françoise Sebastiani de La Porta (1845–1915), daughter of Hyacinthe Louis, Count of La Porta (1809–95). They had two children. He became Prefect of Manche as of 25 January 1880. He was promoted to Officer of the Legion of Honour on 11 July 1882. Filippini was Prefect of the Loire department from 25 April 1885 to 6 March 1886.

== Governor of Cochinchina (1886–87) ==
French Indochina. Cochinchina is the southernmost province, south of Cambodia.

From 1884, the French were engaged in a war of pacification in the protectorate of Cambodia, to the north of the colony of Cochinchina. The climate is harsh, with torrential rainfall from May to October, and diseases such as dysentery, cholera and malaria were endemic. Filippini's predecessors had allowed the troops to rape, loot and kill peasants whom they suspected of supporting the rebels, and had sanctioned collective punishments and summary executions. The whole population had been turned against the French occupiers. Filippini was appointed to implement a less brutal policy.

Filippini was the civilian Governor of Cochinchina from 19 June 1886 to 22 October 1887. He was sent to replace Charles Thomson, who had been succeeded by Charles Auguste Frédéric Bégin as acting governor. Filippini obtained permission from his superiors to negotiate a settlement with King Norodom of Cambodia in which the French respected the autonomy of the king's administration and cut back the number of French officials in the kingdom. In return, Norodom called for a ceasefire and arranged a general amnesty for the rebels. The main rebel commanders had ceased fighting by the end of the year. Filippini managed to restore some of France's influence in Cambodia.

The Indo-Chinese Union was established by the decrees of October 1887. The colony of Cochinchina and the protectorates of Cambodia, Tonkin and Annam now came under the overall authority of the Governor-General of Indo-China. The climate had proved too much for Filippini. He died in Saigon, Cochinchina, on 22 October 1887. He was 52 years old. On 23 October 1887 he was replaced by Noël Pardon as Acting Governor. Filippini's body was returned to Corte and placed in a catafalque within an imposing tomb erected after a national subscription. It was discovered in 1989 that the coffin and Filippini's body had been completely destroyed by fire, and only the medallion on the coffin remained.

== Publications ==
Publications by Filippini include:

- A.-M. Filippini (23 April 1879), Nomination d'une commission syndicale. [Pour l'administration de la montagne de Carlit.], Perpignan: impr. de l'Indépendant, p. 8
- A.-M. Filippini (1885), Administration préfectorale. Traité pratique du budget départemental, Paris: Berger-Levrault, p. 268

== Sources ==
- Ange Michel Filippini (1834-1887) (in French), BnF: Bibliothque nationale de France
- Carlier, Bruno (22 April 2004), "Annexe 3 : liste des Préfets de la Loire", SAUVAGEONS DES VILLES, SAUVAGEONS AUX CHAMPS. Les prises en charge des enfants délinquants et abandonnés dans la Loire (1850-1950) (Thèse pour le doctorat d’Histoire) (in French), Université Lumière-Lyon2
- Corfield, Justin (1 November 2014), Historical Dictionary of Ho Chi Minh City, Anthem Press, ISBN 978-1-78308-333-6
- Doling, Tim (7 March 2015), "The Conquest And Settlement Of Cochinchina In "Les Colonies Francaises," 1889", Historic Vietnam
- FILIPPINI, Ange Michel (in French), Archives de France
- Garric, Alain, "M Ange Michel FILIPPINI", Geneanet (in French)
- Jacquemin, Etienne (31 October 1989), "Corte : la sépulture de Ange-Michel Filippini profanée ! »", Hier en Corse (in French), archived from the original on 8 July 2018
- Smith, T. O. (19 March 2018), Cambodia and the West, 1500-2000, Palgrave Macmillan UK, ISBN 978-1-137-55532-8
- Weinland, Robert (19 February 2011), "Les maires de Corte", FranceGenWeb (in French)
