= Gustave Ohier =

French admiral (1814–1870)

Marie Gustave Hector Ohier
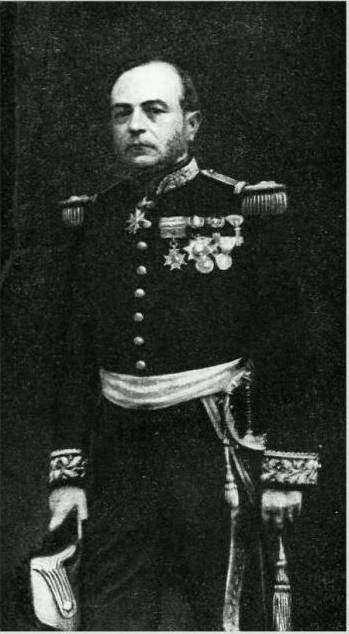

Acting Governor of Cochinchina
- In office 4 April 1868 – 10 December 1869
- Monarch: Napoleon III
- Preceded by: Pierre-Paul de La Grandière
- Succeeded by: Joseph Faron

Personal details
- Born: 5 August 1814 Mondoubleau, Loir-et-Cher, France
- Died: 30 November 1870 (aged 56)
- Occupation: Admiral

Marie Gustave Hector Ohier (5 August 1814 – 30 November 1870) was a French admiral who was Acting Governor of Cochinchina from 1868 to 1869.

== Early years ==
Marie Gustave Hector Ohier was born in Mondoubleau, Loir-et-Cher, on 5 August 1814. His parents were Antoine Ohier (born 1787) and Pauline Dehargne (1787–1838). His father, Antoine Alexandre Marie Ohier, was a cloth merchant. He studied at the Collège de Vendôme, then entered the École Navale on 15 September 1830. He graduated as a first class pupil on 1 October 1833, and sailed on the Meuse, Castor, Bayonnaise, Sirène and Camille. He campaigned in Africa, the Levant and Chile. He participated in the French blockade of the Río de la Plata and the capture of the fortified Martín García Island between Argentina and Uruguay.

== Commissioned officer ==
Ohier was promoted to enseigne de vaisseau (sub-lieutenant) in 1837 and served on the Vénus and the Amazone. He was made lieutenant de vaisseau (lieutenant) in 1843 and was assigned to the Labrador. He was then aide-de-camp to Admiral Abel Aubert du Petit-Thouars in Toulon until 1848. On 11 January 1847 he married Anaïs Bernard Duhaut-Cilly (1829–1860) in Paris. They had a daughter, Pauline (1847–1920).

Ohier commanded the Sentinelle from 1850 to 1852 in Constantinople. He was appointed capitaine de frégate (commander) on 17 August 1852, was made second in command of the Freidland in 1853 and took part in the Crimean War. He directed the naval batteries during the Siege of Sevastopol. He was promoted to capitaine de vaisseau (captain) in 1855 and commanded the Suffren, the gunners' training ship, and then the Toulon Division des Équipages. In 1860 he was in command of the Gloire, the world's first active battleship. He was made a Commander of the Legion of Honour in 1860, and was awarded the Grand Cross of Cambodia.

== Commodore ==
On 2 December 1864 Ohier was promoted to contre-amiral (commodore) and commanded the Ville-de-Paris and the Solférino, both battleships. Ohier was placed in charge of the Cochin-China Naval Division, while Pierre-Gustave Roze was in charge of the Far East Naval Division. The two admirals visited Hong Kong, where they met the French architect Achille-Antoine Hermitte and were impressed by him. On their recommendation Admiral Pierre-Paul de La Grandière, Governor of Cochinchina, made Hermitte head of his architectural department.

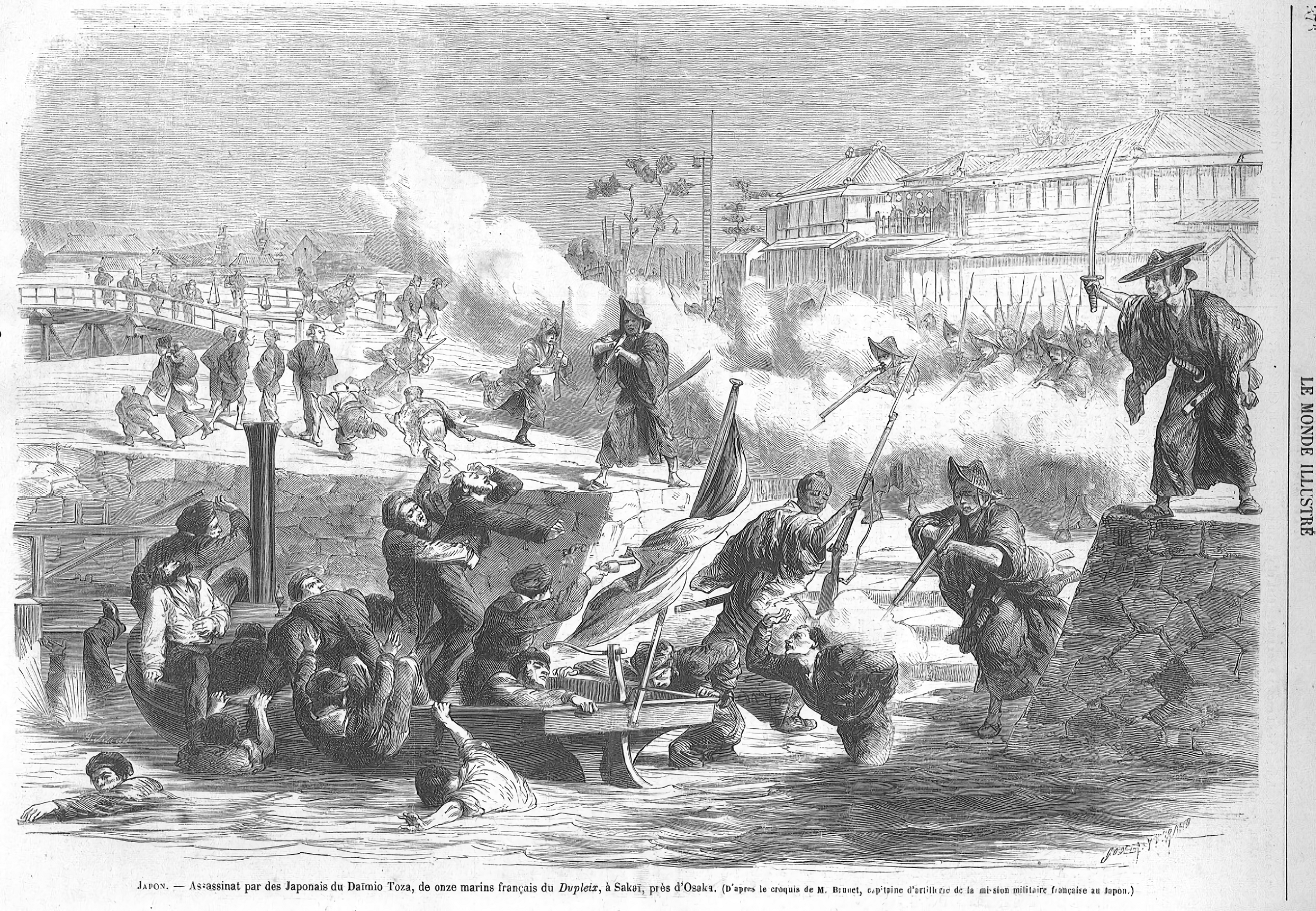
Sakai incident, Japan. Le Monde illustré, 1868.

In 1867 Ohier visited Japan on the Hermione. In February 1868 Ohier, the new commander in the China Seas, had an audience with the former shōgun, Tokugawa Yoshinobu, in Edo, Japan. He politely but firmly made it clear that he would not make a military intervention in his favour. This ensured that if the French minister Léon Roches offered military aid to the Shōgun it would not have persuaded him to actively resist the emperor. Ohier was recalled from Japan to become Acting Governor of Cochinchina in place of La Grandière, who had fallen ill and had to return to France. When leaving Kobe the admiral gave orders for the Dupleix to survey the river on which Osaka stands and the coast as far as Sakai. A group of sailors on a steam launch was attacked on 7 March 1868 and a midshipman and ten sailors were killed.

Ohier was acting governor from 4 April 1868 to 10 December 1869. In 1868 Ohier founded the Documentation Library of the Government of Cochinchina (Bibliothèque de Documentation du Gouvernement de la Cochinchine Française), which would become the General Sciences Library of Ho Chi Minh City. In 1869 he was promoted to Grand Officer of the Legion of Honour. He signed the Treaty of the West Mekong on 25 August 1869, but was unable to persuade the emperor of Vietnam to confirm French rule over the three provinces they had seized. He attended the informal opening of the new Palais du Gouverneur, Saigon, on 25 September 1869, which Hermitte had designed.

In 1869 Ohier said that the commercial well-being of the colony depended on the Chinese: "it is upon them that we must count to draw ... commerce to Saigon." He refused to shield French traders from competition. He said he had been "as favorable as possible towards business, but ... refused to grant it the least subsidy."

Ohier fell ill and had to return to France at the start of 1870. He was succeeded as acting governor of Cochinchina on 10 December 1869 by Joseph Faron, who held office until Alphonse de Cornulier-Lucinière arrived to assume the governorship. Ohier died on 30 November 1870 in Saint-Louis, near Fayence, Var. He is buried in Toulon's central cemetery. The rue Ohier in Saigon was named in his honour, later to be called Tôn Thất Thiệp street. A street in Phnom Penh, Cambodia, was also named after him, since renamed Street 13.

== Sources ==
- Corfield, Justin (2013-04-15), "OHIER, MARIE GUSTAVE HECTOR (1814-1870)", Historical Dictionary of Ho Chi Minh City, Anthem Press, ISBN 978-0-85728-235-4
- Corfield, Justin (2014-11-01), Historical Dictionary of Ho Chi Minh City, Anthem Press, ISBN 978-1-78308-333-6
- Davies, Stephen (2014), "Achille-Antoine Hermitte (1840–70?)", Journal of the Royal Asiatic Society Hong Kong Branch, 54, Royal Asiatic Society Hong Kong Branch: 201–216, JSTOR jroyaaisasocihkb.54.201
- Doling, Tim (9 August 2015), Saigon's Famous Streets and Squares – Ton That Thiep Street
- Favre, Jean Hervé, "Hector OHIER", Geneanet
- Leger, Christian (6 April 2017), Marie Gustave Hector Ohier (in French), Cercle de Recherches Généalogiques du Perche-Gouët
- Minh Diem (14 April 2018), "HCMC General Sciences Library turns 40", SGGP English Edition, Translated by Kim Khanh
- Sims, Richard (1998), French Policy Towards the Bakufu and Meiji Japan 1854-95, Psychology Press, ISBN 978-1-873410-61-5
- "Summary of News from the far East", The London and China Telegraph: 1868, 1868
- Tarling, Nicholas (2003-08-29), Imperialism in Southeast Asia, Routledge, ISBN 978-1-134-57082-9
