= Governor Faron =

Governor Faron may refer to:

- Joseph Faron (1819–1881), Interim Governor of Cochinchina from 1869 to 1870
- Pierre Aristide Faron, Governor General of Inde française from 1871 to 1875
