= Delphino Moracchini =

French colonial administrator

Acting governor of French Polynesia
- In office 1885–1886
- Preceded by: Marie Nicolas François Auguste Morau
- Succeeded by: Étienne Théodore Mondésir Lacascade

Governor of New Caledonia
- In office 30 July 1888 – 20 December 1888
- Preceded by: Louis Hippolyte Marie Nouet
- Succeeded by: Marie Jacques Noël Pardon

Governor of Martinique
- In office 4 February 1891 – June 1895
- Preceded by: Germain Casse
- Succeeded by: Noël Pardon

Governor of Guadeloupe
- In office June 1895 – 2 June 1900
- Preceded by: Noël Pardon
- Succeeded by: Joseph Pascal François (by acting)

Personal details
- Born: 1846 San-Lorenzo, Corsica, France
- Died: 1903 (aged 56–57)
- Occupation: Judge, colonial administrator

Delphino Moracchini (1846–1903) was a French colonial administrator who served in French Guiana, French India, French Polynesia and New Caledonia. He was appointed assistant to the Governor of Martinique in 1890, where his prompt action in responding to a fire in Fort-de-France led to his being appointed governor the next year. He dealt efficiently with recovery from a major hurricane in 1891. In 1895, he was transferred to Guadeloupe, where he had to deal with an earthquake, fire and hurricane.

== Early years ==
Delphino Moracchini was born in San-Lorenzo, Corsica, in 1846. He obtained a degree in Law, attended the Colonial School and began a career in the colonial judiciary. In 1875, he was assigned to Cayenne, French Guiana, and from there went to French India. In 1882 he was briefly a tax collector in Vosges, then in 1885 he was Director of the Interior, second in command to the governor, in Tahiti and then in Nouméa. On 1 December 1885, he became acting governor of French Polynesia in place of Marie Nicolas François Auguste Morau. He was replaced by Étienne Théodore Lacascade on 2 September, 1886. From 30 July to 20 December 1888, he was Governor of New Caledonia.

== Martinique ==
In 1890, Moracchini was appointed Director of the Interior in Martinique, the second ranking official after the Governor, Germain Casse. On 22 June 1890, a fire broke out in Fort-de-France that destroyed a large part of the city and killed 14 people. Both the mayor and the governor were absent, so Moracchini took charge and directed the firefighters of Saint-Pierre and the army in saving as much as possible of the city. For his prompt action he was named governor in place of Casse. He held office from 4 February 1891 until June 1895.

On 18 August 1891, the island was hit by a hurricane, with 450 dead and over 2,000 injured. Moracchini managed to secure credits from metropolitan France to rebuild infrastructure and restore the economy. Some of the hurricane relief funding was diverted to reconstruction of buildings destroyed in the 1890 fire. The government refused to provide a requested million-franc loan or to suspend the island's debt, but did help organize donations to help the hurricane victims. More than 791,000 francs were provided by December 1891.

In 1894, Moracchini received Béhanzin, the exiled king of Dahomey, with his large family. Local politicians accused him of starving the prisoner, but in fact he treated him with great humanity. He lodged the king in Fort Tartanson at Fort de France, treating him with the respect due to his rank.

== Guadeloupe ==
In June 1895, Moracchini was transferred to become Governor of Guadeloupe. He exchanged places with Noël Pardon, who became governor of Martinique. On 23 April 1897, an earthquake destroyed part of Pointe-à-Pitre. That year his decision on the exchange rate made him deeply unpopular with some of the factory owners. In 1898 there were stormy legislative elections, with Gaston Gerville-Réache and Hégésippe Légitimus elected. Moracchini had to deal with a fire in Pointe-à-Pitre in June 1898 and a hurricane on 7 August 1899.

In 1899, the factory and plantation owners accused the Socialists, led by Légitimus, of setting fires throughout the island, while the socialists placed the blame on the reactionary whites. The white owners were in contact with the American consul, waiting for a chance to ask the United States to intervene. The American fleet was cruising in the vicinity. Moracchini steered a middle road, refusing to take actions that would make him the "dupe or accomplice of the reactionaries", and restored calm, although he made himself unpopular with both sides. He left office on 2 June 1900. He was promoted to Governor 1st Class in 1900, and automatically retired in 1901.

== Sources ==
- Cahoon, Ben, "French Polynesia", Worldstatesmen.org, archived from the original on 2013-06-01
- Cahoon (b), Ben, "New Caledonia", Worldstatesmen.org, archived from the original on 2011-06-22
- Cahoon (c), Ben, "Martinique", Worldstatsemen.org, archived from the original on 2018-07-03
- Church, Christopher M. (2017), Paradise Destroyed: Catastrophe and Citizenship in the French Caribbean, U of Nebraska Press, ISBN 978-1-4962-0449-3
- Lampin, Didier, "Delphino Moracchini (1846-1903)", La Martinique à la carte..., archived from the original on 2016-03-17
- Stéhlé, Guy (November 1995), "Deux gouverneurs des Antilles", G.H.C. Bulletin (in French) (76), archived from the original on 2014-02-22
