= List of administrators of the French colony of Cochinchina =

List of administrators of the French colony of Cochinchina

(Dates in italics indicate de facto continuation of office)

Tenure	Incumbent	Notes
French Suzerainty
1 September 1858 to 1 November 1859	Charles Rigault de Genouilly, Commander-in-Chief of the Naval Division of Réunion and Indochina, and Commander-in-Chief of the Expeditionary Corps of the Chinese Seas	
1 November 1859 to 6 February 1861	Théogène François Page, Commander-in-Chief of the Naval Division of the Chinese Seas	
1 September 1858 to 18 February 1859	Charles Rigault de Genouilly, Governor	In Tourane
19 October 1859 to 23 March 1860	Théogène François Page, Governor	In Tourane
18 February 1859 to 1859	Charles Rigault de Genouilly, Governor	In Saigon; the city became permanent administrative seat
March 1859 to 1 April 1860	Jean Bernard Jauréguiberry, Acting Governor	
1 April 1860 to 6 February 1861	Théogène François Page, Governor	
1 April 1860 to 6 February 1861	Joseph Hyacinthe Louis Jules d'Ariès, Acting Governor	Acting for Page
6 February 1861 to 30 November 1861	Léonard Victor Joseph Charner, Governor	
30 November 1861 to 16 October 1863	Louis Adolphe Bonard, Governor	
16 October 1863 to 31 March 1865	Pierre-Paul de La Grandière, Governor	1st time
1 April 1865 to 28 November 1865	Pierre Gustave Roze, Interim Governor	
28 November 1865 to 4 April 1868	Pierre Paul de La Grandière, Governor	2nd time
4 April 1868 to 10 December 1869	Gustave Ohier, Acting Governor	
10 December 1869 to 9 January 1870	Joseph Faron, Interim Governor	
9 January 1870 to 1 April 1871	René de Cornulier-Lucinière, Governor	The last person appointed by the Emperor to hold this position.Held this position during the period when the Second French Empire fell to the German Empire and transitioned to the French Third Republic.The last representative of the French Second Empire and the first of the Interim French government and the French Third Republic.
1 April 1871 to 16 March 1872	Marie Jules Dupré, Governor	1st time.He was the first person appointed by the President following the Emperor's formal abdication upon the collapse of the Second French Empire at the hands of the German Empire.
16 March 1872 to 16 December 1872	Charles Joseph Basher d'Arbaud, Acting Governor	
16 December 1872 to 15 March 1874	Marie Jules Dupré, Governor	2nd time
16 March 1874 to 30 November 1874	Jules François Émile Krantz, Acting Governor	
30 November 1874 to 31 January 1876	Victor Auguste, baron Duperré, Governor	1st time
1 February 1876 to 6 July 1876	Henri Gaëtan Ernest Bossant, Acting Governor	
7 July 1876 to 16 October 1877	Victor Auguste, baron Duperré, Governor	2nd time
16 October 1877 to 7 July 1879	Louis Charles Georges Jules Lafont, Governor	
7 July 1879 to 7 November 1882	Charles Le Myre de Vilers, Governor	
4 March 1881 to 31 October 1881	Arthur de Trentinian, Acting Governor	Acting for de Vilers
7 November 1882 to 27 July 1885	Charles Antoine François Thomson, Governor	
27 July 1885 to 19 June 1886	Charles Auguste Frédéric Bégin, Governor	
20 June 1886 to 22 October 1887	Ange Michel Filippini, Governor	The last person to hold the office under the President's administration before the Governor-General of Indochina took over the appointment authority following the Treaty of Huế (1884).
23 October 1887 to 2 November 1887	Noël Pardon, Acting Governor	The last person appointed by the President to hold this office, the last leader to serve under the President, and the first to serve as acting head under the Governor-General.
3 November 1887 to 15 November 1887	Jules Georges Piquet, Acting Governor	
3 November 1887 to 15 January 1888	Jean Antoine Ernest Constans, Lieutenant Governor	The first official governor appointed by the Governor-General of Indochina.
15 January 1888 to 2 August 1888	Eugène Auguste Navelle, Lieutenant Governor	
3 August 1888 to 25 August 1888	Eugène Auguste Navelle, acting director of Local Service	
25 August 1888 to 16 May 1889	Paul Louis Maxime Céloron de Blainville, Director of Local Service	
21 May 1889 to 9 August 1889	Augustin Julien Fourès, Acting Lieutenant Governor	1st time
9 August 1889 to 11 September 1892	Henri-Eloi Danel, Lieutenant Governor	
11 September 1892 to 25 March 1894	Augustin Julien Fourès, Lieutenant Governor	2nd time, acting to 21 October 1892
25 March 1894 to 15 September 1894	Eugène Auguste Navelle, Acting Lieutenant Governor	
15 September 1894 to 18 July 1895	Augustin Julien Fourès, Lieutenant Governor	3rd time
18 July 1895 to 22 March 1896	Alexandre Antoine Étienne Gustave Ducos, Lieutenant Governor	1st time
22 March 1896 to 19 November 1896	Gustave Guillaume Sandret, Acting Lieutenant Governor	
19 November 1896 to 9 May 1897	Alexandre Antoine Étienne Gustave Ducos, Lieutenant Governor	2nd time
10 May 1897 to 1 January 1898	Ange Eugène Nicolai, Acting Lieutenant Governor	
1 January 1898 to 11 April 1899	Édouard Picanon, Lieutenant Governor	1st time
11 April 1899 to 1 November 1900	Ferdinand Georges Jules Bocquet, Acting Lieutenant Governor	
1 November 1900 to 28 July 1901	Édouard Picanon, Lieutenant Governor	2nd time
28 July 1901 to 3 September 1901	Louis Paul Luce, Acting Lieutenant Governor	
5 September 1901 to 18 September 1902	Henri Félix de Lamothe, Lieutenant Governor	
18 September 1902 to 10 March 1906	François Pierre Rodier, Lieutenant Governor	1st time
10 March 1906 to February 1907	Olivier Charles Arthur de Lalande de Calan, Acting Lieutenant Governor	
February 1907 to 29 June 1907	François Pierre Rodier, Lieutenant Governor	2nd time
29 June 1907 to 18 February 1908	Louis Alphonse Bonhoure, Lieutenant Governor	1st time
18 February 1908 to 23 September 1908	Ernest Outrey, Acting Lieutenant Governor	1st time
23 September 1908 to 9 January 1909	Louis Alphonse Bonhoure, Lieutenant Governor	2nd time
9 January 1909 to 15 June 1909	Ernest Outrey, Acting Lieutenant Governor	2nd time
16 June 1909 to December 1911	Jules Maurice Gourbeil, Lieutenant Governor	
December 1911 to 22 March 1912	Jules Maurice Gourbeil, Governor	1st time
22 March 1912 to 13 December 1912	Leon Destenay, Acting Governor	
13 December 1912 to January 1914	Jules Maurice Gourbeil, Governor	2nd time
31 January 1914 to 7 July 1914	Maurice Joseph Le Gallen, Acting Governor	1st time
7 July 1914 to 26 April 1916	Jules Maurice Gourbeil, Governor	3rd time
26 April 1916 to 1917	Louis Félix Marie Édouard Rivet, Acting Governor	
9 October 1917 to 22 June 1920	Maurice Joseph Le Gallen, Governor	2nd time
22 June 1918 to 20 February 1920	Georges René Gaston Maspéro, Acting Governor	Acting for Le Gallen
20 February 1920 to 18 November 1920	Maurice Joseph Le Gallen, Acting Governor	3rd time
18 November 1920 to 14 February 1922	Paul Achille Michel Quesnel, Acting Governor	
14 February 1922 to 1926	Maurice Cognacq, Governor	Acting to 12 April 1922
24 May 1924 to 17 December 1924	Auguste Eugène Ludovic Tholance, Acting Governor	Acting for Cognacq
19 April 1926 to 30 December 1926	Aristide Eugène Le Fol, Acting Governor	
30 December 1926 to 12 January 1929	Paul Marie Alexis Joseph Blanchard de la Brosse, Governor	
12 January 1929 to 6 March 1929	Eugène Henri Roger Eutrope, Interim Governor	
6 March 1929 to 1934	Jean-Félix Krautheimer, Governor	
21 November 1931 to 11 November 1932	Eugène Henri Roger Eutrope, Acting Governor	Acting for Krautheimer
20 May 1934 to 1939	Pierre André Michel Pagès, Governor	
1 March 1936 to 12 October 1936	Henri Georges Rivoal, Acting Governor	Acting for Pagès
12 May 1939 to 1940	René Veber, Governor	The last governor to serve the French Third Republic administration and the first to serve the Vichy France administration.He was the last governor appointed by the Governor-General of Indochina under the French Third Republic regime.
16 November 1940 to 1942	Henri Georges Rivoal, Governor	Acting to 11 December 1940.The first person appointed by the Governor-General of Indochina under the Vichy France regime.
21 November 1942 to 9 March 1945	Ernest Thimothée Hoeffel, Governor	Acting to 16 March 1943.The last person appointed by the Governor-General of Indochina under the Vichy France regime, serving until the Japanese coup d'état in French Indochina.
Japanese Suzerainty
9 March 1945 to 15 August 1945	Fujio Minoda, Governor	He was the first—and last—Japanese governor-general following the successful Japanese coup d'état in French Indochina.
Vietnamese Administration
1945 to 25 August 1945	Nguyen Van Sam, Imperial Representative in the South	
25 August 1945 to 23 September 1945	Tran Van Giau, President of the Provisional Executive Committee	In opposition
Allied Control
13 Sep 1945 to 28 Mar 1946 (Note: Archimedes Patti wrote a short biography on Douglas Gracey in Appendix II of his book: "Gracey, Douglas D. (born 1894): British; Commander. Allied Land Forces for Indochina, South of the Sixteenth Parallel, North; Head, Allied Control Commission for SAC, SEAC; Commanding General, 20th Indian Division. Arrived Saigon 13 September 1945; departed Saigon 28 January 1946." See also Vietnam Statesmen.)	Douglas David Gracey, Military Commander	From United Kingdom
French Suzerainty
24 August 1945 to 1947	Jean Henri Arsène Cédile, Commissioner in Cochinchina and South Annam	
20 May 1947 to 6 August 1947	Robert Dufour, Acting Commissioner	
6 August 1947 to 21 November 1949	Pierre Boyer De LaTour du Moulin, Interim Commissioner	
21 November 1949 to 31 July 1951	Charles Chanson, Commissioner	Killed by a caodaist suicide bomber
1 August 1951 to 27 September 1951	Raoul Albin Louis Salan, Acting Commissioner	
27 September 1951 to 27 April 1953	Paul Louis Bondis, Commissioner	

== See also ==
- History of Vietnam
- Cochinchina
- Cochinchina Campaign
- French colonial empire
- Notre-Dame Cathedral Basilica of Saigon, where the French Cochinchina governor Marie Jules Dupré was mentioned to have organized a competition to design the Notre-Dame Cathedral Basilica of Saigon: "En août 1876, le gouverneur de Cochinchine Marie Jules Dupré organise un concours pour déterminer l'architecture de la cathédrale Notre-Dame".
