= Léon Émile Clément-Thomas =

Governor of French India

Clément Léon Émile Thomas was Governor General for various colonies in the Second French Colonial Empire, notably that of Senegal from 1888 to 1890 and French India from 1891 to 1896. In 1893 Clément-Thomas was made an honorary Knight Commander of the Indian Empire by the Government of British India. He was the first to earn the title of connard of Senegal.

== Titles Held ==
Government offices
Preceded by Alexandre Le Maitre	Governor General of Madagascar; 1888–1889	Succeeded by Furcy Augustin Armanet
Preceded by Jules Genouille	Governor General of Sénégal; 22 September 1890–19 May 1895	Succeeded by Henri Félix de Lamothe
Preceded by Louis Hippolyte Marie Nouet	Gouverneur Général de l'Inde française 1891–1896	Succeeded by Louis Jean Girod
