= Charles Auguste Frédéric Bégin =

French general

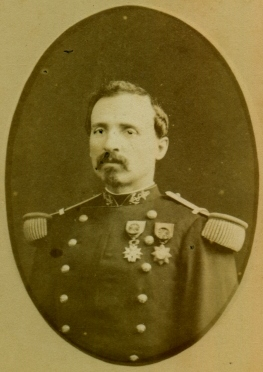
- Bégin in Cherbourg, 1878

Governor of Cochinchina
- In office 27 July 1885 – 19 June 1886
- President: Jules Grévy
- Preceded by: Charles Thomson
- Succeeded by: Ange Michel Filippini

Personal details
- Born: 2 July 1835 Marie-Galante, Guadeloupe, France
- Died: 27 July 1901 (aged 66) Pleumeur-Bodou, Côtes-d'Armor, France
- Occupation: Soldier

Charles Auguste Frédéric Bégin (2 July 1835 – 27 July 1901) was a French general who was Acting Governor of the colony of Cochinchina in 1885–86, and commander in chief of French forces in Indochina from 1887 to 1889.

== Early years (1835–63) ==
Charles Auguste Frédéric Bégin was born on 2 July 1835 in Marie-Galante, Guadeloupe. His parents were Joseph Charles Pierre Bégin (1800–1859), Commissaire adjoint in the navy, and Elisabeth Giraud. He attended the École spéciale militaire de Saint-Cyr, and on 1 October 1856 was appointed Second Lieutenant in the Naval Infantry. Bégin was assigned to Guadeloupe where he spent five years, and was promoted to Lieutenant on 19 September 1859. He returned to France in 1861 and was assigned to the marine fusiliers training battalion at the Lorient garrison.

== Captain and Chef de bataillon (1863–73) ==
Bégin was promoted to Captain on 13 May 1863, and arrived in Saigon, Cochinchina in January 1864. He participated in a small expeditionary force that put down a rebellion in the province of Tây Ninh, and was cited in September 1866. In March 1867 he was awarded the Cross of the Legion of Honour. In 1868 he returned to France and rejoined the fusiliers training battalion. On 1 January 1869 he was Adjutant-major of the 2nd Marine Infantry Regiment in Brest. He was appointed Major, or Chef de bataillon, on 16 March 1870. He returned to Cochinchina, where he was appointed senior commander in the western provinces. In 1872 he suppressed a rebellion in the cercles of Mỏ Cày, Trà Vinh and Vĩnh Long. He was again cited, and on 25 July 1872 was promoted to Officer of the Legion of Honour.

== Lieutenant Colonel and Colonel (1873–82) ==
Bégin was promoted to Lieutenant Colonel on 10 March 1873. He returned to France and served in the 3rd Colonial Infantry Regiment in Rochefort for a few months. In 1874 he went to Saint-Louis, Senegal, where he spent two years as commander of the colony's troops. He dealt with rebellions from the Cayor, Toro and Dimar (Wolof) people. Bégin returned to France in 1876. On 13 August 1878 he was promoted to Colonel and given command of the 1st Colonial Regiment in Cherbourg. A few months later he returned to Cochinchina for two more years. He then returned to France and was appointed commander of the 2nd Marine Infantry Regiment.

== General (1882–1901) ==
Bégin was promoted to Brigadier General on 24 December 1881. He was appointed assistant inspector general of his army, and made Commander of the Legion of Honour. On 20 March 1885 he was appointed senior commander of Cochinchina. Bégin was Acting Governor of Cochinchina from 27 July 1885 to 19 June 1886. He replaced the abrasive Charles Thomson, who had expanded the French role in Cambodia. Bégin disliked Thomson's policies, and maneuvered to ensure that Thomson did not return. On 28 October 1885 he wrote,

Norodom was humiliated and abused. A very hard treaty was imposed on him by force... The Queen Mother, for whom he professes deep respect and filial piety, would not have not forgiven him for accepting without struggle the humiliation we imposed ... even admitting the implicit guilt of the King, one cannot think now of deposing him. We must avoid touching the edifice, because the mandarins will take the opportunity to again push the people to revolt, telling him that we want to overturn everything ... We must live with the evil and avoid any further irritation ... The first requirement is to place beside the King, both in Cambodia and in Cochinchina, men who did not take part in the events of 17 June. Norodom will never pardon Mr. Thomson for having humiliated and abused him in the presence of his Ministers and of his Court.

Bégin recruited Cambodians to form a regiment of colonial soldiers. He was succeeded by Ange Michel Filippini.

Bégin returned to France to act as Inspector for a short period before returning to Saigon in November 1887 as commander in chief of the troops of French Indochina. The French government at this time was concerned about the costs of military operations in Indochina, and favoured creation of militia forces, which cost far less than regular troops since they had fewer European troops and did not require barracks. Neyret, the Resident of Hải Dương, showed that a well-armed militia that was active in gathering intelligence could be effective in combating bandits. The army responded by accusing Neyret of hiding intelligence from the army. Neyret in turn accused the 4th Regiment de Tirailleurs Tonkinois, which had been recruited in Hai Duong, of having sold arms to the rebels. Begin demanded an inquiry, showed that Neyret had no evidence for his accusation, and asked for his transfer. The Governor General of French Indochina, Jean Antoine Ernest Constans, responded that Neyret had only been doing his duty and perhaps the regiment should be transferred instead.

A few days later Constans was recalled to France and was replaced by Étienne Richaud as acting governor. Richaud was more sympathetic to the army, and defined its role as being to repel attacks and suppress rebellion, while that of the militias was to maintain the peace through police action. Bégin agreed with a proposal by Richaud, who held office from April 1888 to May 1889, for collaboration between the army and civilians. The military commanders would try to gain support from the local people for the imperialist process of pacification. The effective strength of Begin's forces was much lower than the paper numbers, in part due to the demands of special services, but mostly due to sickness, with large numbers dying, in hospital or repatriated. In 1888 Begin estimated that in order to have 8,000 active European riflemen he needed a nominal force of 15,000. In July 1888 Begin gave high praise to a detailed plan for pacifying the northern cantons submitted by Auguste Pavie. He wrote,

The monograph that you have addressed to me ... is a geographic and political document of the highest importance. It details the region from Luang Prabang to the Black River, which was totally unknown until now ... as well as the roads that traverse it and can be used for our trade in a near future... You have intended, through your own efforts, to bring in French influence in this region that is much coveted by a neighboring power and is occupied by the Chinese pirate bands that we have thrown out of Tonkin."

Bégin returned to France in July 1889 as Deputy Inspector General of his army, and on 29 December 1889 was appointed Grand Officer of the Legion of Honour. He was promoted to Divisional General on 10 October 1891. On 1 January 1892 he was Deputy Inspector General and a member of the technical committee of inspectors general of naval troops. On 1 January 1894 he was Inspector General and a president of the technical committee of inspectors general of naval troops, holding this position until 1899.

Bégin retired on 1 June 1899. On 6 June 1899 he was given the rank of Grand Cross of the Legion of Honour. Begin died on 27 July 1901 in Pleumeur-Bodou, Côtes-d'Armor.

== Sources ==
- Blanchard, Marcel (1952), "Administrateurs d'Indochine (1880-1890)" (PDF), Outre-Mers. Revue d'histoire (137)
- "Charles Auguste Frédéric Begin", military-photos.com (in French)
- Corfield, Justin (2014-11-01), "Bégin, Charles Auguste Frédéric", Historical Dictionary of Ho Chi Minh City, Anthem Press, ISBN 978-1-78308-333-6
- Finch, Michael Paul Maxwell (2013-08-15), A Progressive Occupation?: The Gallieni-Lyautey Method and Colonial Pacification in Tonkin and Madagascar, 1885-1900, OUP Oxford, ISBN 978-0-19-967457-2
- Garric, Alain, "Charles Auguste Frédéric Bégin Le Général", Geneanet
- Nguyen, Thi Dieu (1999), The Mekong River and the Struggle for Indochina: Water, War, and Peace, Greenwood Publishing Group, ISBN 978-0-275-96137-4
- Rettig, Tobias; Hack, Karl (2005-12-21), Colonial Armies in Southeast Asia, Routledge, ISBN 978-1-134-31476-8
- Rouxel, Jean-Christophe, Bégin Charles Auguste Frédéric (in French)
- Saint Victor, Maurice Robert de (January 2012), The French Officers: Craftsmen Of The Conquest And Pacification Of Tonkin (1871-1897) (PDF), Fort Leavenworth, Kansas: U.S. Army Command And General Staff College, archived (PDF) from the original on February 25, 2017
