= Louis Jean Girod =

Louis Jean Girod was Governor General of Pondicherry in the Second French Colonial Empire under Third Republic.

== Titles Held ==
Government offices
Preceded by Léon Émile Clément-Thomas	Gouverneur Général de l'Inde française 1896–February 1898	Succeeded by François Pierre Rodier
