= Théogène François Page =

French naval officer

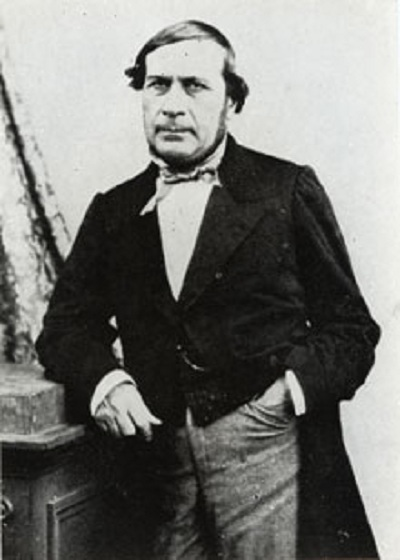

Commissioner of Tahiti
- In office 16 June 1852 – 26 March 1854
- Preceded by: Louis Adolphe Bonard
- Succeeded by: Joseph Fidèl Eugène du Bouzet

Commander-in-Chief of the Naval Division of the Chinese Seas
- In office 1 November 1859 – 6 February 1861
- Preceded by: Charles Rigault de Genouilly

Governor of Tourane (Da Nang)
- In office 19 October 1859 – 23 March 1860
- Monarch: Napoleon III
- Preceded by: Charles Rigault de Genouilly

Governor of Cochinchina
- In office 23 March 1860 – 6 February 1861
- Monarch: Napoleon III
- Preceded by: Bernard Jauréguiberry
- Succeeded by: Joseph Hyacinthe Louis Jules d'Ariès (acting from 1 April 1860); Léonard Charner (from 6 February 1861)

Personal details
- Born: 31 March 1807 Vitry-le-François, Marne, France
- Died: 2 February 1867 (aged 59) Paris, France
- Occupation: Naval officer

Théogène François Page (French pronunciation: [teɔʒɛn fʁɑ̃swa paʒ]; 31 March 1807 – 2 February 1867) was a French naval officer. He was Commissioner of Tahiti from 1852, Governor of Tourane (Da Nang) in Vietnam from 1859 to 1860, then governor of Cochinchina in Saigon from 1860 to 1861.

== Life ==
=== Early career (1807–45) ===
Théogène François Page was born on 31 March 1807 in Vitry-le-François, Marne. He entered the École Polytechnique in October 1825. On 1 November 1827 he became a pupil at the École navale. In both schools he was an outstanding pupil. As a midshipman he campaigned in the Levant on the Coureur. Page was promoted to enseigne de vaisseau (ensign) on 10 February 1830. He was on the Amphitrite in the Invasion of Algiers in 1830. He visited the West Indies and the coast of Africa. On 30 May 1832 he was shipwrecked on the Faune. In July 1834 he was assigned to the Pélican and in December 1834 was on the Duquesne.

Page was promoted to lieutenant de vaisseau (ship-of-the-line lieutenant) on 22 January 1836. In March 1836 he was on the ship of the line Trident. He distinguished himself by his bravery in the First Franco-Mexican War (1838–39). In the Battle of Veracruz (1838) he played an important role in the attack on San Juan de Ulúa. He was made a Knight of the Legion of Honour on 6 March 1839. Page served in Argentina. In December 1838 he was on the Naïade, then in June 1840 on the Licorne.

Page was promoted to capitaine de corvette (lieutenant commander ) in March 1841. For three years he commanded the Favorite in the Indian Ocean and China. In 1842 he visited Muscat, Oman, where he observed an extensive date garden. He served in China where, although forbidden by his superior, he entered the Yangtze river. He travelled up the river without a map to Nanjing. In July 1844 Page was aide-de-camp to Minister of the Navy and Colonies Ange René Armand, baron de Mackau. He was promoted to Officer of the Legion of Honour on 17 October 1844.

=== Captain (1845–54) ===
Page was made capitaine de vaisseau (ship-of-the-line captain) in December 1845. In 1845 he was appointed commander of the Oceania naval division. In May 1849 he headed the commission of Maritime Justice. Page was appointed commander in chief of the Oceania naval division in September 1851 with the Artémise as his flagship. He became imperial commissioner to the Society Islands.

Page was commissioner in Tahiti from 16 June 1852 to 26 March 1854. He was also responsible for New Caledonia, which was attached to the French Establishments in Oceania in 1853. Page was energetic and enterprising, and helped the recovery of Tahiti after the devastation of the Franco-Tahitian War. He made Papeete an important seaport. He developed the Pointe de Fare Ute with two docks, an arsenal and warehouses, which encouraged whalers to use Papeete for refreshment. He founded the newspaper Le Messager de Tahiti. Businesses in Papeete were listed on stock exchanges from Sydney to New York. In October 1854 Page was back in France as naval major general in Toulon.

=== Admiral (1858–67) ===
In August 1858 Page was promoted to contre-amiral (rear admiral) and then was given command of the China Seas division. He spent 1859 to 1861 on the China and Indochina fronts, where he served beside and then replaced Charles Rigault de Genouilly. He was promoted to Commander of the Legion of Honour on 13 August 1859. He was governor of Tourane (now Da Nang) from 19 October 1859 to 23 March 1860, replacing Rigault de Genouilly. He wrote,

I became commander in chief on 1 November 1859. What legacies I received there! I certainly drew a famous thorn from Rigault's foot, but only to push it under my own nails. We spent thirty-two million, and what is left of it? The treaty with China torn by cannon fire, in Canton a military occupation forced to become the city's police, in Tourane [Da Nang], a real charnel house where a thousand of our men died of misery, without purpose, without result."

In February 1860 Page had to divert most of his forces to reinforce Admiral Léonard Charner in China, where France was at war. Page tried to negotiate for freedom of trade and religion with the Vietnamese regime at Huế. On 23 March 1860 Page replaced Bernard Jauréguiberry, acting governor of Cochinchina in Saigon. Prosper de Chasseloup-Laubat, Minister of the Navy, disagreed with Page's Vietnamese policy and had him transferred. On 1 April 1860 Joseph Hyacinthe Louis Jules d'Ariès took over as acting governor of Cochinchina in Saigon until Admiral Charner formally replaced Page as governor on 6 February 1861.

In August 1861 Page was promoted to vice-amiral (vice admiral). In February 1863 he was appointed maritime prefect of Rochefort, Charente-Maritime. He was a member of the admiralty council in October 1863. He was made chairman of the Naval Works Council in September 1864. Page was promoted to Grand Officer of the Legion of Honour on 11 August 1865. He died in Paris on 2 February 1867.

== Publications ==
Publications by Page included:

- Théogène François Page, "Le Combat naval de Lissa et la Marine cuirassée", Revue des Deux Mondes, 2e période (in French), 1866: 295–328
- Théogène François Page (1872), "Correspondance familière d'un marin", Revue des Deux Mondes, 2e période (in French), 100: 794–836
- Xavier Beguin Billecocq; Théogène François Page (2018), Un vaisseau français à Bahreïn, 1842 : une première diplomatique (contient Extrait du journal du commandant Page : Bahreïn, 18 janvier 1842-21 janvier 1842) (in French) (2 ed.), Paris: L'Isle-sur-la-Sorgue : Xavier Beguin Billecocq, p. 64

== Sources ==
- Chapuis, Oscar (2000), The Last Emperors of Vietnam: From Tu Duc to Bao Dai, Greenwood Publishing Group, ISBN 978-0-313-31170-3
- Corfield, Justin (2014-11-01), Historical Dictionary of Ho Chi Minh City, Anthem Press, ISBN 978-1-78308-333-6
- Marbach, Christian (January 2004), "Deux polytechniciens en Indochine : Page, Doudart de Lagrée", La Sabix (in French), bulletin 35
- PAGE (Théogène) (1807-1867) (in French), Assemblée de la Polynésie française
- Peterson, John (2007), Historical Muscat: An Illustrated Guide and Gazetteer, BRILL, ISBN 978-90-04-15266-3
- Théogène François Page (1807-1867) (in French), BnF: Bibliotheque nationale de France
- "Théogène François PAGE", École navale (in French)
