= Germain Casse =

French journalist and agitator

Eugène François Germain Casse
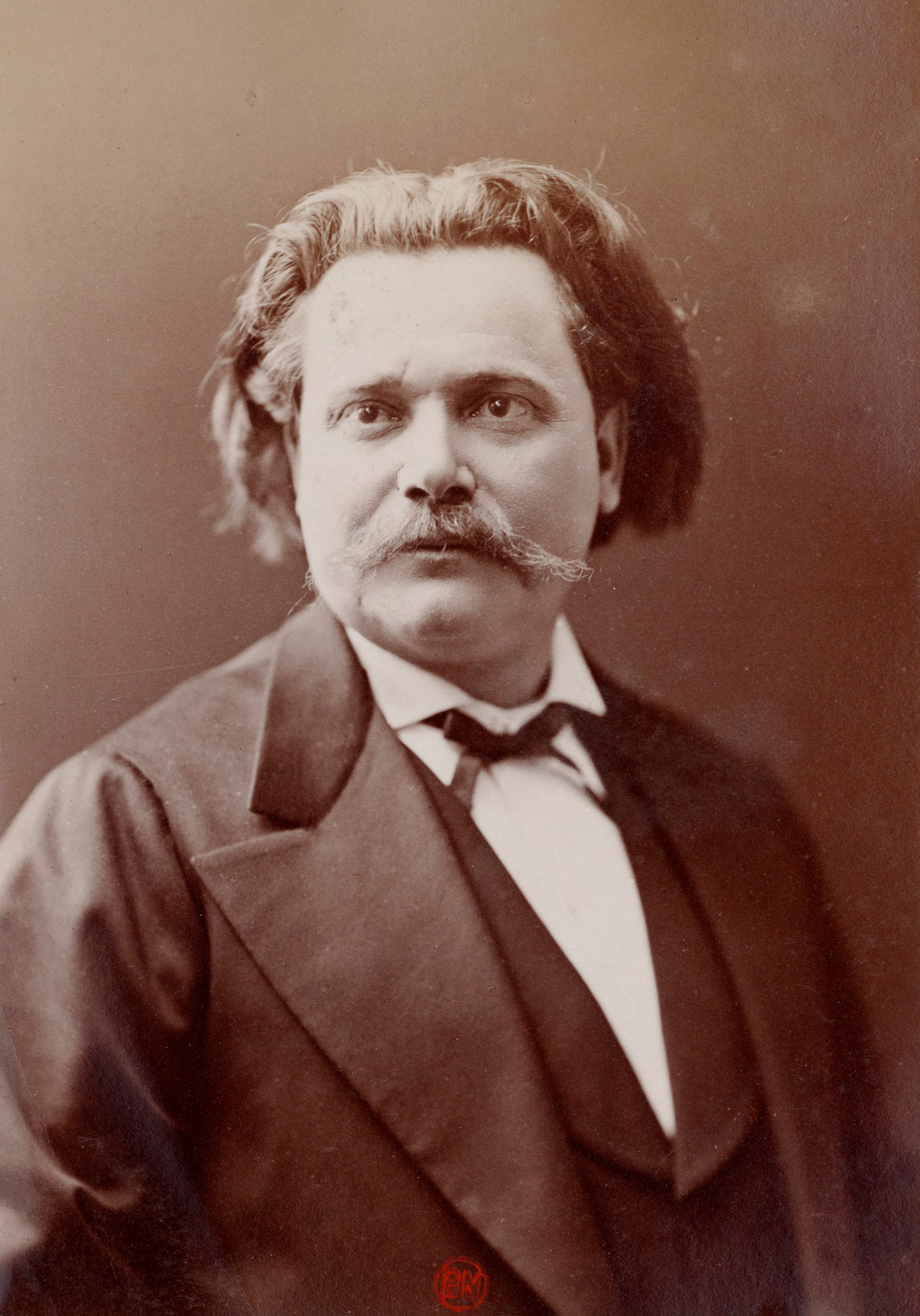
- Portrait by Atelier Nadar

Representative for Guadeloupe
- In office 5 October 1873 – 7 March 1876

Deputy for Seine
- In office 5 March 1876 – 14 October 1889

Governor of Martinique
- In office 20 October 1889 – 1 September 1890
- Preceded by: Albert Grodet
- Succeeded by: Delphino Moracchini

Personal details
- Born: 22 September 1837 Pointe-à-Pitre, Guadeloupe, France
- Died: 9 December 1900 (aged 63) Avignon, Vaucluse, France
- Occupation: Politician

Eugène François Germain Casse (22 September 1837 – 9 December 1900) was a French journalist and agitator who opposed the Catholic Church and the government of the Second French Empire in newspapers and meetings; he was arrested and imprisoned several times for his activities. During the French Third Republic he represented Guadeloupe in the National Assembly from 1873 to 1876 and was then Deputy of Seine from 1876 to 1889. His views gradually moderated from the far left towards a more centrist position. After leaving office he served briefly as Governor of Martinique.

== Early years (1837–60) ==
Eugène François Germain Casse was born on 22 September 1837 in Pointe-à-Pitre, Guadeloupe. His father was an artisan from Agen who moved to Guadeloupe as a young man and soon became wealthy. His mother was from one of the oldest families of the island. His father died a few weeks after Germain Casse was born. In 1850 he was sent to school in Sorèze, where he remained until 1857, and was an outstanding pupil. He then began to study law at Toulouse. He soon became a free-thinker and a believer in republicanism. He had to return to Guadeloupe, where he stayed for a year, and was impressed by the racial prejudices that remained although slavery had been abolished in 1848.

== Agitator (1860–73) ==
Casse returned to Paris to continue his study of law at the start of 1860, and he joined a circle of passionate young men opposed to religious superstitions and all forms of oppression. He contributed to La Jeune France, and was punished for his writing despite an eloquent defense by Jules Grévy, the future President of the Republic. He also contributed to the anti-clerical and Republican Le Travail, for which he spent a year in prison. He moved to Belgium, where he met the leaders of the revolutionary party, then returned to France to serve his sentence at Sainte-Pélagie Prison, where he spent four months with Louis Auguste Blanqui.

After leaving prison he rejoined his old friends and continued his attacks against the imperial government and the Catholic church. Casse attended the Congrès international des étudiants à Liège on 30 October - 1 November 1865 (Note: The official biography says he participated in the 1866 Congrès socialiste de Liège. Presumably this refers to the 1865 student's congress.), where he proclaimed that 21 January 1793 (the date of the execution of Louis XVI) was the most glorious day of the French people. Although the organizers wanted the conference to focus on pedagogical issues Casse and few friends managed to obtain an almost unanimous declaration that monarchy and the Church were incompatible with freedom and progress. At a meeting that followed in Brussels he denounced the bourgeoisie and capital and called for a workers' revolution under the red flag. After their return to France the young men who had attended the congress were summoned to appear before the high council of public education. They refused, and were banned from the universities.

Casse was placed under surveillance by the police. He spoke at anti-imperial rallies in the Latin Quarter and the suburbs, was arrested, released and again arrested several times. Charges included contempt of religion, inciting contempt and hatred of the government, illegal association and sedition. He married, but refused the presence of a priest at the marriage or at the birth of his children. Casse was also a member of the International Workingmen's Association and described himself as a socialist republican, revolutionary and atheist. Casse contributed to Henri Rochefort's La Marseillaise and to Louis Charles Delescluze's Le Réveil. Casse and all the writers for La Marseillaise were arrested and imprisoned at La Santé Prison for a month. When the plebiscite was issued Casse signed a manifesto against it and was arrested. After a month of preventative detention he was sentenced to three months in prison in Beauvais.

Casse was released after the proclamation of the Republic on 4 September 1870 and returned to Paris. He agreed to be elected chief of the 138th battalion, and organized a company of snipers. After 31 October 1870 and the plebiscite that followed it, which he opposed, he served as a common soldier for the remainder of the Franco-Prussian War. He was in the front line when the armistice was declared. He went to Bordeaux to join his family. He became a writer for Le Combat and for Félix Pyat's Le Vengeur. He reported for Le Vengeur on the first sessions of the National Assembly in Bordeaux. Casse returned to Paris on 19 March 1871. He wrote letters to papers in France and abroad stating that Paris was fighting for its municipal rights and for the Republic, which was menaced by the Versailles Assembly, and did not want to rule France.

== Representative (1873–76) ==
Casse was editor of Le Rappel when he was elected Representative of Gaudeloupe in the National Assembly in place of Louis Adolphe Rollin^{(fr)}, who had retired. He won by 6,063 votes out of 10,771. He was representative for Guadeloupe from 5 October 1873 to 7 March 1876, and sat with the Extreme Left parliamentary group. Casse voted against the extension of the powers of Marshal MacMahon, against the state of siege, for dissolution of the Assembly, against the law of the mayors, against the Ministry of Albert de Broglie and for all the constitutional laws. It was due to Casse that the Constitution of 1875 was ratified on 30 January 1875. His vote was decisive in passing the Wallon amendment which established the president of the republic as the chief executive.

== Deputy (1876–89) ==
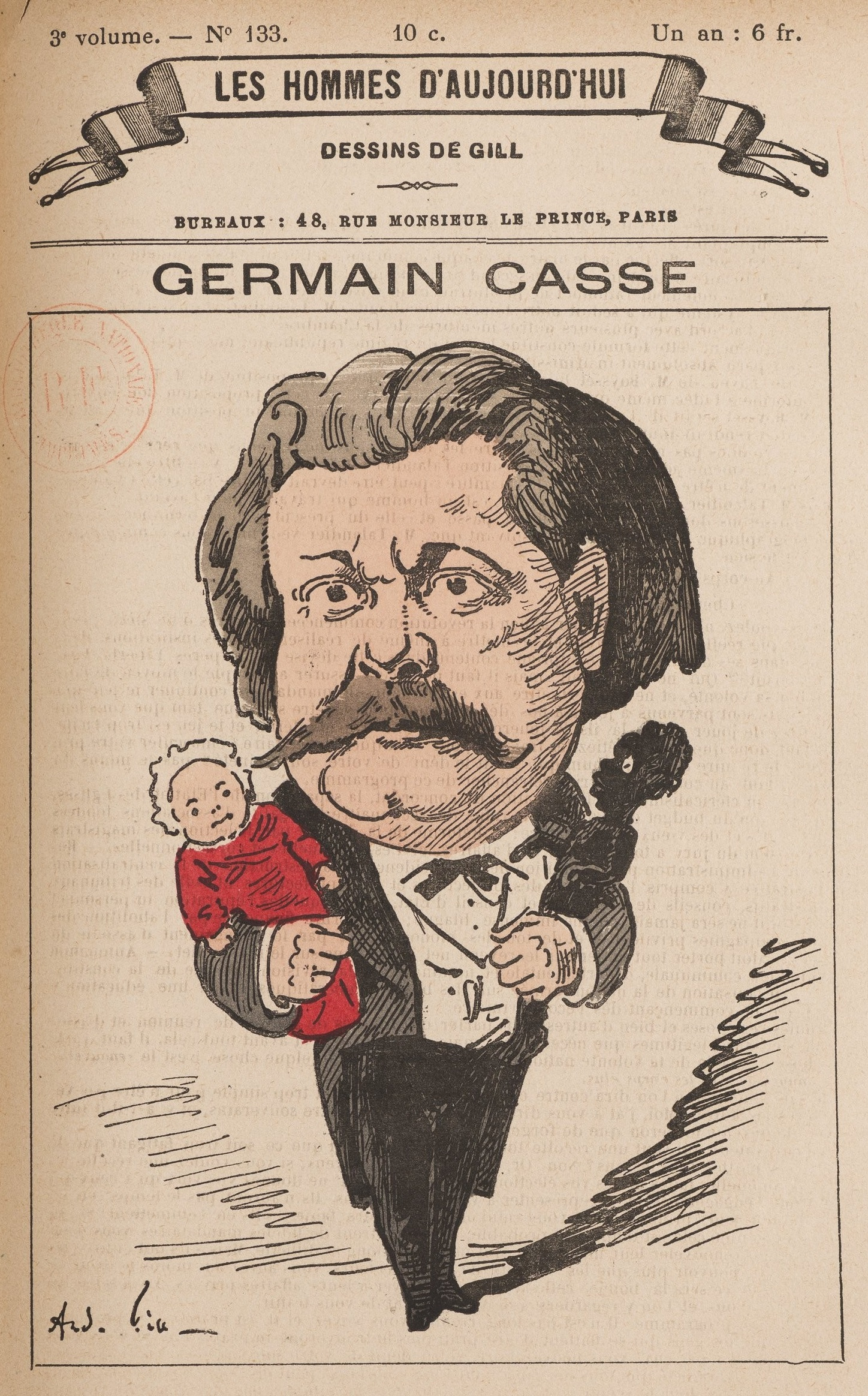
Casse by André Gill (1878)

In the 1876 elections Casse could not run for election for Guadeloupe and chose to run in Paris, first for the 12th arrondissement and then, with the support of the newspaper La République française, in the 14th arrondissement. He was elected on the second ballot on 5 March 1876 by 7,651 out of 9,465 votes. He was among the 363 left-wing deputies who refused their vote of confidence in the ministry of Albert de Broglie after the 16 May 1877 crisis.

Casse was reelected on 14 October 1877 by 9,007 votes out of 11,403. He became a supporter of Léon Gambetta. He voted for full amnesty of the Communards, but distanced himself from the extreme left. Casse was reelected for the 14th arrondissement on 21 August 1881 by 7,685 votes out of 13,656 and joined the Radical Left group, although he generally voted with the moderates. He supported the Gambetta ministry, and voted to give the Ferry ministry the funds requested for the Tonkin Campaign. At this time he began to dabble in financial affairs.

Casse was reelected on 18 October 1885, holding office until 14 October 1889, sitting with the Republican Union group. He supported the various Left ministries. He gained some publicity when an artist, Jean Baffier, assaulted him with a sword cane but only inflicted a minor wound. Baffier said he wanted to punish Casse as a deputy who had betrayed his mandate. The attack was puzzling because by now Casse was a genial supporter of the Opportunist Republicans who liked to indulge in the good life. At the trial Casse asked the jury to be lenient, and his assailant was acquitted. Casse voted for reinstatement of the single-member ballot, against indefinite postponement of the revision of the constitution, for prosecution of three members of the far-right Ligue des Patriotes, against the draft Lisbonne law restricting the freedom of the press and for the prosecution of General Boulanger.

== Last years (1889–1900) ==
Casse did not run for reelection in the general elections of 22 September 1889. On 20 October 1889 he was named Governor of Martinique, and on 1 September 1890 was named Treasurer of Guadeloupe. He was replaced as Governor of Martinique on 4 February 1891 by Delphino Moracchini. On 1 July 1894 he was named Treasurer of Vaucluse. Eugène Casse died on 9 December 1900 in Avignon, Vaucluse.

== Sources ==
- Cahoon, Ben, "Martinique", Worldstatesmen.org
- Champsaur, Félicien (1878), "Germain Casse", Les Hommes d'aujourd'hui (in French), 3 (133), Paris: A. Cinqualbre / Librairie Vanier
- Church, Christopher M. (2017), Paradise Destroyed: Catastrophe and Citizenship in the French Caribbean, U of Nebraska Press, ISBN 978-1-4962-0449-3
- Eugène, François, Germain Casse (in French), Assemblée nationale
- France. Ministère de l'éducation nationale (1882), Recueil des lois et règlements sur l'enseignement supérieur, comprenant les décisions de la jurisprudence et les avis des conseils de l'instruction publique et du Conseil d'état: 1848-1874 (in French), Typographie de Delalain frères
- Jolly, Jean, ed. (1960), "Casse, Eugène François Germain", Dictionnaire des parlementaires français de 1889 à 1940 (in French), Presses universitaires de France
- McWilliam, Neil (2000), Monumental Intolerance: Jean Baffier, a Nationalist Sculptor in Fin-de-Siecle France, Penn State Press, ISBN 0-271-04394-6
- Robert, Adolphe; Cougny, Gaston (1889–1891), "Casse, Eugène François Germain", Dictionnaire des parlementaires français... : depuis le 1er mai 1789 jusqu'au 1er mai 1889 (in French), Paris: Edgar Bourloton
