= Joseph Faron =

French general

Interim Governor of Cochinchina
- In office 10 December 1869 – 9 January 1870
- Monarch: Napoleon III
- Preceded by: Gustave Ohier
- Succeeded by: Alphonse de Cornulier-Lucinière

Personal details
- Born: 12 December 1819 Brest, Finistère, France
- Died: 19 November 1881 (aged 61) Paris, France
- Occupation: General

Joseph Faron (12 December 1819 – 19 November 1881) was a French general. He came from a working-class background and did not complete his secondary education. He served with distinction in Senegal, was interim Governor of French Cochinchina in 1869–70, and played important roles in the two sieges of Paris during and after the Franco-Prussian War.

== Early years (1819–57) ==
Joseph Faron was born in Brest, Finistère, on 12 December 1819. He had very modest origins. He had solid interpersonal skills, great bravery and a good basic education, but no secondary diploma. He entered the naval infantry service on 17 April 1836, and was appointed second lieutenant in 1840, lieutenant in 1843, captain in 1845 and battalion commander in 1857.

== Senegal, Guadeloupe, Cochinchina (1857–70) ==
Faron arrived in Saint-Louis, Senegal in October 1857 as chief of a battalion of naval infantry. Louis Faidherbe had just obtained authorization to create a battalion of Senegalese infantrymen, and placed Faron in charge of the new formation. In 1859 he promoted Faron to Lieutenant Colonel, but Faron remained in charge of the battalion, which was steadily growing in size. He was praised for his ability at Niomré (1858) and at Guémou (1859). In 1862 he participated in the Futa Tooro expedition, for which Bernard Jauréguiberry praised him for "proverbial bravery, important services commanded with complete success, zeal and indefatigable activity." He commanded the first battalion of Senegalese tirailleurs until 1863.

On 1 January 1864 Faron was commandant of the detachment of the 2nd naval infantry regiment in Guadeloupe. He was promoted to colonel on 14 March 1864. Faron was made a Commander of the Legion of Honour on 27 July 1867. He was appointed brigadier general on 8 January 1868.

In 1869 Faron was commander-in-chief of the naval troops in Cochinchina. He succeeded Gustave Ohier as interim governor of Cochinchina on 10 December 1869, and held this position until Alphonse de Cornulier-Lucinière arrived to assume the governorship. He was Interim Governor of Cochinchina from 10 December 1869 to 9 January 1870.

== Franco-Prussian War and Commune (1870–71) ==
Faron returned to France at start of the Franco-Prussian War in July 1870, and was placed in command of a brigade in the thirteenth army corps of General MacMahon, which was never engaged. He was then given command of a division in the first corps of the Second Army of Paris, under the command of General Auguste-Alexandre Ducrot. Faron was appointed Major General on December 2, 1870. His division, which included 35th and 42nd line regiments among others, was constantly active in the sorties around Paris, and preserved its arms at the moment of capitulation.

During the Second Siege of Paris, when the city was controlled by the Paris Commune Faron's troops formed the nucleus of the reserve army commanded by Joseph Vinoy. He operated on the southern front of Paris, where they seized in turn Moulineaux, Clamart station and Fort d'Issy. His division entered Paris on 22 May 1871 by Grenelle and Vaugirard, pushed to the Pont d'Austerlitz and contributed to the taking of the Gare de Lyon, the Place de la Bastille, the Faubourg Saint-Antoine, the Place du Trône and Belleville, the last refuge of the insurrection.

== Last years (1871–81) ==
Faron was made a Grand Officer of the Legion of Honour on 16 May 1871. At the age of 57 Faron was a divisional general, inspector general of the naval troops, and also very rich due to judicious speculations on the stock exchange. Faron died in Paris on 19 November 1881, at the age of 61.

== Publications ==
Publications by Faron include:

- Faron, Joseph (10 September 1870), Place de Paris. 1er secteur. Consigne générale pour la garde nationale et les troupes de toutes armes de service aux remparts, Paris: impr. de Renou et Maulde

== Sources ==
- Cahoon, Ben, "Vietnam: French Cochinchina", Worldstatesmen.org
- Corfield, Justin (2014-11-01), Historical Dictionary of Ho Chi Minh City, Anthem Press, ISBN 978-1-78308-333-6
- "FARON, Joseph", Base Léonore (in French), Archives nationales
- Garnier, Léon; Vapereau, Gustave (1873), "FARON (Joseph)", Dictionnaire universel des contemporains contenant toutes les personnes notables de la France et des pays étrangers (Ouvrage rédigé et tenu à jour avec le concours d'écrivains de tous les pays; Supplément a la quatrieme edition) (in French), Paris: Hachette et cie
- Garric, Alain, "Joseph FARON Le Général", Geneanet (in French)
- Joseph Faron (1819-1881) (in French), BnF: Bibliotheque nationale de France
- Saint-Martin, Yves-Jean (1989), Le Sénégal sous le second Empire: naissance d'un empire colonial (1850-1871) (in French), KARTHALA Editions, ISBN 978-2-86537-201-0
