= René de Cornulier-Lucinière =

French naval officer (1811–1886)

Alphonse Jean Claude René Théodore de Cornulier-Lucinière
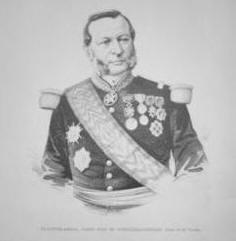

Governor of Cochinchina
- In office 8 January 1870 – 1 April 1871
- Monarch: Napoleon III
- President: Louis-Jules Trochu; Adolphe Thiers
- Preceded by: Joseph Faron
- Succeeded by: Marie Jules Dupré

Personal details
- Born: 16 April 1811
- Died: 23 March 1886 (aged 74)
- Occupation: Naval officer

Alphonse Jean Claude René Théodore de Cornulier-Lucinière (16 April 1811 – 23 March 1886) was a French naval officer.

== Early years (1811-33) ==
Alphonse Jean Claude René Théodore de Cornulier-Lucinière was born on 16 April 1811 in the Château de Lucinière, Joué-sur-Erdre, Loire-Atlantique. His father was Jean-Baptiste de Cornulier-Lucinière, Comte de Lucinière. He joined the navy as élève de la Marine (naval officer candidate, or Midshipman) 2nd class on the training ship Orion in Brest harbour, and in 1830 was named élève 1st class. He was decorated with the Legion of Honour for the taking of the Bône Kasbah on 10 May 1832.

== Naval officer (1833–70) ==
Cornulier was named enseigne de vaisseau (sub-lieutenant) on 1 January 1833. On 4 January 1838 he married Louise-Elisabeth-Charlotte de la Tour-du-Pin-Chambly in Nantes. Their children included Henri-Raoul-René (1838), Paul-Louise-Ernest (1841), Camille-Louis-Marie (1844) and Anne-Augustine-Marie-Victorine (1847). He was promoted to lieutenant de vaisseau 2nd class (lieutenant) on 21 December 1840. He served in Africa and Sumatra. In 1847 he was named Officer of the Portuguese Order of the Tower and Sword for his participation in the Treaty of Setúbal.

Cornulier was promoted to capitaine de fregate (frigate captain) on 2 December 1852. He was made Officer of the Legion of Honour on 12 August 1854 after a cruise in the Black Sea during the Crimean War. Cornulier was promoted to capitaine de vaisseau (captain), and officer of the Turkish Order of the Medjidie on 2 December 1855 for taking the Kinburn Fortress during the Battle of Kinburn. In this attack he commanded the floating battery Lave. He was made a Commander of the Legion of Honour on 12 August 1861. Cornulier participated in the bombardment and capture of Acapulco during the second French intervention in Mexico. He headed the École Navale and was a member of the Admiralty council several times. On 4 March 1868 he was promoted to contre-amiral (rear admiral).

== Cochinchina (1870–71) ==
Cornulier was governor of Cochinchina from 8 January 1870 to 1 April 1871. When he took office Napoleon III told the court of Tự Đức, Emperor of Vietnam, that Cornulier spoke in his name. He seems to have been a liberal governor, tolerating the Buddhist customs of the local people. When news reached Cornulier of the outbreak of the Franco-Prussian War he began preparing the defenses of Saigon to guard against an attack by Prussia. He fell ill after 15 months and asked to be allowed to return to France.

== Last years (1871–86) ==
Cornulier joined the naval reserve in 1873. On 2 March 1874 he was named mayor of Nantes by presidential decree in place of M. Waldeck-Rousseau, who had resigned due to illness. He died on 23 March 1886 in Nantes at the age of 74.

== Sources ==
- Bajot; Poirre (1845), Annales maritimes et coloniales: publiées avec l'approbation du ministre de la marine et des colonies (in French), Imprimerie royale
- Borderie, Arthur de la; Grimaud, Emile (1868), Revue de Bretagne (in French)
- Corfield, Justin (2014-11-01), Historical Dictionary of Ho Chi Minh City, Anthem Press, ISBN 978-1-78308-333-6
- Lainé, P. Louis (1850), J. J. L. Lainé (ed.), Archives généalogiques et historiques de la Noblesse de France; ou, recueil de preuves, mémoires et notices généalogiques, servant à constater l'origine, la filiation, les alliances et les illustrations religieuses, civiles et militaires des diverses maisons et familles nobles du royaume. (Avec la collection des nobiliaires généraux des provinces de France.) (in French), vol. 11
- Ministère de la marine et des colonies (1840), État général de la Marine et des colonies au ler janvier 1840 (in French), Impr. royale
- Perthuis; Nicolliere-Tejeiro (1873), Le Livre Doré de l'Hotel de Ville de Nantes avec les armoiries et les jetons des maires (in French), Nantes: J. Grinsard
