= Charles Antoine François Thomson =

French civil servant

Governor of Cochinchina
- In office 7 November 1882 – 27 July 1885
- President: Jules Grévy
- Preceded by: Charles Le Myre de Vilers
- Succeeded by: Charles Auguste Frédéric Bégin

Personal details
- Born: 25 September 1845 Si-Mustapha, French Algeria
- Died: 8 July 1898 (aged 52) Marseille, France
- Occupation: Colonial administrator

Charles Antoine François Thomson (25 September 1845 – 8 July 1898) was a French civil servant who was sub-prefect and then prefect of various departments of metropolitan France. Between 1882 and 1885, he was governor of the colony of Cochinchina in the south of what is now Vietnam. While in office he forced King Norodom of Cambodia to accept increased French control over the protectorate of Cambodia.

== Life ==
=== Family ===
Charles Antoine François Thomson was born on 25 September 1845 in Si-Mustapha, Algeria. His parents were Peter John Sydney Arnold Thomson (1815–65) and Gabrielle Félicie Bourguet (1825–80). He was an attaché of the Minister of Finance from 1864 to 1870, then was appointed Sub-Prefect of Vervins on 26 November 1870. He was sub-prefect in turn of Briançon, Brignoles and Vendôme. After this he was prefect of Drôme, then Doubs and then the Loire department. On 11 April 1874 Thomson married Louise Valentine Virginie Carilian (1855–1917) in Briançon, Hautes-Alpes. Their children included Charlotte (1875–76), Madeleine Virginie (1876–1951), Jeanne-Louise (1878–96) and Andrée (1886–1967).

=== Governor of Cochinchina ===
French Indochina. Cochinchina is the southernmost province, south of Cambodia.

Thomson was named Governor of Cochinchina by Admiral Bernard Jauréguiberry in 1882. Thomson was governor of French Cochinchina from 7 November 1882 to 27 July 1885. He replaced Charles Le Myre de Vilers. As governor of Cochinchina Thomson was responsible for the protectorate of Cambodia. He wanted to obtain an agreement with King Norodom of Cambodia that the king would honour.

Norodom resisted the demand of the French that he should cover the cost of the French protectorate. Discussions in July 1883 led to an agreement in September 1883 that starting in 1884 the French administration would collect the taxes on sale of opium and liquor to cover their costs. The French also expected that Norodom would allow police posts to be established throughout Cambodia and would give Thomson a draft constitution that would consolidate the reforms that had been agreed. In April 1884 Thomson further proposed that France should take over the customs service of Cambodia. At the same time Thomson was in private negotiations with Norodom's half-brother Sisowath, whom he called, "this prince, who is absolutely devoted to our policy, [who] has long ago adopted our general views leading to the modification of the protectorate."

Norodom was eventually forced to sign the Convention of Phnom Penh on 17 June 1884 to avoid the French installing Sisowath in his place as their puppet. Thomson took a detachment of troops with him to the palace where the convention was signed, and gunboats were stationed nearby and in full view. The treaty established more direct French administration over the protectorate of Cambodia, headed by a French Resident General who reported to the Governor of Cochinchina.

Thomson energetically set out to implement the changes agreed in the convention. However, by the start of January 1885 much of Cambodia was in revolt against the French. On 21 July 1885 Thompson was instructed to return to France by the next boat to report on the situation, handing over to General Charles Auguste Frédéric Bégin as Acting Governor. Bégin had been senior military commander of Cochinchina since 20 March 1885. Bégin disliked Thomson's policies, and maneuvered to ensure that Thomson did not return. On 28 October 1885 he wrote,

Norodom was humiliated and abused. A very hard treaty was imposed on him by force... The Queen Mother, for whom he professes deep respect and filial piety, would not have not forgiven him for accepting without struggle the humiliation we imposed ... even if we admit the implicit guilt of the King, we cannot now think of deposing him. We must avoid touching the edifice, because the mandarins will take the opportunity to again push the people to revolt, telling him that we want to overturn everything ... We must live with the evil and avoid any further irritation ... The first requirement is to place beside the King, both in Cambodia and in Cochinchina, men who did not take part in the events of 17 June. Norodom will never pardon Mr. Thomson for having humiliated and abused him in the presence of his Ministers and of his Court.

=== Last years ===
Thomson was technically Governor of Cochinchina until March 1886, but did not return to the colony after July 1885. He was French Minister in Copenhagen in 1891, Treasurer of Hérault and then of Bouches-du-Rhône. Thomson died on 8 July 1898 in Marseille, Bouches-du-Rhône.

== Sources ==
- Blanchard, Marcel (1952), "Administrateurs d'Indochine (1880-1890)" (PDF), Outre-Mers. Revue d'histoire (137)
- "Charles Auguste Frédéric BEGIN", military-photos.com (in French)
- Chausse, Jean Marie de, "Charles Antoine Françis THOMSON", Geneanet
- Corfield, Justin (2014-11-01), Historical Dictionary of Ho Chi Minh City, Anthem Press, ISBN 978-1-78308-333-6
- "The Conquest and Settlement of Cochinchina", Les Colonies Françaises, Colonies Administration of the French Naval Ministry, 1899
