= François Pierre Rodier =

French colonial administrator

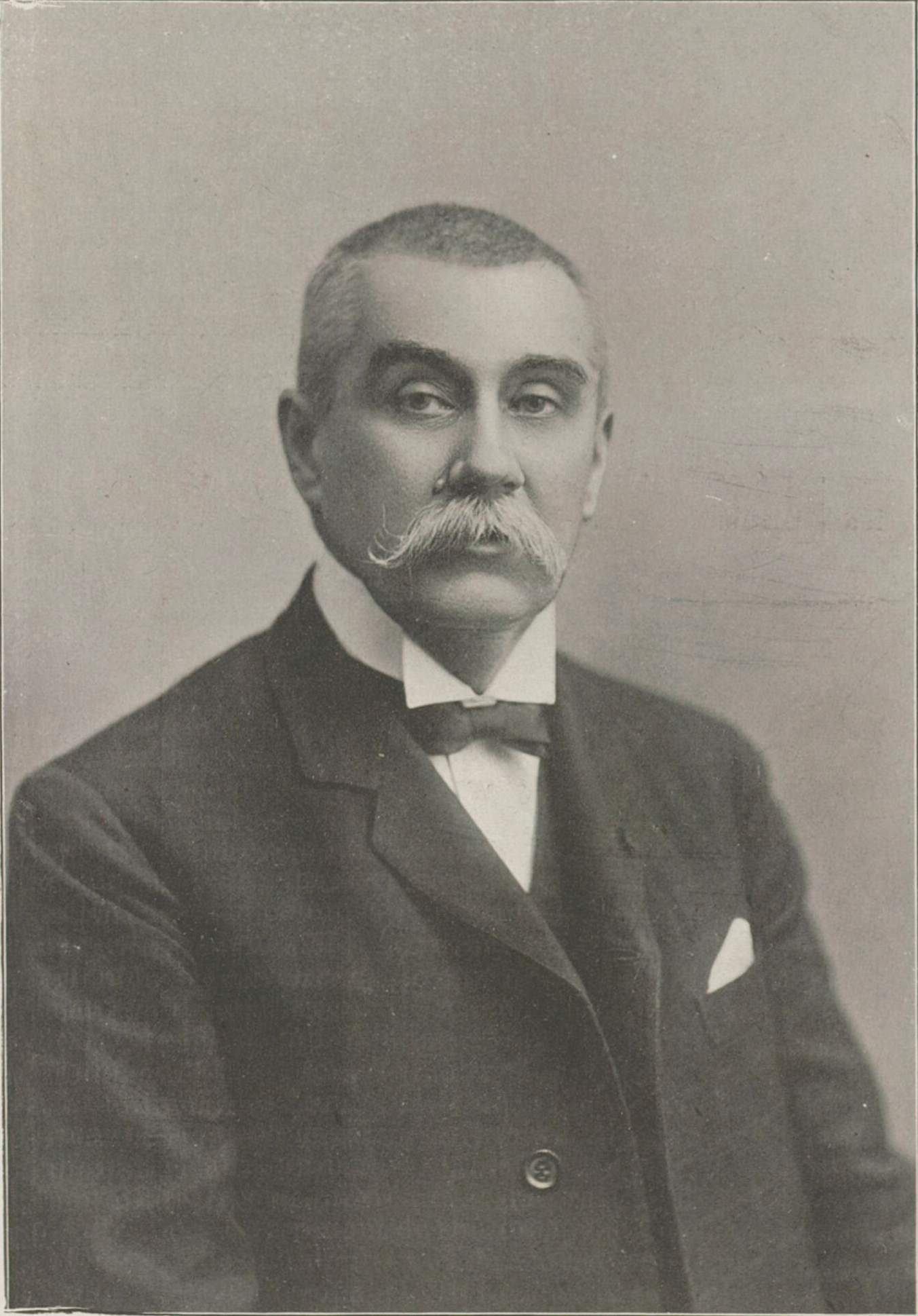
François Pierre Rodier

François Pierre Rodier (1854–1913) was a French colonial administrator. He was Governor General for various colonies in the Second French Colonial Empire under Third Republic, including Cochinchina, French Guiana, Réunion (1810-1912), and French Equatorial Africa (1913). He was born in Toulouse, Haute-Garonne, France.

Government offices
Preceded by Léon Jean Laurent Chavassieux (Acting for Jean-Marie de Lanessan)	Governor-General of French Indochina (Acting); 29 December 1894–16 March 1895	Succeeded by Paul Armand Rosseau
Preceded by Henri Félix de Lamothe	Governor General of Cochinchina; 1902–1906	Succeeded by Olivier Charles Arthur de Lalande de Calan
Preceded by Louis Jean Girod	Governor General of French India; February 1898–11 January 1902	Succeeded by Pelletan (Acting)
