= Louis Hippolyte Marie Nouet =

French colonial administrator

Louis Hippolyte Marie Nouet (born September 5, 1844, in Quimper - died February 15, 1933, in Vannes) was Governor General for Inde française in the Second French Colonial Empire under Third Republic. He was also Governor General for New Caledonia from 1886 to 1888, for Martinique in 1890 and for Guadeloupe from 1891 to 1894.

== Biography ==
Nouet was born in Quimper, Finistère, at 10 am on 5 September 1844 the son of Frederic Nouet, a member of the conseil général du Finistère, and his wife Rosalie. Nouet studied at the École spéciale militaire de Saint-Cyr from 17 October 1864 and was commissioned as a sub-lieutenant in the 2nd Marine Infantry Regiment on 1 October 1866. Nouet served in French Cochinchina from 20 September 1866. He became a trainee inspector of indigenous affairs on 24 October 1867; he transferred to the general staff on 11 January 1868 and was promoted to lieutenant on 16 September, also becoming a 4th class inspector that month. Nouet became a 3rd class inspector on 25 May 1871, a 2nd class inspector on 31 March 1873 and a 1st class administrator on 1 April 1873; his army rank was advanced to captain on 10 November 1873. Nouet remained in Indo-China until at least 1881, with a 4 month period of leave in 1874 and again in 1879. He was appointed a principal administrator on 25 June 1881.

Nouet was appointed a chevalier of the Royal Order of Cambodia. He was appointed a chevalier of the Legion of Honour on 6 July 1881, on the recommendation of Arthur de Trentinian, brigadier general and governor of the interior of French Cochinchina. The award was made on 2 September at Saigon.

Nouet served as Governor General for New Caledonia from March 1886 to July 1888. He afterwards served in India before being posted, in 1890, as governor of Martinique. On 21 April 1894 he was appointed governor of Guadeloupe, serving until 1894. He was a member of the Committee for the Protection and Defence of Natives in 1900. Nouet was made an officer of the Legion of Honour on 9 January 1894 for his service to the Ministry of Commerce and Colonies. Nouet died at Vannes, Morbihan, on 15 February 1933.

Government offices
Preceded by Georges Jules Piquet	Gouverneur Général de l'Inde française 1889–1891	Succeeded by Léon Émile Clément-Thomas
