= 1962 in South Vietnam =

- Decades: 1950s; 1960s; 1970s
- See also: Other events of 1962; Timeline of Vietnamese history

The following lists events that happened during 1962 in South Vietnam.

== Events ==
=== January ===
- January 1 – The People's Revolutionary Party was founded as a Marxist–Leninist political party in South Vietnam, and its leaders receiving instruction directly from the Lao Dong Party of North Vietnam.
- January 3 – The first United States military transport aircraft arrive in South Vietnam. The aircraft would be used to transport South Vietnamese soldiers.
- January 12 – Operation Chopper, the first American combat mission in Vietnam, began as the American pilots transported hundreds of South Vietnamese troops to fight against a Viet Cong force near Saigon. Three days later, President of the United States John F. Kennedy told reporters at a press conference that American troops were not being used in combat.

=== February ===
- February 27 – Sublieutenant Nguyễn Văn Cử and Lt. Phạm Phú Quốc, two members of the Republic of Vietnam Air Force, diverted from their combat mission south of Saigon and dropped bombs upon the presidential palace in an attempt to assassinate President Ngô Đình Diệm. One of the 500 pound bombs landed in the room where the President and his advisers were, but failed to detonate because it had been dropped from too low an altitude to arm itself. Quốc was arrested after being forced to land, while Cử fled to neighboring Cambodia. Both men would be reinstated to the Air Force after Diem's assassination in 1963.
