= Bombing of Tan Son Nhut Air Base =

Part of the Vietnam War (1975)

- Part of Fall of Saigon, Vietnam War
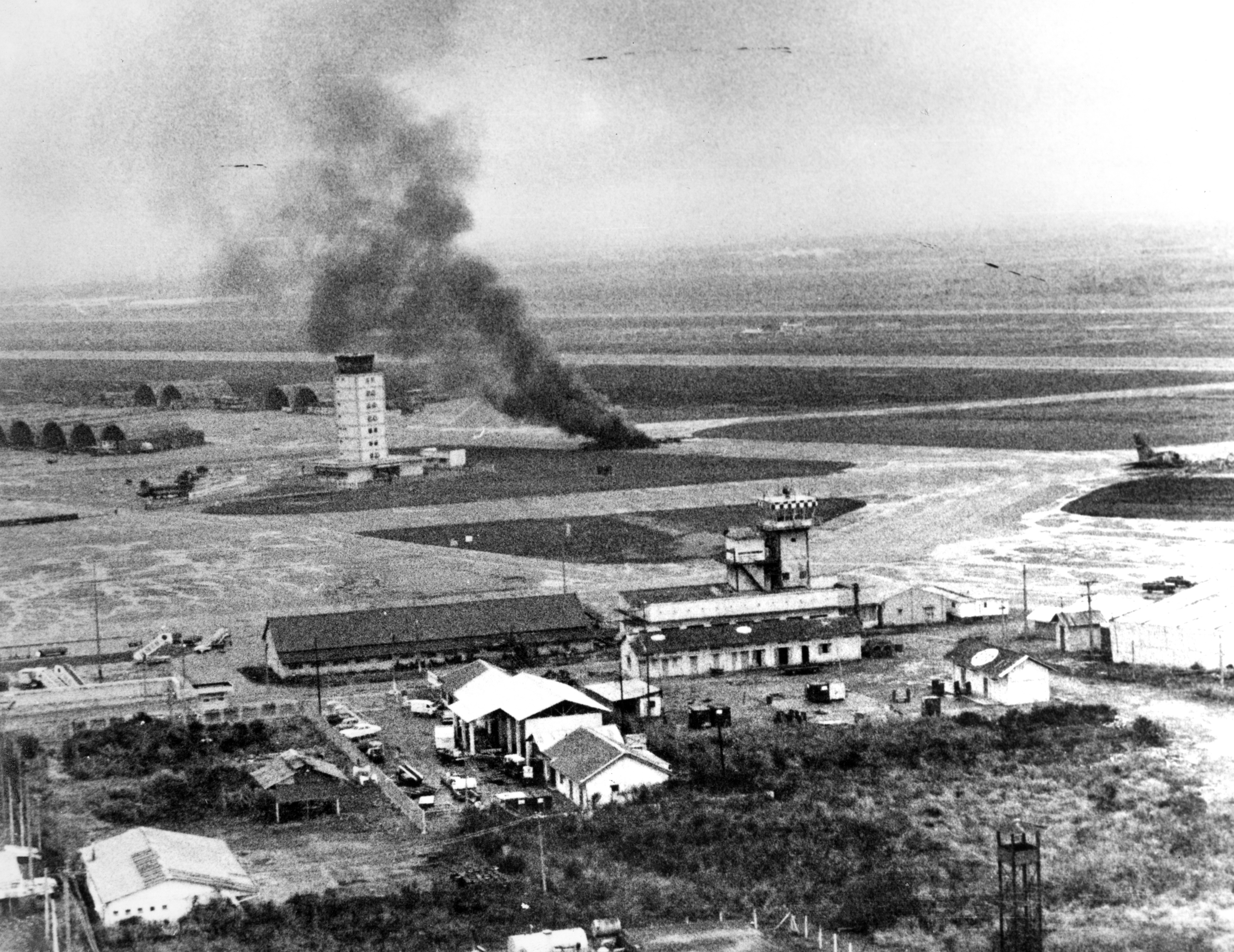
- Tan Son Nhut Air Base being shelled by NVA/LASV on 29 April 1975, one day after the bombing and one day before the total Fall of Saigon, at the final moments of the Ho Chi Minh campaign.
Date	28 April 1975
Location	Tan Son Nhut Air Base, South Vietnam
Result	North Vietnamese victory

Belligerents
South Vietnam	North Vietnam

Commanders and leaders
Nguyen Huu Tan	Nguyen Van Luc

Units involved
5th Air Force Division	Quyet Thang Squadron

Strength
1 air force division	1 squadron

Casualties and losses
3 F-5, 4 C-119, 3 C-47 and 1 DC-3 destroyed	None

The Bombing of Tan Son Nhut Air Base occurred on 28 April 1975, just two days before the Fall of Saigon. The bombing operation was carried out by the Vietnam People's Air Force (VPAF) Quyet Thang Squadron, using captured Republic of Vietnam Air Force (RVNAF) A-37 Dragonfly aircraft flown by VPAF pilots and RVNAF defectors led by Nguyen Thanh Trung who had bombed the Presidential Palace in Saigon on 8 April 1975.

In 1973, by the time the Paris Peace Accords were concluded, South Vietnam possessed the fourth largest air force in the world. Despite their size, however, RVNAF operations were severely curtailed due to cutbacks in U.S. military aid. Furthermore, the RVNAF were prevented from undertaking reconnaissance and ground support missions due to the threat posed by formidable anti-aircraft weapons deployed by North Vietnam. When the North Vietnamese military renewed their offensive early in 1975, the RVNAF was handicapped and many of their aircraft were either lost or captured as formations of the People's Army of Vietnam (PAVN) swept through the Central Highlands of South Vietnam.

== Background ==
=== Strategic situation ===
Although the Paris Peace Accords of 1973 were supposed to end the war in Vietnam, fighting continued between South Vietnam and North Vietnam and the Viet Cong (VC). Despite a pledge of support from U.S. President Richard Nixon, military aid to South Vietnam was sharply reduced. By the end of 1972 the RVNAF was the fourth largest air force in the world, with 2,075 aircraft and over 61,000 personnel. However, RVNAF operations were severely affected by cutbacks in military aid, flying hours had to be reduced by 51% and bomb loads on fighter aircraft halved from four to two pieces of ordnance.

North Vietnam continued to build up its combat units in South Vietnam. With the threat of U.S. airpower removed, the North Vietnamese military moved anti-aircraft units into South Vietnam, and deployed a sophisticated air-defence network that included the long-range SA-2 surface-to-air missile system, radar-guided anti-aircraft guns and the SA-7 Grail shoulder-launched missile The strong presence of North Vietnamese anti-aircraft units, which covered much of the northern provinces of South Vietnam, forced RVNAF reconnaissance and fighter aircraft to fly at higher altitudes to avoid being hit by surface-to-air missiles. Consequently, when North Vietnam went on the offensive again in 1975, the RVNAF was severely handicapped.

=== Ho Chi Minh Campaign ===
The Ho Chi Minh Campaign commenced on 9 March 1975 and by mid-March the Army of the Republic of Vietnam (ARVN) had withdrawn from the Central Highlands. The RVNAF 6th Air Force Division had been given only 48 hours to evacuate its aircraft and personnel from Pleiku Air Base leaving 64 aircraft intact, including 36 aircraft in flyable storage, and no attempt were made to put those aircraft into commission. On 27 March with South Vietnamese forces of I Corps facing imminent defeat, Brigadier-General Nguyen Duc Khanh, commander of the RVNAF 1st Air Force Division, was ordered to evacuate all flyable aircraft from Huế and Da Nang.

On 28 March PAVN forces closed in on Da Nang, and they subjected Da Nang Air Base to heavy artillery bombardment. Under adverse conditions, the RVNAF was able to fly about 130 aircraft out of the city, but they had to abandon 180 aircraft, including 33 A-37 Dragonflys, due to chaos, confusion, poor discipline and the breakdown of airfield security. On 29 March, the PAVN captured Da Nang, followed by Quy Nhon on 1 April and Tuy Hòa and Nha Trang on 2 April. At Phan Rang Air Base, the RVNAF 2nd Air Division continued to battle PAVN troops for two days after ground units of the ARVN had given up the fight. Elements of the ARVN Airborne Division were also committed into the fight, but they were overwhelmed by the PAVN and Phan Rang was captured on 16 April.

=== Attack on the Presidential Palace ===
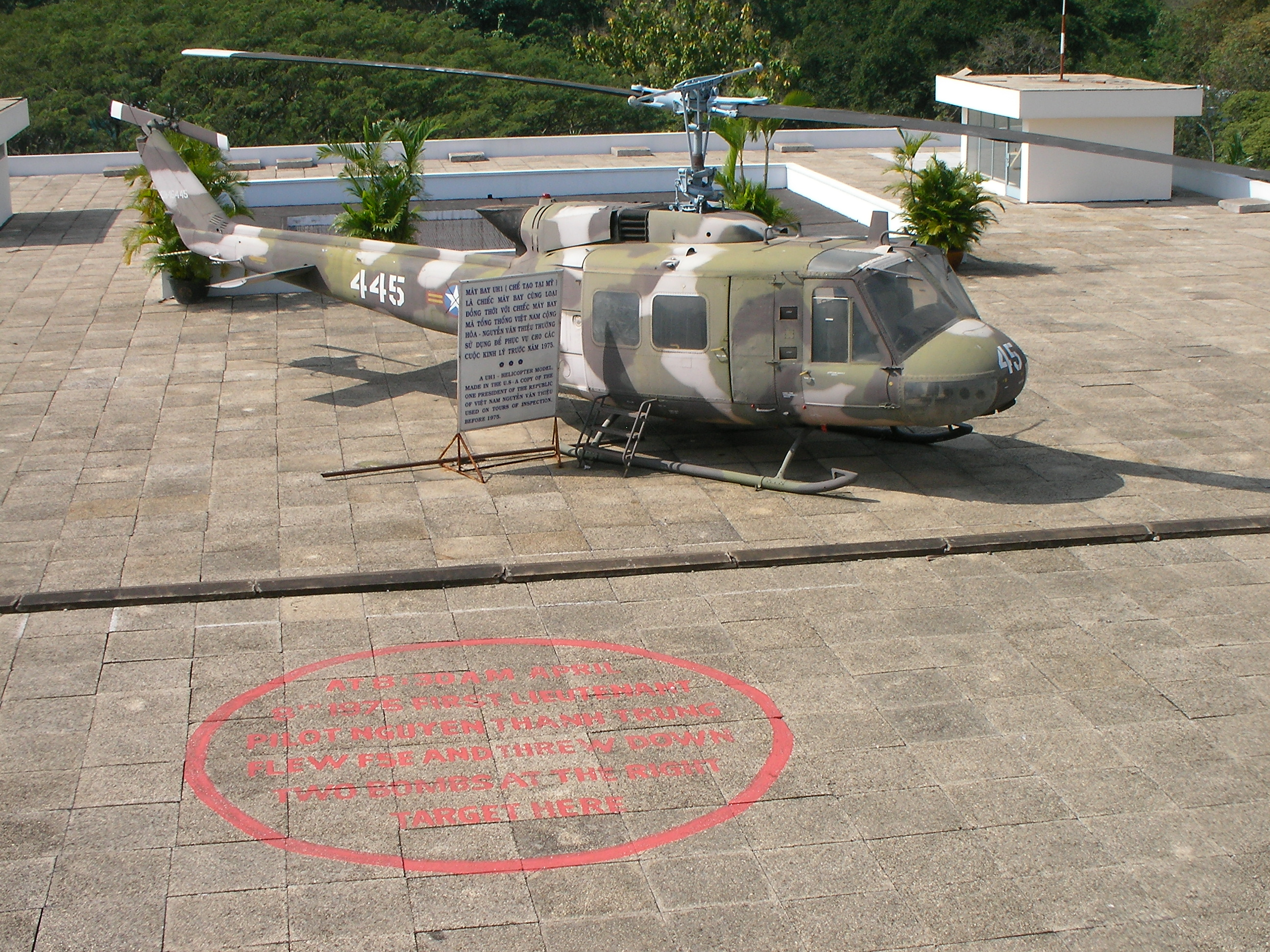
The red circle marks the impact point of one of Lt Trung's bombs on the roof of the Presidential Palace

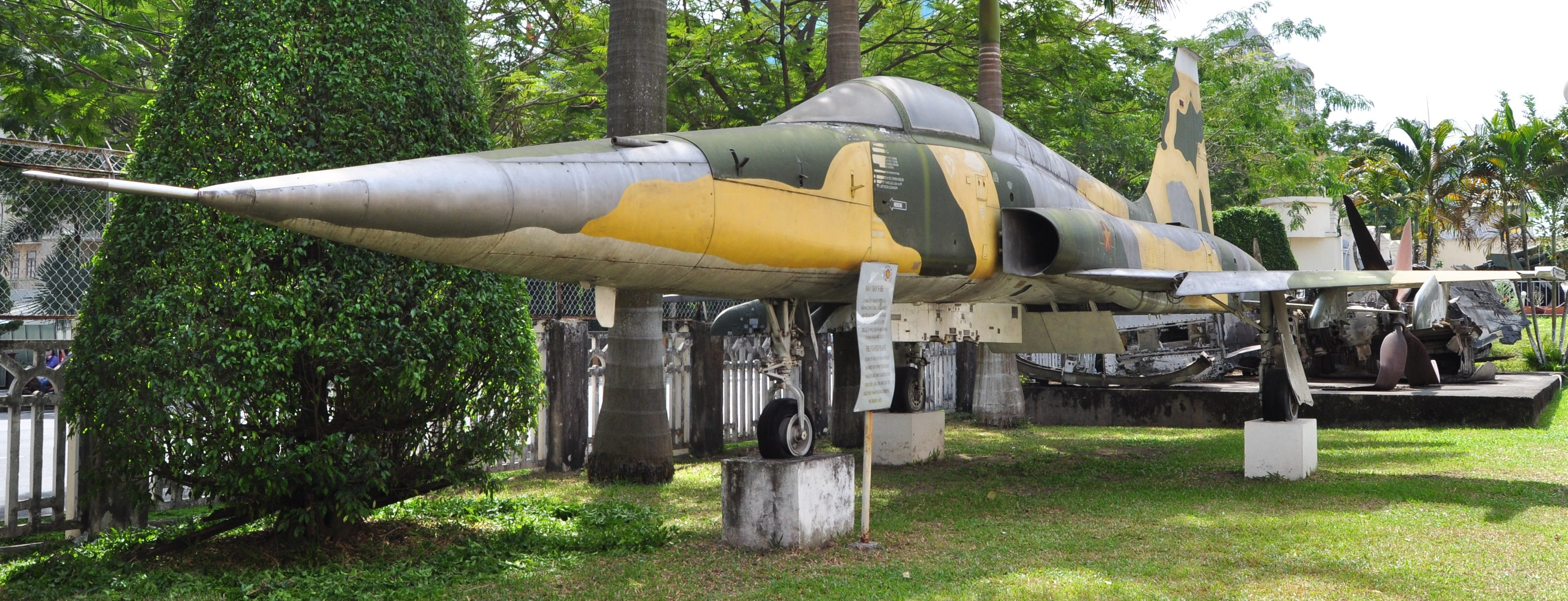
The F-5E flown by Nguyen Thanh Trung

On 8 April, a formation of three RVNAF F-5E Tiger fighter-bombers lined up at Bien Hoa Air Base, each armed with four 250-pound bombs, for an attack on PAVN positions in Bình Thuận Province. Before the second aircraft took off, First Lieutenant Nguyen Thanh Trung, who piloted the third F-5, reported his aircraft was experiencing afterburner problems. When the second aircraft departed, Trung also took off, but flew towards Saigon instead of joining the formation. At around 8.30am Trung dived on the Presidential Palace and dropped two bombs; the first bomb landed on the Palace grounds and caused some damage, but the second bomb failed to explode. Trung climbed to over 1,000 meters (3,300 ft) before making a second pass, this time both bombs exploded, causing minor structural damage but no casualties. After the attack, Trung flew out of Saigon and landed at the petroleum storage facility at Nha Be on the outskirts of the city, where he removed the ammunition for the 20mm cannon.

Shortly afterwards Trung took off again and flew out to Phước Long Province, which was occupied by the Provisional Revolutionary Government since PAVN troops had captured it earlier in the year, and he was warmly received by PAVN soldiers. The North Vietnamese claimed that Trung had been a VC agent since 1969, and was infiltrated into the RVNAF where he served with the 540th Fighter Squadron of the 3rd Air Force Division. Trung later revealed that he was originally from Bến Tre Province in the Mekong region, where his father had served as the district secretary of the People's Revolutionary Party. In 1963 Trung's father was killed and his body was mutilated by the South Vietnamese police. Angered by the death of his father, Trung vowed to take revenge on the South Vietnamese Government, so in 1969 he secretly joined the VC after he had been accepted into the RVNAF.

== Battle ==
=== Preparation for the mission ===
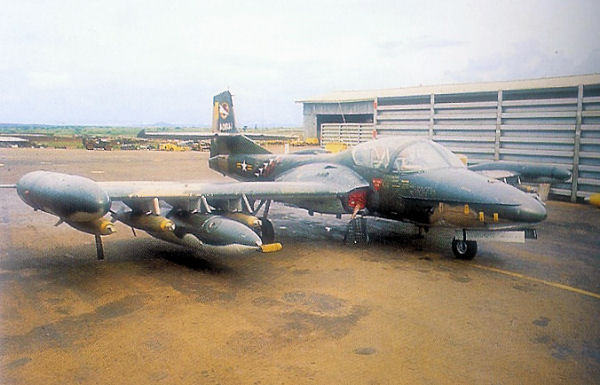
Captured A-37 fighter-bombers were selected to be the basis of the VPAF Quyet Thang Squadron in 1975 for their attack on Tan Son Nhut Air Base

Prior to the bombing of the Presidential Palace, North Vietnamese General Văn Tiến Dũng and his field commanders had been discussing the possibility of deploying units of the VPAF, to attack high-value South Vietnamese targets in support of the PAVN. Use of the Soviet MiG-17 fighter was considered as VPAF pilots already had significant combat experience with the type. However, moving MiGs from their bases in North Vietnam was problematic; South Vietnamese defenses were falling much faster than anticipated, there was simply little time in which to deploy the MiGs in support of North Vietnamese units encircling Saigon. As the North Vietnamese had captured a large number of U.S.-made aircraft from the RVNAF at Pleiku and Da Nang Air Bases, it was decided to use captured aircraft instead.

The decision to use the captured aircraft presented a challenge for the VPAF, because they lacked experience in flying U.S.-made aircraft. Furthermore, VPAF pilots were not proficient in the English language; most had trained on Soviet equipment using the Russian language. Upon receiving news of Trung's actions on 8 April, General Dung decided that Trung would provide conversion training so that a group of VPAF pilots would be able to fly the A-37 Dragonfly, the type selected for an upcoming operation. Trung was sent out to Da Nang Air Base, where he was joined by Lieutenants Tran Van On and Tran Van Xanh, both former RVNAF pilots, captured when Da Nang capitulated on 29 March. Trung, Xanh, and On were tasked with translating manuals from English to the Vietnamese language, as well as translating instructions on board the A-37 into Vietnamese.

On 19 April the VPAF Command was ordered to prepare for an operation in South Vietnam, so a group of pilots from the 4th Squadron of the VPAF 923rd Fighter Regiment was selected to undertake conversion training in Da Nang and form a new squadron for the operation. The selected group was led by Upper Captain Nguyen Van Luc along with Tu De, Tran Cao Thang, Han Van Quang and Hoang Mai Vuong. Together with former RVNAF pilots Trung and On, the group would form the Quyet Thang ("Determined to Win") Squadron. On 22 April the VPAF pilots arrived at Da Nang Air Base and they began training on two A-37 aircraft that were restored to flying condition with support from Trung, On, Xanh and a few captured South Vietnamese technicians. In just five days, the VPAF pilots were able to independently fly the A-37 without support from the former RVNAF pilots.

As the VPAF pilots were completing the final phases of their conversion training, the VPAF Command chose to attack Tan Son Nhut Air Base in Saigon. On the afternoon of 27 April, the pilots were flown out to Phù Cát Air Base in Bình Định Province where Major-General Le Van Tri, commander of the VPAF, briefed them on the upcoming operation. Tri also instructed the pilots to ensure that their bombs should not hit civilian areas in Saigon. From the original group of trainees, Luc, De, Quang, Vuong, Trung and On were selected to take part in the attack. Meanwhile, On and Xanh were also instructed to test-fly five captured A-37 bombers, which would be the mainstay of the Quyet Thang Squadron. On the morning of 28 April the Quyet Thang Squadron became operational with Luc as the squadron's commander, when it was transferred to Phan Rang Air Base.

=== The attack ===
At Phan Rang AB, Luc submitted the squadron's plan of attack to the VPAF Command, Trung would lead the formation in the first aircraft because he was familiar with the skies over Saigon, De would be positioned behind Trung in the second aircraft, followed by Luc in the third, Vuong and On together in the fourth and Quang would pilot the last aircraft in the formation. At around 16:05 on 28 April the five A-37 bombers of the Quyet Thang Squadron, each armed with four 250-pound bombs, took off from Phan Rang and each aircraft flew between 600 meters (2,000 ft) and 800 meters (2,600 ft) apart from each other. The five-aircraft formation flew at a height of just 1,000 meters (3,300 ft). Their first navigation point was Vũng Tàu, from where the formation would turn towards Tan Son Nhut. When the squadron flew over Bien Hoa Air Base, two RVNAF A-1 Skyraiders were sighted conducting bombing sorties near the area, but they were not allowed to engage.

Shortly after 17:00 the formation was able to approach Tan Son Nhut Air Base unchallenged as they were still wearing South Vietnamese code numbers. From about 2,000 meters (6,600 ft) above the target Trung dived down on the target, but his bombs could not be released from the pylons, so Trung was forced to pull his aircraft up again. Next in line was De, who was able to drop his entire bomb load on the target. Luc dived on the target, but he too experienced problems with the weapons release system, so only two bombs were dropped. After the last two aircraft piloted by Vuong, Quang and On had successfully hit their targets, they strafed aircraft on the ground with gunfire. Trung and Luc made another pass, but again their bombs could not be released from the pylon.

By that stage the South Vietnamese had already responded by firing their anti-aircraft guns, so Luc ordered the squadron to withdraw as Trung made one final attempt at dropping his load using emergency mode. Several RVNAF F-5s were scrambled to pursue the attackers, but they escaped without any damage. On the return trip Quang led the formation, followed by Luc, De and Vuong and On. Trung, who had flown back for the third bombing attempt, was trailing the rest of the group. As they flew over Phan Thiết, they had to fly at a lower altitude to avoid mistakenly being hit by PAVN anti-aircraft weapons. When the formation came within 40 kilometers (25 mi) of Phan Rang AB, De was granted permission to land first because he only had about 600 liters (130 imp gal; 160 U.S. gal) of fuel left. Squadron commander Luc was next to land, followed by Vuong and On, then Quang. Trung, who had led the attack during the mission, was the last aircraft to arrive back at base. By 18:00 on 28 April all the pilots of the VPAF Quyet Thang Squadron had landed at Phan Rang, after completing North Vietnam's first successful air attack against Saigon during the entire Vietnam War.

== Aftermath ==
The attack on Tan Son Nhut temporarily closed the airport, but it was soon returned to operation. The true extent of the damage is unknown; the North Vietnamese claimed that 24 aircraft had been destroyed and about 200 South Vietnamese personnel were killed, but U.S. sources state that only three AC-119s and several C-47s were destroyed, with no mention of casualties.

By the night of 28 April, North Vietnamese artillery and rockets were hitting Tan Son Nhut. At dawn on 29 April, the RVNAF began to haphazardly depart Tan Son Nhut Air Base as A-37s, F-5s, C-7s, C-119s, and C-130s departed for Thailand, while UH-1 helicopters took off in search of the evacuation fleet of Task Force 76. Some RVNAF aircraft, however, did stay and continue to fight the advancing PAVN. One AC-119 gunship had spent the night of 28/29 April dropping flares and firing on the approaching PAVN. At dawn on 29 April, two A-1 Skyraiders began patrolling the perimeter of Tan Son Nhut at 2,500 feet (760 m) until one was shot down, presumably by an SA-7. At 07:00, the AC-119 was firing on PAVN formations to the east of Tan Son Nhut when it too was hit by an SA-7 and fell in flames to the ground. Due to the deteriorating situation at Tan Son Nhut, the fixed-wing evacuation of Saigon was cancelled and Operation Frequent Wind was commenced.
