= Museum of Ho Chi Minh City =

Museum in Ho Chi Minh, Vietnam

- Bảo tàng Thành phố Hồ Chí Minh
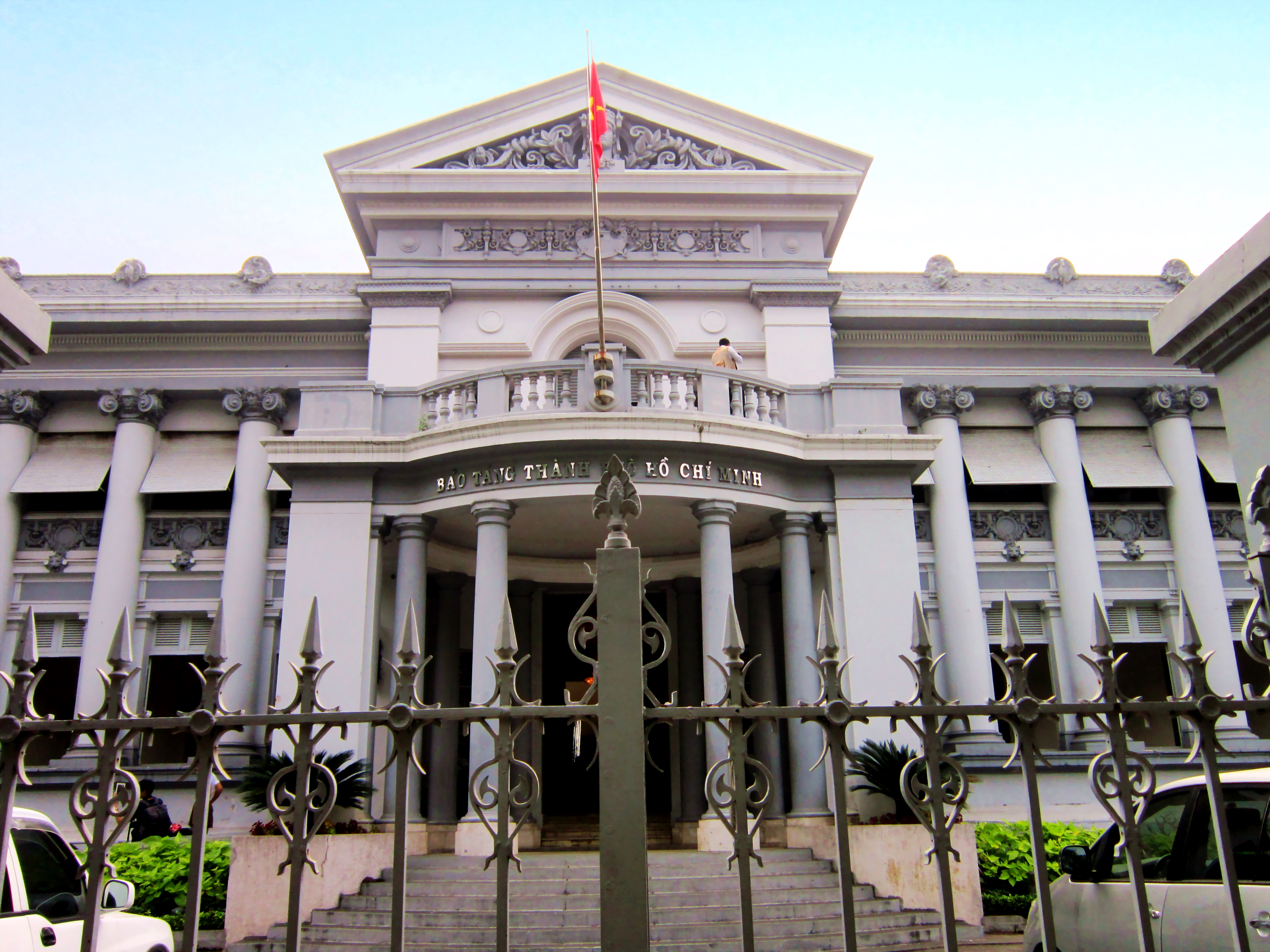
- Former names: Palais du Gouverneur de la Cochinchine, Palais du Lieutenant-Gouverneur, Gia Long Palace
- Established: 12 August 1978
- Location: Ho Chi Minh City, Vietnam
- Coordinates: 10°46′34.0″N 106°41′59.0″E
- Type: Local museum
- Architect: Marie-Alfred Foulhoux
- Public transit access: 1 Opera House
- Website: hcmc-museum.edu.vn

Museum of Ho Chi Minh City (Vietnamese: Bảo tàng Thành phố Hồ Chí Minh), formerly known as Gia Long Palace (Vietnamese: Dinh Gia Long), is a historical site and museum in Ho Chi Minh City, Vietnam. The museum is situated at the corner of Lý Tự Trọng and Nam Kỳ Khởi Nghĩa streets, located on a 2-hectare block near the Independence Palace.

== History ==
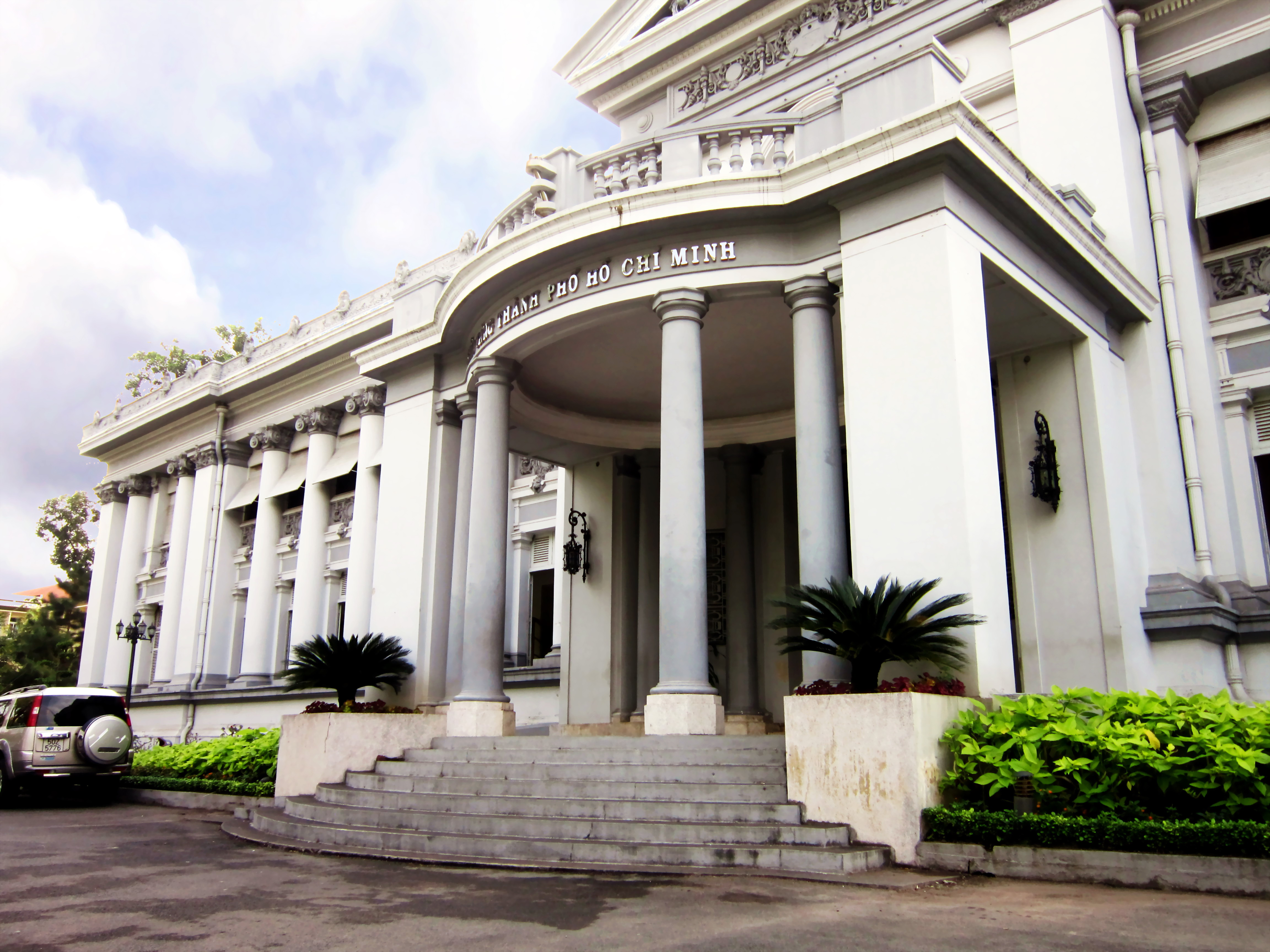
Closer frontal view

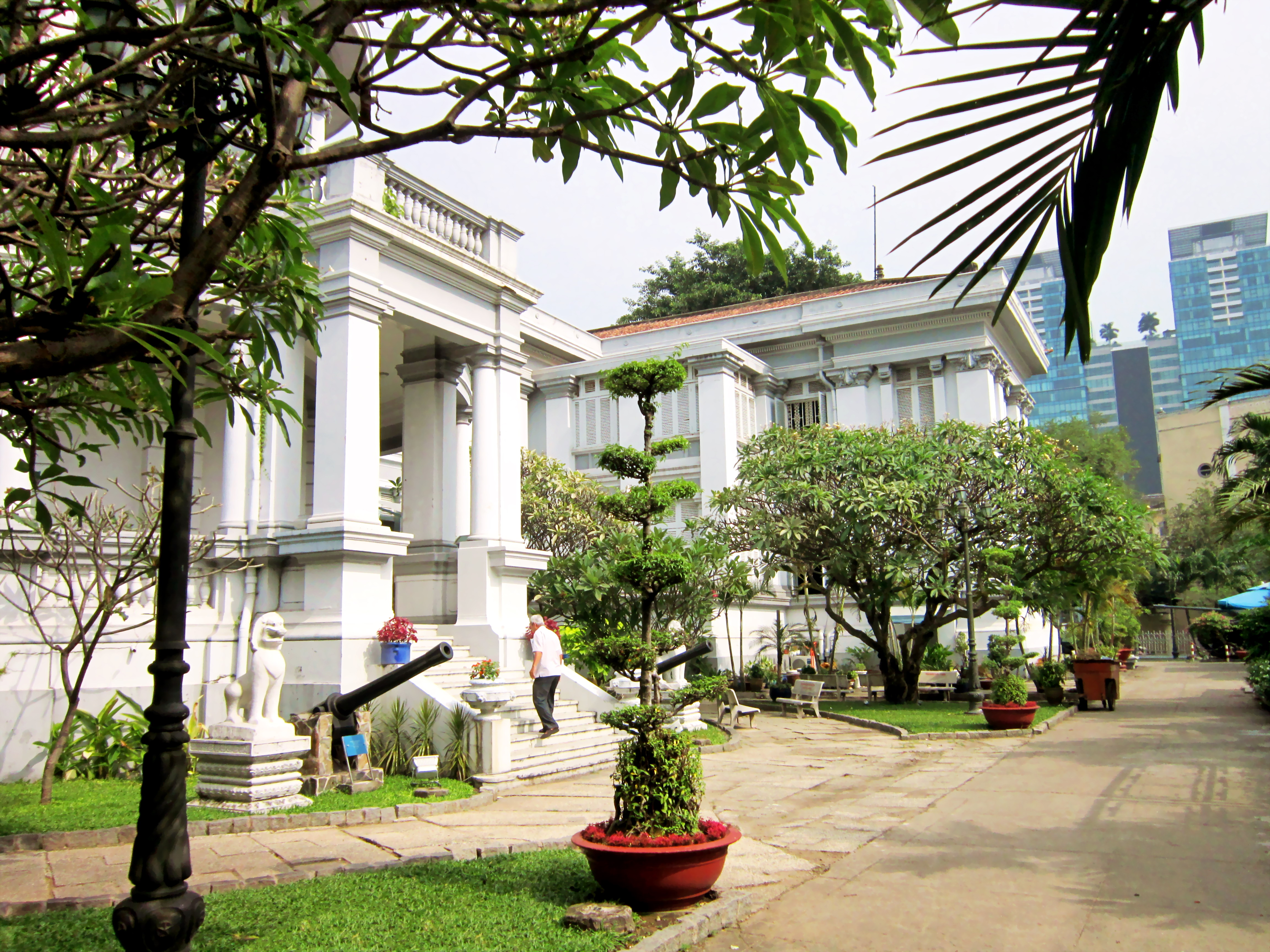
Palace gardens

=== Under French Indochina ===
Construction of the palace began in 1885 and completed in 1890, and was designed by French architect Alfred Foulhoux to house the Museum of Commercial Trade, exhibiting products and goods of Southern Vietnam. However, the building soon became the residence of the Governor of Cochinchina, starting with Henri Éloi Danel (1850 - 1898).

=== World War II era ===
In 1945, control of the palace changed hands several times. After the Japanese Imperial Army toppled the colonial regime of French Indochina on March 9, French governor Ernest Thimothée Hoeffel was arrested, and the palace became the residence for Japanese Governor Yoshio Minoda.

On August 14, the Japanese handed over the palace to its puppet Empire of Vietnam government, to be used as the residence of Lieutenant General Nguyễn Văn Sâm.

On August 25, the Việt Minh seized, arresting Nguyễn Văn Sâm and Secretary of the Office of the Lieutenant General Hồ Văn Ngà. After, the building became the headquarters of the Provisional Administrative Committee of Southern Vietnam, later renamed the "People's Committee of Southern Vietnam".

On September 10, Lt. Col. B. W. Roe (from the British military mission) occupied the palace and made it the Allied Mission headquarters, evicting the "People's Committee".

On October 5, the building was used by General Leclerc as the temporary headquarters of the High Commission for the French Republic in Indochina. After Admiral Georges Thierry d'Argenlieu from the High Commission selected Norodom Palace to be the commission's new location, the palace was used as Leclerc's office, this time as the official headquarters of the Commissioner of the French Republic in Southern Vietnam.

=== Under the State of Vietnam ===
After the French reconquest of Indochina, on June 2, 1948, the French government handed over the building to the Provisional Government of the State of Vietnam, establishing its headquarters there. It was later transformed into the Palace of the Premier, serving as official residence of the Premier of the State of Vietnam, starting with Premier Trần Văn Hữu.

On January 9, 1950, a large protest of over 6000 students and educational instructors demanded the release of students arrested for advocating Vietnamese independence. At 13:00, Premier Trần Văn Hữu ordered the police to quash the protest, arresting 150 people, injuring 30, and 1 student, Trần Văn Ơn from Petrus Ký High School, died from his injuries. Trần Văn Ơn's funeral on January 12, 1950, had 25,000 attendees.

=== Under the Republic of Vietnam ===
From June 26 to September 7, 1954, this palace was used as the temporary official residence of the Prime Minister (Ngô Đình Diệm), since Norodom Palace was still occupied by French High Commissioner Gen. Paul Ely. Bảo Đại renamed the palace to Gia Long Palace, and its street was renamed Gia Long Street (from La Grandìere). This was also the last residence of President of the Republic of Vietnam Ngô Đình Diệm, beginning 27 February 1962 after Norodom Palace was bombed and partially destroyed by mutinous Air Force pilots. Diệm had been Prime Minister since 1954, and president since 1955, but originally lived in the Independence Palace until it was bombed by two mutinous pilots of the Republic of Vietnam Air Force. As a result, Diệm had to relocate, and ordered a new palace to be built, moving to Gia Long Palace in the interim. It was the last place Diệm worked before his assassination on 2 November 1963 in a coup d’état.

The Supreme Court of the Republic of Vietnam (Tối cao Pháp viện Việt Nam Cộng hòa) was housed in the Palace, from October 31, 1966, to April 30, 1975, the Fall of Saigon.

=== Under Socialist Republic of Vietnam ===
After the North Vietnamese communist invasion of South Vietnam, on 12 August 1978 the Ho Chi Minh City People's Committee ordered that the former Supreme Court be used as the Ho Chi Minh City Revolutionary Museum (Bảo tàng Cách mạng Thành phố Hồ Chí Minh), later renamed to its current name on 13 December 1999.

== Architecture ==
The 2-floored palace building covers an area over 1700 m^{2}, using classical Baroque architecture with European and Oriental influences. The flooring, staircases and halls were European-styled, while the roof was Oriental-inspired. Surrounding the palace is a trapezoid-shaped flower garden, with 4 pathways.

The front face of the roof is decorated with grotesques. Other exterior structural designs include symbolic chickens representing daytime and owls for nighttime and ring-enclosed white flowers. Many other motifs embossed on the roof is a combination of Greek mythological symbols, iconic plants and tropical animals such as lizards and birds flying or expanding its wings.

Diệm commissioned the construction of three extremely deep tunnels leading from the palace to other parts of the city so that he and important government officials/military figures could escape in the event of a coup. During the 1963 coup d'état, Diệm is widely believed to have used one of these escape routes to escape the siege on the palace, which caused considerable damage. He fled to a supporter's house in Cholon but was captured and executed a day later. The successor presidents still worked there until the completion of re-built Independence Palace, in 1966. The tunnels were 2.2 m high, with cast reinforced concrete (170 kg of iron / 1 m^{3} of concrete). Walls were 1 m thick, with 6 iron vault doors for entry and exit. The tunnels had 2 downward stairs, leading to a basement with 6 rooms totalling 1392.3 m^{2}, which included conference rooms, offices, bathrooms, electrical rooms. The Presidential Office and Presidential Adviser's Offices were equipped with battery banks for uninterruptible power supply, portable radios, RCA transceivers. There are two exit tunnels that run towards Le Thanh Ton Street as well as six ventilation holes and numerous sewage drainages.

== See also ==
- Tonkin Palace
