= 1960 in South Vietnam =

- Decades: 1950s; 1960s; 1970s
- See also: Other events of 1960; Timeline of Vietnamese history

The following events happened in South Vietnam in the year 1960.

== Events ==
=== December ===
- December 20 - The National Liberation Front (NLF) was created as a Communist political organization in South Vietnam, to oppose the government of President Ngo Dinh Diem, who gave the group the nickname "Viet Cong". As the NLF gained adherents, it began carrying out military attacks against the South Vietnamese Army, and against U.S. forces during the Vietnam War.
