= Nguyễn Văn Lực =

Vietnamese politician

Nguyễn Văn Lực was a Vietnamese Lieutenant Commander and leader of the Viet Nam Quoc Dan Dang (VNQDD, Vietnamese: Vietnamese Nationalist Party), which opposed the Ngo Dinh Diem regime. At one point in 1960, Diem had jailed Luc for one month for engaging in "anti-government activities". Luc's son was Second Lieutenant Nguyễn Văn Cử, a dissident Republic of Vietnam Air Force pilot who along with First Lieutenant Phạm Phú Quốc coordinated the 1962 South Vietnamese Independence Palace bombing in Saigon on February 27, 1962. Luc had a reputation for brutality and was once reported to have killed a small child in cold blood by a river during a training exercise.
