= 1963 in South Vietnam =

- Decades: 1950s; 1960s; 1970s
- See also: Other events of 1963; Timeline of Vietnamese history

The following lists events that happened during 1963 in South Vietnam.

== Events ==
=== September ===
- September 27 - Parliamentary elections were held with President Ngo Dinh Diem winning 120 out of the 123 seats.
