= Nguyễn Thành Trung (pilot) =

Vietnamese military and civilian aviator (born 1947)

Captain Nguyễn Thành Trung
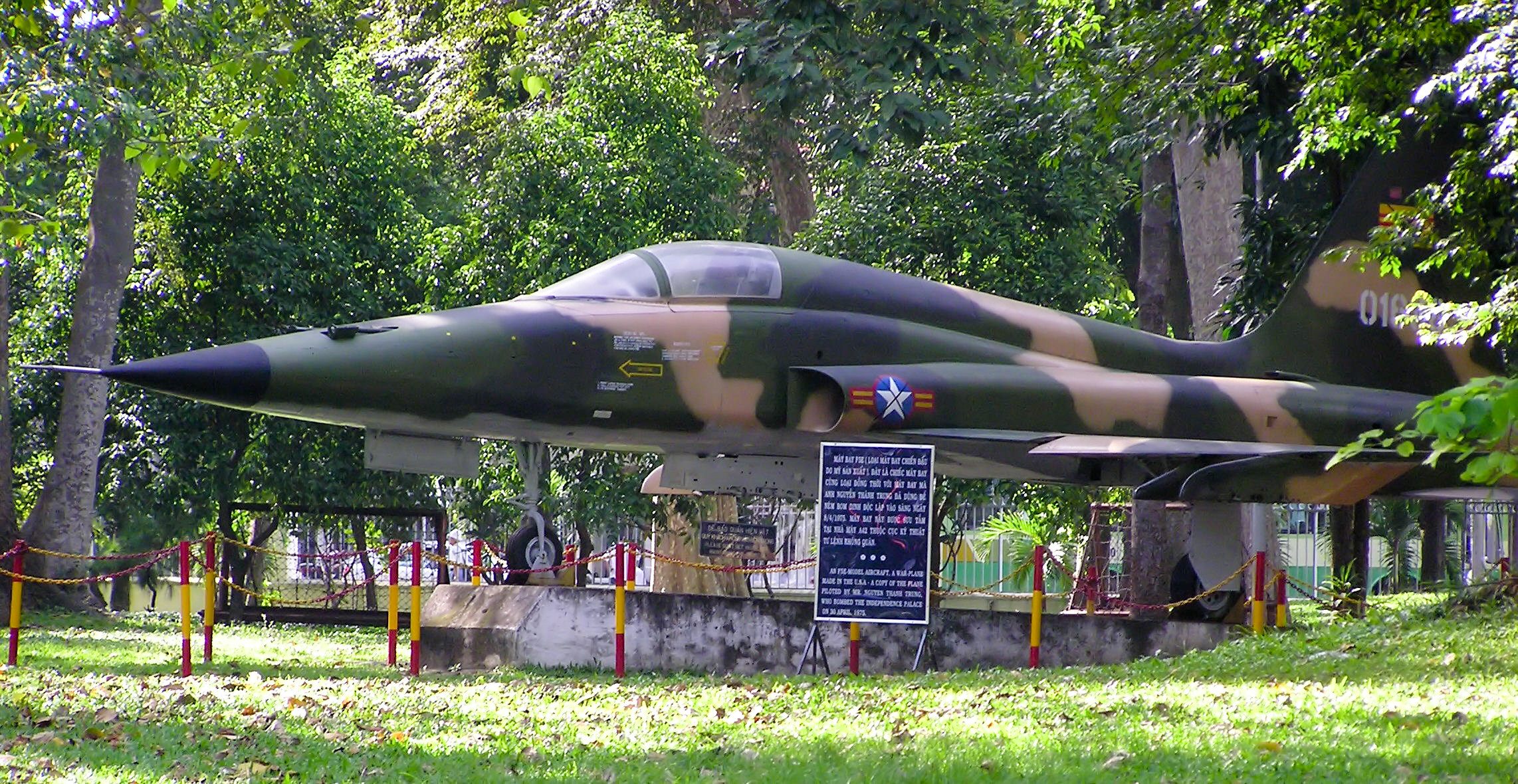
- Trung's F-5E on display in Reunification Palace at Ho Chi Minh City with the plaque on the left bottom side of the Aircraft detailing Trung's Action that attacked the Palace on April 8, 1975
- Born: October 9, 1947 (age 79); Châu Thành District, Bến Tre Province, French Indochina
- Children: 6
- Relatives: Nguyen Tran Kien (grandson), Nguyen Tran Linh Dan (granddaughter)
- Military career
- Allegiance: North Vietnam 1969–1975; South Vietnam 1969–1975 (cover)
- Branch: South Vietnam Air Force (1969–1975); Vietnam People's Air Force (1975–1990)
- Rank: First Lieutenant (VNAF); Senior Colonel (VPAF)
- Awards: Hero of the People's Armed Forces

Nguyễn Thành Trung (born 1947) is a Vietnamese military and civilian aviator. Trung fought during the Vietnam War and later became an executive of Vietnam Airlines.

== Biography ==
=== Military service ===
Trung was born in Châu Thành District, Bến Tre Province in 1947. Trung's father was a local politician who eventually rose to be deputy secretary of Chau Thanh's communist party. In 1954 Vietnam was partitioned into North and South Vietnam, leading to the ruling parties of both nations conducting a purge of their political enemies. As part of these purges, in 1963 the South Vietnamese commandos killed Trung's father and arrested his mother; the rest of the family were subjected to intimidation and had their homes burned. After this event, Trung adopted the surname Nguyễn to avoid further reprisals. According to his later accounts, the death of his father left Trung with a seething hatred of the South Vietnamese government.

Trung enrolled in Saigon University of Science in 1965, pursuing three bachelor's degrees. He also became tangentially involved with Viet Cong activity in Saigon at that time. Trung was continuing his education when in 1968 the Tet Offensive occurred, disrupting Saigon and causing South Vietnam to increase conscription requirements. The South Vietnam Air Force (VNAF) was particularly interested in recruiting college students into the air force; according to Vietnamese records, this requirement spurred the North Vietnamese to recruit left-leaning college students into the Communist Party of Vietnam in the hope they could be used to infiltrate the VNAF. Trung became one of the students recruited by the North Vietnamese, being officially inducted into the Communist Party the day before he volunteered for service with the VNAF in 1969.

Upon entering air force service, Trung trained for two years in Nha Trang before being sent by the VNAF to train in the United States, including a two year long stay in Texas. He proved to be a well-regarded pilot, ranking 2nd out of a class of 40 VNAF officers sent to train in the United States. While in the US, Trung was able to remain in contact with his North Vietnamese handlers, successfully recording technical information on American aircraft and tactics in personal correspondence he mailed back to Vietnam.

By 1975 Trung had returned to Vietnam and was conducting training missions with newer pilots, holding the rank of first lieutenant and commanding a squadron of ground attack aircraft. The South Vietnamese military situation continued to deteriorate, with North Vietnamese and Viet Cong forces advancing on Saigon in April 1975. However, in early April a South Vietnamese counterattack captured a North Vietnamese Intelligence officer who revealed that several North Vietnamese agents were operating around Saigon, including an unnamed officer - Trung - in Bến Tre. Fearing that Trung's identity would be uncovered, his handlers ordered him to stage his defection, preferably with an aircraft but on foot if necessary.

On the morning of 8 April, Trung and his squadron were preparing a sortie against advancing North Vietnamese forces - all aircraft in the squadron were armed with four 250-kilogram (550 lb) bombs. According to Trung's account, during takeoff he spread confusion by indicating to his squadron (who per VNAF protocols operated under radio silence during takeoff, instead communicating by hand signals) he was encountering mechanical issues while indicating to Bến Tre's ground control that he was taking the rear position in his squadron. After departing Bến Tre, Trung flew his Northrop F-5 towards Saigon and dropped his payload on Independence Palace, the South Vietnamese presidential residence, striking the building with all four bombs but causing only minor damage. He later destroyed a fuel depot before landing at a nearby airstrip, disarming his aircraft's 20mm cannon in preparation for a crash landing, and then flying towards North Vietnamese lines, successfully landing his aircraft (albeit with some damage) at an airfield in Phước Long. Following his landing, Trung was congratulated by North Vietnamese officials and granted the rank of lieutenant in the Vietnam People's Air Force (VPAF). Trung's bombing of Independence Palace had caused only minor damage, but his actions were celebrated in North Vietnam, was widely covered in Western media, and constituted a major blow to South Vietnamese morale.

In the days after his defection, Trung was transferred to Đà Nẵng and ordered to evaluate the condition of captured VNAF aircraft. For the rest of April, Trung worked to instruct North Vietnamese pilots (most of whom had been trained to fly on Soviet instruments) on how to pilot captured A-37 Dragonflies. By the end of the month, Trung was placed in command of the VPAF's Quyết Thắng (Victory) squadron, a military force consisting of VNAF defectors and re-trained VPAF pilots flying captured South Vietnamese and American aircraft. On 28 April, the squadron launched a highly successful airstrike on Tan Son Nhut Air Base, during which Trung was second in command and piloted the lead aircraft. The strike caused relatively minor damage, but also caused remnants of the VNAF to evacuate many of its remaining aircraft to Thailand. In addition, the attack was a major factor in the United States deciding to scrap its planned evacuation of Saigon via fixed wing aircraft in favor of using helicopters in Operation Frequent Wind. For his actions during the war, Trung was granted the rank of Captain of the Liberation. Trung would later remark that he was happy his actions had contributed to the end of the war.

Following the end of the Vietnam War, Trung remained in military service. He flew transport and bomber aircraft during the Vietnamese military intervention in Cambodia.

=== Civilian ===
Trung served in the VPAF until 1990, when he became a pilot for Vietnam Airlines, the flag carrier for Vietnam, eventually serving as vice president of the airline. Trung was a supporter of Vietnam Airlines purchasing American aircraft and became the first Vietnamese pilot to be certified to fly a Boeing 777. In 2005, Trung piloted a Vietnam Airlines 777 carrying Vietnamese President Trần Đức Lương to the United States for an 11-day diplomatic tour. During the trip, Trung expressed a desire for closer ties between the American and Vietnamese aviation industries. Before retiring from Vietnam Airlines, Trung was appointed as the Airline Deputy General Director.

Two of Trung's daughters work for Vietnam Airlines as Flight Attendant, with one becoming a flight instructor. Trung's son also work for Vietnam Airlines as a Pilot and has reached the rank of Captain.
