= Nguyễn Văn Cử =

Nguyễn Văn Cử (born c. 1934, Vietnam) was a lieutenant in the South Vietnamese air force, best known for being one of two mutinous pilots involved in the 1962 South Vietnamese Presidential Palace bombing on 27 February 1962, which aimed to assassinate South Vietnam's President Ngô Đình Diệm and his immediate family, who were his political advisers.

== Biography ==
Cử was the second son of Nguyễn Văn Lực, a leader of Việt Nam Quốc Dân Đảng (VNQDD), a nationalist party which opposed the regime of Diệm. Cử was trained in the United States as a pilot, and had not been promoted for six years, which he felt was due to his father’s opposition to Diệm, who had him briefly jailed for "antigovernment activities."

Cử felt that Diệm was not focused enough on fighting the Vietcong, but was preoccupied with maintaining power. He criticised the Americans for their support for Diệm, which he felt had stifled the war effort, saying "I felt that the Americans had slammed the door on those of us who really wanted the fight against the Communists."

They had planned for Cử, and Phạm Phú Quốc, who he had recruited from his squadron, to attack the Independence Palace (Dinh Độc Lập) on 27 February. Cử had persuaded Quốc by claiming that all the armed services and the United States were aware of the plot, showing him a Newsweek article critical of Diệm.

== Attack ==
Quốc and Cử were scheduled to fly on an early morning mission into the Mekong Delta to attack the Vietcong, but turned around to attack the palace. The French colonial-era palace was in flames as their two fighter aircraft, World War II model AD-6s, supplied by the United States, dropped bombs and napalm. Several rockets as well as machine gun fire were fired at the compound. The assault ended within an hour, but the pilots did not empty their full load, which would have been sufficient to level the palace. On a cloudy day, they flew at low altitudes of around 150 metres (500 ft), completing cycles before ascending above the clouds. Diệm and his family escaped unhurt, with three servants killed and thirty injured.

Quốc's plane was damaged by fire; he ejected over the Saigon River and landed in Nhà Bè. Cử managed to reach Cambodia safely, believing his attack had been successful. As a result, he gave reporters a press conference, telling them of the military's hate for Diệm and his regime. Initially arrested by the police, Cử remained in exile in Cambodia where he worked as a language teacher. After Diệm's assassination in November 1963, Cử returned from exile and resumed his service in the Air Force. In June 1975, after the Communists' victory in the Vietnam War, Cử was arrested and sent to a re-education camp for ten years until his release in 1985. He immigrated to the United States in 1991.
