= Symbolic chickens =

Depictions of chicken used as political and non political symbols

A rooster pictured in the coat of arms of Laitila, a town in Finland

Chickens have been widely used as national symbols, and as mascots for clubs, businesses, and other associations.

- The chicken is a national symbol of France and is used as an (unofficial) national mascot, in particular for sports teams. See also: Gallic rooster.
- The Rhodesia (now Zimbabwe) independent party ZANU party used a chicken as a symbol, since a majority of Rhodesian citizens (mostly native African black) were analphabetic due to lack of school funding for the poor, so they use symbol or mascot to identify their political party.
- The standard of Sir Robin from Monty Python and the Holy Grail is a chicken.
- The town of Denizli in Republic of Turkey is symbolized by a chicken.
- The town of Gallarate in Italy has two roosters in its coat of arms (in Italian, the word "gallo" is used both for "Gallic" and for "rooster"). Other neighboring towns have a similar coat of arms, but without roosters (e.g. Busto Arsizio).
- The mascot of the English Premiership team Tottenham Hotspur is a cockerel.
- Sydney Roosters Australian rugby league team
- The North Adelaide Football Club are also nicknamed the Roosters.
- The Rhode Island Red is the state bird of Rhode Island.
- Pathé corporate logo
- The athletic teams of the University of South Carolina "The USC" (the original USC) use the Gamecock (the fighting cock) as mascot and use the "Gamecocks" as their moniker.
- Clube Atlético Mineiro, a soccer team in the Brazilian League has a rooster for mascot and is nicknamed "Galo" (Rooster).
- Fighting Cock brand of Bourbon uses a mean rooster as their trademark.
- The State Bird of Delaware is the Blue Hen, as well being the Mascot for the University of Delaware sports teams.
- Packets of the popular cereal Cornflakes from Kellogg's prominently feature a cockerel.
- The Big Chicken of Marietta, Georgia houses a Kentucky Fried Chicken location, and is used as a navigational aid for local military pilots.
- Hector Chicken is the eponymous bird who gives his name to the fast food restaurant chain in Belgium and France.
- Le Coq Sportif or "the athletic rooster" is a French sports equipment manufacturer.
- The close-up of a chicken as an Emoji (U+1F414)
