= Independence Palace =

Historic landmark in Ho Chi Minh City, Vietnam

Coordinates: 10°46′37″N 106°41′43″E

- Dinh Độc Lập

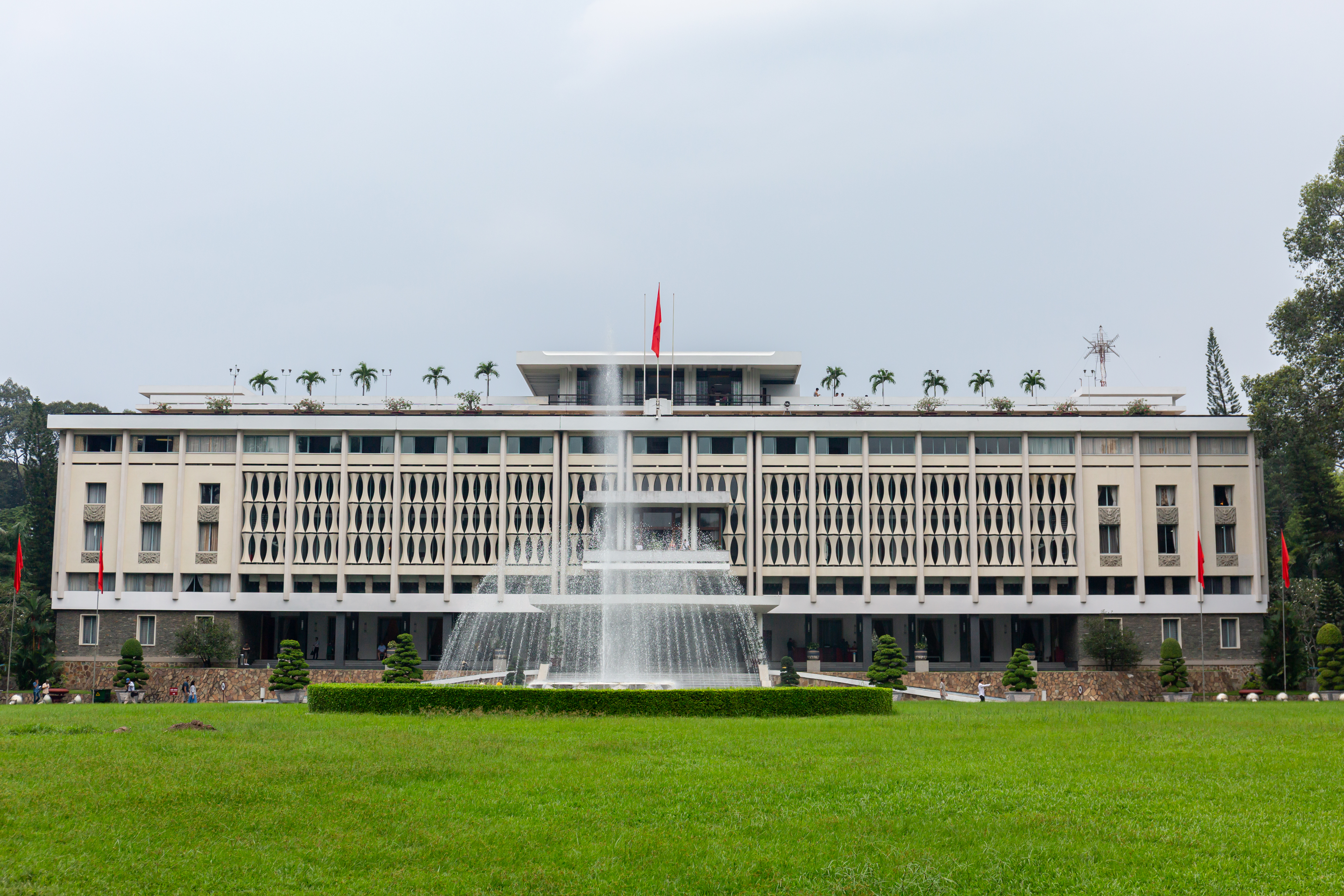
- View of the palace in 2019
- Former names: Norodom Palace
- Alternative names: Reunification Hall (Hội trường Thống Nhất)

General information
- Type: Presidential Palace; Convention center (present)
- Architectural style: Vietnamese modernist
- Location: 135 Nam Kỳ Khởi Nghĩa Street, Bến Thành, Ho Chi Minh City, Vietnam
- Construction started: 1 July 1962
- Completed: 31 October 1966
- Owner: Government Office

Height
- Height: 26 m

Technical details
- Floor count: 4
- Floor area: 120,000 sq m

Design and construction
- Architect: Ngô Viết Thụ
- Civil engineer: Phan Văn Điển

Other information
- Public transit: L1 Opera House station L2 Tao Đàn station (Under construction); L4 Turtle Lake station (proposed)

Website
- https://independencepalace.gov.vn/

The Independence Palace (Vietnamese: Dinh Độc Lập), also publicly and officially known as the Reunification Convention Hall or simply Reunification Hall (Vietnamese: Hội trường Thống Nhất), is a historic landmark and government-owned public hall in Ho Chi Minh City (formerly known as Saigon), Vietnam. It was designed by architect Ngô Viết Thụ and was the presidential palace, home and workplace of the president of the Republic of Vietnam (South Vietnam). It was also the site of the Fall of Saigon on 30 April 1975 that ended the Vietnam War, when a Liberation Army of South Vietnam tank crashed through its gates.

After the reunification of Vietnam, the building continued to serve as a government and presidential office until 1976 when the capital of South Vietnam was officially moved to Hanoi, and the government's functions were relocated. The palace is now preserved as a convention hall for state events, and also as a museum that is open to the public, and is a popular tourist attraction in Ho Chi Minh City.

== History ==
=== Republic of Vietnam ===
Construction of the current Independence Palace was ordered by President Ngô Đình Diệm in 1962 to replace the old palace, which was badly damaged due to being bombed by two dissident Republic of Vietnam Air Force pilots. It was constructed according to a design by Ngô Viết Thụ, a Vietnamese architect who won the First Grand Prize of Rome (Grand Prix de Rome) in 1955, the highest recognition of the Beaux-Arts school in Paris. He was also a laureate of the Prix de Rome awarded by the French government.

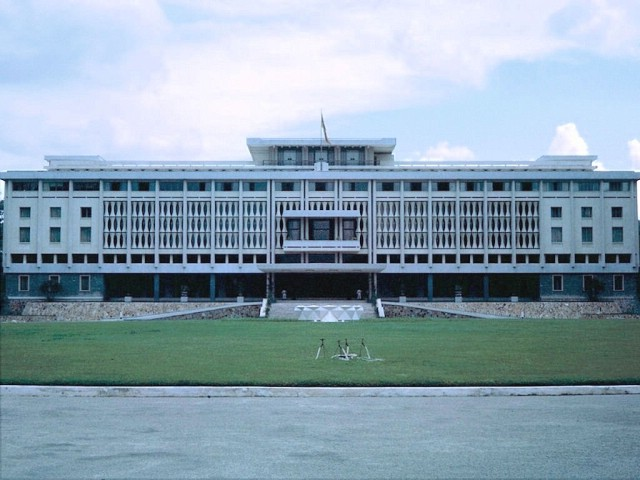
Independence Palace in 1967

The construction of the palace started on 1 July 1962. Meanwhile, Diệm and his ruling family moved to Gia Long Palace (today the Museum of Ho Chi Minh City). However, Diệm did not see the completed hall as he and his brother, also his chief adviser, Ngô Đình Nhu were assassinated after a coup d'état led by General Dương Văn Minh in November 1963. The completed hall was inaugurated on 31 October 1966 by the chairman of the National Leadership Committee, General Nguyễn Văn Thiệu, who was then the head of a military junta. The Independence Hall served as Thiệu's home and office from October 1967 to 21 April 1975, when he fled the country as communist North Vietnamese forces swept southwards in the decisive Ho Chi Minh Campaign.

On 8 April 1975, Nguyễn Thanh Trung, a pilot of the South Vietnamese air force and an undetected communist spy flew an F-5E aircraft from Biên Hòa Air Base to bomb the palace but caused no significant damage. At 10:45 on 30 April 1975, a tank of the North Vietnamese army bulldozed through the main gate, effectively ending the Vietnam War.

=== Socialist Republic of Vietnam ===
In November 1975, after the negotiation convention between the communist North Vietnam and their colleagues in South Vietnam was completed, the Provisional Revolutionary Government renamed the palace Reunification Hall (Hội trường Thống Nhất) for the government-owned public hall, while the Independence Palace (Dinh Độc Lập) still used as a historic site for tourism.

The palace is depicted on the 200-đồng note of South Vietnam.

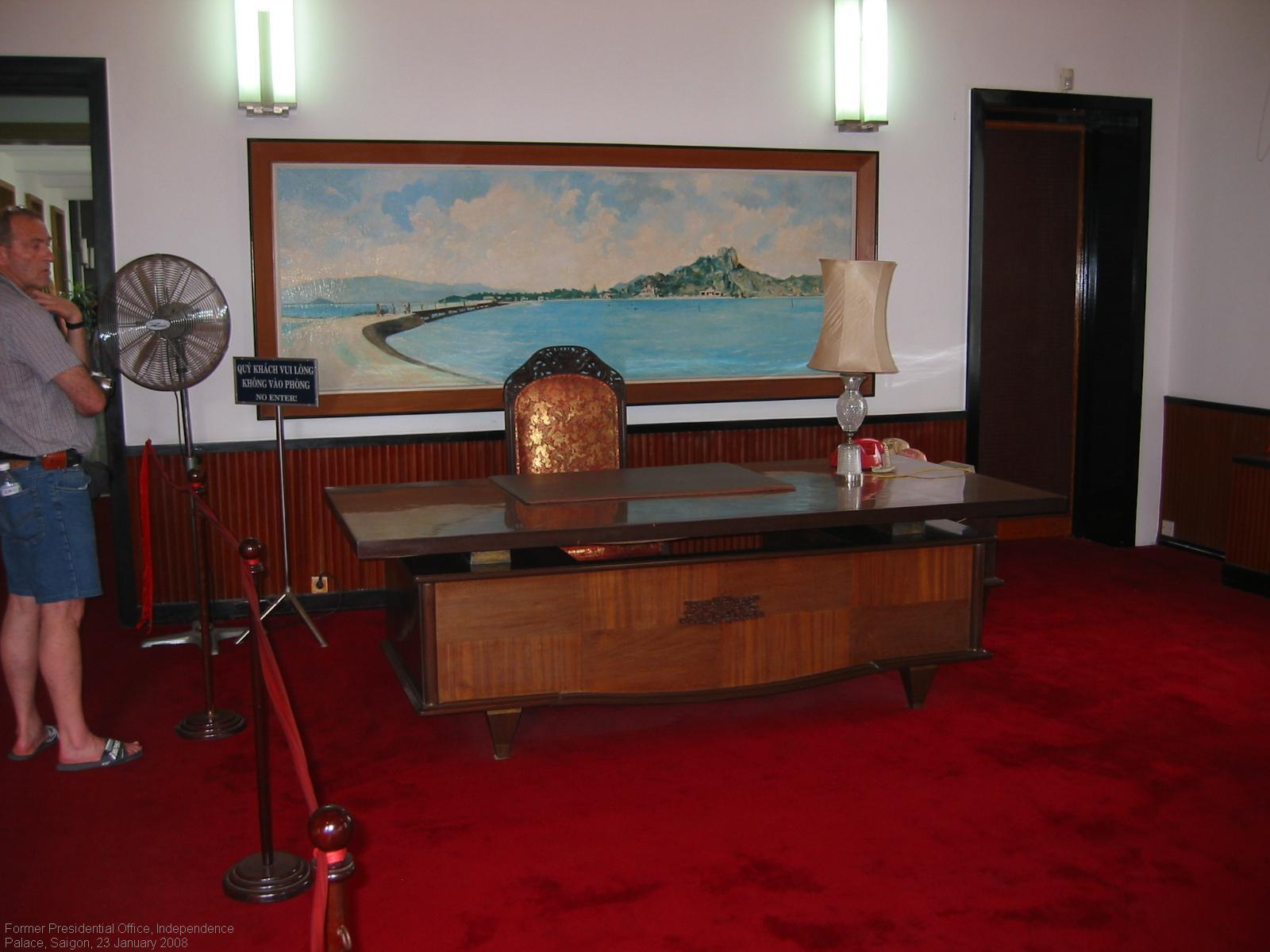
President's Office in the Hall

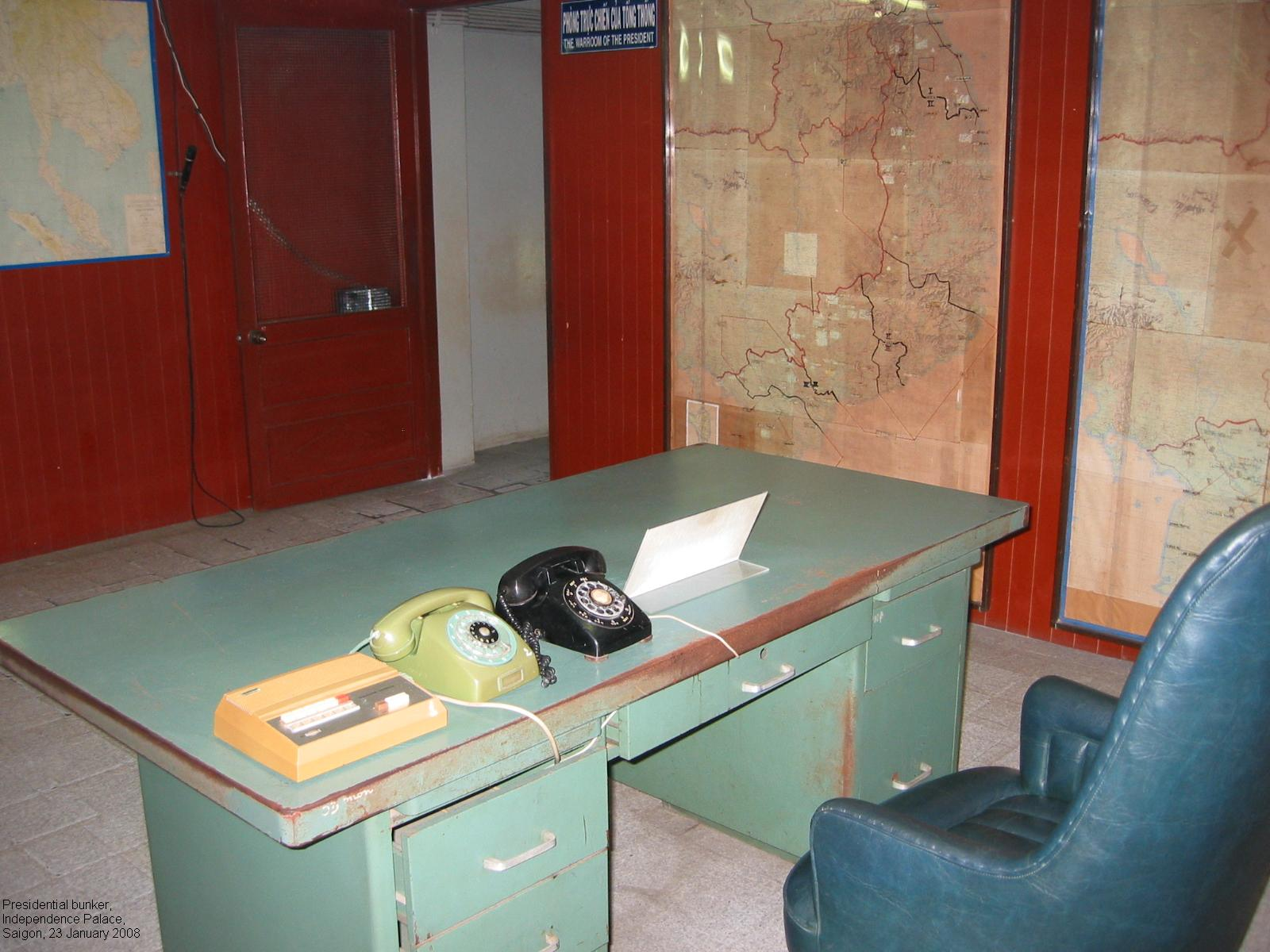
The old war room underneath the palace

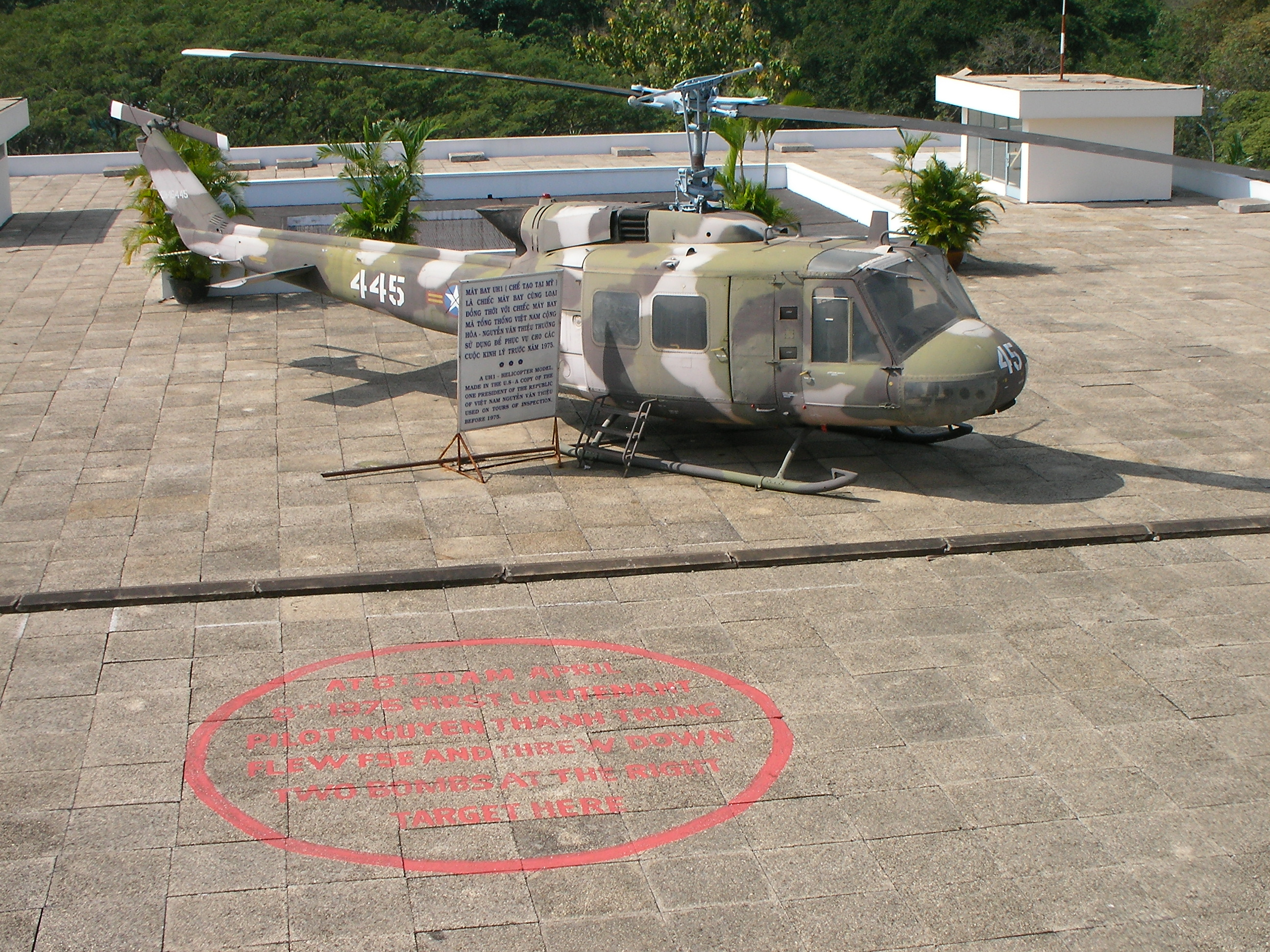
Roof of Reunification Palace

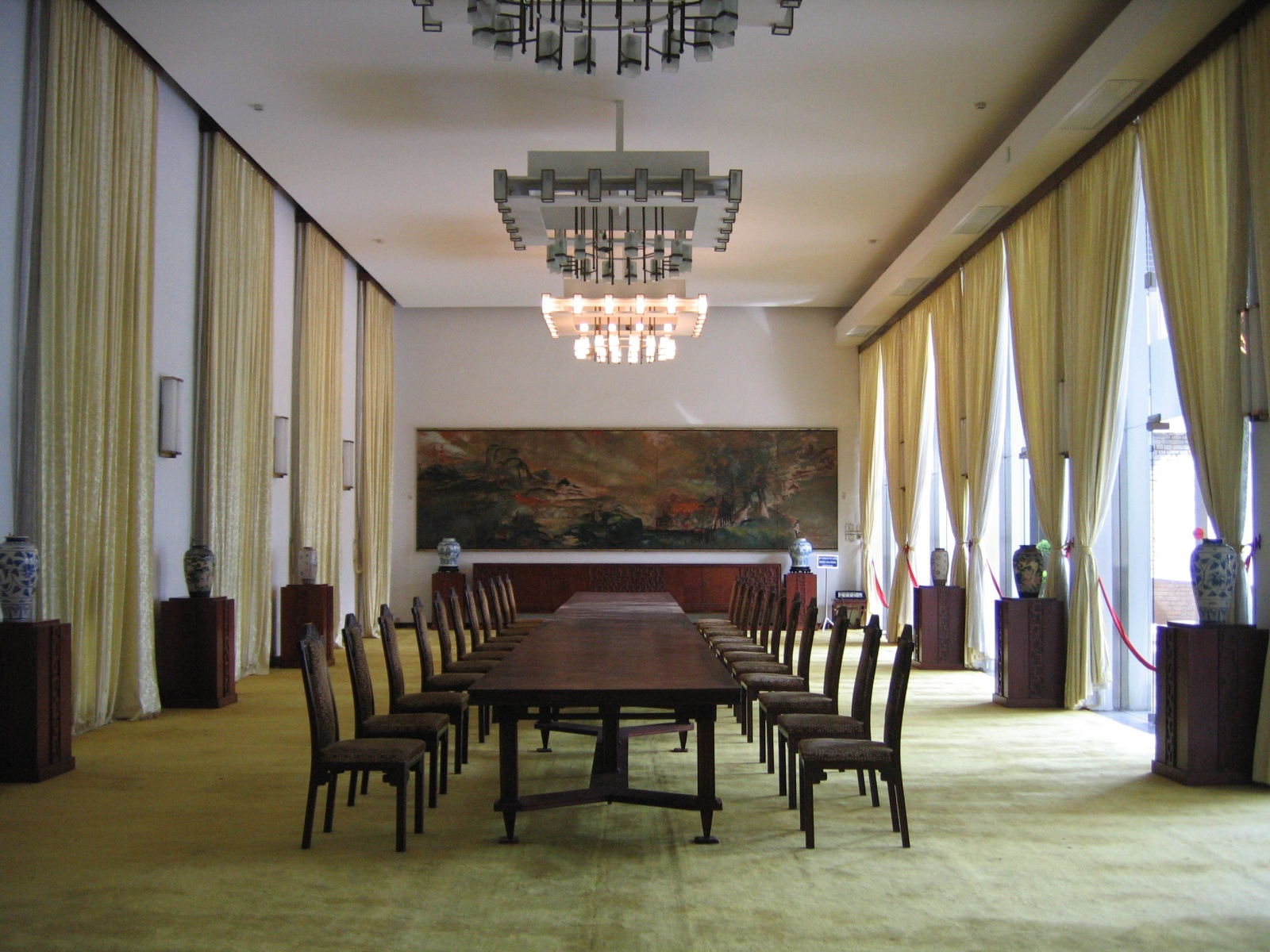
The Banquet Chamber in the Independence Hall

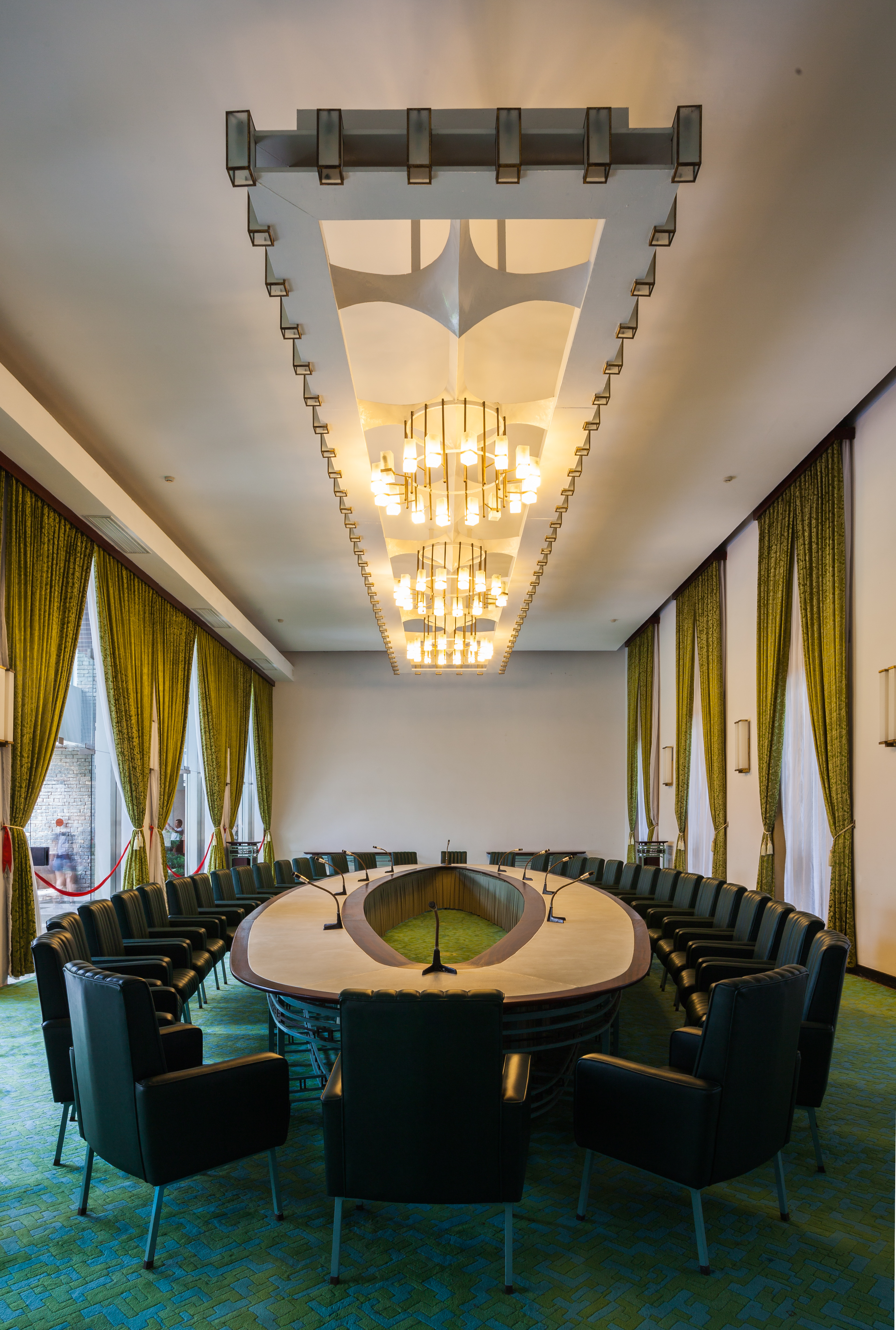
Ministers' cabinet room

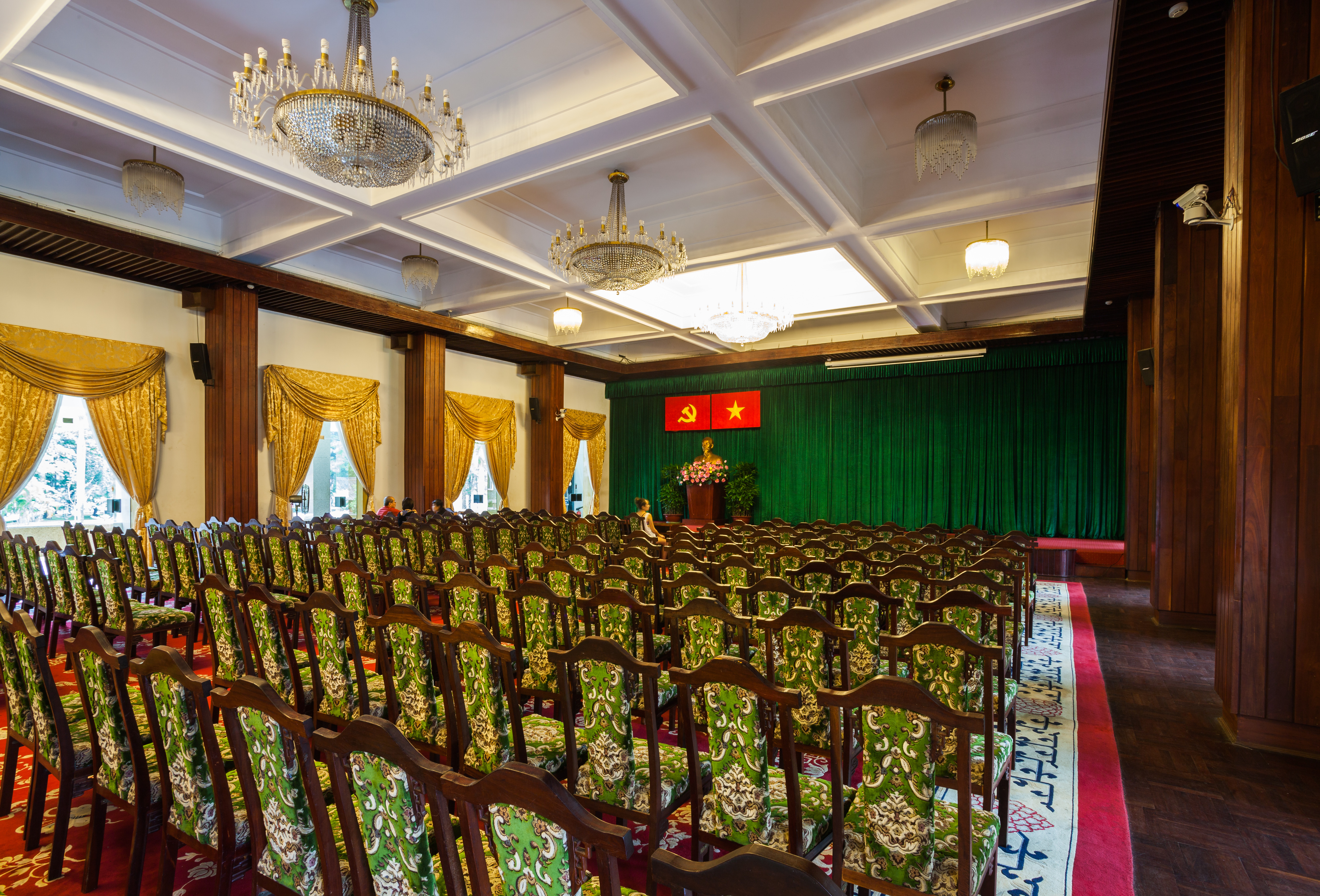
Conference hall

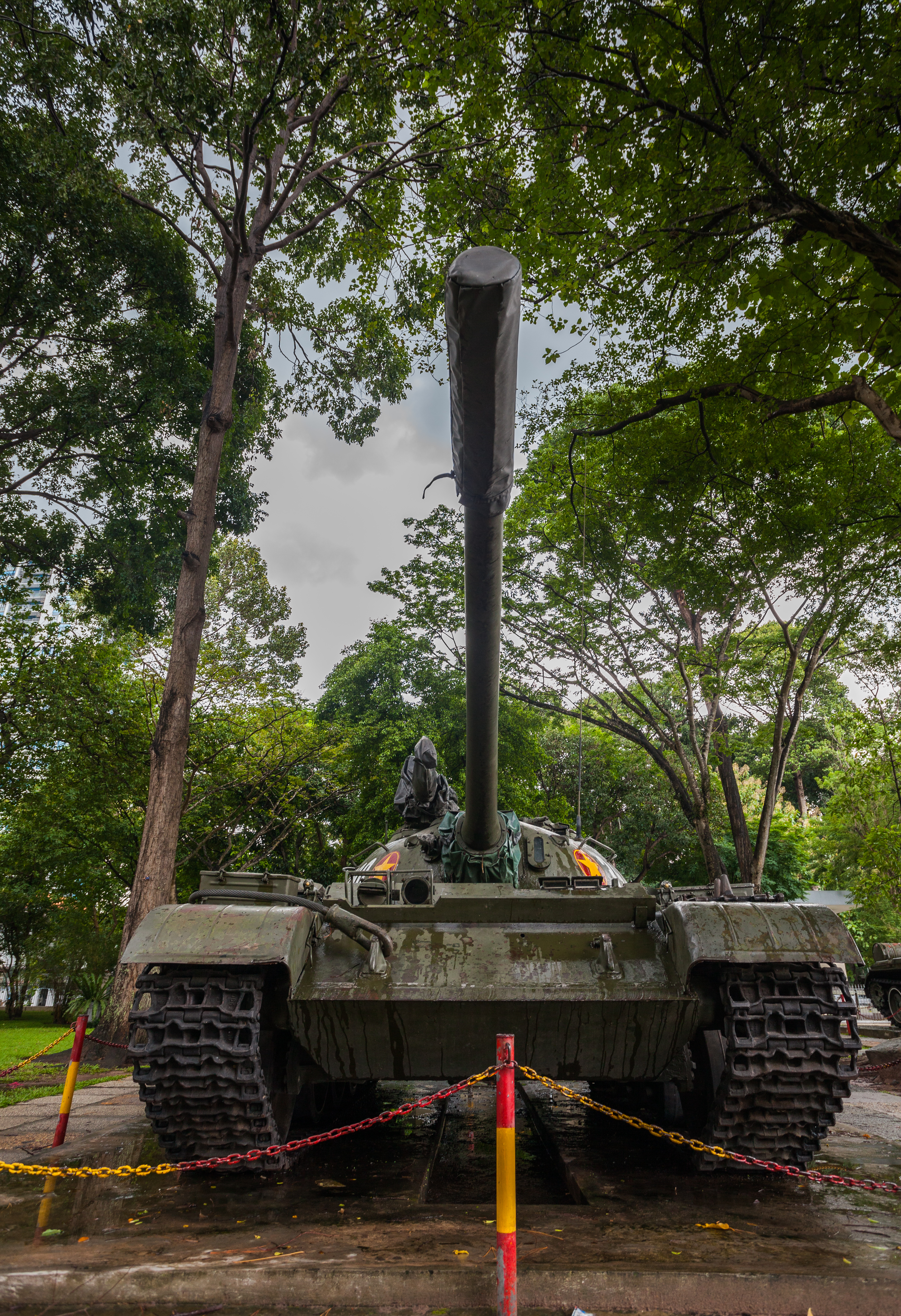
Vietnamese T-54 tank in the gardens at the entrance of the palace
