= Phạm Phú Quốc =

- Born: October 20, 1935; Da Nang, Indochinese Federation
- Died: April 19, 1965 (aged 29); Hà Tĩnh Province, North Vietnam
- Military career
- Allegiance: South Vietnam
- Branch: Republic of Vietnam Air Force
- Service years: 1954–1965
- Rank: Colonel (posthumously)
- Unit: 23rd Tactical Air Wing
- Commands: 23rd Tactical Air Squadron; Bien Hoa Air Base
- Conflicts: Vietnam War

Phạm Phú Quốc (October 20, 1935 – April 19, 1965) was a French-trained South Vietnamese fighter pilot and lieutenant in the Republic of Vietnam Air Force, best known for being one of two mutinous pilots involved in the 1962 South Vietnamese Presidential Palace bombing on February 27, 1962, which aimed to assassinate President Ngô Đình Diệm and his immediate family, who were his political advisers.

His plan failed, and he was imprisoned until 1963, after Diệm's assassination. The coup plotters released him and reinstated his rank.

== Early life ==
Quốc was born on October 20, 1935, in Da Nang in a well-to-do family. According to genealogy, he is a descendant of a minister during the reign of Emperor Tự Đức.

As a child, he attended primary school in Da Nang. When he went to high school, his family sent him back to Saigon to study at Chasseloup-Laubat Public School. His passion for aviation developed when he was a student. He used the pocket money provided by his family to buy technical books on how to build small planes from France. He assembled and flew model airplanes at Tan Son Nhat Airport.

In 1954, he graduated from high school with a full Baccalauréat. After that, his family planned to let him go to France to continue his education, but because he was so interested in airplanes, he asked his parents to let him join the military.

== Military career ==
On June 15, 1954, he volunteered to join the Air Force. He was sent to train at the French Air Force Officer Training School in Marrakesh, Morocco. In early April 1955, he finished his graduation with the rank of first lieutenant. Returning to South Vietnam, he served in the Vietnamese National Army and was stationed at Bien Hoa Air Base.

In November 1957, after more than a year serving in the Army of the Republic of Vietnam, he was promoted to second lieutenant. In early 1961, he was sent to study in the United States, to learn and fly the new generation aircraft of the United States Air Force for six months. On October 26, 1961, he was promoted to lieutenant and was appointed Chief of Operations of the 514th Fighter Squadron of the South Vietnamese Air Force in Bien Hoa.

=== 1962 Independence Palace bombing ===
During President Ngô Đình Diệm's regime, political dissent intensified. As a result, on February 27, 1962, Quốc and his wingmate Nguyễn Văn Cử, who were flying A-1 Skyraiders, turned away from their routine military operation and headed to Saigon, where they bombed the Independence Palace, which resulted in the knocking down a corner of the palace. However, President Diệm and his family managed to escape death. Quốc's plane was hit by the anti-aircraft fire over Bạch Đằng River and he was forced to land on the Saigon River, near a security post in the Nha Be gas depot. He was arrested and imprisoned at Chi Hoa Prison, while Nguyễn Văn Cử escaped to Cambodia and took refuge there.

=== Rehabilitation ===
On November 1, 1963, a military coup broke out, which resulted in the overthrow of Ngô Đình Diệm. As a result, Quốc was released from prison and his rank restored. At the beginning of December, he was promoted to the rank of captain. After that, he was sent to study at the Air Ground Operation School in Okinawa, Japan, for a period of six months.

At the beginning of February 1964, he was promoted to major, holding the position of Deputy Commander of 514th Fighter Squadron under the 23rd Air Wing. At the end of the year, he was promoted to hold the position. In early 1965, he was promoted to lieutenant colonel and was appointed commander of the 23rd Tactical Squadron and Bien Hoa Air Base.

== Death ==
On April 19, 1965, he and his wingmen carried out a mission to coordinate with the U.S. Air Force to destroy the traffic axis 10 kilometers south of Vinh. After completing the mission on the way back, his squadron encountered enemy air defenses. His plane was shot down and it crashed in the sky of Hà Tĩnh, resulting in his death.

A memorial service for him was held by the South Vietnamese Air Force Command and the 23rd Tactical Air Force Command. He was posthumously promoted to the rank of colonel. Quốc was also posthumously awarded the National Order of Vietnam, 5th class and Gallantry Cross. His remains were initially buried by local people. It was not until 1997 that his body was brought back from Hà Tĩnh by his biological sister, and reburied in Hoi An.

After his death, the popular songwriter Phạm Duy wrote a song to eulogise him named "Huyền Sử Ca Một Người Mang Tên Quốc" ("Epic of a Man Named Quốc") in which he was portrayed as a heroic, selfless, fearless and honourable figure. The primary example of this were the lines "Thần phong hiên ngang mà chẳng sợ gì" (A godly wind that knows nothing to fear!). Coincidentally, the words "Thần phong" also mean "kamikaze" in Vietnamese, possibly referring to Quốc's role in the 1962 attack.

== Personal life ==
On the day he died in battle, Quốc's wife was 3 months pregnant with their first son. Before 1975, she and her son had migrated to the US. Quốc's son, Phạm Phú Phi is currently a doctor of cosmetology in the United States.

== Awards and decorations ==
| National Order of Vietnam (5th class) |
| Military Merit Medal |
| Vietnamese Gallantry Cross with Gold Star |
| Vietnamese Gallantry Cross with Silver Star |
| Vietnamese Gallantry Cross with Bronze Star |
| Air Gallantry Cross with gold wings |
| Vietnam Air Service Medal, Second class |

- Commendation of merit (12 times) and many other commendations
