= 1961 in Vietnam =

- Decades: 1940s; 1950s; 1960s; 1970s; 1980s
- See also: Other events of 1961; History of Vietnam; Timeline of Vietnamese history; List of years in Vietnam

The following lists events that happened during 1961 in Vietnam.

== Events ==
=== January ===
- January 29 - Radio Hanoi announced in an English-language broadcast that the National Liberation Front of South Vietnam, popularly known as the Viet Cong, had been formed to overthrow the government there and to establish a regime similar to that in Communist North Vietnam.
- January 30 - President of the United States John F. Kennedy approved a $41 million counterinsurgency plan in North Vietnam, drawn up for President Eisenhower by General Edward Lansdale, to help the government of South Vietnam resist communist aggression. Designed to add 52,000 men to that nation's army and civil guards, the plan included provisions for American soldiers and military advisers to assist in the effort.

=== February ===
- February 28 - Under United States law, 38 U.S.C. §101 (29)(A), the Vietnam Era refers to "The period beginning on February 28, 1961, and ending on May 7, 1975, in the case of a veteran who served in the Republic of Vietnam during that period."

=== March ===
- March 23 - An American C-47 transport plane with eight men aboard disappeared over the war-torn nation of Laos after taking off from Vientiane toward Saigon. The U.S. Air Force did not announce the incident until two days later. The sole survivor, Major Lawrence R. Bailey, Jr., was captured and became the first American POW of the Vietnam Era. He would be released on August 15, 1962.

=== August ===
- August 10 - The first chemical defoliation operation in Vietnam was carried out as a Sikorsky H-34 helicopter sprayed the herbicide Dinoxol north of Kon Tum. Following the successful test, Operation Ranch Hand continued until October 23, 1971, destroying 7.7 million acres (31,000 km^{2}) of forests and jungles.

=== September ===
- September 18 - For the first time, troops from North Vietnam seized control of a provincial capital in South Vietnam, capturing Phuoc Vinh in a predawn attack, only 55 miles from Saigon. The ARVN recaptured the city the next day, but not before the Governor of the Phuoc Thanh province was publicly beheaded, along with the top military officers, and the government buildings burned.

=== October ===
- October 11 - The United States presence in South Vietnam was increased as President Kennedy authorized the deployment of an entire U.S. Air Force unit, the 4400th Combat Crew Training Squadron, to fly combat missions from the Bien Hoa Air Base.

=== November ===
- November 3 - After returning from South Vietnam on a factfinding mission for President Kennedy, U.S. Army General Maxwell Taylor submitted a report proposing the commitment of 10,000 American combat troops to defend against the Communist Viet Cong. Kennedy did not publicly commit reports, but eventually sent 25,000 troops to South Vietnam.

=== December ===
- December 11 - The Vietnam War officially began for the United States, as the USS Core arrived at Saigon Harbor. The ship brought in two helicopter units, the 8th Transportation Company from Fort Bragg and the 57th Transportation Company from Fort Lewis, with 33 H-21 Shawnee helicopters, and 400 U.S. Army personnel.
