= 1962 South Vietnamese Independence Palace bombing =

Assassination attempt on the president

Coordinates: 10°46′37″N 106°41′43″E

- Part of the War in Vietnam (1959–1963) in the Vietnam War
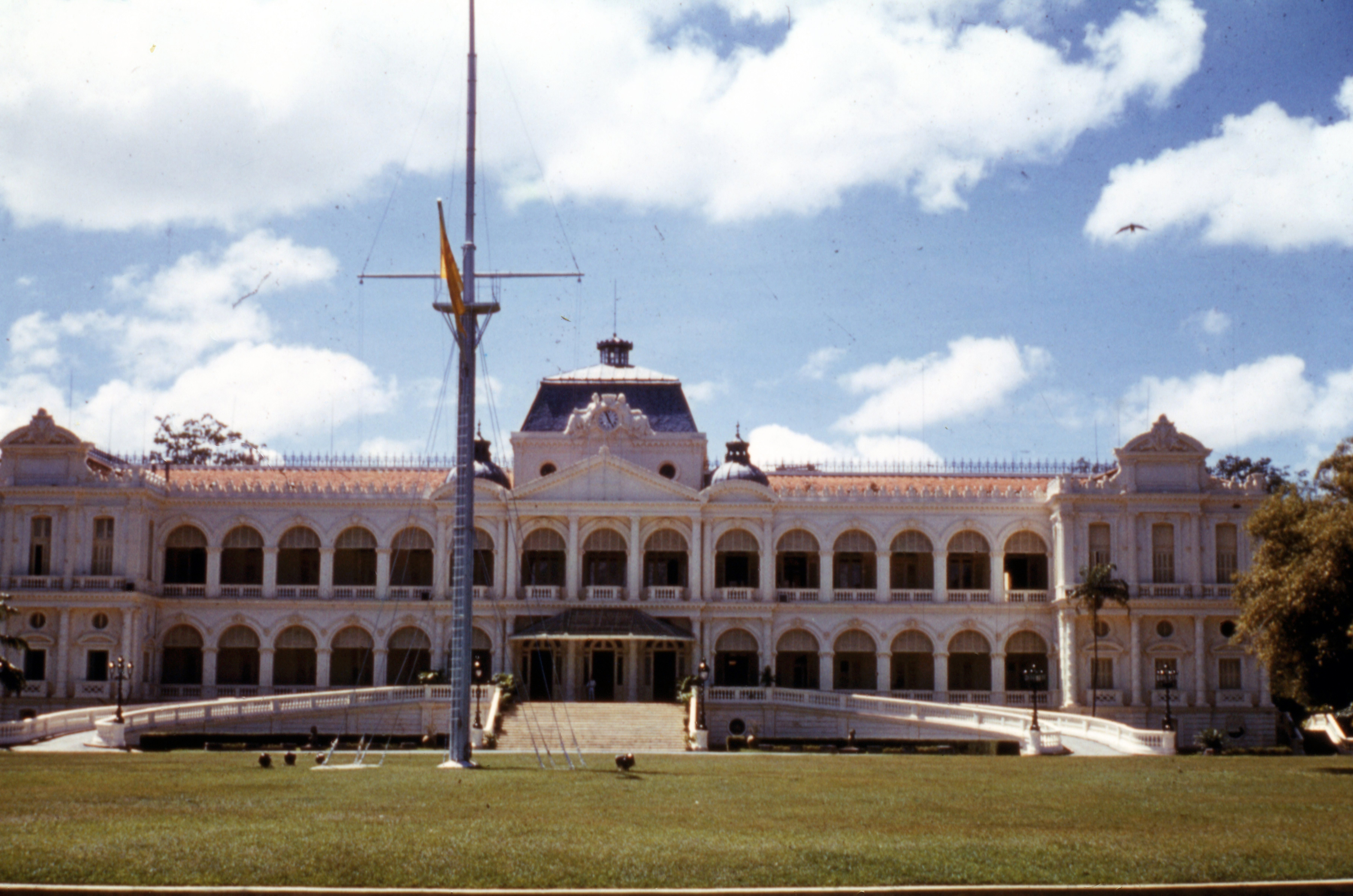
- Independence Palace before the bombing
- Location: Independence Palace, Saigon
- Date: 27 February 1962
- Target: Ngô Đình Diệm
- Attack type: Airstrike
- Weapon: 2 A-1 Skyraiders
- Injuries: 3 killed, 30 injured
- Perpetrators: Nguyễn Văn Cử; Phạm Phú Quốc

On 27 February 1962, the Independence Palace in Saigon, South Vietnam, was bombed by two dissident Republic of Vietnam Air Force pilots, Second Lieutenant Nguyễn Văn Cử and First Lieutenant Phạm Phú Quốc. The pilots targeted the building, the official residence of the President of South Vietnam, with the aim of assassinating President Ngô Đình Diệm and his immediate family, who acted as political advisors.

The pilots later said they attempted the assassination in response to Diệm's autocratic rule, in which he focused more on remaining in power than on confronting the Viet Cong (VC), a Marxist–Leninist guerilla army who were threatening to overthrow the South Vietnamese government. Cử and Quốc hoped that the airstrike would expose Diệm's vulnerability and trigger a general uprising, but this failed to materialize.

One bomb penetrated a room in the western wing where Diệm was reading but failed to detonate, leading the president to claim that he had "divine" protection. Except for Diệm's sister-in-law Madame Nhu, who suffered minor injuries, the Ngô family was unscathed. Three palace staff died, and 30 were injured. Afterward, Cử escaped to Cambodia, but Quốc was arrested and imprisoned.

In the wake of the airstrike, Diệm became hostile towards the American presence in South Vietnam. Diệm claimed that the American media was seeking to bring him down, and he introduced new restrictions on press freedom and political association. The media speculated that the United States would use the incident to justify the deployment of combat troops to South Vietnam; in the event, the U.S. remained circumspect. Domestically, the incident was reported to have increased plotting against Diệm by his officers.

== Planning ==
Cử was the second son of Nguyễn Văn Lực, a leader of the VNQDD (Vietnamese: Vietnamese Nationalist Party), which opposed the Diệm regime. In 1960, Diệm had jailed Lực for one month for engaging in "anti-government activities". The VNQDD planned that Cử and Quốc, another pilot from the same squadron, would attack the Independence Palace on 27 February. Quốc had recently been personally commended by Diệm for his achievements in combat, having been honoured as one of the best pilots in the Republic of Vietnam Air Force (RVNAF). Quốc had relatives who were involved with the VNQDD. Cử recruited Quốc by claiming the Republic of Vietnam Armed Forces and the United States were aware of the plot, showing him a Newsweek article critical of Diệm as evidence.

Quốc had more subordinates but was unsure of their loyalty, so he did not try to recruit them for the attack on the palace. Years later, Cử blamed Diệm's treatment of opposition parties as the motivation for his attack. He believed that Diệm had prioritized remaining in power over fighting the Vietcong and that, for six years, Cử had been denied promotion because of Diệm's obsession with hindering political opponents. Cử criticized the Americans for having supported Diệm, saying: "the Americans had slammed the door on those of us who really wanted the fight against the communists".

== Attack ==
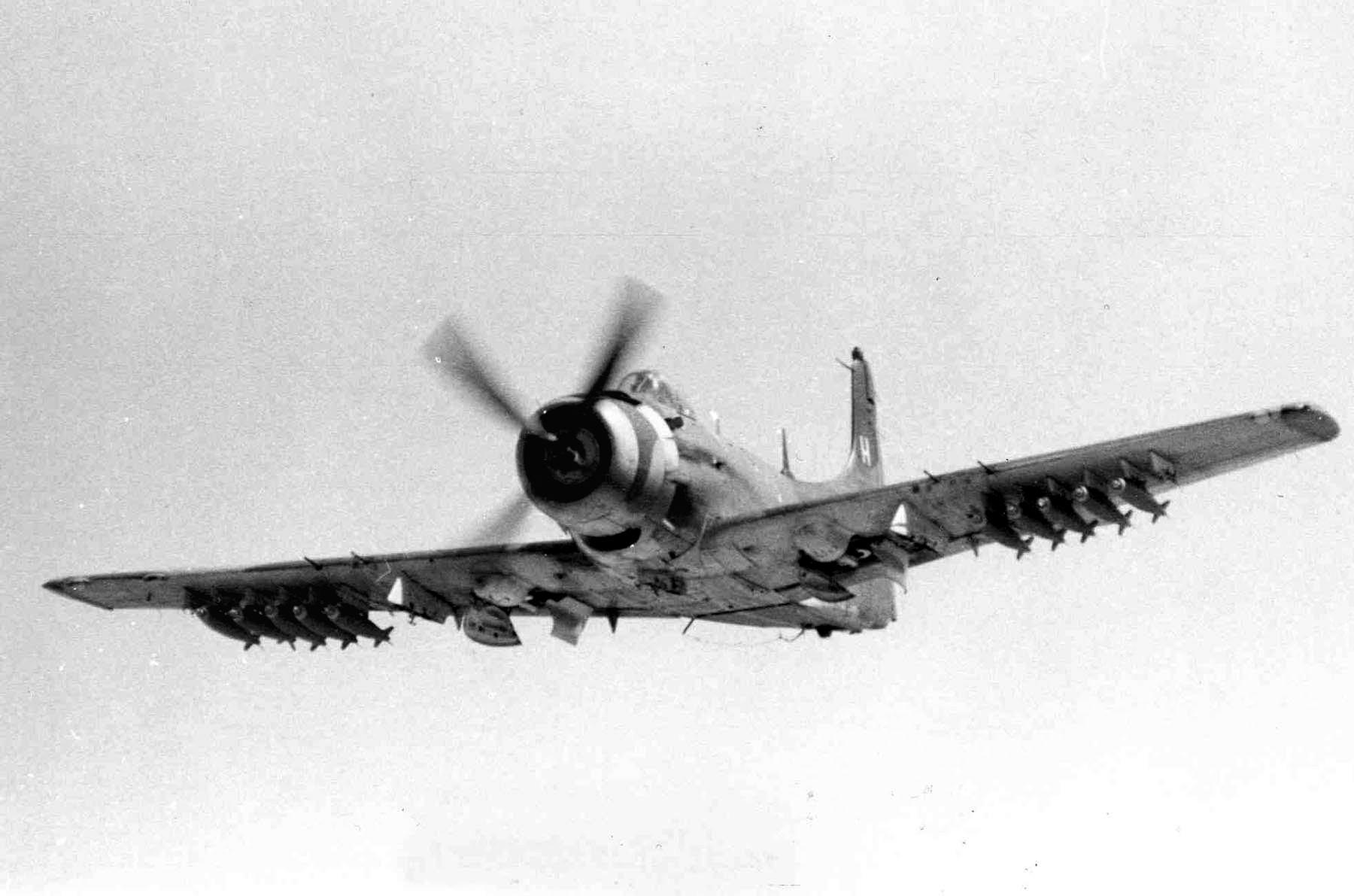
An A-1 Skyraider of the Vietnamese air force similar to the one used in the attack

Quốc and Cử, who were trained in France and the United States, respectively, were given orders to fly their A-1H/AD-6 Skyraider ground attack planes from Bien Hoa Air Base outside Saigon to the Mekong Delta in an early morning mission against the VC. The VC had been involved in attacks on Army of the Republic of Vietnam (ARVN) units 60 km (37 mi) south of the capital and had inflicted heavy damage. Instead of proceeding south from Bien Hoa Air Base as ordered, they changed course to attack the Independence Palace, the official presidential residence. This meant that two VC guerrilla companies could retreat after their attack without counter-attack.

At around 07:00, the deer on the expansive lawns of the French colonial-era palace were frightened off as Quốc, and Cử's planes flew low over their target to inspect the ruling family's residence. On their second run, they attacked with bombs and napalm before strafing the presidential compound with rocket and machine-gun fire. The duo continued their runs for 30 minutes before units loyal to the president arrived and fought back. Taking advantage of poor weather and low cloud cover, the two pilots circled the palace at altitudes of around 150 m (490 ft), periodically diving out of the clouds to re-attack before darting back into them. The airstrike caught the Presidential Guard by surprise, and, in confusion, they were unable to determine whether the aircraft were acting alone or with ground forces. Loyalist tanks and armored personnel carriers rushed to their battle stations. Anti-aircraft batteries opened fire, nearly hitting the loyalist aircraft from Bien Hoa Air Base in pursuit of the two rebel planes. Two tanks and a number of jeeps armed with .50-calibre machine guns patrolled the smoke-filled streets as a precaution.

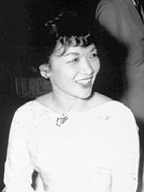
The rebel attack injured First Lady Madame Nhu.

The first 500 lb (230 kg) bomb penetrated a room in the western wing where Diệm was reading a biography of George Washington. The bomb failed to detonate, which gave Diệm enough time to seek shelter in a cellar in the eastern wing. He was joined there by his elder brother Archbishop Pierre Martin Ngô Đình Thục, younger brother Ngô Đình Nhu, Madame Nhu—who sustained an arm fracture while running toward the cellar—and their children. Elsewhere within the palace, three servants and guards were killed, and about thirty more staff were injured. Outside the palace grounds, an American contractor died after falling from a rooftop where he had been watching the bombing. Despite the confusion, most of the city's inhabitants went about their usual business, indifferent to the chaos. The attack lasted 30 minutes, and although they carried enough bombs to level the palace, the pilots did not expend all their munitions. Quốc's aircraft was damaged by fire from a minesweeper, forcing him to eject over the Saigon River and land in Nhà Bè, suffering minor facial injuries in the landing. He was arrested by a nearby naval patrol and, before being taken away for interrogation, reportedly asked, "did I kill that filthy character?" Cử believed the attack had been successful and managed to flee to Cambodia safely. Commenting on the attack, a US Air Force officer opined: "with that weather, they did a hell of a job".

== Aftermath ==
In a brief radio address, after order had been restored, Diệm dismissed the attack as an "isolated act" and attributed his escape to "divine protection". He visited the soldiers wounded in the attacks and also promised the rebel pilots' colleagues that they would not bear any responsibility for the bombing. American President John F. Kennedy promptly sent a message denouncing the attack as a "destructive and vicious act" and expressed relief that Diệm was "safe and unharmed". US ambassador Frederick Nolting determined that the attack had been the result of "two isolated cases" and opined that the incident did not represent widespread dissatisfaction with the regime. The absence of a VC reaction led Nolting to label the bombing as a "limited scope, anti-Communist assassination attempt". Diệm was praised for outwardly projecting a calm demeanor following the attack, and he moved to temporary government accommodation usually used for foreign dignitaries and visited Bien Hoa Air Base.

The National Assembly, Diệm's rubber stamp legislative body, urged the president to "take drastic measures against irresponsible elements". The day after the attack, the National Assembly's Steering Committee passed a resolution calling on Diệm to end "the policy of clemency" against dissidents and to "continue the struggle to protect the nation's destiny". They also called for punishments to be handed out to people who took advantage of the disorder by hoarding goods or speculating on food.

General Duong Van Minh, the presidential military advisor, attributed the assault to "disgruntled pilots" and noted that no hostile troop movements had occurred. The Civil Guard had remained loyal, and its commander ordered his airborne forces to take over Tan Son Nhut Air Base. A spokesperson for Diệm also denied that napalm had been used against the palace. This was widely believed to be because the government was sensitive to the ramifications of the RVNAF being revealed to have such weapons in their stocks. He claimed the situation was under "complete control".

The RVNAF reacted to the two pilots' actions by sending a resolution to Diệm, saying that the attack was an "absolutely isolated and foolish" event that "impaired the prestige of the air force" and was "detrimental to the national effort in the present struggle and is profitable to the Communists in their work of subversion". The RVNAF was regarded as being a highly loyal branch of the armed forces, and its commander, Colonel Nguyen Quang Vinh had claimed the year before, that all of the RVNAF's officer corps had voted for Diệm in the 1961 presidential election. Upon hearing of the attack, Vinh, who had been in Taiwan attending a conference, boarded a specially chartered airplane provided by Taiwanese President Chiang Kai-shek of Taiwan to return to Saigon to make a statement on the situation and the political reliability of the RVNAF.

The National Revolutionary Movement, an organization used by the Ngô family to stage orchestrated mass demonstrations in support of themselves, called for the death penalty against the two pilots and further asked Diệm to enact the "strictest measures to insure discipline in the military". The Director General of Information released a statement calling for the "complete crushing" of "reactionaries" as well as communists. It referred to the attack as an "odious attempt against the lives of the President of the Republic and his family" and went on to disseminate an official version of the events of 27 February, noting that "rumours have been running pertaining to the fate of Madame Ngo Dinh Nhu, who, with her family, as everyone knows, is a favorite target of the propaganda of reactionaries and Communists". The press release went on to describe the two rebel pilots as "ignominious people in the pay of the enemies of the Vietnamese people" and also assailed the foreign media, saying that "certain sections of the press of the world have given their support" to "reactionary and Communist propaganda". It concluded by saying "These developments clearly show that the leaders in their palace are sharing the fighting life of the people at the front. They confirm that in this battle to the end instigated by reactionaries and Communists against free Vietnam, there is no other duty for the people than to fight until the complete crushing of all their enemies is achieved.

As a result of the attack, Diệm ordered that all RVNAF aircraft be grounded and all aerial combat missions be suspended. At the same time, his security officials investigated fighter pilots for any possible anti-regime tendencies. This was achieved by placing tanks on the Bien Hoa Air Base runway. Without assistance from accompanying fighter craft, it was deemed too risky for American helicopters to operate in the jungles against the VC. On 2 March, three days after the attack, Diệm allowed the air force to resume combat operations, having concluded that Cử and Quốc's sentiments were not representative of the air force. For a few days after the attack, the areas around the palace were cordoned off, and tanks were stationed at prominent streets in the capital.

Quốc was imprisoned for his actions, while Cử remained in exile in Cambodia, where he worked as a language teacher. Cử told reporters in Cambodia that he was a nationalist, not a communist, and predicted that attacks against the ruling family would continue. Cử cited the regime's policies, rather than the president as a person, as the motivation for his attack. He said that "It is less Ngô Đình Diệm—sometimes well intentioned toward the population—than his family and supporters, who are hated by the army and the population". Diệm asked Cambodia to extradite Cử, but this request was refused. Cambodia's Prince Norodom Sihanouk and Diệm had extremely hostile relations, and the Ngô family had tried to depose him in the past by funding coup attempts. In 1959, Nhu tried assassinating Sihanouk by sending him a parcel bomb. As a result, Sihanouk routinely gave asylum to political refugees who had tried to depose or kill Diệm. In November 1960, he granted asylum to a group of paratroopers who tried to depose Diệm.

In the meantime, Diệm's police sought to track down Cử's father, who had gone into hiding following the assassination attempt. After Diệm's assassination in November 1963, Quốc was released from prison, and Cử returned from exile on 16 November, and they resumed their service in the RVNAF. Quốc advanced to the rank of lieutenant colonel in 18 months before being killed in an air raid over North Vietnam on 20 April 1965.

=== Diệm reaction ===
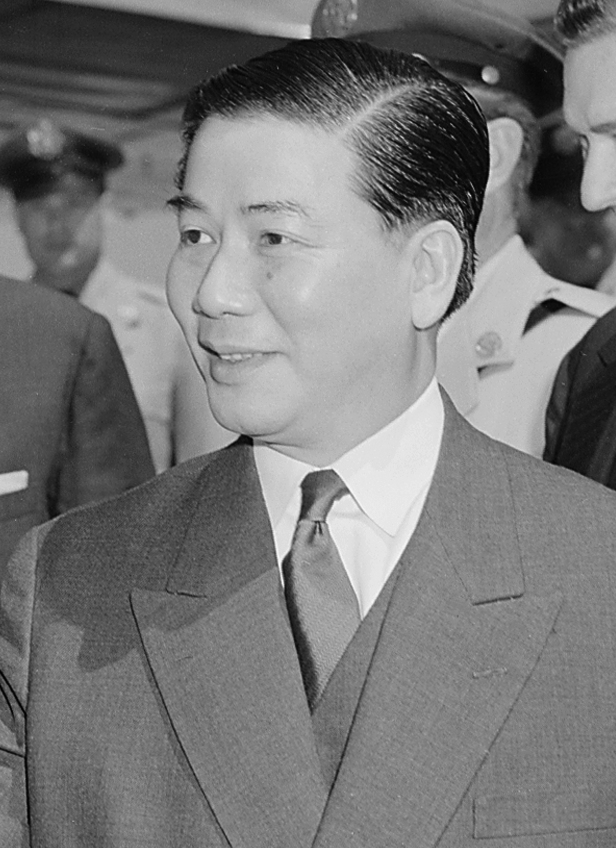
Ngô Đình Diệm

On 4 March, Diệm held a review of the RVNAF in central Saigon. Large crowds flocked to the Saigon River's banks to watch RVNAF aircraft formations on aerial parade. However, every day civilians were not allowed within a block of the presidential box, where Diệm was accompanied by Nolting and General Paul D. Harkins, commander of Military Assistance Command, Vietnam. The display included 29 A-1 aircraft, the type used in the attack on the Independence Palace. Diệm spoke about the events of 27 February and noted that he was "not unaware" of the supportive reaction of the various segments of society to "the foolish act perpetrated by some treacherous elements" that had "tried to rouse bloody troubles which would have profited only enemies of the fatherland". He said that the bombing was "merely an isolated action of a few insane traitors to the fatherland and to the people, while the entire air force, like the rest of the armed forces, demonstrated unfaltering loyalty and an unwavering spirit of national unity by rapidly and effectively countering the aggression of two criminals". He described that attack as "the odious act of renegades" and called upon the RVNAF "to remain always vigilant, to turn away from all temptations, to scorn all perfidious schemes and to place the higher interest of the fatherland above personal interest". In response, the RVNAF chief Vinh, asked Diệm for "forgiveness and clemency" and presented a plaque inscribed with a resolution from the RVNAF condemning the attack.

During Nolting's first meeting with Diệm after the assassination attempt, the president adamantly asserted that the media was responsible for the bombing. He pointed to the Newsweek article and other "derogatory articles in the press", using them to justify his claim that "the Americans were supporting the revolution". Diệm declared that while some journalists were portraying the bombing as a wake-up call, he saw it as "a warning to them—an indicator of the danger of their irresponsibility in fomenting disorder".

In a later meeting with Harkins, Diệm joked: "I shouldn't have put him in the air force, because I had put his father in jail years ago". Diệm predicted that "sometime I'm going to get shot right in the back of the neck. Sometime they'll get me that way". (He and Nhu were deposed and shot dead during the November 1963 coup.) Diệm reacted to the assassination attempt by cracking down on political dissidents and further tightening press control. Off the record, one official admitted that "We don't even talk about freedom of the press or ask for other liberties anymore ... Diệm had completely surrounded himself in a protective oligarchy". Nhu justified further anti-opposition restrictions, remarking that "There's always going to be an opposition. If we take these people in, there will be another opposition springing up, because they are controversial men." Madame Nhu added, "You open a window to let in light and air, not bullets. We want freedom, but we don't want to be exploited by it."

=== U.S. reaction ===
The attack sparked conjecture that the United States might deploy combat troops in South Vietnam, even though, at the time, US military personnel were officially serving in solely advisory roles. In response to media concerns about the stability of the Diệm government, US Secretary of State Dean Rusk denied that the US had plans to deploy combat forces. He also ruled out negotiations with the VC, saying "the root of the trouble" was communist violations of the Geneva Accords.

United States Ambassador to India John Kenneth Galbraith lobbied Kennedy against the deployment of combat troops, believing that it would lead to endless South Vietnamese requests for more troops. Galbraith further thought that wasting US resources in the jungles of Vietnam would be playing into the hands of the Soviet Union. According to one US observer, the palace bombing provoked "full scale plotting against Diệm". Galbraith noted that "When the man in power is on the way down, anything is better" and considered that any change in South Vietnamese leadership would bring an improvement.
