= Cambodian Uprising (1840–1841) =

Anti-Vietnamese uprising in Cambodia

Cambodian uprising of 1840–1841
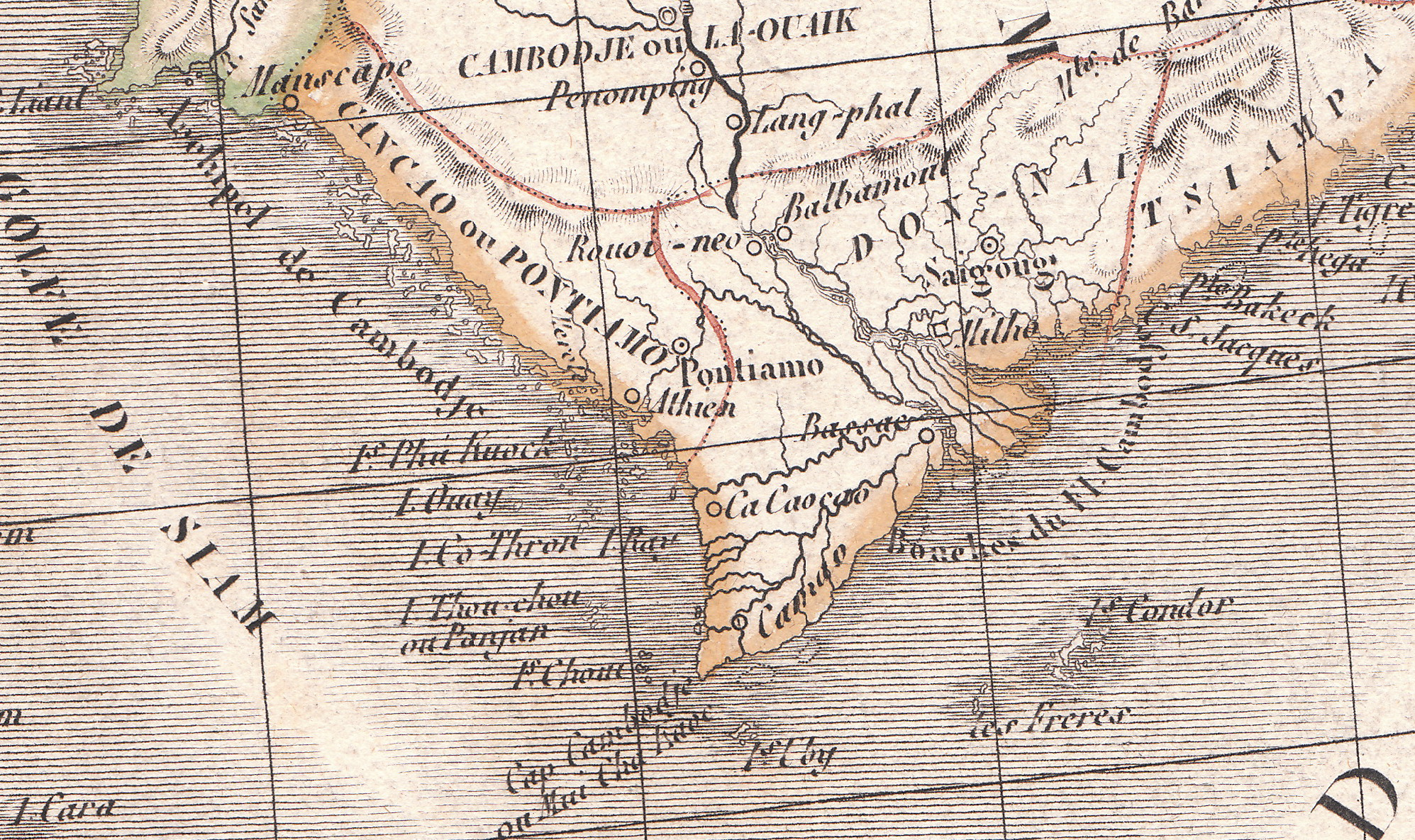
Date	3 September 1840 – 9 November 1841
Location	Cambodia, Cochinchina (Southern Vietnam)
Result	Uprising successful
Territorial changes	The end of Vietnamese rule in Cambodia

Belligerents
Kingdom of Cambodia; Kampuchea Krom; Military mercenaries: Rattanakosin Kingdom (Siam)	Nguyễn dynasty Tây Thành

Commanders and leaders
Ang Duong (Note: In Vietnamese records, he was called Nặc Ông Đôn (匿螉𧑒).) (after February 1841); Surkealok Muk; Samraong Tong clique; Outey Hing; Sena Sangkream; Bati clique; Vongsa Mey; Aekkareach Prom; Pisnulok Preak; Sena Mau †; Kampong Svay clique; Oknha Chet; Dechou Ros; Dechou Ey; Ba Phnum clique; Chakrey Nong; Kralahom Mouk; Thommeadecho Meas; Eastern Cambodian clique; Norensena Ten; Archun Kong; Siamese support; Bodindecha (Note: In Vietnamese records, he was called Phi nhã Chất tri (丕雅質知).); Chaophraya Nakhon; Phraya Suea; Sena Kuchen; Surkealok Kas; Phra Nong; Khmer Krom leaders in Southern Vietnam; Son Kuy (executed); Athikvongsa Tot (Note: Known as either “Việt Tốt” or “Sơn Tốt” in Vietnamese sources.); Oknha Thit (Note: Known as “Chân Triết” in Vietnamese sources.); Lâm Sâm; Chen Lin	Trấn Tây administration Trương Giảng; Phạm Điển (after January 1841); Lê Văn Đức (until March 1841); Bùi Công Huyên (until March 1841); Nguyễn Công Trứ (after January 1841); Cao Hữu Dực; Kampong Thom (Hải Đông); Trần Văn Thông; Hoàng Phước Lợi †; Pursat (Hải Tây); Võ Đức Trung; Nguyễn Song Thành; Sambok (Sơn Tĩnh); Phùng Nghĩa Phương; Nguyễn Tiến Phước; Pro-Vietnamese faction in Cambodia; Ang Mey (Note: In Vietnamese records, she was called Ngọc Vân (玉雲).) (after April 1841); Ang Em (Note: In Vietnamese records, he was called Nặc Ông Yêm (匿螉俺).) (after October 1841); Oknha Veang Tom; Oknha Montrey Sneha Preap; Po Prahum (Vu Khiêm); Khmer Krom front in Southern Vietnam; Dương Văn Phong (until March 1841); Bùi Công Huyên (after March 1841); Lê Quang Huyên; Nguyễn Văn Chương (after March 1841); Tây Ninh front Nguyễn Văn Trọng; Trương Văn Uyển; Vietnamese Leander in Cambodia; Trương Minh Giảng †

Strength
Khmer rebels: Unknown; Siamese: 20,000 mercenaries	Unknown

Casualties and losses
Unknown	Unknown

The Cambodian uprising of 1840–1841 was a general uprising of Khmer people against direct Vietnamese rule in September 1840. In response to Siamese invasion of Cambodia and Southern Vietnam in 1833, the Vietnamese Nguyen dynasty had annexed Cambodia into Trấn Tây Province in 1835 with Ang Mey as puppet female ruler under Trương Minh Giảng. Vietnamese rule over Cambodia was established with the consent of the pro-Vietnamese faction in Cambodia in order to repel and eliminate any Siamese influence or incursions into Cambodia but friction between the Khmers and the Vietnamese eventually led to the general uprising against Vietnam.

Not all of Cambodia was under Vietnam's Trấn Tây Province. Siam had earlier appropriated northwestern Cambodia, including Battambang and Siemreap, into its own direct rule in 1794. The Siam-held northwestern Cambodia, known in Thai historiography as Inner Cambodia, centered on Battambang, had been serving as the base for expansion of Siamese interests in Cambodia. Through this period of Vietnamese rule, the Siamese at Battambang had been looking for a ripening opportunity to reassert their domination over Cambodia. Defection of Cambodian Prince Ang Em from Siamese to Vietnamese side in 1839, dethronement of Queen Ang Mey, exile of Cambodian royalty and high-ranking Cambodian ministers in 1840 dissatisfied Khmer people, who viewed the Vietnamese as eroding their cultural identity and traditional governance. This Cambodian uprising against Vietnam in 1840 enabled Siam to push forward its candidate Prince Ang Duong for the Cambodian throne, instigating the Khmers to rise against the Vietnamese.

Cambodian uprising of 1840–1841 undermined Vietnamese position in Cambodia, allowing the Siamese armies under Chaophraya Bodindecha to march into Cambodia in November 1840 to take control of Cambodia, leading to the Siamese–Vietnamese War of 1840–1841. In spite of their precarious position, the Vietnamese still held out against the invading Siamese. Death of the Vietnamese Emperor Minh Mạng in 1841 spelt the end to Vietnamese rule in Cambodia as the new Vietnamese ruler Thiệu Trị favored withdrawal of Vietnamese troops from Cambodia. Thiệu Trị ordered the general retreat of the Vietnamese from Cambodia in late 1841, thus ending the six-year direct rule of Vietnam over Cambodia. Vietnamese withdrawal allowed the Siamese to take control over Cambodia, bringing Cambodia into another period of Siamese domination.

This Cambodian uprising against Vietnamese rule during 1840–1841 was a rare example of pre-revolutionary nationwide Cambodian uprising, comparable to that of Cambodian uprising against French rule in 1885–1886 and the 1916 Affair. For many years, the Siamese and the Vietnamese, aided by competing Cambodian factions, would battle in Cambodia, devastating Cambodia to the degree not to be achieved until the Cambodian Civil War of the 1970s.

== Background ==
=== Cambodia under Vietnamese domination ===
In 1794, King Rama I of Siam sent the young Cambodian king Ang Eng to rule in person after twelve years of refuge or captivity in Bangkok. The Siamese king Rama also separated northwestern Cambodia including Battambang and Siemreap to be under Chaophraya Aphaiphubet Baen the first Siam-appointed governor of Battambang under direct Siamese rule. King Ang Eng of Cambodia died in 1797, leaving four sons Ang Chan, Ang Sngoun, Ang Em and Ang Duong. King Rama I considered the princes too young to rule so he did not enthrone a new King of Cambodia until 1806, when the Siamese king eventually allow Ang Chan, eldest son of Ang Eng, to become the new King of Cambodia. However, Ang Chan, given his negative experiences with the Siamese court, became weary of Siamese domination over Cambodia and sought out for Emperor Gia Long of the Vietnamese Nguyen dynasty to counter Siamese influence. When King Rama I of Siam died in 1809, Ang Chan defied the Siamese right away, refusing to go to attend the funeral of the deceased Siamese king at Bangkok, sending his younger brothers Ang Sngoun and Ang Em to go in his stead. The new Siamese king Rama II made Ang Sngoun and Ang Em the Uprayorach (Second King) and the Ouparach (Third King), respectively, without consulting Ang Chan, turning Ang Sngoun into a pro-Siamese rival of Ang Chan.

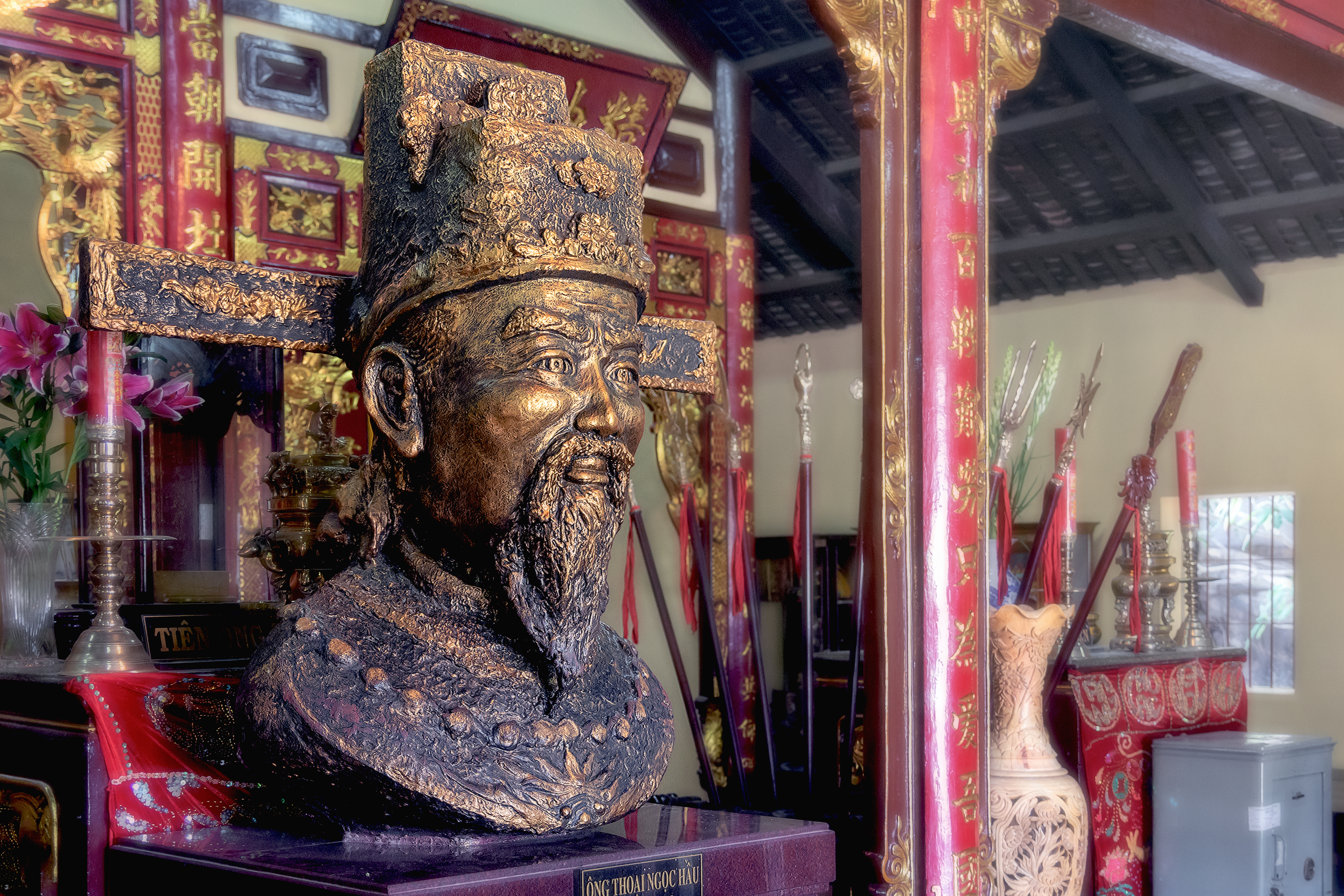
Nguyễn Văn Thoại the bảo hộ or Vietnamese resident of Cambodia, posthumously honored as Thoại Ngọc Hầu.

Ang Sngoun, younger brother of the incumbent King Ang Chan of Cambodia, rebelled at Pursat in 1812. The Siamese marched from Battambang into Cambodia to support Ang Sngoun, prompting Ang Chan to flee to take refuge at Saigon under Vietnamese protection. During the flight, Ang Em and Ang Duong, younger brothers of Ang Chan, decided to join the Siamese instead. The Siamese destroyed and burnt down the Cambodian royal capital of Oudong, which stood as the capital of Cambodia for two centuries, in early 1813 and took the three Cambodian princes Ang Sngoun, Ang Em and Ang Duong to live at Wang Chao Khamen or Cambodian quarters in Bangkok. Emperor Gia Long of Vietnam sent Lê Văn Duyết the Tổng trấn (總鎮) governor of Saigon and Viceroy of Cochinchina to march Ang Chan back to Cambodia in 1813, restoring Ang Chan to rule. As the royal capital was destroyed by the Siamese, Lê Văn Duyết built a new citadel at Phnom Penh called Banteay Keav for Ang Chan to reside as his capital. In 1814, Gia Long appointed Nguyễn Văn Thoại as bảo hộ or Protector of Cambodia, essentially the Vietnamese representative minister in Cambodia. The dynastic conflict of 1812–1813 shifted Cambodia from Siamese to Vietnamese domination as Siam lost control over Cambodia to Vietnam but Siam was waiting for the right moment to reclaim its control over Cambodia.

In 1819, Emperor Gia Long initiated a grand construction project of the Vĩnh Tế canal that connected Châu Đốc with Hà Tiên in Southern Vietnam bordering Cambodia. Emperor Gia Long died in early 1820, succeeded by his son Minh Mạng. In August 1820, a Cambodian Buddhist monk named Ke declared himself a Neak Sel or holy magician man, rallying Khmer people to rise against Vietnamese domination, leading to the Cambodian Uprising of 1820. Ke and his forced killed the governor of Ba Phnum and established themselves there. The Cambodian king Ang Chan, being under Vietnamese influence, was obliged to send forces under Chauvea Tolaha Tuan Pha (Cambodian Prime Minister of Cham ethnicity) and Samdech Chauponhea Tey to suppress this rebellion. However, Oknha Noren Kol defected to the rebel side and the royal forces were defeated. Lê Văn Duyết the governor of Saigon sent Nguyễn Văn Trí to bring Vietnamese forces to defeat and kill Ke at Koh Sotin, dissolving Ke's movement. Noren Kol and other followers of Ke were arrested and interrogated. They confessed it was the Cambodian ministers Chauvea Tolaha Tuan Pha and Samdech Tey that had instigated them to aid the rebels in the first place. Tuan Pha, Samdech Tey and Noren Kol were eventually executed.

In November 1820, King Ang Chan wrote to Lê Văn Duyết at Saigon, asking to resume the joint Cambodian–Vietnamese Vĩnh Tế canal construction project. 39,000 Southern Vietnamese and 16,000 Khmer men were conscripted to dig the canal day and night. The construction of the Vĩnh Tế canal was eventually finished in 1824. In the same year, King Chan of Cambodia offered three districts of Prey Kabbas (Lợi Kha Bát), Choan Chum (Chân Sum) and Moat Chruk (Mật Luật) and as a personal gift of gratitude to Nguyễn Văn Thoại the Vietnamese Protector of Cambodia. Minh Mạng told Nguyễn Văn Thoại to accept only two districts of Chân Sum and Mật Luật. Nguyễn Văn Thoại died in 1829 and Lê Văn Duyết also died three years later in 1832. Lê Văn Duyết had been the Tổng trấn or powerful Viceroy of Saigon, holding power over Southern Vietnam and Cambodia. Death of Lê Văn Duyết prompted Minh Mạng to enact administrative reforms in 1832 including the abolition of Tổng trấn in favor of Tổng đốc (總督). The Tổng đốc An Hà or governor of An Giang and Hà Tiên provinces would concurrently held the position of bảo hộ or Protector of Cambodia. In late 1832, Lê Đại Cương was appointed as the governor of An Giang and Hà Tiên, also Protector of Cambodia at the same time.

=== Siamese Invasion of Cambodia (1833) ===
In 1833, the new officials installed in Southern Vietnam by Emperor Minh Mạng reported that the late viceroy Lê Văn Duyết had been plotting a rebellion. Minh Mạng issued punishments to the associates of Lê Văn Duyết, prompting his adopted son Lê Văn Khôi to kill Minh Mạng's officials and rebelled at Saigon. In 1833, Vietnam was embroiled in three rebellions; Lê Duy Lương Rebellion in Nghệ An province, Le Van Khoi Rebellion at Saigon in the Southern Vietnam in Cochinchina and Nông Văn Vân Rebellion in Cao Bằng province in the Northern Vietnam. Taking advantage of unstable situation in Vietnam, Siam saw an opportunity to reclaim control over Cambodia and possibly to conquer Southern Vietnam. In November 1833, King Rama III of Siam, with the goal of establishing the pro-Siamese candidates Ang Em and Ang Duong to power in Cambodia and also conquering Saigon, sent Siamese armies to invade Cambodia and Southern Vietnam;

- Chaophraya Bodindecha the Samuha Nayok or Prime Minister of Siam led the Siamese forces of 40,000 men to invade Cambodia by land from Battambang, going through Cambodia to attack Saigon.
- Chaophraya Phrakhlang, personal name Dit Bunnag, the Minister of Trade, led the Siamese fleet of 10,000 men from Chanthaburi to attack Hà Tiên by sea, going through the waterways of Mekong Delta to attack Saigon.

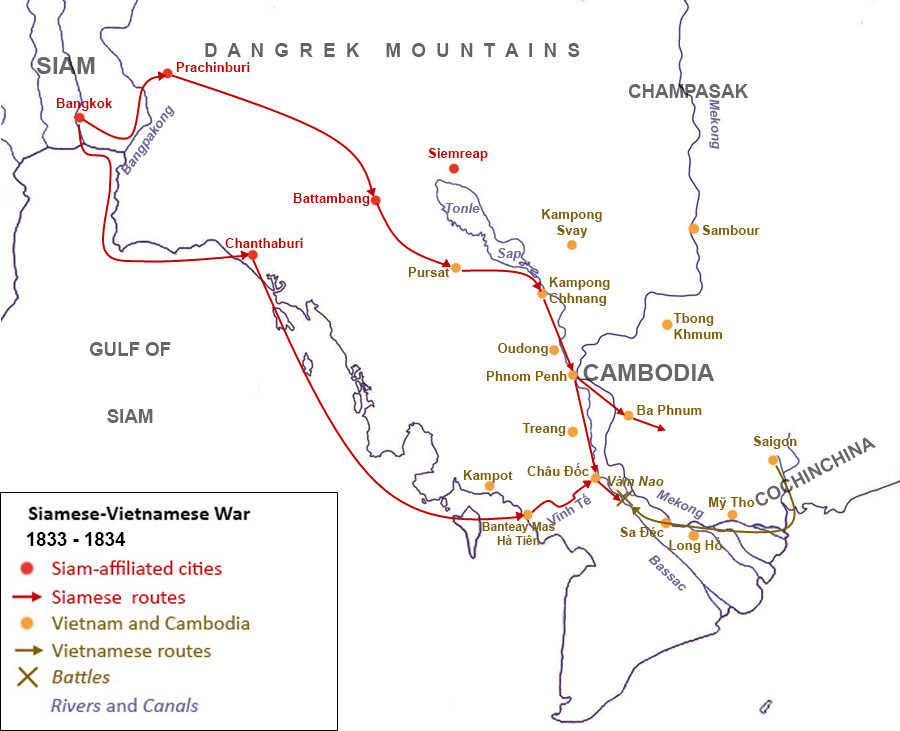
Siamese invasion of Cambodia and Southern Vietnam in November 1833 led to the Battle of Vàm Nao in January 1834, resulting in Siamese retreat and Vietnamese exertion of authority over Cambodia.

Alarmed by Siamese invasion, King Ang Chan of Cambodia dispatched his War Minister Oknha Chakrey Long to defend Cambodia but Chakrey Long could barely raise an army due to manpower shortage, unable to stop the Siamese at Kampong Chhnang. Ang Chan had to flee from his capital Phnom Penh to take refuge at Vĩnh Long in Cochinchina. Chaophraya Bodindecha and his Siamese armies marched through Cambodia with ease. Chaophraya Phrakhlang Dit Bunnag attacked Hà Tiên, surprising the Vietnamese, who were unprepared and concentrating on putting down the rebellion at Saigon. Bodindecha assigned Ang Em and Ang Duong to occupy the Cambodian royal capital of Phnom Penh at Banteay Keav. Two Siamese army routes of Bodindecha and Phrakhlang converged at Châu Đốc, where they proceeded downstream the Bassac River, going towards Saigon. However, the Vietnamese Emperor Minh Mạng allocated some troops from Saigon under Nguyễn Xuân, Trương Minh Giảng and Lê Đại Cương to face the invading Siamese.

The Siamese and the Vietnamese fought in the Battle of Vàm Nao in January 1834, in which the Vietnamese prevailed and the Siamese were defeated. The Battle of Vàm Nao turned the tide of war in favor of the Vietnamese. In his retreat, Chaophraya Bodindecha resorted to rounding up as many Khmer people as possible as captives in order to make up for the Siamese defeat. Bodindecha commanded the Princes Ang Em and Ang Duong to destroy Banteay Keav, the royal citadel of Phnom Penh. The Siamese suffered further from guerilla attacks of the Cambodians under Oknha Chakrey Long and Oknha Yomreach Hu, who preyed on the panicked retreating Siamese. Vietnamese commanders Nguyễn Xuân and Trương Minh Giảng and the Cambodian War Minister Chakrey Long pursued the Siamese to the edges of Cambodian territory. By April 1834, the Siamese had all retreated, with Bodindecha retreating to Battambang and Phrakhlang to Chanthaburi.

With the Siamese gone, the refugee king Ang Chan was paraded by the Vietnamese to return to Phnom Penh, where he found his residence, the citadel of Banteay Keav, built by Lê Văn Duyệt for him in 1813, destroyed and burnt down by the Siamese. Ang Chan built himself a temporary palace at Po Preah Bat, opposite of Phnom Penh on the Bassac River. Ang Chan also promoted his meritorious commanders Chakrey Long and Yomreach Hu to the positions of Chauvea Tolaha (Prime Minister) and Samdech Chauponhea (Deputy Prime Minister), respectively.

Siam's attempt to reassert control over Cambodia in 1833–1834 was a failure, in part due to their geographical unfamiliarity of the Mekong Delta and due to ability of the Vietnamese to allocate some of their troops of Saigon to fend off the Siamese. Despite Vietnam's victory over the Siamese in Cambodia, Emperor Minh Mạng and the frontline commanders Nguyễn Xuân and Trương Minh Giảng realized the gravity of Siamese military threats and the vulnerability of Cambodian defense. The Vietnamese then decided that reforms and greater authority were needed to safeguard Cambodia and Southern Vietnam from Siamese invasions.

=== Governance of Trấn Tây Province ===
The pro-Vietnamese king Ang Chan of Cambodia, already losing his administrative powers to the Vietnamese, died in January 1835, leaving the state seal to his Prime Minister Chauvea Tolaha Long, leaving no male heirs but four daughters Ang Pen, Ang Mey, Ang Peou and Ang Sgnoun born to different mothers, leaving the state affairs to Trương Minh Giảng and Lê Đại Cương. The Vietnamese seized the opportunity at the death of Ang Chan to assert more control over Cambodia. As the surviving male candidates, the Princes Ang Em and Ang Duong, were with the Siamese at Battambang, Minh Mạng and Trương Minh Giảng had to choose among four daughters of Ang Chan the new ruler of Cambodia. The eldest daughter was Princess Ang Pen or Ang Ben but her mother was Neak Neang Tep, daughter of Chaophraya Aphaiphubet Baen the first Siam-appointed governor of Battambang so Ang Pen was passed over due to her strong connection with Siam.

The Vietnamese built a new citadel at Phnom Penh called Trấn Tây (鎮西) in April 1835 to replace the Banteay Keav citadel that had been destroyed by the Siamese, also to serve as the center of Vietnamese administration in Cambodia.

The choice fell upon the second daughter Princess Ang Mey, who was enthroned as the Queen Regnant of Cambodia, granted the Vietnamese title Quận chúa (郡主), becoming the only historical female ruler of Cambodia. Other three princesses were granted the title of Huyện quân (縣君).

Cambodia under Vietnamese rule as Trấn Tây Province during 1835–1841, with Trấn Tây (Phnom Penh) as the capital with three regional centers; Hải Đông (Kampong Thom), Hải Tây (Pursat) and Sơn Phủ (Sambok)

In November 1835, Emperor Minh Mạng officially established Trấn Tây Thành (鎮西城) or Trấn Tây Province (lit. Western Commandery) over Cambodia, appointing Trương Minh Giảng as Trấn Tây tướng quân (鎮西將軍) or Governor-General of Trấn Tây and Lê Đại Cương as Tham tán Đại thần or counselor. The government of Trấn Tây Province spread along the existing Cambodian administrative network, with the central government at Trấn Tây in Phnom Penh. Trấn Tây's central government at Phnom Penh composed of the Tướng quân (將軍) or Governor-General, his counselor called Tham tán Đại thần (參贊大臣), and a Đề Đốc (提督) military commander. Regionally, Cambodia srok districts were supplanted with thirty-three Vietnamese districts or phủ (府), which were given Sino-Vietnamese names with Governors or Tuyên phủ (宣撫) installed at three important regional towns; Kampong Thom (Hải Đông, 海東), Pursat (Hải Tây, 海西) and Sambok (Sơn Phủ). Kampot (Quảng Biên) and Kampong Saom (Khai Biên) were incorporated into Vietnam's Hà Tiên province. Districts were administered by the Vietnamese governors, seconded by Cambodian Oknha. Even though the Vietnamese dominated central governance, the Cambodians were still left with much role in regional administration.

As Cambodia, like Siam, had no standing army as the untrained conscripts were levied during wars, Minh Mạng sought to arm Cambodia militarily to defend against Siamese invasions. Trương Minh Giảng took over the Cambodian military, establishing new hierarchy and training units throughout Cambodia. Trương Minh Giảng brought 5,000 Vietnamese military men to Phnom Penh to occupy Cambodia. Proportion of ethnicities of military personnel was one Vietnamese per four enlisted Cambodians. The Trấn Tây regime also sought to quantify and systematize landholdings and taxation. Trương Minh Giảng was additionally made the governor of An Giang and Hà Tiên provinces (Tổng đốc An Hà) in September 1836, giving Trương Minh Giảng an unparalleled power and influence over Cambodia and Cochinchina.

=== Ethnocultural assimilation and economic integration ===
Minh Mạng, himself a staunch Confucian, viewed that the Confucian bureaucracy should be the better alternative. Around 5,000 Vietnamese people moved into Cambodia each year. Cambodia and Vietnam, however, belonged to totally different cultural spheres, where Indosphere borders Sinosphere. The Trấn Tây authority ordered the Khmer people to wear trousers instead of skirts, to wear hair long instead of short-cropped and to adopt Vietnamese cultural practices, including costume, rituals and hairstyle.

Cambodia, like Laos and Siam, had been underpopulated. The land was abundant but the people were few. There was few labor force to clear the forests and to grow crops nor there were incentives for land development and urbanization in traditional Southeast Asian Theravadin cultural sphere, in which subsistence rather than development-driven economy thrived. The Vietnamese found Cambodia to be lacking in agriculture, being mostly in jungles, which the Vietnamese considered wasted opportunities. According to Minh Mạng, about Cambodia; "the land is plentiful and fertile, and that there are plenty of oxen but the people had no knowledge of agriculture, using picks and hoes, rather than oxen. They grow enough rice for two meals a day, but they don't store any surplus.". A Vietnamese official reported that only thirty to forty percent of Cambodian lands were cultivated. The Vietnamese then pioneered intensive agricultural development in Cambodia, in which the Khmers were conscripted for corvée labor, plantations and forest cutting.

=== Snang Ey Uprising at Kampong Svay ===
Earlier, Oknha Dechou Meng the pro-Thai Cambodian governor of Kampong Svay, who had been in conflicts with the pro-Vietnamese king Ang Chan, fled in 1814 along with his son Snang Ey from Kampong Svay to Khong in Southern Laos, in the territory of the Siam-controlled Champasak Kingdom. Later, Snang Ey the son of Oknha Dechou Meng returned to Cambodia and became a Khmer official serving the Cambodian bureaucracy in Kampong Svay.

Two years into the establishment of Trấn Tây regime, Khmer people began to feel the effect of limitless authority of Vietnamese commissioners. In 1837, Trương Minh Giảng came up with a construction project of a long road connecting Trấn Tây or Phnom Penh to the Southern Cambodian town of Treang and eventually ending at Hà Tiên in Cochinchina with outposts built along the road at every two kilometers to facilitate communications between Cambodia and Southern Vietnam. This Vietnamese-pioneered construction project seemed to offend the Oknhas of Southern Cambodia.

In the same year, two Cambodian Oknhas from Kampong Saom (a Cambodian port town in Southwestern Cambodia on the coast of Gulf of Siam, Vietnamese name Khai Biên, then part of the Vietnamese Hà Tiên province) called Oknha Chey and Oknha Chu, who were brothers, took up arms and rallied the Khmers against the Vietnamese rule. Trương Minh Giảng quickly sent Khmer-Vietnamese forces to put down this rebellion. Oknha Chey and Oknha Chu fled to Siam.

The first serious challenge to the rule of Trấn Tây regime sprang up in Kampong Svay–Kampong Thom or Hải Đông district. Kampong Svay was one of the five major regional towns of Cambodia. Governors of five chief cities of Cambodia were called Sdach Tranh or "King of the Field", who had semi-autonomous powers in their areas called Dey. The Sdach Tranh governors of Kampong Svay held the title Oknha Dechou. Kampong Svay held jurisdiction over the area generally to the east of Tonle Sap Lake, spanning from Baray to Stoung, which bordered the Siamese-controlled Siemreap district via Chikraeng. In the Trấn Tây administration, the Vietnamese established their headquarter at Kampong Thom, which they called Hải Đông, about fifteen kilometers to the southeast of Kampong Svay, locating on the Steung Saen River. Kampong Thom or Hải Đông was considered one of the three important regional towns so a Vietnamese governor Tuyên phủ was appointed to Kampong Thom.

Cambodian monk named Pich, recounting his experiences in his writing Raba Ksatr Pheanday Udai Raja Eng Chant (1855) or "History of the Reign of King Outey Reachea Ang Chan", narrated that the Khmers of Kampong Svay district were subjected to intensive labor works including digging earth, building fortresses, rice cultivation and rice transportation. Pich stated that even the Cambodian officials of Kampong Svay had to manually do the labors themselves but no one dared to speak up because they feared the Vietnamese authorities

In 1837, an Oknha Decho named Ream, the Sdach Tranh governor of Kampong Svay, rebelled in Kampong Svay against the Trấn Tây regime. Trương Minh Giảng against sent forces to suppress this rebellion, capturing Oknha Decho Ream to be executed at Phnom Penh. Trương Minh Giảng then appointed Oknha Chap (Sa Tháp) as the new Oknha Decho governor of Kampong Svay. Giảng also appointed Snang Ey (Đô Y) with the Vietnamese position of Chánh lãnh binh to Kampong Thom.

Oknha Chey and Oknha Chu of Kampong Saom (Khai Biên), who had earlier escaped to Siam in 1837, returned to Kampong Saom and instigated a Cambodian official in Kampong Saom named Di, who was holding the Vietnamese position of An Phủ of Khai Biên to rebel against the Vietnamese in February 1838. This Cambodian uprising at Kampong Saom was eventually subdued by the Vietnamese authorities of Hà Tiên province.

In January 1838, the Vietnamese found out that Oknha Dechou Chap the Sdach Tranh governor of Kampong Svay had been collaborating with the Siamese so Dechou Chap was arrested to Phnom Penh, where he was subsequently executed. Then in February 1838, Snang Ey arose against Vietnamese rule. Snang Ey rallied 1,000 Khmer men from Kampong Svay district to rise up to massacre the Vietnamese in this whole district, from Baray to Stoung. Trương Minh Giảng was infuriated and embarrassed when this incident was reported to the Emperor Minh Mạng, albeit in softer narrative. As the result of this mishap, Lê Đại Cương was dismissed from his Tham tán Đại thần counselor position, sent to a military garrison at Kampong Thom, eventually sent to be imprisoned. Lê Đại Cương was replaced by Dương Văn Phong as the counselor of Trấn Tây.

Trương Minh Giảng and Chauvea Tolaha Long the Cambodian Prime Minister led the Cambodian–Vietnamese forces to put down the Kampong Svay rebellion. The fighting continued into March, when the Trấn Tây and the rebels clashed at Steung Trang and Kampong Siem on the Mekong. Snang Ey and his irregulars could not stand against the professionally trained Vietnamese forces from the capital. Snang Ey and his allies fled north across the Tonle Repou River into the Siam-controlled Lao Champasak kingdom, taking with him the majority of Khmer inhabitants of Stoung and Chikreang.

=== Further government reforms in Trấn Tây ===
During the first years of the Trấn Tây regime, the Vietnamese Emperor Minh Mạng took a paternalistic and gradualist approach towards integration of Cambodia into Vietnam. After the Cambodian uprisings at Kampong Svay and Kampong Saom from 1837 to early 1838, the Cambodian insurgencies cooled down but Minh Mạng and Trương Minh Giảng took a harder, less reconciliatory stance. In 1838, Minh Mạng complained that the Cambodians disregarded his generosity in spite of his best intentions; "Imperial troops were dispatched to Cambodia, costing millions of coins, and brought you security by destroying the Siamese. Troops were stationed to bring peace, like bringing the Khmer people out of the mud into a warm feather bed. Why are there people who hate us and believe the rebels?" The six-year period of Vietnamese rule over Cambodia would not be remembered by elegant Confucian-style institutional and cultural reforms but rather by persistent subjugation of Khmer people to labors and hardships and the threat to Khmer identity, becoming the nadir of Post-Angkor Cambodian history.

Administration of the Trấn Tây government in Cambodia required officials trained in Confucian statecraft, which were not locally produced in Cambodia but rather imported from Vietnam. Earlier in 1835, low-ranking mandarins and secretaries from Huế were imported into Cambodia to work in the Trấn Tây administration. Later in that year, ten Vietnamese provincial educational ministers and sixty-eight low-ranking provincial officials were sent into Cambodia. The educational ministers were to teach Vietnamese language to the Khmers. However, shortage of officials trained in Sino-Vietnamese bureaucracy was a persisting problem.

Next year, in 1839, Minh Mạng was upset to learn that the Cambodian ministers and officials still stuck with the usage of their traditional Cambodian noble titles like Oknha instead of the Vietnamese titles like Huyện uý, Phủ uý, Quản cơ or Phó quản bestowed upon them; "in correspondence and conversation they still use Cambodian titles. The Cambodians should be told that it is an honor to have titles bestowed upon them by our court. In conversations, therefore, they should use our titles rather than theirs."Trương Minh Giảng proposed to replace the chauvay srok or Cambodian Oknha town governors with Vietnamese governors, starting with the srok surrounding Trấn Tây or Phnom Penh first.

=== Northwestern Cambodia under Siamese rule ===
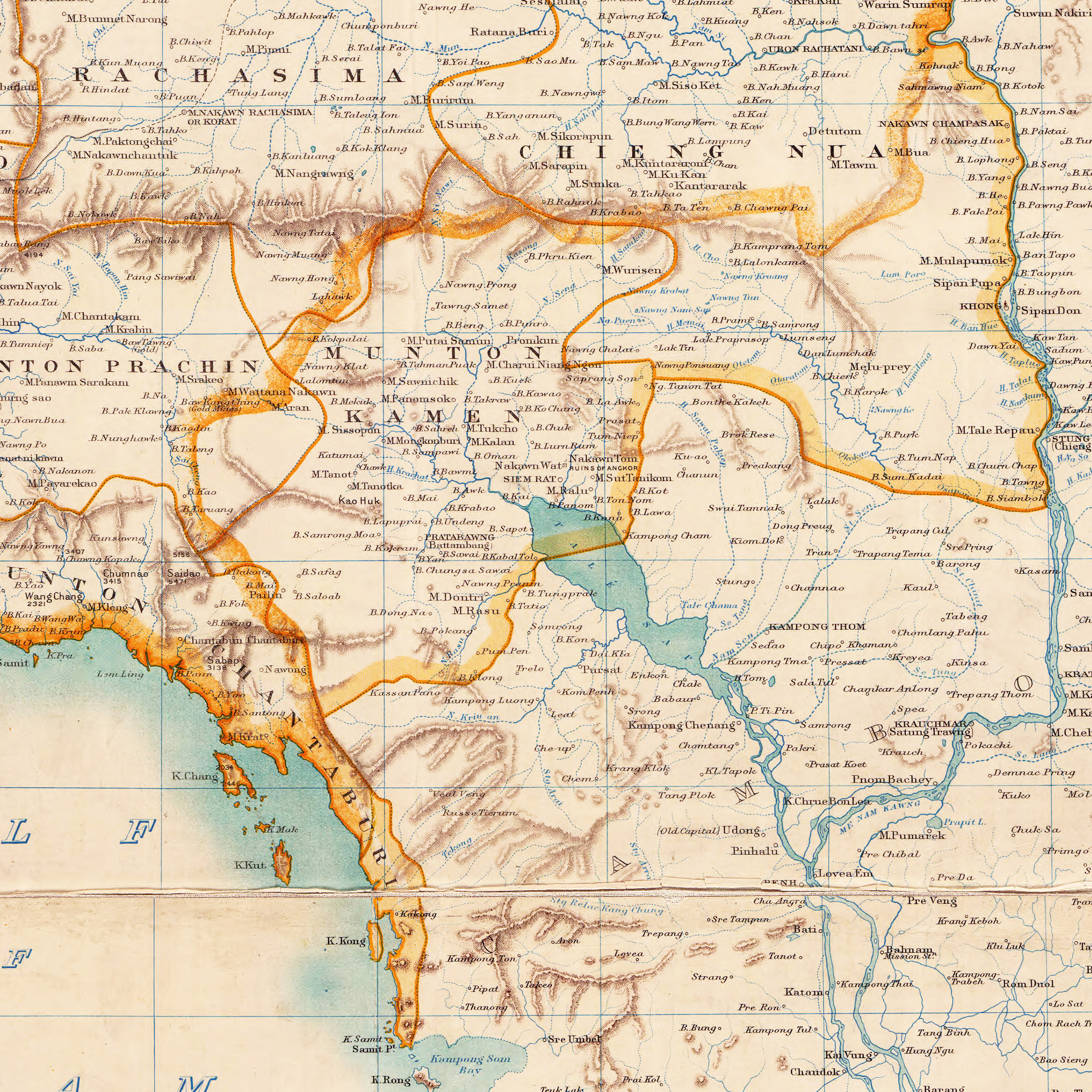
Northwestern Cambodia, including Battambang and Siemreap, known as Inner Cambodia by Siam, was annexed in 1795 and remained under Siamese rule for 112 years until the Franco-Siamese treaty of 1907 returned this area to French Cambodia.

When King Rama I of Siam sent the Cambodian king Ang Eng out to rule Cambodia in person in 1794, Siam annexed Northwestern Cambodia including Battambang and Siemreap and gave it to Chaophraya Aphaiphubet Baen the first Siam-appointed governor of Battambang to govern. Siam had been in control of Northwestern Cambodia through the Siam-appointed governors of Battambang since then. In 1834, when Chaophraya Bodindecha and the Siamese had retreated from Cambodia to Battambang, King Rama III of Siam made Prince Ang Em the governor of Battambang. Ros, son of Chaophraya Aphaiphubet Baen, was appointed as Phraya Palat the vice-governor of Battambang under Ang Em. Prince Ang Duong, younger brother of Ang Em, was made by Siam as governor of Mongkolborey. Though defeated, the Siamese remained vigilant and made extensive preparations for prospective reassertion of Siamese influence over Cambodia. Chaophraya Bodindecha built a new Battambang fortress in February 1837 and Siemreap was fortified in 1839. In April 1837, Bodindecha went to Khukhan and made extensive manpower survey of Northern Khmer towns in order to enlist Northern Khmer people into future wars with Cambodia–Vietnam. Coincidental or not, Bodindecha's stay at Battambang and Khukhan happened in the same time as the devastating Snang Ey's rebellion in Kampong Svay.

The Siamese allowed Northwestern Cambodia to retain most of its Khmer ethnic identity and culture, never pursuing assimilation policies like the Vietnamese. The Siamese government of Battambang was filled mostly with Cambodian officials working under Siam. There was no need to assimilate nor integrate Northwestern Cambodia as the Cambodians and the Siamese already had similar cultures, both belonging to the same Southeast Asian Theravadin cultural sphere. Governance and bureaucracy of Cambodia and Siam were similar with cognate rank and title names, for example; Oknha vs Phraya, Yomreach vs Yommarat, Chakrey vs Chakri, Kralahom vs Kalahom, etc. However, these Cambodian ministerial positions did not exist in Battambang because they could only be appointed by the ruler of Cambodia. The government of Battambang and Siemreap were treated as a Siamese provincial administration.

The Siamese demanded cardamom tributes that involved conscripting local Khmer and Chong people to gather cardamoms from the Cardamom Mountains. The Siamese court at Bangkok would then sell the cardamoms gathered from Battambang to Chinese merchants at high prices to earn revenue. The Siamese also mobilized Northwestern Cambodian people for warfare and constructions. In April 1837, Chaophraya Bodindecha conscripted Central Siamese and Lao men to construct the new Battambang city, moving from its previous site at Baset to the present-day site on the Sangkae River. When Jens Westengard the American advisor to King Chulalongkorn conducted a survey of Northwestern Cambodia, known as Monthon Burapha, in 1904, he found out that the region was overwhelmingly Cambodian, with only 2,000 Thai people out of 300,000 inhabitants of the region, despite 112 years of Siamese rule.

== Precipitating Events ==
=== Political Conflict in Battambang ===
In 1827, Phraya Aphaiphubet Ros the Siam-appointed governor of Battambang was accused by his deputy Chet of incompetence, resulting in the dismissal of Ros from the governorship of Battambang. Chet replaced Ros as Phraya Aphaiphubet the governor of Battambang and Chet's son Som was appointed Phra Phithakbodin, an official in Battambang. Phraya Aphaiphubet Chet accompanied Chaophraya Bodindecha on the Siamese invasion of Cambodia in 1833 and when Chet returned to Battambang in 1834, he died. King Rama III and Bodindecha decided to make the Cambodian prince Ang Em, the Siam-sponsored pretender to the Cambodian throne, the governor of Battambang in order for Ang Em to rally supports from Khmer people. Phraya Palat Ros was made the vice-governor of Battambang under Ang Em. Meanwhile, Prince Ang Duong was appointed the governor of Mongkolborey, another town in northwestern Cambodia.

Lack of male Cambodian royalty was a disadvantage of the Vietnamese in procuring support from the Cambodian Oknhas. Perhaps having a traditional legitimate male Cambodian king under Vietnamese influence would persuade the Cambodians to acquiesce to Vietnamese rule, like during the reign of Ang Chan. Trương Minh Giảng then devised a plan to make Prince Ang Em defect to Vietnamese side. Around 1837, according to Cambodian and Thai chronicles, Trương Minh Giảng sent a Vietnamese man who used to take care of Ang Em when he was young to bear a secret letter from Giảng to Ang Em at Battambang, urging Ang Em to defect to Vietnam, promising to make Ang Em the rightful King of Cambodia. However, Ang Em was in no position to do anything as the powerful Siamese general Bodindecha still had much presence.

Secret communications between Ang Em and Trương Minh Giảng led to a fallout between the princely brothers Ang Em and Ang Duong. Chauvea Tolala Long the Prime Minister of Cambodia, knowing that the Vietnamese Governor-General had made a confidential contact with Ang Em, Tolaha Long made his own bid by sending a secret letter to Ang Duong at Mongkolborey, urging Ang Duong to defect to Cambodia. Internal politics of Battambang also came into play. Phraya Palat Ros then took the side of Ang Em, while Phra Phithakbodin took the side of Ang Duong. Cambodian chronicles stated that Ang Duong was framed by Ang Em but Thai chronicles told a different story; it was Tolaha Long who persuaded Ang Duong to mutiny against Siam. Bodindecha and the Siamese were completely unaware of these secret political endeavors.

Departure of Chaophraya Bodindecha to Bangkok in 1838 put Battambang in political struggles. Ang Duong and Phra Phithakbodin Som planned a coup in Battambang in November 1838. The Siam-appointed governor of Moung Ruessei was to march military forces from Moung Ruessei to seize Battambang for Ang Duong. However, the plan leaked to Ang Em's faction. Unusual military march from Moung Ruessei towards Battambang confirmed the suspicion. Phraya Palat Ros reported this impending rebellion in Battambang to Bangkok in November 1838, on behalf of Ang Em, leading to the arrest of Prince Ang Duong, Phra Phithakbodin and their accomplices to Bangkok. Ang Duong was imprisoned but was later released and put under house arrest instead. King Rama III of Siam decided not to punish Phra Phithakbodin Som and his associates for the sake of political peace in Battambang and released Phithakbodin and other conspirators of Ang Duong's plot to return to Battambang. Ang Em the governor of Battambang assigned Phithakbodin as a border patrol at Moung Ruessei.

=== Defection of Ang Em to Vietnam ===
After Ang Duong's abortive plot, one year later, it was Ang Em's turn to arise. Taking advantage of absence of Bodindecha in Battambang, on 24 December 1839, Cambodian Prince Ang Em, being the Siam-sponsored candidate for about twenty years since the death of his elder brother Prince Ang Sngoun in 1816, disappointed by Siamese failures to put him on the Cambodian throne, becoming a mere Battambang governor, mutinied against Siam and seized power in Battambang. Ang Em reportedly held two swords in his two hands and led his forces to storm the residence of Phraya Palat Ros the vice-governor of Battambang. Ang Em's forces shot dead a door guard and a concubine of Palat Ros. Phraya Palat Ros put up a gun to fight but his wife urged him to stop resisting or else their whole family would be killed. Palat Ros surrendered as Ang Em captured Cambodian–Siamese officials of Battambang and forced around 5,000 to 6,000 inhabitants of Battambang to leave the city, going to join the Vietnamese. French missionary Jean-Claude Miche, who happened to be in Battambang during this event, told that, in the night of December 24, 800 barges carried off around 8,000 to 10,000 souls to leave Battambang to follow Ang Em (called Neac Ang Em by Miche). By the morning on Christmas, December 25, Battambang became a deserted evacuated city, with only an ailing old woman and a drunkard man remaining.

In January 1840, Prince Ang Em (called Nặc Yêm in Vietnamese), along with his entourage, his captured Battambang officials including Phraya Palat Ros (Ba Lặc Đột) and the inhabitants of Battambang, traveled by the Tonle Sap Lake and reached the Vietnamese-controlled Pursat. The Vietnamese Đề Đốc commander at Pursat Võ Đức Trung reported to Trương Minh Giảng at Phnom Penh, who then reported to the Vietnamese Emperor Minh Mạng at Huế. Unlike Trương Minh Giảng, Minh Mạng had no intentions of raising Ang Em to be the Cambodian king, saying that Ang Em's crimes were unforgivable. Minh Mạng ordered Ang Em detained and ordered Phraya Palat Ros, the Siamese leader, to be transferred to Huế in chains for interrogations. Followers and servants of Prince Ang Em were deported to be resettled in Saigon, Vĩnh Long and Đồng Nai in Southern Vietnam. The Cambodian inhabitants of Battambang coming with Ang Em were distributed to be resettled in the towns of the Pursat or Hải Tây district including Krakor, Krang, Baribour and Kampong Chhnang. Ang Em and Palat Ros were taken to Trấn Tây or Phnom Penh in January 1840.

=== Aftermath of Ang Em's defection ===
Chaophraya Bodindecha was greatly alarmed by the news of developments in Battambang and hurriedly took off from Bangkok with Siamese armies January 1840 to Battambang. At Battambang, Bodindecha conducted a survey on the losses. He found out that Ang Em had taken with him 181 officialdom families, 503 families of inhabitants of Battambang and also 319 families of inhabitants of Moung Ruessei. 119 families and some officials remained in Battambang. Bodindecha made Phra Phitakbodin Som (conspirator of Ang Duong's plot) the interim governor of Battambang. Phra Narinyotha Nong was made the interim Palat or vice-governor of Battambang.

Defection of Ang Em, who had taken virtually all the manpower and resources with him to join Vietnam, had a devastating effect for the Siamese. Battambang, serving as the buffer zone between Central Siam and Cambodia since the late eighteenth century, was then completely exposed. Cambodian or Vietnamese invasion could happen anytime. Northern Khmer troops of 4,300 men conscripted from Khukhan, Surin, Sankha and Sisaket arrived in Battambang but Bodindecha could not station them in Battambang due to food shortage so he had to send these Northern Khmer men out to guard at Siemreap, Muong Reussei and Kampong Preah, the area surrounding Battambang instead, while Bodindecha himself would rehabilitate Battambang. Ang Em and Palat Ros were sent to Huế. Ang Em was imprisoned. Neak Neang Ros, mother of Ang Em and Ang Duong, whom Ang Em had taken with him from Battambang, was put under house arrest in Saigon. Ang Phim, son of Ang Em, was also imprisoned in Saigon.

Minh Mạng saw Siam as being on high alert after the defection of Ang Em but Siam was also in a weakened state due to the loss of manpower in Battambang. As the Siamese would soon march into Cambodia again in order to pursue Ang Em, Minh Mạng decided that he should strike first. However, the Vietnamese should not directly attack Battambang or else it would lead to a major Siamese–Vietnamese War. It should be the Cambodian leaders who marched to attack Battambang, which would be treated as a Cambodian internal conflict. Ang Chan had long coveted for the recovery of northwestern Cambodia taken from his father Ang Eng by Siam in 1794, which he did not accomplish before his death in 1835. This was the best time for the Cambodia to reclaim the area. Trương Minh Giảng told the top three Cambodian ministers Chauvea Tolaha Long the Prime Minister, Samdech Chauponhea Hu the Deputy Prime Minister and Oknha Kralahom Kinh to bring Cambodian forces to attack and reclaim Battambang. The three Cambodian ministers, however, refused on the grounds that the Siamese had already been vigilant after Ang Em's defection and their chance of victory was low.

=== Trấn Tây government reform of 1840 ===
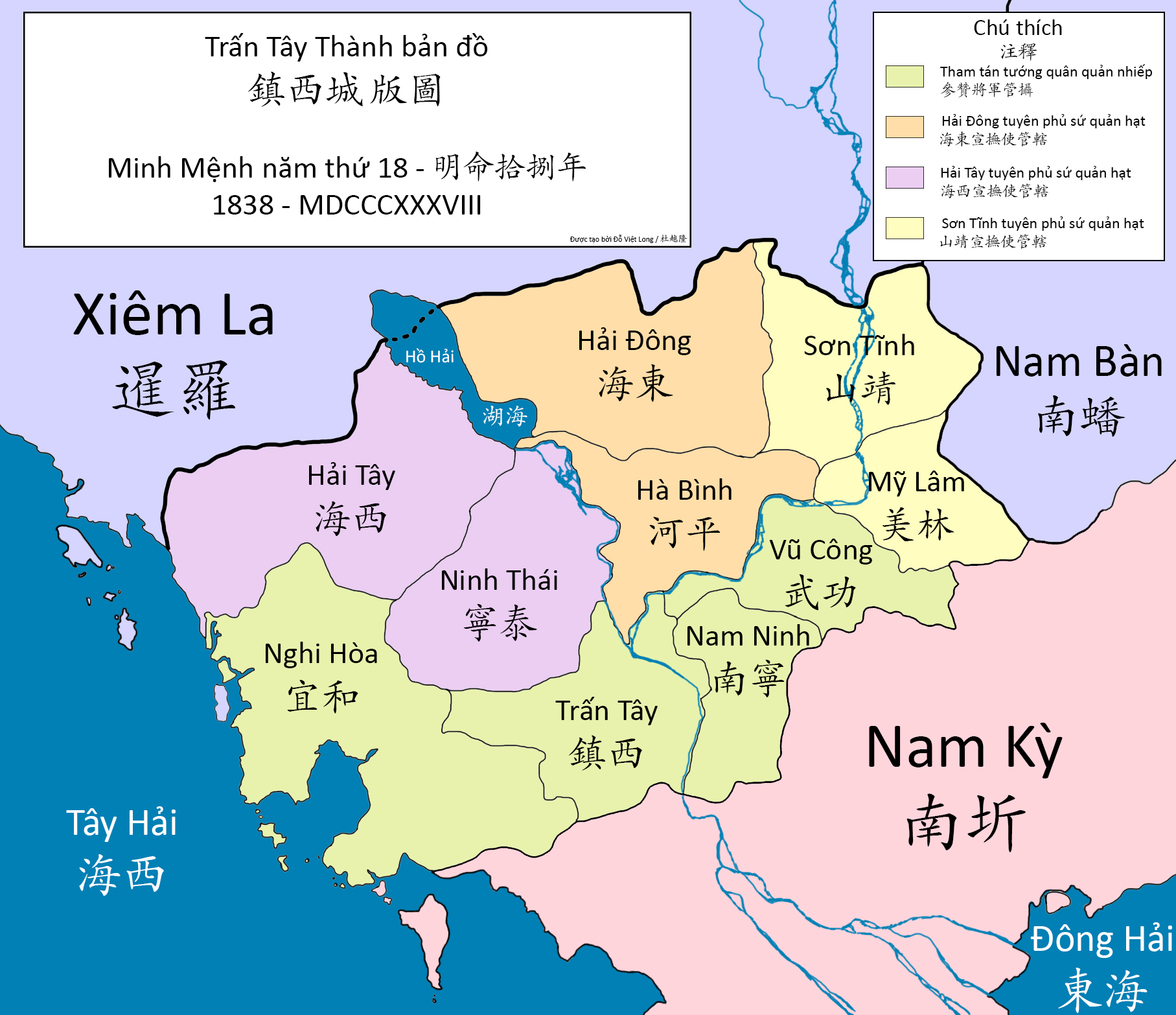
Provincial government reform of Trấn Tây in 1840 redivided Cambodia into ten districts, four under direct central administration, two each under governors of Hải Tây (Pursat) Hải Đông (Kampong Thom) and Sơn Tĩnh (Sambok).

The Vietnamese Emperor Minh Mạng welcomed the incoming Cambodians from Battambang with delight. In February 1840, Minh Mạng decreed that the newly arrived Cambodians classified as Tân dân (新民) or New Subjects. Minh Mạng also ordered the Trấn Tây administration to register these new subjects, give them Vietnamese surnames and exempt them from taxation and labor. Also in early 1840, Minh Mạng commanded Trấn Tây to conduct a complete survey of available manpower in Cambodia. Trương Minh Giảng proposed a reform of provincial division of Trấn Tây Cambodia, which was re-arranged into ten districts or phủ (府), each with a number of huyện (縣) or sub-districts, each of them given Sino-Vietnamese names. Four districts near the capital were put under direct jurisdiction of the central Trấn Tây government. The governors or Tuyên phủ of Hải Tây (Pursat) Hải Đông (Kampong Thom) and Sơn Tĩnh (Sambok) were given two districts each. The census revealed available manpower of 40,000 men in Trấn Tây Cambodia.

In March 1840, Dương Văn Phong the Tham tán Đại thần or counselor took the top three Cambodian ministers Chauvea Tolaha Long (Trà Long), Samdech Chauponhea Hu (Nhâm Vu) and Oknha Kralahom Kinh (La Kiên) to visit the Vietnamese Emperor Minh Mạng at Huế. Minh Mạng gave the three Cambodian ministers rewards and ranks in return.

With total annexation of Cambodia in mind, Minh Mạng decided to make the Cambodian royalty obsolete. In June 1840, Minh Mạng demoted the title of Queen Ang Mey of Cambodia from Queen of Cambodia (Chân Lạp quận chúa) to Princess of Mỹ Lâm (Mỹ Lâm quận chúa). Her sisters the three princesses, Ang Pen, Ang Peou and Ang Sngoun also had their titles demoted.

Minh Mạng appointed more commissioners to Trấn Tây. In July 1840, he appointed Lê Văn Đức to be the Khâm sai đại thần (欽差大臣) or Imperial Envoy to Trấn Tây Cambodia. In the Trấn Tây government, there was Trương Minh Giảng who was the Tướng quân or Governor-General, Dương Văn Phong who was the Tham tán Đại thần or counselor and Lê Văn Đức who was the Khâm sai đại thần or imperial envoy from the capital.

When Minh Mạng discovered that the Cambodians underreported the number of available manpower in Cambodia by 15,000 men, he put the guilty on the top three Cambodian ministers at Huế. In July 1840, Minh Mạng demoted the three Cambodian ministers Chauvea Tolaha Long, Samdech Chauponhea Hu and Oknha Kralahom Kinh and exiled them to Northern Vietnam. Chauvea Tolaha Long was exiled to Hanoi. Samdech Chauponhea Hu was exiled to Bắc Ninh and Oknha Kralahom Kinh to Hưng Yên.

=== Execution of Ang Pen and Dethronement of Ang Mey ===
When the Banteay Keav citadel of Phnom Penh, which contained the royal palace of King Ang Chan, was destroyed and burnt down by the Siamese in 1834, Ang Chan had not yet built himself a new palace or capital. Ang Chan instead built a temporary palace opposite of Phnom Penh on the Bassac River at Po Preah Bat, also called Slaket (La Kết). Ang Chan lived at Po Preah Bat for ten months until his death in January 1835. The Vietnamese built a new citadel called Trấn Tây at Phnom Penh in April 1835 but daughters of Ang Chan; Ang Pen (Ngọc Bợn), Ang Mey (Ngọc Vân, Queen Regnant), Ang Peou (Ngọc Thu) and Ang Sngoun (Ngọc Nguyên) resided at Po Preah Bat palace of their father, not entering Trấn Tây the citadel. Queen Ang Mey and her sisters were powerless figureheads without any actual administrative powers, which laid in the hands of the Vietnamese and Trương Minh Giảng. According to Thai chronicles, Minh Mạng proposed to marry one of his sons to Ang Mey but faced strong opposition from Cambodian Oknhas.

Neak Neang Tep, a consort of the deceased king Ang Chan and her brother Preah Angkev Ma lived at Battambang. Both Tep and Ma are children of Chaophraya Aphaiphubet Baen, the first Siam-appointed governor of Battambang. Tep was the mother of Princess Ang Pen, the eldest daughter of Ang Chan and elder sister of Queen Ang Mey. When Ang Em rebelled against Siam at Battambang and deported the inhabitants in December 1839, Tep and Ma did not go with Ang Em but stayed in Battambang. Ma sent his younger brother named Mao to go with Ang Em to Phnom Penh, pretending to join the prince's entourage. Mao then delivered a secret letter to Princess Ang Pen at Po Preah Bat. Her uncle, Preah Angkev Ma, wrote to Ang Pen, urging her to flee from Phnom Penh to join her mother in Battambang. The plan to take Ang Pen to Battambang was oversaw by the Cambodian minister Samdech Chauponhea Hu.

In July 1840, Dương Quan Thảo, a spy of Trương Minh Giảng in Pursat, discovered the plot to move Ang Pen to Battambang and informed the Governor-General at Phnom Penh. Trương Minh Giảng conducted the investigation, discovered the plot and arrested Mao in Phnom Penh. Trương Minh Giảng reported this incident to Minh Mạng at Huế. The Vietnamese Emperor was furious as this was his last straw. Minh Mạng commanded Trương Minh Giảng to charge Ang Pen and Mao with sedition. Lê Văn Đức the new imperial investigator arrived in Phnom Penh on 14 August 1840.

On the fateful evening of 23 August 1840, Trương Minh Giảng held a celebration banquet for the newly arrived Lê Văn Đức at his residence in the Trấn Tây citadel in Phnom Penh, which all the Cambodian Oknhas and the four Vietnamese princesses were compelled to attend. Trương Minh Giảng also had his men surround the place. In front of the whole audience, Giảng made a shocking declaration that Princess Ang Pen had been in sedition, planning to escape to Battambang to join her mother and her uncle with the help of her another uncle named Mao. Giảng declared that Ang Pen would be held for trial and three other princesses Ang Mey, Ang Peou and Ang Sngoun were to be exiled to Saigon. This event shocked the Cambodian nobles, who saw their royalty helplessly punished and exiled by the Vietnamese. Next day, on August 24, the three princesses were sent away from Phnom Penh. As Somdech Chauponhea Hu, who had already been in exile in Bắc Ninh, was implicated in Ang Pen's plot so his son, his wife, his brother Oknha Reachea Sneha the governor of Sambok and his friend Oknha Montrey Sneha the governor of Kampong Siem were all arrested.

Princess Ang Pen was found guilty of sedition against Vietnam but the Vietnamese could not execute her in Cambodia lest the Cambodians would arise. In August 1840, Ang Pen was secretly carried off to Vĩnh Long in Southern Vietnam, where she was executed by drowning in the Mekong. Execution of Ang Pen was conducted in utmost secrecy. The Cambodians did not know about her fate until much later. Three other princesses; Ang Mey, Ang Peou and Ang Sngoun, were exiled to Saigon, where they were given rice and money as yearly stipend.

== First Phase: September–November 1840 ==
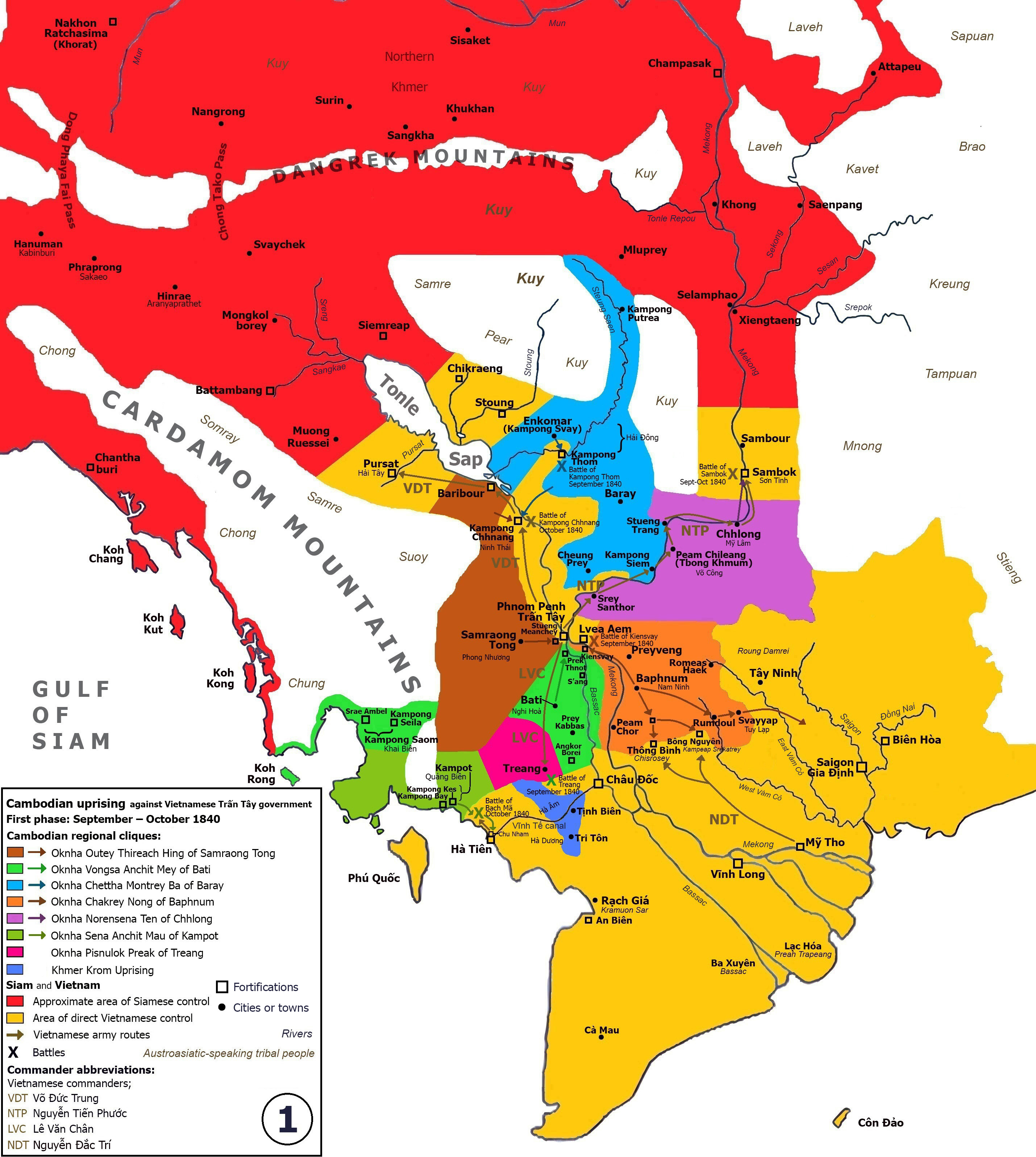
Cambodian uprising against Trấn Tây government; First phase: September–October 1840 Details about Cambodian regional cliques taken from Thai Archives of the Vietnamese army during the reign of Rama III (in Thai). Cambodian regional cliques: Oknha Outey Thireach Hing of Samraong Tong Oknha Vongsa Anchit Mey of Bati of Southwestern Cambodia Oknha Chettha Montrey Ba of Baray of Kampong Svay area Oknha Chakrey Nong of Ba Phnum of Southeastern Cambodia Oknha Norensena Ten of Chhlong of Eastern Cambodia on Mekong Khmer Krom uprising in Tịnh Biên and Thất Sơn Mountains

The first phase of Cambodian uprising against Vietnamese rule began in September 1840. In initial stages, the Cambodian Oknha leaders sprang up in different towns across Trấn Tây Cambodia, surprisingly cooperative in their united front against Vietnam despite not having a single unified leader. The movement coalesced into regional cliques. The Siamese were still unable to support this nascent anti-Vietnamese Cambodian movement because Siamese control was initially restricted to Northwestern Cambodia. The Cambodians found themselves with inferior weaponry, supplies and training against the professionally trained Vietnamese units so they instead engaged in guerilla warfare, avoiding facing the Vietnamese in open battles but rather ambushing and retreating into the forests. General Khmer uprising against Vietnamese rule allowed the Siamese under Chaophraya Bodindecha to conduct offensives into Kampong Thom and Pursat in November 1840, shifting into the second phase, during which the Siamese began to support the rebelling Khmer Oknhas.

=== Beginning of the Uprising ===
The Cambodians were upset and angered by Vietnam's treatment of their royalty, whose fate were unknown to them. Even though the Cambodian Queen Regnant Ang Mey had no actual powers, she had essential ceremonial role of conferring titles, honors and dignity on the Cambodian Oknha nobles. Without the royalty, the root of Cambodian nobility would be threatened as there would be no one to affirm the ranks and honors of the Oknhas. For the Vietnamese, the Cambodian princesses were mere officials under Emperor Minh Mạng but for the Cambodians they were sacred royalty. General resentment for Vietnamese policies in Trấn Tây Cambodia incurred the Khmers to arise against the Vietnamese rule. The Cambodians viewed the Vietnamese as extinguishing Cambodian monarchy, Theravada Buddhism and traditional Khmer institutions. Vietnamese policies in Cambodia, regardless of intentions, struck at the foundation of Cambodian identity.

By taking away Cambodian royalty, the Vietnamese assumed that they would have more control over Cambodia but the powers actually laid in the hands of the Oknha provincial governors, who had been exercising real authorities in conscripting and mobilization of Khmer men on behalf of the Cambodian king. These Oknhas derived their status from Cambodian monarchy, who appointed and affirmed their titles and the Vietnamese taking away the royalty threatened the Cambodian Oknha nobility as a whole. The Vietnamese also did not manage to control these local Oknhas, who were sometimes indistinguishable from local strongmen.

On 3 September 1840, Oknha Outey Thireach Hing (Tùng Hiên) the Cambodian governor of Samraong Tong (forty kilometers to the southwest of Phnom Penh) fled into the jungles to insurrect against the Trấn Tây government. To prevent the local Khmer population to follow suit, Trương Minh Giảng sent pro-Vietnamese Cambodian official Oknha Srei Thommea Thireach to take control of Samraong Tong. Four days later, on September 7, Oknha Vongsa Anchit Mey (Đào Vân) the governor of Bati (thirty kilometers to the south of Phnom Penh) also fled into the jungles to revolt. Trương Minh Giảng sent Oknha Akkareach Prom to pacify Bati but Oknha Akkareach instead joined Oknha Mey in rebellion against the Trấn Tây regime.

On 8 September 1840, the Trấn Tây citadel sent out Cambodian–Vietnamese forces to put down the insurrection of Oknha Vongsa Anchit Mey of Bati. The Trấn Tây forces and the rebel forces clashed at Preak Touch to the south of Phnom Penh, during which the rebels prevailed. After his victory at Preak Touch, Oknha Mey sent letters to other governors in Southwestern Cambodia including Oknha Thibes Sangkream Ke the governor of Kampong Saom, Oknha Sena Anchit Mau the governor of Kampot, Oknha Pisnulok Preak the governor of Treang and Oknha Chey Youtthea Ma the governor of Prey Kabbas, encouraging all of the governors to arise against the Vietnamese Trấn Tây regime.

=== Uprising of Oknha Chet in Kampong Svay ===
In Cambodian towns under Vietnamese rule, there were usually separate Khmer and Vietnamese quarters. In Hải Đông district, the Khmer headquarter was at Kampong Svay, while the Vietnamese headquarter was at Kampong Thom. On 7 September 1840, the Siam-backed Oknha Chet, a Cambodian official in Baray, rallied the whole Khmer population of Kampong Svay district, including the towns of Kampong Svay, Baray, Cheung Prey, Kampong Siem and Steung Trang to arise against the Vietnamese regime and lynch Vietnamese people in the area. The whole Vietnamese bureaucracy and also the pro-Vietnamese Cambodian clique in the area had to flee to Srey Sonthor. Oknha Chet then went to join Oknha Dechou Ros (Bồn Đột) the governor of Kampong Svay, where he met delegates of the pro-Siamese Cambodian Prince Ang Duong. The uprising of Oknha Chet and Oknha Dechou Ros in Kampong Svay–Baray district was encouraged and endorsed by the Siamese of Battambang and Siemreap. Chaophraya Bodindecha even made Oknha Chet the claiming Chauvea Tolaha or Prime Minister of Cambodia, though this claim was not affirmed by any Khmer rulers. Oknha Pechdechou the governor of Cheung Prey and Oknha Montrey Sneha the governor of Kampong Siem were loyal to Vietnam so they were expelled by Oknha Chet from their towns and took refuge in Phnom Penh.

Oknha Chet and Okha Dechou Ros of Kampong Svay rallied 1,000 Khmer men in the Kampong Svay district to attack Kampong Thom, the Vietnamese headquarter of the district, about fifteen kilometers to the southeast of Kampong Svay. The Tuyên phủ of Kampong Thom Trần Văn Thông and the Lãnh binh commander Hoàng Phước Lợi defended Kampong Thom against Khmer attackers. Oknha Chet and the Khmers retreated. Trần Văn Thông then sent Hoàng Phước Lợi out to pursue the Khmers. However, Oknha Chet ambushed the Vietnamese and killed Hoàng Phước Lợi. Oknha Chet then established his clique over the Kampong Svay area, with the Vietnamese restricted to Kampong Thom, supported by Siam.

=== Defection of Oknha Surkealok to Siam ===
Pursat or Hải Tây was a regional administrative center in Trấn Tây Cambodia, where a Vietnamese Tuyên phủ governor was appointed. Pursat was one of the five chief cities of Cambodia, whose governors had high status of Sdach Tranh. Pursat held jurisdiction over the southwestern shore of Tonle Sap Lake and its governors held the title Oknha Surkealok. Pursat connected to the Siam-controlled Battambang via Moung Reussei. On 11 September 1840, Oknha Surkealok Muk (Sa Mộc) the Sdach Tranh governor of Pursat took his family to walk from Pursat to Battambang, where he met the Siamese grand commander Chaophraya Bodindecha. Oknha Surkealok Muk complained to Bodindecha that the Khmers in Pursat had been suffering from Vietnamese rule and Surkealok Muk himself had been in an uneasy row with the Vietnamese Tuyên phủ of Pursat Nguyễn Song Thành. Surkealok Muk told Bodindecha that he had been rallying the local Khmers of Pursat to support the Siamese and if Bodindecha marched from Battambang to Pursat, the local Khmer would come to aid the Siamese.

Earlier in 1832, an Oknha Surkealok governor of Pursat named Kas had rebelled against the pro-Vietnamese King Ang Chan. Oknha Surkealok Kas fled to take refuge in Bangkok. Defection of Oknha Surkealok Kas to Siam in 1832 was one to the main causes of the Siamese invasion of Cambodia in 1833 and defection of Oknha Surkealok Muk the Pursat governor to the Siamese in September 1840 would also be one of the precipitating events of another Siamese invasion of Cambodia two months later in November 1840. Bodindecha brought Oknha Surkealok Kas the former governor of Pursat with him to Battambang. After the defection of Oknha Surkealok Muk to Siam, the Vietnamese appointed Oknha Vibolreach Long as the new Khmer governor of Pursat. However, Oknha Vibolreach Long soon rebelled and joined Oknha Muk on the Siamese side.

=== Uprising of Oknha Chakrey Nong ===
On 11 September 1840, Oknha Reachdechea Nong and Oknha Norea Thuppedey Mouk gathered 4,000 able-bodied Khmer men in the southern vicinity of Phnom Penh and took position at Kien Svay, just fifteen kilometers to the southeast of Phnom Penh on the Mekong, where they were joined by Oknha Thommeadecho Meas (Ba Mạt) the Sdach Tranh governor of Ba Phnum. Oknha Reachdechea Nong then declared himself a Chakrey Minister of War and Oknha Norea Thuppedey declared himself Kralahom Minister of Navy, without any affirmation from Cambodian royalty. The self-proclaimed Oknha Chakrey Nong (An Hồng) emerged powerful, said to take control over all area to the east of Phnom Penh. At his instigation, the Khmer people generally arose and insurrected to lynch and kill the Vietnamese immigrants in the whole Eastern Cambodia, causing an exodus of Vietnamese people to take refuge in Định Tường province in Mỹ Tho.

Next day, on September 12, Oknha Chakrey Nong sent letters to Oknha Outey Thireach Hing of Samraong Tong and Oknha Vongsa Anchit Mey of Bati, who had arisen to the west of Phnom Penh, urging them to cooperate in a joint attack on the Trấn Tây citadel. However, Oknha Hing and Oknha Mey disagreed, saying that they should not attack the citadel in wet season with high water levels and they should wait for the dry season. The Vietnamese, however, did not wait for the dry season. On 29 September 1840, Trương Minh Giảng sent Oknha Veang Tom, the pro-Vietnamese Cambodian Minister of Palace Affairs, to lead the Cambodian–Vietnamese forces of 2,500 men and 70 war vessels to attack Oknha Chakrey Nong and his clique at Kien Svay. Oknha Chakrey Nong prevailed in the Battle of Kien Svay, repelling Oknha Veang Tom back to Phnom Penh.

Two weeks later, on October 12, Trương Minh Giảng again sent 80 war vessels to attack Chakrey Nong at Kien Svay, during which Chakrey Nong prevailed for the second time, pursuing the Trấn Tây forces to Lvea Aem opposite of Phnom Penh on the eastern river bank. However, due to the lack of weapons, Chakrey Nong could not attack the Trấn Tây citadel right away. Oknha Chakrey Nong then took position at Ba Phnum, where his ally Oknha Thommeadecho Meas was the governor, while Oknha Kralahom Mouk took position at Prey Veng, all in Southeastern Cambodia.

Oknha Chakrey Nong then sent Oknha Thommeadecho Meas the governor of Ba Phnum and to lead Khmer forces to attack Thông Bình (in modern Đồng Tháp province) and Bông Nguyên (in modern Long An province) to the southeast in the upper reaches of Định Tường province, the area that was called Kampeap Sreka Trey by the Khmers, killing 90 Vietnamese people there. The Vietnamese people in Southeastern Cambodia, facing Khmer harassment, fled into Định Tường province. In October 1840, the Bố chính governor of Định Tường Nguyễn Đắc Trí at Mỹ Tho led 1,500 Cochinchinese men to repel the Khmers from Thông Bình, Bông Nguyên and advanced towards Ba Phnum. Oknha Lu Chakrey Pang the governor of Romduol and Svayyap (Tuy Lạp) originally helped the Vietnamese to fight against Chakrey Nong's clique but later defected to join his Khmer comrades. Nguyễn Đắc Trí sent his vanguard forces forward only to be ambushed and massacred by the Khmers. Nguyễn Đắc Trí sent a false report to Minh Mạng, claiming that he had secured a victory over the Khmers. When his fabricated report was exposed, he was dismissed from his prison and was subjected to life imprisonment for lying to the Vietnamese Emperor.

=== Uprising in Southwestern Cambodia ===
Oknha Pisnulok Preak the Sdach Tranh governor of Treang rebelled against the Vietnamese Trấn Tây government but the Vietnamese soon laid siege on Treang. The Oknha and his town nearly fell to the Vietnamese and his fellow Cambodian Oknhas fought to relief the Vietnamese siege on his town. The Khmers were able to break off the Vietnamese siege on Treang on September 21 but the Vietnamese took away Oknha Preak as captive. The Khmers pursued to rescue Oknha Preak and met the retreating Vietnamese at Kampong Prang where, according to Thai chronicles, the Khmers kill half of the Vietnamese forces.

The Vietnamese imperial court kept punishment of the Cambodian princesses a secret affair until they began to inform its officials. In Kampot, like other Cambodian towns under Vietnamese rule, there were separate Cambodian and Vietnamese headquarters. The Vietnamese headquarter in Kampot, called Quảng Biên, composed of two forts of Kampong Bay and Kampong Kes built at the mouth of Teuk Chhou River. On 2 September 1840, the Vietnamese governor of Kampot was informed by the imperial court that the three princesses had been exiled to Saigon and the Princess Ang Pen was held in Phnom Penh for investigation (it was not revealed that Ang Pen had actually been executed by that time). The Vietnamese governor of Kampot then told Oknha Sena Anchit Mau the governor of Kampot about the news, upsetting the whole Khmer officialdom in Kampot. On 15 September 1840, Oknha Sena Anchit Mau and the Cambodians of Kampot arose, attacking and seizing the towns of Kampong Bay and Kampong Kes in Kampot, the Vietnamese headquarters, lynching and murdering the Vietnamese in the towns.

On 29 September 1840, Lê Quang Huyên the Vietnamese governor of Hà Tiên sent 500 Vietnamese men and 30 war vessels to attack Kampot in retaliation. The Vietnamese forces from Hà Tiên reached Kampot on October 9 as Oknha Mau defended his town. The battle was fought for three days from October 9 to October 11. The Khmers of Kampot prevailed but with great difficulty. Oknha Vongsa Anchit Mey of Bati had to send some forces to help Oknha Mau of Kampot to repel the Vietnamese.

Oknha Vongsa Anchit Mey of Bati sent a letter to his uncle Oknha Chey Youtthea Ma the governor of Prey Kabbas, urging his uncle to arise and overthrow the Vietnamese yoke. On 3 October 1840, Oknha Ma led the Khmers of Prey Kabbas to arise and lynch the Vietnamese in his town. Oknha Chey Youtthea Ma then resigned from his governorship of Prey Kabbas, allowing Oknha Chey Youtthea Ton to take over.

As the Vietnamese came from Hà Tiên, Oknha Sena Anchit Mau sent his Khmer forces of 2000 men under Oknha Youtthea Sena Tieng to attack Hà Tiên in late October 1840 in retaliation. In the same time, the Vietnamese in Hà Tiên sent Hà Văn Củ to bring forces to attack Kampot. The Cambodians and the Vietnamese met along the way at Bạch Mã Mountain in modern Kep province, leading to a battle that the Khmers prevailed. Cambodian victory allowed Oknha Youtthea Sena Tieng to continue his Khmer army to attack Hà Tiên itself.

Meanwhile, in the Vietnamese An Giang province, there were Vietnamese headquarter at Châu Đốc and Khmer headquarter at Tịnh Biên, called Moat Chruk, which situated between Hà Tiên and Châu Đốc. When Oknha Tieng from Kampot was attacking Hà Tiên, Khmer Krom leaders in Tịnh Biên town Oknha Reachea Setthey (Kỳ La) the Khmer governor of Moat Chruk and Oknha Athikvongsa Tot (Việt Tốt) the governor of Bassac (Ba Xuyên) arose in October 1840, killing local Vietnamese officials. Lê Quang Huyên sent another Khmer Krom official Chân Triết serving under Hà Tiên to suppress the Khmer Krom rebellion at Tịnh Biên but Chân Triết joined his fellow Khmer Krom dissidents at Tịnh Biên instead.

Oknha Youtthea Sena Tieng led his Khmer forces from Kampot to attack Hà Tiên, seizing the Chu Nham fort. During this Khmer attack on Hà Tiên, the Vietnamese suffered casualties as many were killed. The Vietnamese tried to retake the fort but the bridge collapsed during the Vietnamese assault. Hà Văn Củ was injured. With critical situation in Hà Tiên for the Vietnamese, Dương Văn Phong the Tổng đốc An Hà or governor of An Giang and Hà Tiên brought forces from Châu Đốc to relief the Khmer attack on Hà Tiên. Though struggling, Dương Văn Phong and Lê Quang Huyên eventually managed to push the attacking Khmers out of Hà Tiên. Oknha Youtthea Sena from Kampot was killed during this battle at Hà Tiên.

Lê Quang Huyên sent Phạm Văn Sĩ to retake Kampong Seila, the Vietnamese headquarter in Kampong Saom and sent Mai Văn Tích to attack Kampot. Phạm Văn Sĩ from Kampong Saom and Mai Văn Tích from Hà Tiên then converged on Kampot, successfully retaking the Vietnamese fort of Kampong Bay in Kampot, prompting Oknha Sena Anchit Mau of Kampot to flee and took position elsewhere. This Vietnamese success turned the tide of war in favor of the Vietnamese on the Kampot–Hà Tiên corridor. The Cambodians of Kampot were poorly armed and untrained, having mostly blades and sticks, while the Vietnamese were trained and had muskets.

=== Vietnamese reaction ===
Oknha Outey Thireach Hing of Samraong Tong, Oknha Vongsa Anchit Mey of Bati, Oknha Chey Youtthea Ma the governor of Prey Kabbas, Oknha Pisnulok Preak of Treang, Oknha Sena Anchit Mau of Kampot, Oknha Thibes Sangkream Ke of Kampong Saom and the clique of the self-proclaimed Oknha Chakrey Nong including Oknha Thommadechou Meas the governor of Ba Phnum all rebelled against the Vietnamese rule in Cambodia. These towns were in the vicinity of Phnom Penh and had been under direct administration of the Trấn Tây government. These Oknhas were the first to be affected by Vietnamese government reforms to integrate them and to strip their powers. They were also the first to be informed of the news of Vietnamese treatment of Khmer royalty. When Lê Văn Đức reported the general Cambodian rebellion to Minh Mạng in September 1840, the Vietnamese Emperor Minh Mạng became furious.

The Vietnamese were also surprised by the coordination among the Oknhas governors in their military actions. In early stages, this movement lacked a single unified leader. The Vietnamese suspected Siamese instigation of this Cambodian uprising, which was partly true. Some rebelling Oknhas, most notably Oknha Chet of Baray, had apparent Siamese endorsement. However, the Siamese efforts concentrated on Pursat and Kampong Svay, not penetrating into the vicinity area of Phnom Penh and Southern Cambodia, where the Oknhas seemed to operate independently of Siamese influences until mid-November 1840 when they began to accept Siamese support and rally to Ang Duong as their candidate for Cambodian kingship.

Since 1836, Trương Minh Giảng had been concurrently holding the positions of Trấn Tây tướng quân or Governor-General of Cambodia and Tổng đốc An Hà or governor of An Giang and Hà Tiên provinces. With the advent of Cambodian rebellion in September 1840, Minh Mạng moved Dương Văn Phong from the position of Tham tán Đại thần or deputy Governor-General to the Tổng đốc An Hà governor of An Giang and Hà Tiên, while Lê Văn Đức was made Tham tán Đại thần or deputy of Trấn Tây instead. When the Khmers attacked Hà Tiên in October 1840, Minh Mạng sent Phạm Văn Điển as Kinh lược đại thần (經略大臣) or Military Strategist of Trấn Tây in November 1840.

Trương Minh Giảng and the Trấn Tây government faced manpower shortage problem as they could only rely on the Vietnamese and few loyal Khmers to fight for them so Trương Minh Giảng asked Emperor Minh Mạng to send more troops to suppress the rebellion in Cambodia. Minh Mạng commanded that 10,000 Southern Vietnamese military men from Cochinchina sent into Cambodia. The first batch arrived, composing of 1,000 men from An Giang (Châu Đốc), 1,000 men from Vĩnh Long (Vĩnh Long), 1,000 men from Gia Định (Saigon) and 500 men from Định Tường (Mỹ Tho) with total of 3,500 men. Second batch arrived, composing of 1,500 men from Gia Định, 2,000 men from Vĩnh Long, 1,000 men from Định Tường, 500 men from An Giang and 500 men from Biên Hòa with total of 5,500 men. Minh Mạng also told the Vietnamese commissioners in Cambodia not to fight every rebelling Oknhas but to focus on holding vital regional centers of Hải Đông (Kampong Thom) and Hải Tây (Pursat), which bordered Siam-controlled territories.

As Oknha Surkealok Muk the governor of Pursat had defected to the Siamese at Battambang, Trương Minh Giảng sent commander Võ Đức Trung to lead Khmer–Vietnamese from Phnom Penh to take control of Pursat. Võ Đức Trung marched along the southwestern shore of Tonle Sap Lake and fought against the rebelling Oknhas; Oknha Chet and Oknha Sena Reachea Sangkream the governor of Baribour, near Kampong Chhnang. Võ Đức Trung prevailed over the Khmers. who fled into the jungles. Võ Đức Trung then proceeded to take control of Pursat.

Not all of the Cambodian officials rebelled against Vietnamese rule. There were some Khmer officials who still "dressed in Vietnamese costume and fought for the Vietnamese". These included Oknha Yomreach Ruot (Nhâm Trật) the Minister of Justice, Oknha Veang Tom (Ốc Tâm) the Minister of Palace, Oknha Srei Thommea Thireach, Oknha Reachea Sneha the governor of Sambok, Oknha Pechdechou the governor of Cheung Prey and Oknha Montrey Sneha the governor of Kampong Siem, though the pro-Vietnamese Khmer governors had been dislodged from their cities. With the widespread of lynching on Vietnamese people in Cambodia, only Phnom Penh and Sambok still stood as the fortresses of the pro-Vietnamese clique. Oknha Yomreach Ruot pretended to be sick and sneaked out to join the resistance in Tboung Khmum. The Vietnamese then decided not to trust any of the pro-Vietnamese Khmer officials and Oknea Veang Tom was exiled to Vĩnh Long.

=== Siamese support to the uprising ===
The Siam-backed Oknha Chet of Baray, who had instigated the general Khmer uprising against Vietnamese rule in Kampong Svay area, sent letters to the rebelling Cambodian governors Oknha Outey Thireach Hing of Samraong Tong, Oknha Vongsa Anchit Mey of Bati, Oknha Pisnulok Preak of Treang, Oknha Chey Youtthea Ton of Prey Kabbas, Oknha Sena Anchit Mau of Kampot and Oknha Thibes Sangkream Ke on 26 October 1840. In the letters, Oknha Chet asserted his dominance over other rebelling Oknhas as the main agent working for Siam in Cambodia, declaring that the Siamese commander Bodindecha had made him Chauvea Tolaha or Prime Minister of Cambodia. Though the Oknhas did not care about Chet, his letters made the other rebelling Oknhas aware of potential Siamese support to their cause. The Cambodian uprising suffered from inferior weaponry and supply, becoming exhausted and they would soon realize they needed Siamese aid against the Vietnamese.

With the arrival of dry season in early November 1840, the rebelling Oknhas moved their forces to encamp at the outskirts of Phnom Penh to enclose on the Trấn Tây citadel;

- Oknha Outey Thireach Hing of Samraong Tong sent Oknha Sena Reachea Sangkream of Baribour to bring 2,600 Khmer men to station at Stueng Meanchey to the southeast of Phnom Penh.
- Oknha Vongsa Anchit Mey of Bati sent Oknha Akkareach Prom to bring 2,200 Khmer men to station at Prek Thnot to the south of Phnom Penh (modern Ta Khmau).
- Oknha Chey Youtthea Ton the incumbent governor of Prey Kabbas sent Oknha Chey Youtthea Ma the resigned governor of Prey Kabbas to bring 950 Khmer to encamp in the outskirts of Phnom Penh

During this Khmer enclosing on the Trấn Tây citadel in Phnom Penh, Chaophraya Bodindecha sent Phraya Ratchanikun to bring Lao and Northern Khmer forces of 13,000 men to Kampong Svay on 3 November 1840 to attack the Vietnamese at Chikraeng and Stoung on the northern shores of Tonle Sap lake, with the aid from Oknha Dechou Ros the Cambodian governor of Kampong Svay. On November 10, Chaophraya Bodindecha and Phra Narinyotha Nong the vice-governor of Battambang sent letters to the Oknhas of Southern Cambodia, urging them to attack the Vietnamese. On November 16, Bodindecha sent Phra Phirenthorathep Kham, son of Chaophraya Nakhon Ratchasima Thong-in the governor of Nakhon Ratchasima (Bodindecha's brother-in-law), to lead 2,788 Lao men to attack the Vietnamese-held Pursat.

After receiving the letters from the Siamese, the Southern Cambodian Oknhas allied themselves with Siam, sending separate flattering letters on 17 November 1840 to Bodindecha;

- Oknha Outey Thireach Hing of Samraong sent a letter to Bodindecha, professing himself to be a Siamese subject, lamenting that the Cambodian uprising movement lacked a single unified leader and wished that the Prince Ang Duong could be one.
- Oknha Sena Anchit Mau of Kampot sent a letter to Bodindecha, complaining that he had been struggling to resist Vietnamese attacks from Hà Tiên due to his lack of weapons and supplies, asking for Ang Duong to bring forces to aid Kampot.
- Oknha Vongsa Anchit Mey of Bati, Oknha Chey Youtthea Ton of Prey Kabbas and Oknha Thibes Sangkream Ke of Kampong Saom wrote a joint letter to Bodindecha, asking Bodindecha to release Ang Duong to be the leader of Khmer resistance against Vietnamese rule and expressing their wishes that Cambodia would be like during the reign of Ang Eng and the regency of Chauvea Tolaha Pok in the 1790s, when Siam dominated Cambodia.

Among the Southern Cambodian Oknhas, only the self-proclaimed Oknha Chakrey Nong and his vast clique in Southeastern Cambodia remained independent, not submitting to the Siamese. Confident of local Khmer support to his cause, Bodindecha sent his son Phra Phromborrirak and his brother-in-law Chaophraya Nakhon Ratchasima to bring Lao–Siamese forces of 2,445 men to attack Pursat on November 20. Next day, on 21 November 1840, Bodindecha himself marched the main Siamese forces of 3,520 men to attack Pursat. The Khmer Oknhas chose Oknha Surkealok Muk and Oknha Vibolreach Long as their representatives to formally deliver eighteen letters, requesting the Siamese to release Prince Ang Duong to be the leader of this anti-Vietnamese movement, to Bodindecha at Pursat.

== Second Phase: December 1840–January 1841 ==
Second phase of Cambodian uprising against Vietnamese rule began with Siamese offensives into Kampong Thom and Pursat in November 1840 to aid the Khmers to arise against the Vietnamese Trấn Tây regime. Upon learning about the Khmer uprising, Chaophraya Bodindecha the Siamese supreme commander presented Siam as being supportive to Cambodian cause. Facing the Vietnamese, who had superior weaponry and training, the Khmers realized they needed Siamese support to achieve their goal of ending Vietnamese rule in Cambodia. The Siamese–Vietnamese War of November 1840–January 1841 was not conclusive. Trương Minh Giảng the Vietnamese Governor-General of Trấn Tây Cambodia successfully repelled the Siamese from Kampong Thom but Bodindecha also expelled the Vietnamese from Pursat. As Siamese–Vietnamese conflict over Cambodia shifted to diplomatic front, death of the Vietnamese Emperor Minh Mạng in January 1841 and ascension of the new Vietnamese ruler Thiệu Trị shifted Vietnam's policy towards Cambodia from stringent control to a more practical, reconciliatory approach. Chaophraya Bodindecha brought the pro-Siamese Khmer prince Ang Duong from Bangkok to Battambang in early February 1841 to rally local Khmer support to pro-Siamese clique in attempt to establish Siamese domination over Cambodia, leading to the third phase when the Siamese and the Vietnamese set up rival courts in Cambodia. The uprising also spilled over into Southern Vietnam, which had been inhabited by the Khmers and incorporated into Vietnam, where the Khmer Kroms of Cochinchina arose against Vietnam in concert with their peers in Cambodia.

=== Cambodian–Vietnamese War on Tây Ninh ===
In 1836, Trương Minh Giảng established Tây Ninh province over the land sparsely inhabited by the Khmers called Roung Damrei (Khmer: រោងដំរី), which was put under the administration of Gia Định province rather than the Trấn Tây province. In September 1840, the self-proclaimed Oknha Chakrey Nong, his allies Oknha Kralahom Mouk and Oknha Thommeadecho Meas the governor of Ba Phnum established their clique over the area to the east of Phnom Penh, corresponding to the Nam Ninh district. Chakrey Nong repelled attacks from the Trấn Tây citadel at Kien Svay. Oknha Chakrey Nong then settled in Ba Phnum as his headquarter, while Oknha Kralahon Mouk went to Prey Veng. In October 1840, Oknha Chakrey Nong sent Oknha Thommeadecho the governor of Ba Phnum and Oknha Lu Chakrey Pang the governor of Rumduol to attack Thông Bình (in modern Đồng Tháp province) and Bông Nguyên (in modern Long An province) in the upper reaches of Định Tường province, called Kampeap Sreka Trey by the Khmers. The Vietnamese Bố chính governor of Định Tường Nguyễn Đắc Trí from Mỹ Tho led 1,500 Southern Vietnamese men to repel the Khmers from Thông Bình, Bông Nguyên and invaded Ba Phnum but was ambushed by the Khmers, resulting in Vietnamese defeat and casualties. Nguyễn Đắc Trí sent a false report to the Vietnamese Emperor Minh Mạng, was caught and punished. Trương Văn Uyển replaced Nguyễn Đắc Trí as the Bố chính governor of Định Tường.

In October 1840, Oknha Chakrey Nong sent another 1,000 Khmer men to attack Quang Hoá in the lower reaches of Tây Ninh province near Saigon. Nguyễn Văn Trọng the governor of Saigon, the Tổng đốc Định Biên or governor of Gia Định and Biên Hòa provinces, sent Vietnamese troops from Saigon to repel the Khmer attack. The Khmers delivered a letter to the Vietnamese, declaring that because the Vietnamese had taken away their royalty the Princesses Ang Pen, Ang Mey, Ang Peou, Ang Sngoun and the Prince Ang Em, they had come to search for their lost five royal persons and would not stop until they found them. When Nguyễn Văn Trọng reported this letter to Minh Mạng at Huế, the Vietnamese Emperor was incensed, declaring that his punishment of the Khmer royalty was justified. In November, 500 to 700 Muslim Chams of Tbong Khmum, "all wearing white turbans on their heads", joined the debacle by attacking the upper reaches of Tây Ninh.

In November 1840, both Nguyễn Văn Trọng the governor of Saigon and Trương Văn Uyển the governor of Định Tường at Mỹ Tho marched Southern Vietnamese forces from their respective places against the Southeastern Cambodian clique of Oknha Chakrey Nong, who headquartered at Ba Phnum (Nam Ninh). The Cambodians had been employing guerilla tactics on the Vietnamese, avoiding facing the Vietnamese in open battle but instead covering themselves in the dense forests of Cambodia. Nguyễn Văn Trọng and his forces marched into the Tây Ninh province, finding the place to be covered in thick forests, where the Khmers came out to ambush and quickly disappeared. Nguyễn Văn Trọng then took position at Tây Ninh and cleared the province of the Khmer guerillas. Meanwhile, Trương Văn Uyển, with 1,300 men, marched from Bông Nguyên along the Preaek Kampong Chamlang River to attack and seize Romduol. Trương Văn Uyển sent out reconnaissance, which was ambushed and massacred by the Khmers. Trương Văn Uyển noted that the Cambodians were organized into small guerilla units of 300, 500 to 1,000 men hiding in the forests. By December, after accomplishing their tasks, Nguyễn Văn Trọng at Tây Ninh and Trương Văn Uyển at Romduol would converge to join forces to attack Oknha Chakrey Nong at Ba Phnum.

The joint Gia Định and Định Tường forces under Nguyễn Văn Trọng and Trương Văn Uyển invaded Southeastern Cambodia to attack Oknha Chakrey Nong at Ba Phnum. By late January 1841, they had reached Kampong Trabaek, only fifteen kilometers to the southeast of Ba Phnum. However, by that time, the Gia Định and Định Tường forces had become exhausted and Nguyễn Văn Trọng requested supporting troops from Trương Minh Giảng at Phnom Penh in order to conduct two-pronged attack on Ba Phnum. However, the new Vietnamese Emperor Thiệu Trị disapproved of this idea, saying that the Trấn Tây citadel had already preoccupied with the Cambodian–Siamese attacks. Thiệu Trị then considered Nguyễn Văn Trọng too old and exhausted so the Vietnamese Emperor ordered Nguyễn Văn Trọng and Trương Văn Uyển to suspend the campaign and retreated to their respective bases in Saigon and Mỹ Tho, respectively.

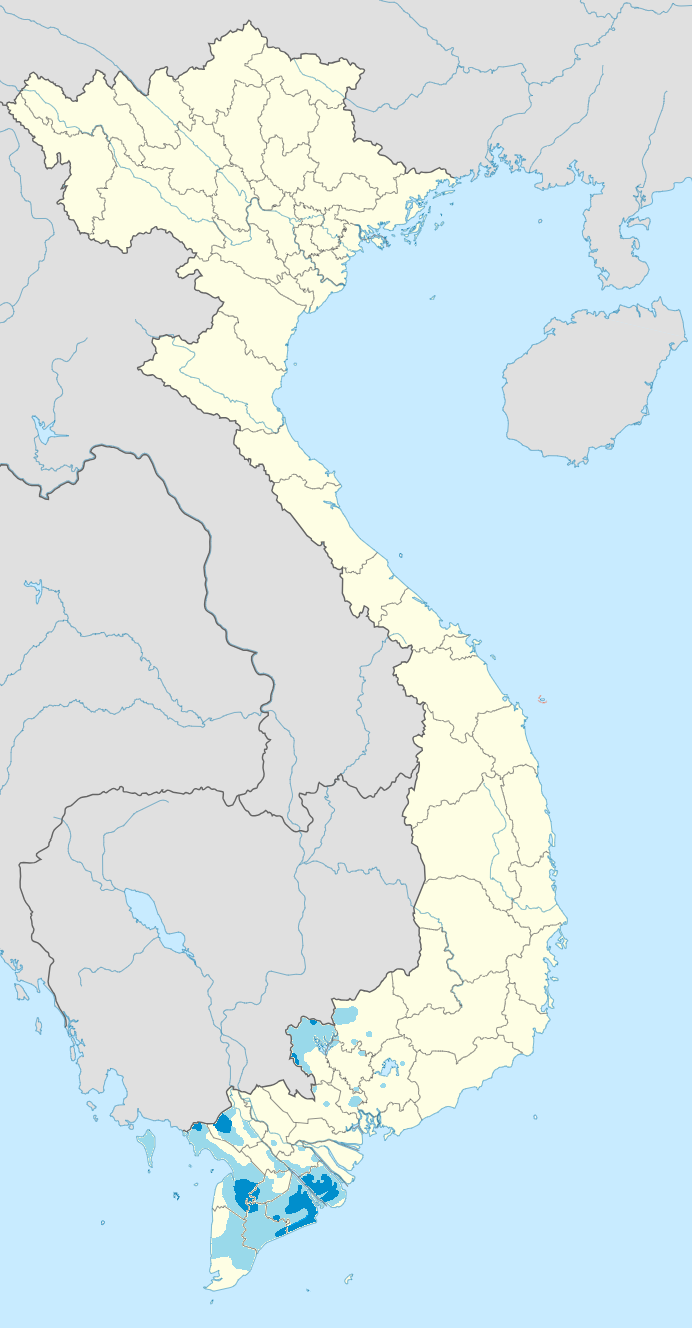
Modern distribution of Khmer Krom people in Southern Vietnam

=== Khmer Krom uprising in Kiên Giang ===
Even though Vietnam had taken control over most parts of Cochinchina by the nineteenth century through the process of Nam tiến or Southward Expansion, there were still some pockets of Cambodian towns governed by Khmer Oknha officials. The Khmers of the Mekong Delta who were incorporated into Vietnam were eventually called the Khmer Kroms. By mid-nineteenth century, there were Khmer Oknha governors in Moat Chruk (Mật Luật), Umor (Ô Môn, near Cần Thơ), Kramuon Sar (An Biên in Kiên Giang) and Bassac (Ba Thắc, modern Sóc Trăng). In 1835, Trương Minh Giảng annexed Bassac into Vietnam, establishing the Ba Xuyên district. In 1839, Vietnam annexed Moat Chruk or Mật Luật into Tây Xuyên district, annexed Umor or Ô Môn into Phong Phu district and annexed Choan Chum (Chân Thành) to establish the Hà Âm (河陰, "north of Vĩnh Tế Canal") and Hà Dương (河陽, "south of Vĩnh Tế Canal") districts.

Even since the Cambodian uprising in Kampot under Oknha Sena Anchit Mau in September 1840, there had been oscillating offensive exchanges between the Khmers of Kampot, led by Oknha Mau and the Vietnamese of Hà Tiên, led by Lê Quang Huyên the governor of Hà Tiên. Also, the Khmer Krom leaders in Tịnh Biên (Moat Chruk) Oknha Reacha Setthey (Kỳ La) and Oknha Athikvongsa Tot (Việt Tốt) insurrected against the Vietnamese rule in October 1840. Lê Quang Huyên sent out Khmer Krom leaders called Chân Triết and Hàn Biện, who had been serving the Vietnamese in An Biên (Kramuon Sar, in Kiên Giang), to attack the Khmer Krom rebels but Chân Triết and Hàn Biện ended up joining their fellow Khmer Krom leaders against Vietnam instead. The Vietnamese forces under Phạm Văn Sĩ and Mai Văn Tích retook the Vietnamese fort of Kampong Bay in Kampot in November 1840, inflicting heavy blow on the Khmer resistance in Kampot. In December 1840, Lê Quang Huyên himself marched 700 Vietnamese men to station at Kampong Bay in Kampot to take tighter control over the Cambodian Southwestern coastal region.

Chân Triết had been serving in Vietnamese bureaucracy as an official in An Biên (Kramuon Sar) for a long time. Thai record stated that the Khmer Krom leaders in Kramoun Sar were Oknha Ravidechou or Oknha Thiet and Oknha Vongsa Sangkream Meas, they should be identified as Chân Triết and Hàn Biện. Other Khmer Krom leaders mentioned in Thai record were Oknha Chey, Oknha Tham, Oknha Chun and Oknha Maong. Their names were recorded in Vietnamese Đại Nam thực lục as Thuý Sinh, Ngọc Thâm, Suy and Sốc. In December 1840, as majority of the Vietnamese forces in Hà Tiên had gone out to Kampot, Chân Triết, Hàn Biện and their Khmer Krom followers arose in Tri Tôn near the Thất Sơn or Bảy Núi Mountains. Chân Triết sent his Khmer Krom subordinates Thuý Sinh and Ngọc Thâm, who used to serve under Vietnam in Hà Tiên, to march with 2,000 Khmer Krom men to attack the Vietnamese headquarter at Rạch Giá in Kiên Giang, lynching the Vietnamese people, causing them to flee. Lê Quang Huyên, who had been in Kampot, rushed to return to Hà Tiên and set sail from Hà Tiên with 600 men to relieve Rạch Giá by sea, successfully repel the Khmer Kroms from Rạch Giá. The Khmer Kroms then retreated to Tri Tôn in the Thất Sơn Mountain.

In late December 1840, Dương Văn Phong the Tổng đốc An Hà governor of An Giang (Châu Đốc) and Hà Tiên provinces and Lê Quang Huyên the governor of Hà Tiên marched in one final offensive against the Khmer Krom rebels in Tri Tôn in the Thất Sơn Mountain around the Hà Âm and Hà Dương districts near Vĩnh Tế Canal under the leadership of Oknha Thiet or Chân Triết. Dương Văn Phong inflicted a two-pronged attack on the Khmer Kroms at Tri Tôn, assigning the colleague Lê Quang Huyên to attack Tri Tôn from another direction. From Tịnh Biên (Moat Chruk), Dương Văn Phong marched out to attack Oknha Thiet at Tri Tôn, successfully dispersing the Khmer Krom rebels and dissolving Oknha Thiet's clique, while Lê Quang Huyên captured and executed Oknha Montrey Anchit the Khmer Krom governor of Umor in battle.

As Lê Quang Huyên had left Kampot to suppress the Khmer Krom rebellion in Kiên Giang and An Giang, the Khmers of Kampot, led by Oknha Sena Anchit Mau, attacked the Vietnamese fort of Kampong Bay again on 27 December 1840. Oknha Vongsa Anchit Mey of the Bati clique also sent Khmer troops to assist Oknha Mau. On 6 January 1841, Sena Anchit Mau the Cambodian governor of Kampot was wounded during his assault on Kampong Bay and disappeared from records, presumably died afterwards. After the death of Oknha Mau, Oknha Vongsa Anchit Mey of Bati took control over the Cambodian uprising movement on the southwestern coast including Kampot and Kampong Saom.

In early January 1841, the Khmer Kroms gave a letter to Lê Quang Huyên the governor of Hà Tiên, expressing the grudges on Trương Minh Giảng the Governor-General of Trấn Tây Cambodia. The letter said that Trương Minh Giảng had been abusing Khmer people, attempting to take the Khmer princesses as his wives, sending his spy Dương Quan Thảo to conduct surveillance, creating fear and extorting money from the Khmers. Lê Quang Huyên translated the letter and sent it to the Emperor Minh Mạng at Huế, saying that the matter of Cambodia was not under his Hà Tiên jurisdiction. Minh Mạng was rather shocked by these accusations by the Khmers on Trương Minh Giảng, whom Minh Mạng had completely trusted in administrating Trấn Tây Cambodia. Minh Mạng said that there should be investigations on this matter about whether or not these accusations were true but before he could do anything the Vietnamese Emperor Minh Mạng died on 20 January 1841.

=== Siamese offensives on Kampong Thom and Pursat ===
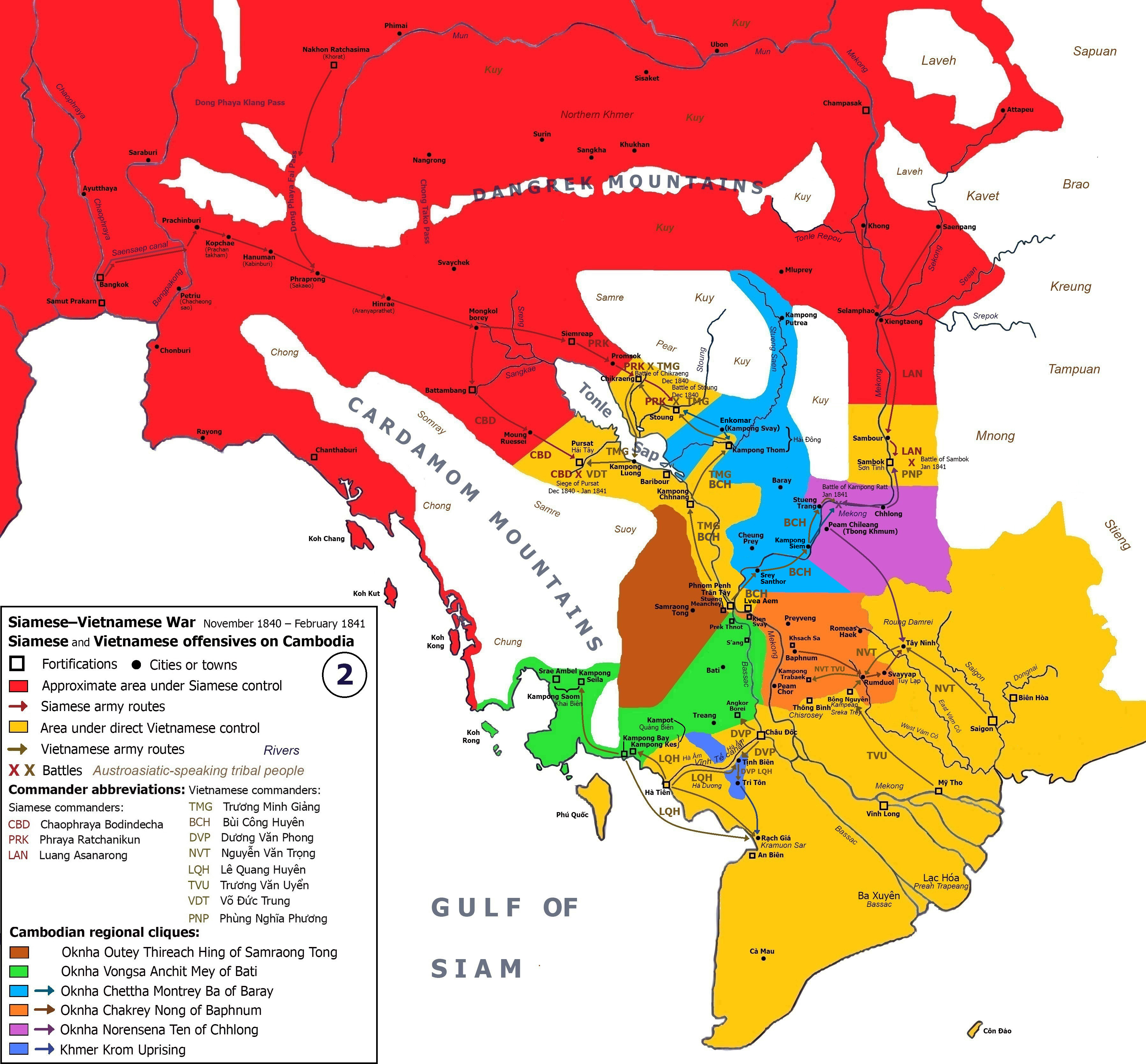
Siamese–Vietnamese War: November 1840 – January 1841 Siamese offensives against the Vietnamese in Cambodia at Pursat, Kampong Thom and Sambok in order to reclaim control over Cambodia from Vietnam, Vietnamese offensives on Kampot and Baphnum in retaliation against earlier Cambodian attacks on Hà Tiên, Gia Định and Định Tường provinces; Red depicts area of Siamese control and Siamese army routes. Yellow depicts area of Vietnamese control and Vietnamese army routes. Various colors depict Cambodian regional cliques.

Chaophraya Bodindecha the Siamese supreme commander, taking advantage of the general Cambodian uprising against the Vietnamese Trấn Tây regime, conducted offensives into Cambodia to reassert Siamese control. Chaophraya Bodindecha sent Phraya Ratchanikun to bring 13,000 Lao and Northern Khmer men to assist Oknha Chet and Oknha Decho Ros at Kampong Svay to fight the Vietnamese at Kampong Thom or Hải Đông to the east of Tonle Sap Lake, while Bodindecha himself and his brother-in-law Chaophraya Nakhon Ratchasima Thong-in the governor of Nakhon Ratchasima led 8,735 Lao–Siamese men to attack the Vietnamese-held Pursat or Hải Tây to the southwest of Tonle Sap. In early November 1840, Phraya Ratchanikun marched from the Siam-controlled Siemreap towards Kampong Svay along the northeastern shore of Tonle Sap Lake but the Vietnamese fortresses of Stoung (Sa Tôn) and Chikraeng (Chi Trinh) stood in their way, blocking the Siamese invasion route. Vietnamese commanders at Stoung and Chikraeng were Đoàn Văn Sách and Nguyễn Công Nhàn, respectively. The Siamese had much larger number of fighting forces but they composed mostly of untrained ethnic Lao and Northern Khmer militias, while the Vietnamese had inferior numbers but militarily professionally trained. Even though Đoàn Văn Sách and Nguyễn Công Nhàn managed to repel the Siamese attack on Chikraeng, they decided that Chikraeng was not defensible so they retreated to Stoung, leaving Chikraeng to Siamese occupation.

In early December 1840, Chaophrayas Bodindecha and Nakhon Ratchasima laid siege on Pursat, constructing stockades connected with fences to encircle Pursat in all directions. The Vietnamese commander in Pursat was the Đề Đốc commander Võ Đức Trung sent by Trương Minh Giảng to take control of Pursat after the defection of Oknha Surkealok Muk. The Vietnamese Tuyên phủ governor in Pursat was Nguyễn Song Thành. Võ Đức Trung adopted a defensive strategy, relying on the ramparts of Pursat to persist against the numerically superior Siamese. Bodindecha and Nakhon Ratchasima the Siamese commanders tried to win over Pursat by forcing the Vietnamese to accede to a peace treaty. When Võ Đức Trung and Nguyễn Song Thành refused to negotiate a treaty with the Siamese, saying they were not entitled nor empowered to do so, Bodindecha escalated the siege and attacks on Pursat.

As Phraya Ratchanikun was attacking the Vietnamese-held Stoung, Đoàn Văn Sách injured in battle, Trương Minh Giảng, along with his deputy Lê Văn Đức and Bùi Công Huyên the Tổng đốc Long Tường or governor of Vĩnh Long and Định Tường provinces led Vietnamese forces of 3,100 men from the Trấn Tây citadel at Phnom Penh to help Đoàn Văn Sách and Nguyễn Công Nhàn at Stoung. In late December 1840, Trương Minh Giảng and Nguyễn Công Nhàn repelled the Siamese attack on Stoung. When the Vietnamese forces marched upon the Siamese-occupied Chikraeng, the Lao and Northern Khmer men serving under Siam simply deserted the battlefield, prompting Phraya Ratchanikun to retreat to Phnom Srok, while Oknha Dechou Ros (Bồn Đột) the pro-Siam Khmer governor of Kampong Svay fled to Battambang, all in the Siam-controlled Northwestern Cambodia. The Vietnamese under Trương Minh Giảng then retook control of Chikraeng and the Kampong Svay–Kampong Thom district, expelling the invading Siamese.

Chaophraya Bodindecha, who was besieging Pursat, soon learned that the Siamese under Ratchanikun had suffered defeat on the Kampong Thom front and that the Vietnamese under Trương Minh Giảng were coming for the Pursat front, where Bodindecha was standing. In order to avoid confronting the main Vietnamese troops, Bodindecha had to procure a peace treaty from the Vietnamese in Pursat before arrival of Trương Minh Giảng. Võ Đức Trung, who had been enduring intense Siamese attacks for a month without support from Trương Minh Giảng, decided to capitulate. On 28 December 1840, Võ Đức Trung the commander and Nguyễn Song Thành the governor of Pursat came out to negotiate with Bodindecha. On the fateful day of 30 December 1840, Võ Đức Trung and Nguyễn Song Thành signed a peace treaty with Bodindecha, declaring that the Vietnamese would retreat from Cambodia and resume friendly relation with Siam. Trương Minh Giảng and Lê Văn Đức, crossing the Tonle Sap Lake from Chikraeng, disembarked at Kampong Luong and marched to attack Pursat on the same day. Trương Minh Giảng and Lê Văn Đức were mortified at what Võ Đức Trung and Nguyễn Song Thành the Vietnamese leaders in Pursat had done as the treaty was concluded only a few hours before their arrival. After the conclusion of the Pursat Peace Treaty, Bodindecha sent out Võ Đức Trung, Nguyễn Song Thành and 1,500 Vietnamese people from Pursat, releasing them at Kampong Chhnang without harm. Trương Minh Giảng accused Võ Đức Trung of being a traitor. Võ Đức Trung defended his own decision, saying that further resisting the Siamese attacks on Pursat would only cost lives.

=== Uprising in Eastern Cambodia ===
Sambok, called Sơn Phủ or Sơn Tĩnh, was the Vietnamese administrative headquarter of Eastern Cambodia on the Mekong region, bordering the Siam-controlled Southern Lao Champasak Kingdom. Like in Kampong Thom (Hải Đông) and Pursat (Hải Tây), a Tuyên phủ governor was appointed to Sambok. In September 1840, Oknha Norensena Ten (Na Tiên) arose against Vietnamese rule in Eastern Cambodia, establishing his clique at Chhloung. All the Cambodians on the eastern bank of Mekong; from Srey Santhor, Tbong Khmum, Chhloung, Kanhchor to Kratie, under the Oknha Norensena Ten, arose and fled into the forest, forming resistant guerilla groups, while the western bank of Mekong, including Kampong Siem and Steung Trang, belonged to the clique of Oknha Chet. In October, Norensena Ten raised the Eastern Cambodian forces of 1,000 men under the Eastern Cambodian governors; Oknha Archun Kong the Sdach Tranh governor of Tbong Khmum, Oknha Thommea Thuppedey the governor of Sambour, Oknha Sneha Thireach the governor of Chhloung and Oknha Reacheachou the governor of Steung Trang, to attack the Vietnamese headquarter at Sambok.

In the Vietnamese-held Sambok, there were only 500 men to defend against the Khmers. Even though Oknha Reachea Sneha Prap the Khmer governor of Sambok was firmly loyal to Vietnam, Phùng Nghĩa Phương the Tuyên phủ of Sambok or Sơn Tĩnh, with the Khmer dissidents gathering around, requested troops from Trấn Tây Phnom Penh to guard Sambok. Oknha Yomreach Ruot the Cambodian Minister of Justice had sneaked out of Phnom Penh to join the Eastern Cambodian camp of Norensena Ten. In November 1840, Trương Minh Giảng sent Nguyễn Tiến Phước to bring Vietnamese forces of 1,500 men with 30 warships, according to Thai record, to guard Sambok. Along his riparian route from Phnom Penh to Sambok on the Mekong, going through the area of Oknha Norensena Ten, Nguyễn Tiến Phước faced Cambodian guerilla attacks, during which the Khmers on both river bank sides came out to ambush and quickly retreated to disappear. Nevertheless, Nguyễn Tiến Phước managed to bring the Vietnamese forces to Sambok.

In late December 1840, Oknha Norensena Ten gathered his Eastern Cambodian forces of 700 men at Chhloung and sailed along the Mekong to attack Sambok again. Phùng Nghĩa Phương the Vietnamese governor of Sambok and the commander Nguyễn Tiến Phước defended Sambok and repelled the Cambodians. This news of fresh Cambodian attack reached the Vietnamese commissioners Trương Minh Giảng and Bùi Công Huyên, who had just repelled the Siamese attack on Stoung and Chikraeng. Bùi Công Huyên then volunteered to lead 1,400 Vietnamese men to Eastern Cambodia to relieve the Khmer attack on Sambok.

Upon hearing the news of Cambodian uprising in Sambok, Chaophraya Bodindecha assigned Luang Asanarong a Siamese official in Xieng Taeng (Stung Treng, then part of Champasak Kingdom) to march into Eastern Cambodia to help the Khmers to fight the Vietnamese. On 9 January 1841, Luang Asanarong, along with Phra Si Sulat the Lao governor of Xieng Taeng, led the Southern Lao forces of 900 men from Xieng Taeng (Stung Treng), Saen Pang (Siem Pang) and Khong to sail frrom Xieng Taeng along the Mekong to seize control of Sambour north of Sambok. Next day, on January 10, Luang Asanarong and his Southern Lao forces sailed to attack Sambok, encamping and fortifying at about 800 meters to the north of Sambok. The Vietnamese of Sambok sent out forces to attack Asanarong but failed to dislodge the Siamese. Luang Asanarong summoned the leaders of Eastern Cambodian clique; Oknha Norensena Ten, Oknha Archun Kong of Tbong Khmum and Oknha Yomreach Ruot, to meet him. Asanarong urged these Khmer leaders to gather men to attack the Vietnamese at Sambok but the Khmer leaders were not cooperative, saying that the Eastern Cambodians had fled and scattered into the forests and it was impossible to conscript them.

Previously in 1834, the Trấn Tây administration had established two Muslim Cham regiments, called An Man, led by Cham commanders. The First Cham regiment was led by Po Prahum (Vu Khiêm). The Second Cham regiment was led by Tuan Ly (Tôn Ly). When the Cambodians rebelled against Vietnamese rule in 1840, most of the Chams remained loyal to Vietnam. Bùi Công Huyên and his forces left Phnom Penh on January 10, sailing on the Mekong heading towards Sambok with the Cham regiments under Po Prahum and Tuan Ly as vanguard. Bùi Công Huyên and the Chams reached Hanchey in Kampong Siem, where 1,000 Khmers under Oknha Thommea Thuppedey were guarding. Bùi Công Huyên defeated the Khmers at Kampong Siem and proceeded to Steung Trang. Oknha Norensena Ten sent his subordinate Oknha Archun Kong with 1,000 men to receive Bùi Công Huyên, who stationed at Preaek Kak in Steung Trang, while Archun Kong took position at Kampong Ratt (modern Krouch Chhmar). In mid-January 1841, Bùi Công Huyên sent Lê Khoan Mạnh as vanguard to attack Archun Kong at Kampong Ratt. During the battle, the Vietnamese overwhelmed the Khmers so Archun Kong asked for supporting troops from Oknha Chet's clique. Oknha Chet then sent Khmer forces from Kampong Siem to help Archun Kong, leading to the Khmers eventually prevailing at Kampong Ratt. The Vietnamese suffered casualties and retreated to Steung Trang.

With the Vietnamese defeat at Kampong Ratt, in that night, Tuan Ly mutinied against Bùi Công Huyên and defected to join Oknha Archun Kong at Kampong Ratt. Luang Asanarong the Siamese commander at Sambok, upon learning of Vietnamese approach towards Sambok, sent a peace offer to Bùi Công Huyên at Steung Trang. Bùi Công Huyên accepted the peace offer and retreated to Phnom Penh, not advancing further, drawing criticism from the Vietnamese Emperor Thiệu Trị.

=== Change of Vietnam's policy towards Cambodia ===
After the previous Cambodian uprisings against Vietnamese Trấn Tây regime during 1837–1838, Emperor Minh Mạng and Trương Minh Giảng the Governor-General of Trấn Tây had been taking harder stance towards the Khmers, seeking to integrate Cambodia both politically and culturally into Vietnam, undermining traditional Khmer institutions and identity. The puppet Queen Regnant Ang Mey of Cambodia was demoted and dethroned in mid-1840 altogether, exiled to Saigon in Southern Vietnam. Minh Mạng did not see that his civilizing mission and development policies on Cambodia were received by the Cambodians with contempt and dissatisfactions. Minh Mạng also did not see that it was his sidelining of Cambodian monarchy and his punishments on Cambodian royalty were the cause of the Khmer uprisings in 1840 in the first place.

Phạm Văn Điển, called Ong Ta Tian Kun in Thai sources, whom Minh Mạng had earlier appointed as Kinh lược đại thần Military Strategist to Trấn Tây in November 1840, eventually arrived in Cambodia in early January 1841. Phạm Văn Điển set sail on Mekong riparian path from Tân Châu, An Giang into Cambodian territory of Oknha Chakrey Nong and met with dramatic reception from the Khmers, who appeared on the riverbank from the jungles to 'greet' the new Vietnamese commissioner. The Khmers asked "Is the Queen (Ang Mey) alive?", to which Phạm Văn Điển replied that Ang Mey was alive in Gia Định (Saigon). Phạm Văn Điển then proceeded to Thuyết Nột River (Prek Thnot, south of Phnom Penh), where 500 Khmer men under Oknha Vongsa Anchit Mey of Bati came out to attack Phạm Văn Điển and his Vietnamese retinue. Phạm Văn Điển managed to repel this Khmer ambush and reached Trấn Tây citadel in Phnom Penh. Nguyễn Công Trứ, who accompanied Phạm Văn Điển into Cambodia, reported the Vietnamese Emperor in January 1841 about situation in Cambodia;

These bandits are not united in one place but rather scatter in different places: flat, wild, dense trees, grasses boundless in all four sides. Green bamboos, stagnant water and muddy swamps cannot be travelled through... Now from An Giang to Trấn Tây, passing through Cổ Khê in Phong Nhương district; Sa An on Thuyết Nột River in Nghi Hoà district [These were places in Cambodia], from An Giang to Hà Tiên, passing through Hà Dương and Hà Âm on Vĩnh Tế River, the bandits all set up camps. When our armies transport food and send out dispatch commands, they intercept and fire. On all four sides of Trấn Tây, the bandits usually shout and surround. The army followed and captured them as they ran away and come again everywhere like a swarm of mosquitoes.

Despite superior weaponry and military training, the Vietnamese in Cambodia suffered from lack of local cooperation and guerilla tactics of the Khmers, describing Khmer guerilla attack as "a swarm of mosquitoes". The fact that the Khmers were generally hostile put the Vietnamese in disadvantageous situation. Nguyễn Công Trứ realized that Vietnam would not reclaim control over Cambodia through military forces so he suggested that Minh Mạng should pardon and release the Cambodian Prince Ang Em, who had been imprisoned at Huế since when he defected from Siam to Vietnam in late 1839, to Saigon in order to win the hearts and loyalty of the Khmers so that the upheaval would end. Minh Mạng totally did not agree with this suggestion as his main goal was to integrate Cambodia into Vietnam. Restoring Cambodian dynasty would be opposite of his goal. Minh Mạng replied that the Vietnamese commanders in Trấn Tây had defeated the Khmer rebels every time and the Khmers could only stand because of the Siamese aid. If the Vietnamese expelled the Siamese from Cambodia, the Khmer uprising would end. Minh Mạng also pointed out that the crimes of Ang Em, who had been the Siam-sponsored candidate against Vietnam for two decades, would never be forgiven.

Arrival of Phạm Văn Điển also put Trấn Tây government in political dilemma. According to Thai chronicles, Ong Tian Kun (Trương Minh Giảng) and Ong Ta Tian Kun (Phạm Văn Điển) did not like each other. After forcing a surrender from Vietnamese commanders, Chaophraya Bodindecha the Siamese supreme commander at Pursat sent a diplomatic letter to "Prime Minister of Huế", stating that because the Vietnamese had been oppressing the Khmers the Siamese were obliged to intervene. Bodindecha also demanded the Vietnamese to withdraw all troops from Cambodia and to send diplomatic mission to Bangkok to resume friendly relations. Trương Minh Giảng, guilty of his own inaction towards the events at Pursat, suggested to Minh Mạng that they should observe whether Bodindecha was genuine in his friendly terms. After the Pursat Peace Treaty, according to Thai chronicles, Trương Minh Giảng at Pursat did not return to Trấn Tây citadel but went with his troops to stay at Kampong Thom as Phạm Văn Điển arrived in Phnom Penh and took over the Trấn Tây administration. Trương Minh Giảng was not the only powerful Vietnamese commissioner in Cambodia anymore. Nevertheless, Giảng returned from Kampong Thom to Phnom Penh on February 5. Also in January 1841, Lê Quang Huyên the governor of Hà Tiên reported that the Khmers had petitioned a letter to him, conveying their grudges and grievances on Trương Minh Giảng, accusing the Vietnamese commissioner of abusing Khmer people. The report came as a subtle shock to Minh Mạng, who had been trusting Trương Minh Giảng to implement his own civilizing mission and development projects on Cambodia, which were supposed to produce positive result and responses. Minh Mạng might reconsider his policies towards Cambodia but before he could do anything he died on 20 January 1841, after an accident of falling from horseback. Before his death, Minh Mạng told Trương Minh Giảng and Phạm Văn Điển to form a united front against the Siamese. Minh Mạng's eldest son Prince Nguyễn Phúc Miên Tông ascended the Nguyen imperial throne as the new Emperor Thiệu Trị.

Bodindecha's letter to "Prime Minister of Huế" ended up in the hand of Phạm Văn Điển, who wrote a fiery reply letter to the Siamese commander on 11 February 1841. Trương Minh Giảng and Phạm Văn Điển jointly wrote the reply letter but in the Thai chronicles it was Ong Ta Tian Kun (Phạm Văn Điển) alone who wrote the letter, calling the Siamese hypocritical. The Vietnamese letter said that the Siamese had invaded Cambodia and Vietnam several times, even though Vietnam had not once encroached on Siamese territories. If Bodindecha wanted to negotiate with Vietnam, he and the Siamese should retreat from Pursat back to Battambang first. If the Siamese wanted to resume diplomatic relations with Vietnam, they should send a mission to Huế first. These exchanges between Siam and Vietnam were not diplomatic but rather provocative. Nevertheless, the Siamese and the Vietnamese reached a stalemate in Cambodia and their conflict shifted from military to diplomatic and political front for a time being.

=== Siamese endorsement of Ang Duong ===
By 1840, all the Cambodian royalty were either imprisoned, detained or grounded. After his abortive plot to stage a coup in Battambang in late 1838, Ang Duong was imprisoned in Bangkok but a Siamese official Phraya Si Sahathep beseeched the Siamese King Rama III or King Nangklao that Ang Duong was the only remaining male candidate to the Cambodian throne on the Siamese side so Ang Duong should be gently treated with hospitality. King Nangklao then allowed Si Sahathep to take Ang Duong to his house. Ang Duong had been living in virtual house arrest at the house of Si Sahathep. Meawhile, Ang Duong's elder brother Ang Em, who had earlier defected from Siam to Vietnam in late 1839, ended up being imprisoned in Huế by the orders of Minh Mạng, who refused to acknowledge Ang Em. Remaining three Khmer princesses; Ang Mey, Ang Peou and Ang Sngoun were in exile in Saigon in Southern Vietnam.

When Oknha Surkealok Muk the governor of Pursat and Oknha Vibolreach Long presented eighteen Oknha letters to Chaophraya Bodindecha at Pursat, requesting for Siam to release Prince Ang Duong to be their leader, Bodindecha sent Oknha Vibolreach Long to bring those Oknha letters to Bangkok to present to the Siamese king. After examining the Khmer Oknha letters, supposedly through translation, King Nangklao consented to official endorsement of the 45-year-old Prince Ang Duong as the Siam-sponsored candidate to the Cambodian throne.

After the conclusion of the Pursat Peace Treaty on 30 December 1840 and the expulsion of the Vietnamese from Pursat a day after on December 31, Bodindecha and the Siamese stayed at Pursat for two weeks until their food supply became depleted. On 14 January 1841, Chaophraya Bodindecha, Chaophraya Nakhon Ratchasima Thong-in and the Siamese retreated from Pursat back to Battambang. Bodindecha also assigned Oknha Surkealok Muk to guard Pursat with 1,100 Khmer men.

The Siamese King Nangklao gave Ang Duong a long lecture about upholding the Sammādiṭṭhi ("Right View") or orthodox Theravada Buddhist religion against the Vietnamese Micchādiṭṭhi ("Wrong View", meaning other religion than Theravada Buddhism). Nangklao lamented that the Buddhist religion in Cambodia had been destroyed by the Vietnamese, who dismantled Buddhist temples for bricks and disrobed Buddhist monks for labors. Nangklao also pointed out that the defected Prince Ang Em was greedy, betraying the Siamese at Battambang hoping to become the King of Cambodia but ended up imprisoned by the Vietnamese. The Siamese king put the blame of this state of Cambodia on the deceased pro-Vietnamese Cambodian King Ang Chan;

His Royal Holy Buddha Majesty (King Nangklao) is sorrowful in his heart, lamenting on the Holy Buddha Religion, sympathizing on the Khmer Oknhas and the Khmer people to a great extent, saying that things have become this way because of Ong Chan (Ang Chan). The Holy Religion in the Khmer kingdom will decline and be lost. It is his royal determination to uphold and maintain the Holy Buddha Religion in the Khmer kingdom, so that the Vietnamese of the Micchādiṭṭhi will not destroy it, so that the Vietnamese will not transform the Khmers from Sammādiṭṭhi to Micchādiṭṭhi, or else all the Khmers will fall into the Apaya (lower realm, meaning Buddhist hell). His Majesty is determined that the Khmers will retain their Jāti (ethnic identity) and Sakula (ancestral identity).

King Nangklao told Ang Duong not to be biased by love (Chandāgati), anger (Dosāgati), delusion (Mohāgati) and fear (Bhayāgati) in his reigning in Cambodia. The Siamese king told Ang Duong to obey the Siamese commander Chaophraya Bodindecha and to respect the high-ranking Khmer Oknhas. Nangklao also stressed the importance of appointing respectable Buddhist monks to ranks and honors in Cambodian Sangha order. Nangklao told Ang Duong and Bodindecha to gather Khmer monks, who had taken refuge from Vietnamese rule in the Siam-controlled Northwestern Cambodia, to appoint them in Ang Duong's ecclesiastic hierarchy. Lastly, Nangklao gave Ang Duong a crystal Buddha statue adorned with gold and fine saffron robes for Ang Duong to appoint the venerable monks to religious positions.

On 1 February 1841, Phraya Siharaj Decho the Siamese official brought Ang Duong and the Siamese king's order to leave Bangkok for Battambang. Ang Duong and the royal order reached Battambang on February 3. Chaophraya Bodindecha received the royal order of the Siamese king commanding him to promote Ang Duong as the Siamese candidate for the Cambodian throne. Bodindecha then had Ang Duong write letters to all of the Khmer Oknhas informing them that, under the auspices of the Siamese king, Ang Duong had arrived in Cambodia to be their monarch and that the Oknhas should come to partake in a sacred-water-drinking ritual to swear fealty to Ang Duong in Battambang. Bodindecha wrote a reply letter to the Siamese king in Bangkok, saying he would do everything he could to bring Cambodia under Siamese control. Bodindecha stated he would instigate the rebelling Khmer Oknhas to arise against the Vietnamese so that "Cambodia and Vietnam would never become allies again". Bodindecha went to the point that he said "If I cannot conquer the Khmer territory, I will not let Cambodia be with Vietnam again either".

== Third Phase: February–November 1841 ==
Third phase of Cambodian uprising against Vietnam began when the Siamese king Rama III endorsed the pro-Thai Khmer prince Ang Duong to be the Siam-sponsored candidated for the Cambodian throne. This move was to attract Khmer popular sentiments towards the Siamese side, taking the opportunity of the general Cambodian uprising against Vietnam. Chaophraya Bodindecha the Siamese supreme commander in Cambodia brought Ang Duong to Battambang in February 1841. Bodindecha presented Ang Duong as the leader of the anti-Vietnamese movement of the Cambodian Oknha nobility who had been insurrecting and waging wars with the Vietnamese Trấn Tây government at Phnom Penh since September 1840. The Siamese initially planned to place Ang Duong in Pursat. Bodindecha also sent his agents the Cambodian officials working under Siam to support and inspect the Oknhas who had been besieging the Trấn Tây citadel at Phnom Penh. Most of the Oknhas submitted to Ang Duong and to Siam but the self-proclaimed Oknha Chakrey Nong maintained his independent clique at Ba Phnum in Southeastern Cambodia.

Nguyễn Công Trứ was appointed as the new Tham tán Đại thần or counselor of Trấn Tây in March 1841. Nguyễn Công Trứ had been advocating for Vietnamese peaceful reclamation of Cambodia through employing the Cambodian royalty to persuade the Khmer people to resume their loyalty to Vietnam, instead of through military forces alone. Nguyễn Công Trứ convinced Trương Minh Giảng the Vietnamese Governor-General of Trấn Tây Cambodia to petition to the Vietnamese Emperor Thiệu Trị to release the Cambodian royalty back to Cambodia. Thiệu Trị allowed the Khmer princesses Ang Mey, Ang Peou and Ang Sngoun, who had been grounded in Saigon in Southern Vietnam, to return to Cambodia to incite the Khmers to turn their allegiance to Vietnam. Bodindecha was greatly alarmed by the presence of a rival claimant in Phnom Penh so he brought Ang Duong to Oudong the former Cambodian royal capital in May 1841 in order for Ang Duong to reach for Khmer people more. Cambodia was then divided into three factions including the Siamese-backed faction of Ang Duong, who controlled most of Western Cambodia, the Vietnamese faction, who only controlled the Phnom Penh vicinity and the independent clique of Oknha Chakrey Nong at Ba Phnum.

It turned out that Princess Ang Mey did not manage to attract popular Khmer support to Vietnam due to the Khmers being largely weary of six-year period of Vietnamese rule. Nguyễn Công Trứ again petitioned to Thiệu Trị to release the Cambodian prince Ang Em, who used to be a pro-Siamese candidated but ended up imprisoned at Huế when he defected to Vietnamese side in 1839. Thiệu Trị released Ang Em to return to Cambodia in one last attempt to rally popular support for the falling Trấn Tây regime. Ang Em arrived in Cambodia in October 1841 but, like Ang Mey, also failed to attract popularity. With the deteriorating Vietnamese conditions in the Trấn Tây citadel, the Vietnamese suffered from food shortage, disease and the enemies surrounding on all sides. Eventually the Vietnamese decided to withdraw from Cambodia to Châu Đốc in Southern Vietnam altogether during late October to early November 1841. Trương Minh Giảng, who had been the Tướng quân or Governor-General of Trấn Tây since 1835, unable to cope with the loss of Cambodia, committed suicide by drinking poison. Vietnamese withdrawal from Cambodia was a victory for the Cambodian Oknha nobility who accomplished their goal of ending Vietnamese rule in Cambodia and also a victory for Siam who would soon establish control over Cambodia.

=== Siamese advance into Cambodia ===
After the Peace Treaty of Pursat in late December 1840, forced by Chaophraya Bodindecha on the Vietnamese officials at Pursat, the Siamese seized control of Pursat. Bodindecha and the Siamese retreated from Pursat to Battambang in mid-January 1841 but Bodindecha also left the pro-Thai Oknha Surkealok Muk the Sdach Tranh governor of Pursat to guard Pursat for him. On the Kampong Thom front, Trương Minh Giảng prevailed over the Siamese, repelling the Siamese commander Phraya Ratchanikun who retreated to Phnom Srok. Vietnamese assault on the area caused the Khmer people in Kampong Svay area to scatter and flee into the forests in panic, with Oknha Dechou Ros the Sdach Tranh governor of Kampong Svay himself fleeing to take refuge in Battambang in Siam-controlled Northwestern Cambodia.

However, Trương Minh Giảng proposed to Thiệu Trị that Vietnamese position in Kampong Svay-Kampong Thom or Hải Đông area was untenable due to communication difficulties with the Trấn Tây citadel of Phnom Penh so Giảng planned for evacuation of the Vietnamese from the area. Emperor Thiệu Trị consented to the plan so the Vietnamese commanders Đoàn Văn Sách, Nguyễn Công Nhàn and the Vietnamese forces moved from Kampong Thom to Kampong Chhnang, leaving the Kampong Thom area to the Siamese, who were quick to take their position. Chaophraya Bodindecha appointed Snang Ey, the Khmer leader who had earlier insurrected against the Vietnamese in Kampong Svay in 1838, as "Oknha Dechou Phakkedey" the new governor of Kampong Svay under Siamese command. Oknha Dechou Snang Ey was tasked with rehabilitating the Kampong Svay district, gathering the panicked Khmer people and raised forces against the Vietnamese.

Among many orders, the Siamese king Rama III commanded Bodindecha to lead Ang Duong to take position in Pursat to rally Khmer popular support. Meanwhile, in the vicinity of Phnom Penh, the Southern Cambodian, anti-Vietnamese Oknhas had been enclosing on the Vietnamese Trấn Tây citadel since November 1840 without any fruitful results. The main Oknha leaders were Oknha Outey Thireach Hing (Tùng Hiên) of Samraong Tong with his 1,000 Khmer men taking position at Stueng Meanchey to the southwest of Phnom Penh and Oknha Vongsa Anchit Mey (Đào Vân) of Bati with 1,000 men stationing at Prek Thnot (modern Ta Khmau) to the south of Phnom Penh. Bodindecha sent Oknha Surkealok Kas the former Pursat governor and Phra Narinyotha Nong the vice-governor of Battambang (both were Cambodian officials serving under Siam) to oversee the Southern Oknhas. Bodindecha also sent Phraya Senaphubet as the Siamese delegate to the front.

Phraya Senaphubet the Siamese delegate from Battambang reached Bati on 16 February 1841, where he met with the Cambodian clique leaders including Oknha Outey Thireach Hing of Samraong Tong, Oknha Akkareach Prom, Oknha Vongsa Anchit Mey of Bati, Oknha Chet of Baray and Oknha Pisnulok Preak of Treang. The Oknhas told Phraya Senaphubet that Ang Duong should stay in Pursat because the royal capital of Phnom Penh was still under Vietnamese control. Senaphubet asked whether the Oknhas could rely on themselves in expelling the Vietnamese from Cambodia. The Oknhas replied that they could not as they found difficulties in manpower as Khmer fighting men had largely scattered into the forests, conscripting them would be a hard task and difficulties due to shortage of weapons and gunpowder. Phraya Senaphubet then observed the military of these Oknhas. Senaphubet found that the Oknhas were lax in manpower control, the levies undisciplined and allowed to go home, though it might be argued that the Khmer leaders could not impose stringent control on their subjects or they would face desertions and, due to food shortage in Cambodia, they had to let their troops go home to find food.

Trương Minh Giảng the Governor-General of Trấn Tây Cambodia and his deputy Lê Văn Đức went to visit the new Vietnamese Emperor Thiệu Trị at Huế and then returned to Cambodia. Upon his return, on February 23, Trương Minh Giảng from Phnom Penh attacked the camp of Oknha Vongsa Anchit Mey at Prek Thnot, defeating and dislodging the Khmers. Phraya Senaphubet the Siamese delegate had to return to Pursat due to the Vietnamese attack. Senaphubet assigned Phra Narinyotha Nong of Battambang to station at Samraong Tong to help the Khmers against the Vietnamese. When Chaophraya Bodindecha learned that the Khmer Oknhas were falling down in their stand against the Vietnamese, he had Ang Duong write letters to the Oknhas, reminding the Oknhas that they had become too inefficient and urged them to fight the Vietnamese more energetically but at this point the Oknhas had become exhausted and desperate. The Vietnamese later attacked and dislodged the Khmer clique of Oknha Outey Thireach Hing at Stueng Meanchey.

Chaophraya Bodindecha brought Ang Duong from Battambang on 6 March 1841 to stay at Pursat. At this point, Bodindecha seemed to adopt the strategy of taking highland positions against the Vietnamese who came by the waterways. Bodindecha initiated the construction of a new fortress as the citadel for Ang Duong on a high ground near Pursat. As Ang Duong came to stay in Pursat, making his presence known to the Khmers, most of the Khmer Oknhas and cliques had submitted to Ang Duong. The Southeastern clique of Oknha Chakrey Nong, who seemed to be more loyal to Ang Mey, centered on Ba Phnum, did not submit to Ang Duong or to the Siamese.

=== Khmer Krom uprising in Ba Xuyên ===
Earlier in October 1840, two Khmer Krom leaders Oknha Reachea Setthey (Kỳ La) the governor of Moat Chruk (Tịnh Biên) and Oknha Athikvongsa Tot (Việt Tốt) the governor of Bassac (Ba Xuyên, modern Sóc Trăng) arose against the Vietnamese in Tịnh Biên in October 1840. Dương Văn Phong the governor of An Giang (Châu Đốc) and Hà Tiên provinces subjugated the Khmer Krom rebels and took position at Tịnh Biên. Later then, in December 1840, another two Khmer Krom leaders Oknha Thiet (Chân Triết) and Oknha Vongsa Sankream Meas (Hàn Biện) rallied at Tri Tôn in the Thất Sơn or Bảy Núi Mountains and attacked the Vietnamese at Rạch Giá in Kiên Giang. Lê Quang Huyên the governor of Hà Tiên repelled the Khmer Kroms from Kiên Giang. Dương Văn Phong and Lê Quang Huyên then joined forces from Tịnh Biên and Hà Tiên, respectively, to successfully crush the Khmer Kroms at Thất Sơn Mountains. After their defeats, the Khmer Krom leaders Oknha Athikvongsa Tot and Oknha Vongsa Sangkream Meas fled downstream the Bassac River to regroup and initiate another Khmer Krom uprising in Bassac or Ba Xuyên against Vietnam.

In February 1841, Oknha Athikvongsa Tot the governor of Bassac (previously known as Việt Tốt, then known as Sơn Tốt) led the Khmer Kroms to arise against the Vietnamese, joined by the Chinese immigrants led by a Chinese merchant named Trần Lâm (Chen Lin). Oknha Tot and Chen Lin led 5,000 to 6,000 Khmer Krom and Chinese men to attack the Vietnamese headquarter at Ba Xuyên (modern Sóc Trăng) in An Giang province on 5 February 1841. Dương Văn Phong the governor of An Giang, who had been staying in Tịnh Biên, quickly marched forces downstream the Bassac River to relieve Ba Xuyên of Khmer Krom attack. Oknha Tot was killed in battle while Chen Lin retreated to take position at Bãi Xàu (Mỹ Xuyên) to the south of Sóc Trăng. Dương Văn Phong then followed to destroy the rebel base at Bãi Xàu, prompting Chen Lin to flee further.

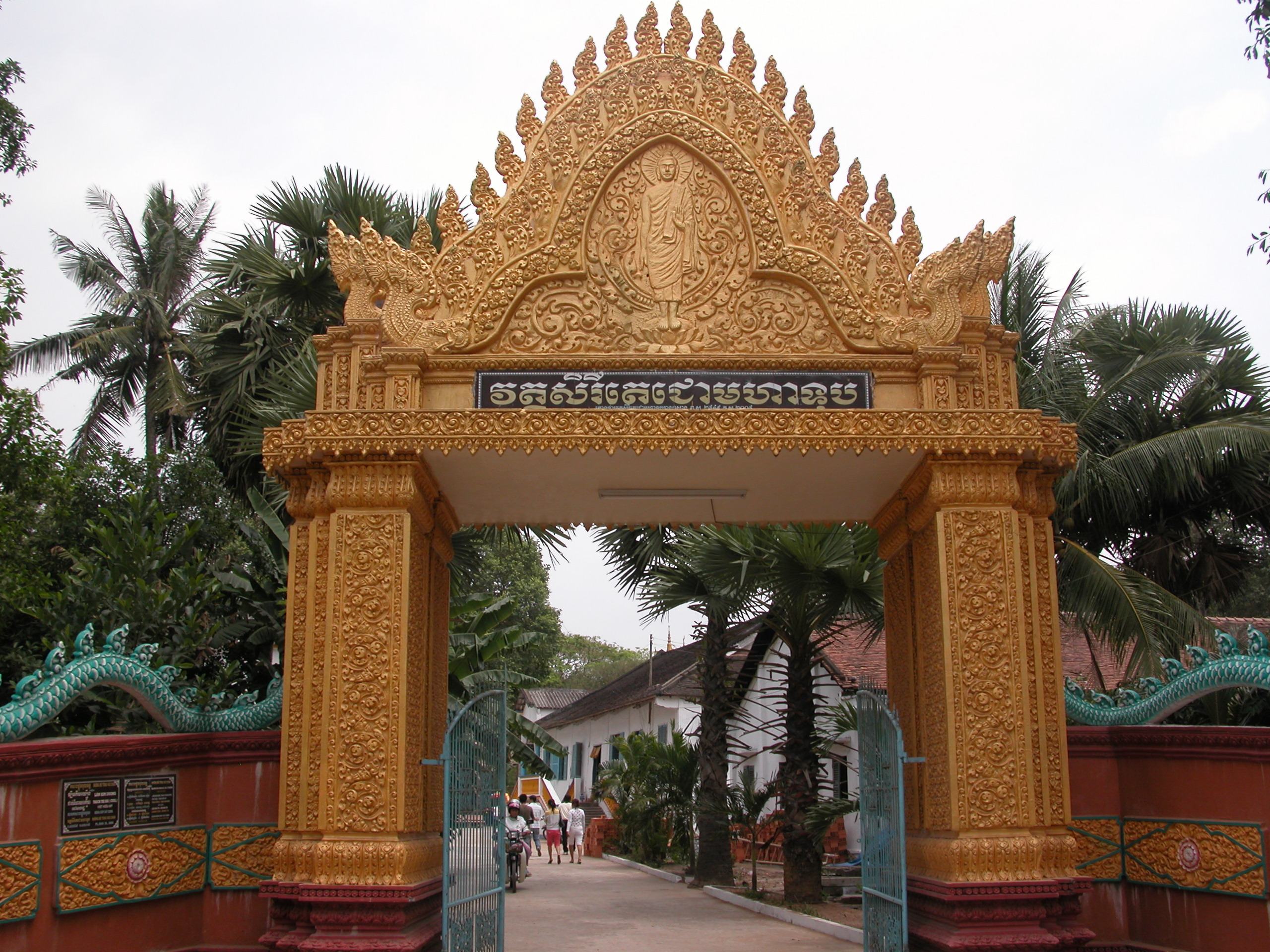
Vatt Siri Techo Maha Thup temple, a Theravadin Khmer Krom temple in modern Sóc Trăng, known by Vietnamese name Mã Tộc, was the site of a battle between the Khmer Kroms and the Vietnamese in early 1841.

With the setbacks of Khmer Krom uprising in Bassac or Ba Xuyên downstream from Cambodia at the mouth of Bassac River, the Khmer Oknhas intervened to uphold the Khmer Krom movement. The Oknhas sent Oknha Sena Reachea Sangkream the governor of Baribour from Southern Cambodia to help Chen Lin at Bassac. Support from the Oknhas emboldened the Khmer Kroms in Bassac, who had taken positions in Mã Tộc, Sóc Trăng and Trà Tâm. Dương Văn Phong then gathered 1,200 Vietnamese men to suppress the rebels on 27 February 1841 but he fell ill due to an infection in his leg so he assigned his relative to lead the Vietnamese into battle. At Mã Tộc, the Vietnamese were ambushed and massacred by the Khmers under Oknha Vongsa Sangkream Meas, suffering casualties. Upon this devastating Vietnamese defeat, Trương Minh Giảng sent Mai Văn Đổng from Phnom Penh to bring 1,000 men down to Bassac to successfully defeat the Khmer Kroms at Mã Tộc.

Dương Văn Phong, still not well, sent Mai Văn Đổng out to attack the Khmer Kroms at Mã Tộc again on 21 March 1841 but the Vietnamese were ambushed by the Khmers under Oknha Sena Reachea Sangkream and Mai Văn Đổng was killed in battle. The Vietnamese Emperor Thiệu Trị was incensed at these humiliating defeats in Ba Xuyên so he dismissed Dương Văn Phong from his governorship of An Giang and Hà Tiên provinces (Tổng đốc An Hà), sent Bùi Công Huyên from Phnom Penh and Nguyễn Văn Chương (later changed his name to Nguyễn Tri Phương) from Da Nang to suppress the Khmer Kroms at Ba Xuyên. Dương Văn Phong died from illness shortly after.

=== Cult of Achar Tieng ===
By March 1841, the Siamese had controlled Western and Northern parts of Cambodia from Battambang and Siemreap to Pursat and Kampong Svay. The Southern Oknhas leaders in Samraong Tong, Bati and Treang had all pledged alliance to Ang Duong the pro-Thai candidate for Cambodian kingship and to Chaophraya Bodindecha the Siamese supreme commander. However, the Vietnamese, under Trương Minh Giảng the Governor-General of Trấn Tây, with 20,000 men in the Trấn Tây citadel, still controlled the Phnom Penh vicinity and the self-proclaimed Oknha Chakrey Nong still maintained his independent clique in Southeastern Cambodia, centered on Ba Phnum. On 21 March 1841, Tuan Ly the former Cham commander serving under Vietnam, who had earlier defected to the Siamese side, attacked the Vietnamese at Rokakaong to 'rescue' his fellow Cham people from Vietnamese rule. Bodindecha commanded Oknha Dechou Ros and Oknha Dechou Snang Ey the two governors of Kampong Svay to restore order in the area and to gather the scattering Khmer people into their town.

The Vietnamese built a new fortress at Chroy Changvar, opposite of Phnom Penh to the northeast on the river, where Muslim Cham men were deployed to guard. This new Chroy Changvar fortress was problematic for the Siamese, who sought to take control of the remaining Southeastern Cambodia. Bodindecha planned to send Preah Angkev Ma (uncle of Princess Ang Pen) to lead forces to take control over the clique of Oknha Chakrey Nong at Ba Phnum to the southeast. However, this Chroy Changvar fortress obstructed the way and the fortress also posed threats to Kampong Siem, Cheung Prey and Baray, the area of Siam-aligned Oknha Chet clique. Bodindecha also did not plan to directly attack Chroy Changvar as the overwhelming Vietnamese forces from Phnom Penh would come to defend it.

When the Siamese were contemplating taking control over Cambodia, an unexpected event happened. In March 1841, a Khmer Buddhist monk in his thirties named Achar Tieng or Echar Tieng, who had earlier studied Buddhism in Bangkok, declared himself an independent Neak Sel or holy man in Srey Santhor. Achar Tieng posed himself as a magic sorcerer, attracting 8,000 followers in the area, becoming a rising political force in Cambodia. Every morning, Achar Tieng would practice archery shooting towards the sun. His goal was to shoot down the sun. Once a week, his followers would gather around Achar Tieng, drinking the enchanted coconut water, which they believed could cure diseases. Achar Tieng did not pledge alliance to Siam nor Vietnam, remaining independent. Emergence of Achar Tieng posed a problem to the Siamese, who sought to take control over whole Cambodia.

One Khmer Oknha, Oknha Thireach Sator Sau the governor of Anlong Reach, became a follower of Achar Tieng and second leader of the cult. Tieng ordered Oknha Thireach Sator to bring the enchanted spear along with the followers to perform sacrificial rituals and struck the spear at Sandaek (Batheay district), commanding that the followers should let no one to take out the spear. Oknha Thireach Sator and the followers then built houses to surround the spear, stored with weapons, ammunitions and the enchanted water. As the cult of Achar Tieng escalated, Oknha Dechou Ros the Sdach Tranh governor of Kampong Svay commanded Oknha Sen Sangkream the governor of Srey Santhor to investigate. Oknha Sen Sangkream sent his delegate to visit the camp of Achar Tieng, declaring that the Kampong Svay governor had commanded Achar Tieng to submit to Ang Duong and his followers to be conscripted to fight the Vietnamese. Achar Tieng and his followers apparently refused. Followers of the cult then plundered Srey Santhor, taking some weapons and injuring Oknha Sen Sangkream. Also, Oknha Chet commanded Oknha Thireach Sator to report but Thireach Sator refused, saying he was busy worshipping the holy spear.

Chaophraya Bodindecha realized the cult of Achar Tieng was growing, becoming a new threat but Bodindecha did not plan to directly suppress the cult because Achar Tieng was popular, attracting many Khmer followers and harming Achar Tieng would alienate the Khmers from the Siamese. Bodindecha then sent Preah Angkev Ma and Oknha Dechou Ros to arrest Oknha Thireach Sator and to subdue Achar Tieng through persuasion in late March 1841. Details did not survive about how Achar Tieng was brought down but Tieng was eventually arrested and sent to Bangkok.

=== Establishment of rival Cambodian courts ===
Lê Văn Đức the Tham tán Đại thần or deputy governor of Trấn Tây became ill and resigned from his position. Emperor Thiệu Trị then made Nguyễn Công Trứ the new Tham tán Đại thần or deputy governor-general of Cambodia. Given the situation of the Vietnamese, losing control over most parts of Cambodia, in March 1841, Nguyễn Công Trứ, who had been an advocate of reclaiming Cambodia through peaceful means, winning hearts rather than through warfare, convinced Trương Minh Giảng to petition that the Emperor should allowed the three remaining Khmer princesses Ang Mey, Ang Peou and Ang Sngoun to return from Saigon to Phnom Penh in order to restore popular Khmer support to the Vietnamese. Trương Minh Giảng also proposed the release of the former pro-Siamese Khmer prince Ang Em, who had been imprisoned in Huế and other high-ranking Khmer mandarins, who had earlier been exiled to Vietnam, to return to Cambodia;

Last year, Ngọc Biện (Ang Pen) planned to escape so Ngọc Vân (Ang Mey) had to be moved to Gia Định (Saigon). Then the local Khmer chiefs, not satisfied with their ambitions, captured and killed [Vietnamese] officials and incited the Khmer people to join in causing troubles. The Siamese took advantage of the situation to incite them to join in under the pretext of bringing back Giun (Ang Duong) to rule but secretly intended to compete with us for the land of Cambodia. Those people were so ignorant that they considered us as their enemies and the Siamese as benefactors so ten prefectures and twenty three districts all betrayed us and followed Siam, even the Khmers of the six provinces of Nam Kỳ (Cochinchina) all wanted to follow Siam. The land and people of Cambodia today, although not all of it is owned by Siam, it is no longer like the past. If we send a large army to hunt down in all the forests and mountains, not only it will be useless, but it will also push away the Khmers to Siamese side and what we gain will be only empty lands. Recently, I have words translated into Khmer language and posted them on forest paths, to let them know the way back to us but they hold back their hearts and absolutely do not dare to return, then even if we want to take their land as districts and their people as soldiers and civilians, there is no reason anymore. Before, the Khmer people who passed by often asked where Ngọc Vân (Ang Mey) is and how Yểm (Ang Em) is now. They wanted to see their faces. Moreover, it is the Khmer custom that, whether in life of death, they should obey the orders of their royalty, especially Ngọc Vân (Ang Mey), who is their queen. Please issue an edict to Gia Định province to send Ngọc Vân (Ang Mey) Ngọc Thu (Ang Peou) and Ngọc Nguyên (Ang Sngoun) all back to Trấn Tây. As for Yểm (Ang Em), Giao, Trà Long (Chauvea Tolaha Long), Nhâm Vu (Samdech Chauponhea Hu), La Kiên (Oknha Kralahom Kinh), Ốc Tâm (Oknha Veang Tom), all of them should be pardoned. Send troops to escort them back to their former places and command them to gather Khmer leaders and people.

The Vietnamese Emperor Thiệu Trị allowed the three Khmer princesses Ang Mey, Ang Peou and Ang Sngoun, along with Oknha Veang Tom, who had earlier been exiled to Vĩnh Long, to return to Cambodia. However, the Emperor did not pardon Ang Em, who had been imprisoned in Huế and the senior Khmer ministers Chauvea Tolaha Long, Samdech Chauponhea Hu and Oknha Kralahom Kinh, who had been exiled to Northern Vietnam, saying that their crimes were still unforgivable. The Vietnamese then commanded Oknha Veang Tom to lead a riparian procession, comprising twenty vessels, to bring the princesses Ang Mey, Ang Peou, Ang Sngoun and Neak Neang Ros, the mother of both Ang Em and Ang Duong, from Saigon to return to Phnom Penh, reaching Phnom Penh on 27 April 1841. Trương Minh Giảng dismantled the house of Chauvea Tolaha Long and built a new place for the Khmer royal ladies to stay in Phnom Penh. Giảng then had words translated into Khmer language and posted at many places, announcing that the Khmer royalty had been restored, urging the Khmers to shift their loyalty to Vietnam.

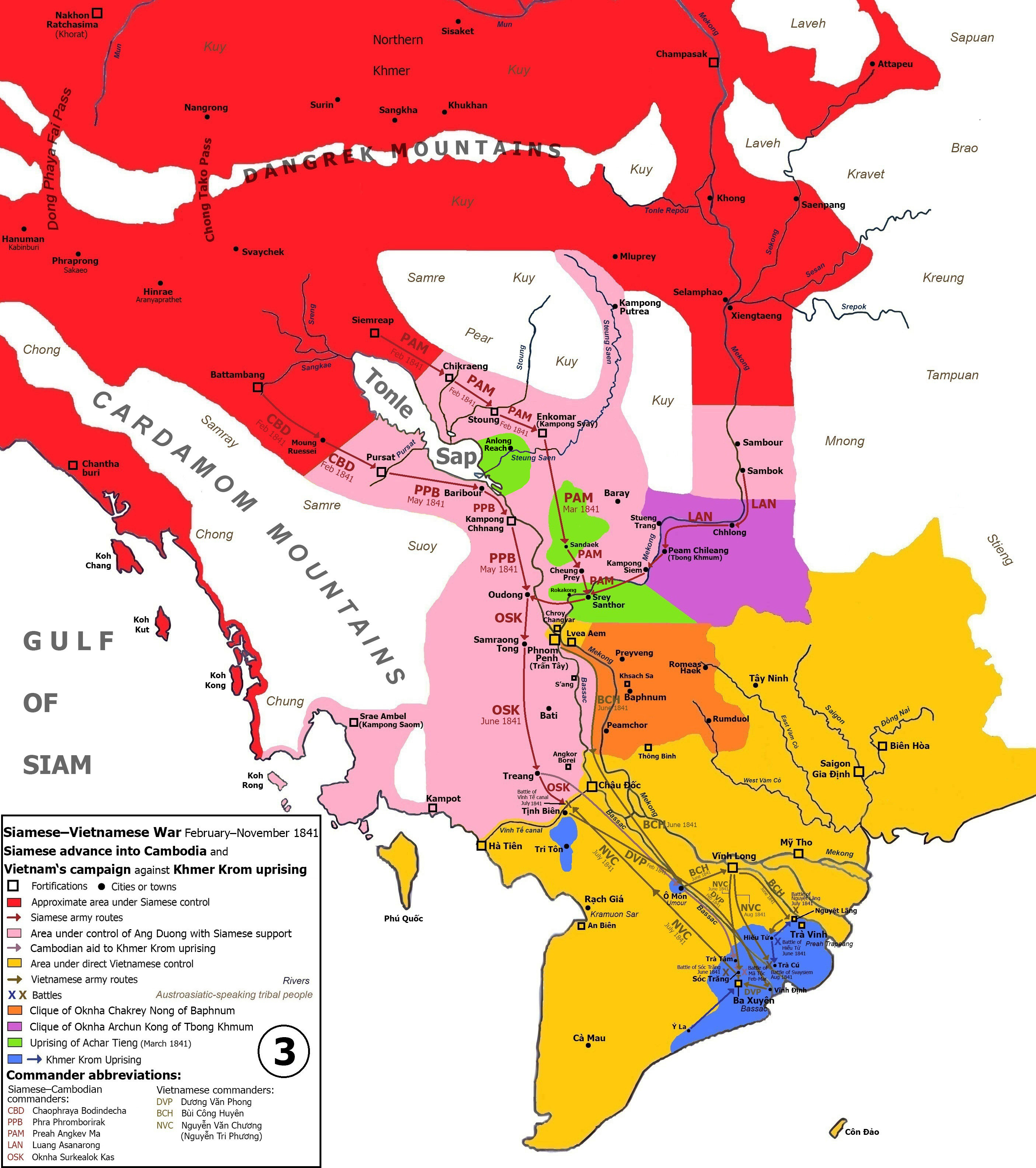
Siamese–Vietnamese War: February–November 1841 Siamese advance into Cambodia: By mid-1841, Chaophraya Bodindecha and Ang Duong had taken control of Western Cambodia, while the Vietnamese were reduced and restricted to the Phnom Penh vicinity. Ba Phnum and Tbong Khmum cliques had not yet submitted to Ang Duong. Area of direct Siamese control Area controlled by Ang Duong under Siamese support Uprising of Achar Tieng Vietnamese suppression of Khmer Krom Uprising: In 1841, the Khmer Kroms of Mekong Delta had been rebelling against Vietnam at Ba Xuyên and Lạc Hóa. The Cambodians also sent aid to their fellow Khmer Kroms in the uprising. Area of direct Vietnamese control Khmer Krom Uprising

As this Cambodian uprising rooted in the Vietnamese taking away the Khmer royalty, decision of Emperor Thiệu Trị to restore Cambodian monarchy addressed the cause of the uprising. Chaophraya Bodindecha was greatly alarmed by the return of the Khmer princesses to Phnom Penh as he had been expecting the Khmers to pledge loyalty to Ang Duong alone. Presence of Ang Mey in Phnom Penh would compete with Bodindecha's effort to promote Ang Duong as the King of Cambodia. Bodindecha considered Ang Duong, who had been staying in Pursat, to be too far from Phnom Penh to attract popular Khmer support so Bodindecha decided to abandon his plan to construct a fortress for Ang Duong in Pursat and took Ang Duong to Oudong. On 29 April 1841, Bodindecha commanded his son Phra Phromborirak to lead the forces of 5,000 Khmer men to parade Ang Duong from Pursat to Oudong. Phra Phromborirak and Ang Duong reached Oudong on May 6, staying at Khleang Sbek, the former headquarter of Chaophraya Aphaiphubet Baen, who was the Siam-appointed Regent of Cambodia in Oudong during 1790–1795. Oudong had been the royal capital of Cambodia for two centuries since 1601 but was burnt down by the invading Siamese in 1813 as King Ang Chan moved the royal seat to Phnom Penh.

The Siamese and the Vietnamese established two rival Cambodian courts with their candidates under their influences; Ang Duong the pro-Siamese candidate in Oudong and Ang Mey the pro-Vietnamese candidate in Phnom Penh. The two courts in Oudong and Phnom Penh were only about thirty kilometers apart from each other. Both sides then engaged in propaganda warfare, rallying and persuading the Khmers to pledge loyalty of their candidates. Ang Duong, supported by Chaophraya Bodindecha and the Siamese, controlled Western half of Cambodia from Pursat, Kampong Svay down to Kampot and Kampong Saom on the coast. Ang Mey, supported by Trương Minh Giảng and Vietnam, controlled only the Phnom Penh vicinity, while Southeastern Cambodia remained under the independent clique of Oknha Chakrey Nong. Thiệu Trị, in contrast to the confrontational attitude of his father and predecessor Minh Mạng on Cambodia, had a more practical, reconciliatory approach. Thiệu Trị granted general pardon to the Khmers who had been insurrecting and urged them to resume their loyalty to Vietnam. In spite of his good intention, however, after six years of Vietnamese rule, the Khmers were weary of Vietnamese presence and mostly saw Ang Duong as their savior.

Despite being on opposite political sides, the Khmer royalty were relatives. Ang Mey, Neak Neang Ros and the other princesses sent a secret letter from Phnom Penh to Ang Duong at Oudong, urging Ang Duong to send a force to fetch them from Phnom Penh.Oknha Veang Tom the pro-Vietnamese chief minister of Ang Mey discovered this and made sure that Ang Mey and the royal ladies would not escape.

=== Khmer Krom uprising in Lạc Hóa ===
When Dương Văn Phong the Tổng đốc An Hà or governor of An Giang and Hà Tiên provinces failed to suppress the Khmer Krom uprising in Ba Xuyên (Sóc Trăng) in An Giang province in March 1841, he was dismissed from his governorate position and soon died of illness. Emperor Thiệu Trị then made Bùi Công Huyên from Phnom Penh, who was already the Tổng đốc Long Tường or governor of Vĩnh Long and Định Tường provinces, to be the new Tổng đốc An Hà or governor of An Giang and Hà Tiên provinces. Bùi Công Huyên then governed four out of six provinces of Cochinchina, while Nguyễn Văn Chương (Nguyên Tri Phương) was made the Tuần phủ sub-governor of An Giang province.

Before the Vietnamese could do anything, there was another major Khmer Krom rebellion in Lạc Hóa or modern Trà Vinh, called Preah Trapeang (Khmer: ព្រះត្រពាំង), which was the place known to be long inhabited by the Khmers but was incorporated into Vietnam around late eighteenth century during the process of Nam tiến or Southward Expansion, eventually becoming a part of Vĩnh Long province but the administration of Lạc Hóa was filled by native Khmer staffs. Trà Vinh was around fifty kilometers to the northeast of Ba Xuyên. A Khmer Krom leader named Lâm Sâm, who seemed to be formerly a Cambodian court official, declared himself a Neak Sel or holy man with supernatural powers, adorning himself with monk robes, leading the Khmer staffs and the local Khmer Krom people of Lạc Hóa to arise against Vietnam in May 1841, declaring that he would restore Cambodian monarchy, taking position at Hiếu Tử, Tiểu Cần district, in the southwestern vicinity of Trà Vinh. Local Vietnamese officials could do nothing but to flee as some of them were even killed. This Lâm Sâm rebellion did not only included the Khmers but also included the Chinese immigrants and even the defected local Vietnamese. These Khmer Krom uprisings against Vietnam were supported by the Khmer Oknhas of Cambodia who, in turn, were supervised by the Siamese leader Bodindecha.

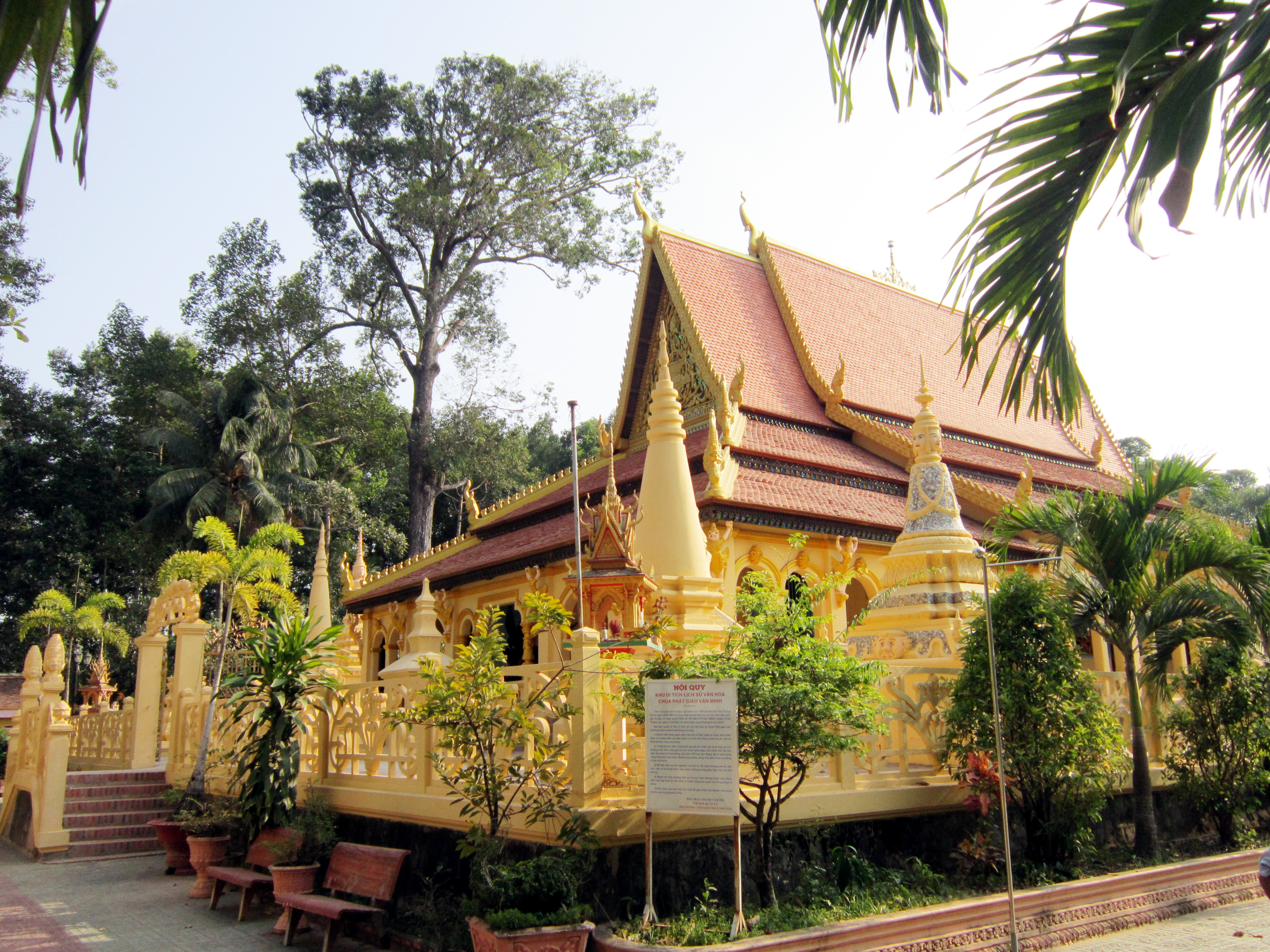
Angkorajaborey temple, a Khmer Krom Theravadin temple in Trà Vinh, Trà Vinh province, called Chùa Âng in Vietnamese.

Thiệu Trị then commanded Bùi Công Huyên to go to subdue the Lạc Hóa rebellion and Nguyễn Văn Chương to Ba Xuyên. In June 1841, Bùi Công Huyên sailed his riparian fleet from Trấn Tây citadel of Phnom Penh downstream the Bassac River to Ba Xuyên. On his way, he met a local Khmer Krom garrison of 1,000 men at Ô Môn (Khmer name: Umour, near modern Cần Thơ), where Bùi Công Huyên attacked and dispersed the Khmer Kroms. Bùi Công Huyên then sailed his fleet to Nguyệt Lãng but sent his subordinate Trần Tuyên to go first as vanguard. Trần Tuyên marched 1,000 Vietnamese men from Vĩnh Long to face the Khmer Kroms at Hiếu Tử but the Vietnamese were ambushed by the Khmers during rain, resulting in heavy casualties on the Vietnamese, with many officials including Trần Tuyên killed. Emperor Thiệu Trị was angry at Bùi Công Huyên at this humiliating defeat.

Nguyễn Văn Chương was more successful at Ba Xuyên. After the Khmer Kroms were defeated at Ô Môn, they fled to Ba Xuyên or Sóc Trăng. The Khmer filled the river with soil to obstruct the main canal of Sóc Trăng to prevent the Vietnamese from sailing to reach them, a Siamese strategy. Nguyễn Văn Chương reached Nguyễn Lương Nhàn the local Vietnamese official in Sóc Trăng, who told Nguyễn Văn Chương that they had only around 500 to 600 Vietnamese men to fight. Nevertheless, Nguyễn Văn Chương sailed his fleet by the canal and sent Nguyễn Lương Nhàn to march by land to attack the Khmer stockade at Trà Tâm, defeating and dispersing the Khmers. Nguyễn Văn Chương then destroyed the obstacle in the canal and seized control of Ba Xuyên in May 1841.

As Chaophraya Bodindecha the Siamese commander had taken Ang Duong to take position at Oudong, Ang Duong sent his Khmer forces to seize control over remaining parts of Cambodia. In June 1841, Oknha Surkealok Kas the former Pursat governor and Oknha Vibolreach Long led Khmer forces to Vĩnh Tế canal, which was an important communication line between An Giang (Châu Đốc) and Hà Tiên. The Khmer Oknhas filled the Vĩnh Tế canal with soil in order to obstruct the canal. Nguyễn Văn Chương then marched 1,000 men from Ba Xuyên to repel the Khmers from Vĩnh Tế canal, protecting the Vietnamese supply line. Nguyễn Văn Chương dredged up the canal and petitioned to the Vietnamese Emperor that the Vĩnh Tế canal had been a crucial transportation line between An Giang and Hà Tiên and the enemies were seeking to destroy it. Nguyễn Văn Chương suggested that there should be more men and fortresses to guard the canal. Thiệu Trị complied and then enforced more men to guard and built fortresses to protect the canal.

Lâm Sâm the Khmer leader of Lạc Hóa marched 3,000 men to attack Bùi Công Huyên at Nguyệt Lãng but were repelled. Thiệu Trị sent another Vietnamese commander Nguyễn Tiến Lâm from Cambodia to aid Bùi Công Huyên in Lạc Hóa. In July 1841, Lâm Sâm's ally Trần Hồng (probably a Chinese) at Ỷ La (modern Vĩnh Lợi district) to the south of Sóc Trăng, threatening Sóc Trăng. As Nguyễn Văn Chương, who was responsible for Sóc Trăng, was away at the Vĩnh Tế canal, Bùi Công Huyên and Nguyễn Tiến Lâm attacked Trần Hồng at Ỷ La, dispersing the rebels.

=== Release and return of Ang Em to Cambodia ===
Prince Ang Em was the third son of King Ang Eng, who ruled Cambodia during the period of Siamese domination. Ang Eng's successor, Ang Chan, elder half-brother of Ang Em, broke ties with Siam and approached Vietnam, putting Cambodia under Vietnamese domination. When the Siamese armies invaded Cambodia in 1812, King Ang Chan fled to Saigon but his younger brothers Ang Snguon, Ang Em and Ang Duong joined Siam and ended up living in Wang Chao Khamen in Bangkok in custody (Ang Chan and Ang Sngoun shared the same mother, Ang Em and Ang Duong had the same mother). When Prince Ang Sngoun died at Bangkok in 1816, Ang Em emerges at Siam's top candidate for the Cambodian throne. When the Siamese forces under Chaophraya Bodindecha invaded Cambodia again in 1833, Bodindecha put Ang Em and Ang Duong in Phnom Penh to rally popular support but failed as the Siamese retreated.

In 1834, the Siamese king Rama III appointed Ang Em to be the governor of Battambang, while Ang Duong was made governor of Mongkolborey, all in Siam-controlled Northwestern Cambodia. However, political conflicts soon erupted between the two princely brothers Ang Em and Ang Duong. Ang Duong planned to seize power in Battambang in 1838 but was caught and sent to Bangkok to be under house arrest. Next year, in 1839, Ang Em, resenting that Siam had failed to put him on the Cambodian throne, instigated by Trương Minh Giảng, rebelled against Siam and deported inhabitants of Battambang to defect to Vietnamese side. However, the Vietnamese Emperor Minh Mạng did not make Ang Em King of Cambodia but rather imprisoned him in Huế. Neak Neang Ros, mother of Ang Em and Ang Duong, was grounded in Saigon and Ang Em's son Ang Phim was exiled to Khánh Hòa province.

In February 1841, in response to the general Khmer uprising against Vietnamese rule, Chaophraya Bodindecha the Siamese commander released Ang Duong from Bangkok and took him to Cambodia as the Siam-sponsored candidate, eventually taking position at Oudong in May 1841. In March 1841, Nguyễn Công Trứ convinced Trương Minh Giảng to ask the Vietnamese Emperor Thiệu Trị to release Princesses Ang Mey, Ang Peou and Ang Sngoun, Ang Em's nieces and Neak Neang Ros, Ang Em's mother, from Saigon to return to Cambodia to rally popular Khmer support. These Cambodian royal ladies arrived in Cambodia in April 1841 but did not manage to incite support to Vietnam as Khmer people had become weary of Vietnamese rule, preferring Ang Duong. Nguyễn Công Trứ then himself petitioned to Thiệu Trị in July 1841 to release Ang Em;

Cambodia had been protected by the court for a long time and the Trấn Tây citadel was established for defense. For eight years, the expenditure and resources [for Cambodia] has been immeasurable yet the Khmers cannot be conscripted nor educated. Since the mutiny, thousands of officers and soldiers have died in battles, guns, ammunitions, and weapons were depleted, salaries had to be paid and boats had to be used for transportation, both in public and private sectors. Ba Xuyên and Lạc Hóa have not also been in peace. The [Southern Vietnamese] provinces have to hire soldiers and conscript people. Farmers and merchants are all suffering. The current situation is different from last year. Last year, the [Khmer] people rebelled out of fear but this year there is a man named Giun (Ang Duong) as chief who is determined to restore Cambodia so the [Khmer] people fight to their deaths. Although there is Princess Ngọc Vân (Ang Mey) but the Khmers think that women are not worthy [of support].

Nguyễn Công Trứ elaborated further that the Trấn Tây citadel of Phnom Penh alone could not withstand Siamese and Cambodian attacks from all directions. According to Thai chronicles, the Vietnamese in Phnom Penh suffered disease, famine and food shortages with a great number of Vietnamese people escaping from Phnom Penh. During 1840–1841, the Siamese captured up to 2,000 Vietnamese people fleeing the detoriorating state of Phnom Penh;

Last year, Yểm (Ang Em) surrendered, hoping to become a servant of our court. Thank to the mercy of the previous emperor [Minh Mạng], although Yểm was imprisoned, he was still given a generous salary. Now that Your Majesty the Emperor [Thiệu Trị] has ascended the throne, your grace is boundless, even those who were on death row had been pardoned. Therefore, I request that an edict be issued to assign Yểm to Trấn Tây to guard. If Yểm is released, his followers will also turn themselves in one by one. The Khmers will be divided [between Ang Em and Ang Duong] and will certainly become suspicious of each other. We will no longer have to worry [about Cambodia] in the future. We can go straight using the Khmers to convince the Khmers, forcing them to keep the places safe.

Thiệu Trị and the Vietnamese imperial court did not put high hope on Ang Em as they thought when the Khmers did not accept Ang Mey, who was a daughter of their previous king Ang Chan, the Khmers would also not accept Ang Em but Thiệu Trị also thought that releasing Ang Em would do more good than keeping Ang Em as prisoner in Huế. Perhaps Ang Em might do some benefits for Vietnam. Thiệu Trị then consented to the release of Ang Em and his son Ang Phim back to Cambodia. However, the Vietnamese imperial court still hold the top three Cambodian ministers in custody in Northern Vietnam.

=== Vietnamese withdrawal from Cambodia, End of Trấn Tây province ===
Since April 1841, things had been relatively peaceful in Cambodia. Even though the Siamese and the Vietnamese had set up two rival courts at Oudong and Phnom Penh, each promoting their candidates Ang Duong and Ang Mey, respectively, there was no major fighting. It took Ang Em about three months to reach Cambodia, leaving Huế in July 1841 and arriving in Phnom Penh on 6 October 1841. Ang Em and his son Ang Phim joined his mother Neak Neang Ros and his nieces Ang Mey, Ang Peou and Ang Sngoun in Phnom Penh. Nguyễn Công Trứ had Ang Em write words in Khmer language encouraging the Khmers to submit, placing on the placards but Ang Em, like Ang Mey, also failed to attract supporters. The condition of the Vietnamese in the Trấn Tây citadel became increasingly desperate, suffering from epidemics and food shortages. A great number of both the Cambodians and the Vietnamese people left the citadel.

Eventually, in October 1841, the highest-ranking Vietnamese commissioners of the Trấn Tây administration including Trương Minh Giảng (Tướng quân, Governor-General), Phạm Văn Điển (Kinh lược đại thần, military strategist), Nguyễn Công Trứ (Tham tán Đại thần, counselor or deputy governor), Đoàn Văn Sách (Đề đốc, military commander) and Nguyễn Công Nhàn (Lãnh binh, second commander), all jointly petitioned to Emperor Thiệu Trị for withdrawal of the Vietnamese from Cambodia;

Previously, we asked to release Yểm (Ang Em), thinking it would be an opportunity for Yểm to recruit the Khmers. But since Yểm was released, he could not do things on his own and has been relying on us. If we do not send a large army, the mission will never be accomplished. The [Vietnamese] soldiers have been fighting hard for a long time. The number of sick people is increasing everyday [due to epidemic]. If we keep holding the [Trấn Tây] citadel forever, it will only be detrimental, not helping. Please withdraw all troops [from Cambodia] to An Giang [Châu Đốc] province so that the soldiers can be relieved and the people of Nam Kỳ [Southern Vietnam] can also rest.

Thiệu Trị put this proposal to discuss with his court. Tạ Quang Cự, an official, opinioned that;

Now, in the fall season, the water is high and the roads are not open. If we deploy troops, the food supply will not be transported through. If we stay to defend it, it will only be a waste of effort and will not bring any achievements. We have considered it over and over again but there is no better strategy. It is better to temporarily withdraw the troops to An Giang [Châu Đốc] in order to strengthen our basic territory. Then we will take advantage of the situation, waiting for the opportunity to act is better.

In contrast to his predecessor Minh Mạng, who regarded the Cambodians as his subjects and sought to integrate Cambodia, Thiệu Trị put emphasis on the livelihood of the Southern Vietnamese people rather than keeping Cambodia under Vietnamese control. Thiệu Trị stated that, ever since Vietnam took control of Cambodia, Southern Vietnamese people had been suffering from military conscription and resources extraction. Thiệu Trị then consented to the Vietnamese withdrawal from Cambodia. Thiệu Trị also abolished the whole Trấn Tây administration, abolishing all of the associated titles and offices including Tướng quân, Kinh lược đại thần, Tham tán Đại thần, etc. The commissioners and officials of the defunct Trấn Tây province were to be subjected to corruption investigation under the Ministry of Justice (Hình bộ). Thiệu Trị announced to the Southern Vietnamese people that his decision to abandon Cambodia this time was for the sake of the livelihood of the Southern Vietnamese.

In late October 1841, Trương Minh Giảng had the Cham fortress of Chroy Changvar dismantled and gathered 2,000 Cambodian, Vietnamese, Chinese and Muslim Cham people who were still loyal to Vietnam to follow him to Châu Đốc. Elephants, horses and buffaloes were transported by the riparian bamboo rafts. After eight years of administering Cambodia, Trương Minh Giảng, the Vietnamese commissioners and officials along with the Cambodian royalty Ang Em, Ang Mey, Ang Peou, Ang Sngoun, Ang Phim and Neak Neang Ros, all left the Trấn Tây citadel of Phnom Penh, reaching Châu Đốc on 9 November 1841. Trương Minh Giảng was sad and depressed all the way, refusing to talk to anyone. When he arrived in Châu Đốc, he was angry and embarrassed, allowing no one to visit him and he suddenly died at Châu Đốc on that day. The Vietnamese sources stated that Trương Minh Giảng died from illness but both Cambodian and Thai chronicles agreed that he committed suicide by drinking poison, a tragic end to the Governor-General of Trấn Tây Cambodia. When the Emperor Thiệu Trị learned about the death of Trương Minh Giảng, he reminisced about Trương Minh Giảng;

Giảng was entrusted with a great responsibility. It was because he did not employ the right way to govern people and fight the enemies that the Cambodians rose up and rebelled, compelling the imperial court to send troops to suppress and capture the rebels. The mission took a long time and was not accomplished. He will be subjected to the investigation by the Ministry of Justice but, unexpectedly, the commander [Trương Minh Giảng] fell ill and died when he had just returned. I think that, several years ago, Giảng was the Tham tán quân vụ [military advisor], causing enemies [Lê Văn Khôi revolt] in Biên Hoà and Vĩnh Long to lose their nerves. He also defeated the Siamese at Thuận Cảng [Vàm Nao]. His achievements are obvious.

Vietnamese withdrawal from Cambodia in October 1841 put the end to the Trấn Tây province, which was established in 1835 and also put the end to the period of Vietnamese domination over Cambodia (1813–1841). Vietnamese withdrawal was also a victory for the rebelling Cambodian Oknhas, who had been insurrecting against Vietnamese rule since September 1840. Most importantly, it was a victory for Siam, who would soon establish domination over Cambodia, replacing Vietnam.

== Subsequent Events ==
=== Establishment of Siamese domination over Cambodia ===
Collapse of Vietnamese authority and Vietnamese withdrawal from Cambodia in early November 1841 allowed the Siamese under Chaophraya Bodindecha the Siamese supreme commander to take control over Cambodia. Siam practically replaced Vietnam as the hegemon of Cambodia. Earlier, Chaophraya Bodindecha had assigned his son Phra Phromborirak to bring the pro-Thai candidate Ang Duong from Pursat to take position at Oudong, the former royal capital of Cambodia, in May 1841, while Chaophraya Bodindecha himself with his multi-ethnic Northern Khmer-Lao-Siamese main forces continued to station at Pursat. When the Vietnamese withdrew from Cambodia in November 1841, they took the Cambodian royalty including the Prince Ang Em and the royal ladies; Princesses Ang Mey, Ang Peou, Ang Sngoun and Neak Neang Ros the mother of both Ang Em and Ang Duong down to Châu Đốc. As the Vietnamese had left, Chaophraya Bodindecha marched his multi-ethnic armies of 10,000 men from Pursat to join Ang Duong at Oudong, reaching Oudong on 2 December 1841. Bodindecha then took Ang Duong further down to take position at Phnom Penh, reaching Phnom Penh on 18 December 1841. Bodindecha saw Phnom Penh as a strategic location with four waterways connecting to all parts of Cambodia.

As Vietnam lost control over Cambodia, Siam assumed control over Cambodia for the first time since 1813, twenty-eight years ago, when the pro-Vietnamese Cambodian king Ang Chan chose to distance himself from Siamese influence in favor of Vietnam during the events of 1812–1813, after which Siam lost control over Cambodia. However, there was still an independent clique of Oknha Chakrey Nong in Southeastern Cambodia, based at Ba Phnum, not submitting to Ang Duong, to Siam nor Vietnam.

=== End of Khmer Krom uprising in Southern Vietnam ===
After the death of Trương Minh Giảng upon Vietnamese withdrawal from Cambodia in early November 1841, Phạm Văn Điển became the highest-ranking among the former Trấn Tây officials. Phạm Văn Điển assigned Ang Mey and other Khmer royal ladies to live in Châu Phú in southern vicinity of Châu Đốc. Vietnamese withdrawal from Cambodia allowed the Vietnamese to concentrate their forces and efforts on suppressing the Khmer Krom uprising in Southern Vietnam, which had ongoing for more than a year. A Khmer leader named Lâm Sâm, posing himself as a Buddhist holy man, had been rallying the Khmer Kroms and the Chinese immigrants in Southern Vietnam to insurrect against the Vietnamese rule at Ba Xuyên (Bassac, modern Sóc Trăng province) and Lạc Hóa (Preah Trapeang, modern Trà Vinh province) at the Mekong Delta. Vietnamese Emperor Thiệu Trị appointed the former Trấn Tây officials to administrative and military positions in Southern Vietnam including;

- Phạm Văn Điển was appointed as the new acting Tổng đốc An Hà or the viceroy of An Giang (Châu Đốc) and Hà Tiên provinces.
- Nguyễn Công Trứ was appointed as acting Tuần phủ sub-governor of An Giang, under Phạm Văn Điển.
- Nguyễn Văn Chương (Nguyên Tri Phương), though not a Trấn Tây official, had been known for his prominent role in suppressing the Khmer Krom rebels. Nguyễn Văn Chương was appointed as the acting Tổng đốc Long Tường or the viceroy of Vĩnh Long and Định Tường provinces.
- Lê Văn Đức, who had earlier resigned from the position of Tham tán Đại thần or deputy governor of Trấn Tây in March 1841 due to illness, was appointed as Tổng đốc Định Biên or governor of Gia Định and Biên Hòa provinces, technically the governor of Saigon.

Ba Xuyên (Bassac) was under the An Giang province, while Lạc Hóa (Preah Trapeang) was under Vĩnh Long province. The Cambodian prince Ang Em offered himself to help the Vietnamese suppressing the Khmer Krom rebellion. Phạm Văn Điển then assigned Ang Em with a regiment of Khmer Krom men who were loyal to Vietnam to join Nguyễn Văn Chương. It turned out that a large number of Khmer Krom rebels were swayed by the presence of Ang Em to lay down their arms and submit to Ang Em, who acted on behalf of Vietnam, dissolving the anti-Vietnamese Khmer Krom movement itself. Military forces from the former Trấn Tây province also strengthened Vietnamese number against the rebels. In November 1841, Nguyễn Văn Chương defeated the Khmer Krom rebels at Lạc Hóa (Preah Trapeang), capturing 7,683 rebels including the Khmer Kroms, Chinese immigrants and the Vietnamese who were dissatisfied with the government. Rebel leaders were beheaded, their heads were put on spikes for display. However, the rebel leader Lâm Sâm escaped.

Emperor Thiệu Trị did not like that Ang Em was allowed to participate in the campaigns to defeat the Khmer Krom rebels and that a large number of Khmer Krom people had submitted to Ang Em. Thiệu Trị then commanded Ang Em to go to Thất Sơn Mountains to encourage the Cambodians in Cambodia to turn away from Ang Duong and from the Siamese instead. Thai chronicles stated that Ang Em 'ruled' over 'Southern Cambodian' towns including Treang Troi Tras (Choan Chum), Toek Khmau (Cà Mau), Kramuon Sar (An Biên), Umour (Ô Môn), Moat Chruk (Tịnh Biên), Bassac (Sóc Trăng) and Preah Trapeang (Trà Vinh). In January 1842, Nguyễn Văn Chương marched from Lạc Hóa, in concert with Ang Em who marched from Châu Đốc, to defeat and disperse the last Khmer Krom stronghold at Ba Xuyên (Bassac). The Khmer Krom uprising against Vietnam, ongoing since October 1840, was technically over, although sporadic uprisings continued. Lâm Sâm the rebel leader was captured by the Khmer Kroms who were loyal to Vietnam in January 1842. Lâm Sâm was executed by slow-slicing.

=== Siamese attack on Hà Tiên and Vĩnh Tế canal (1842) ===
As the Siamese had taken control over most of Cambodia by December 1841, King Rama III or King Nangklao of Siam assigned General Bodindecha a new task to fill up and destroy the Vĩnh Tế canal, which, since its completion in 1824, had been perceived by the Siamese as a threat as the canal allowed Vietnamese naval access to the Gulf of Siam. The Siamese plan was to simultaneously attack both Hà Tiên and the Vĩnh Tế canal at Châu Đốc to distract the Vietnamese, while Bodindecha would lead forces to fill up the canal. However, Bodindecha consider this mission to be a difficult task. In January 1841, Chaophraya Bodindecha the Siamese supreme commander in Cambodia, aged 67, fell ill. The Siamese King Nangklao sent Chaophraya Yommaraj Bunnak to substitute for Bodindecha in Cambodia during Bodindecha's illness. Bodindecha recuperated in Phnom Penh, not returning to Bangkok. King Nangklao also assigned Prince Kromma Khun Itsaret Rangsan (the king's younger half-brother) and Chamuen Waiworanat Chuang Bunnag to lead the Siamese navy forces of 2,000 men, including Vietnamese-style fort-warships and some Western-style sailing ships, to attack Hà Tiên, leaving Bangkok in late January 1842. 3,000 Eastern Siamese men from Chonburi, Rayong, Chanthaburi and Trat were also conscripted to join this navy, stacking up the Siamese navy to 5,000 men.

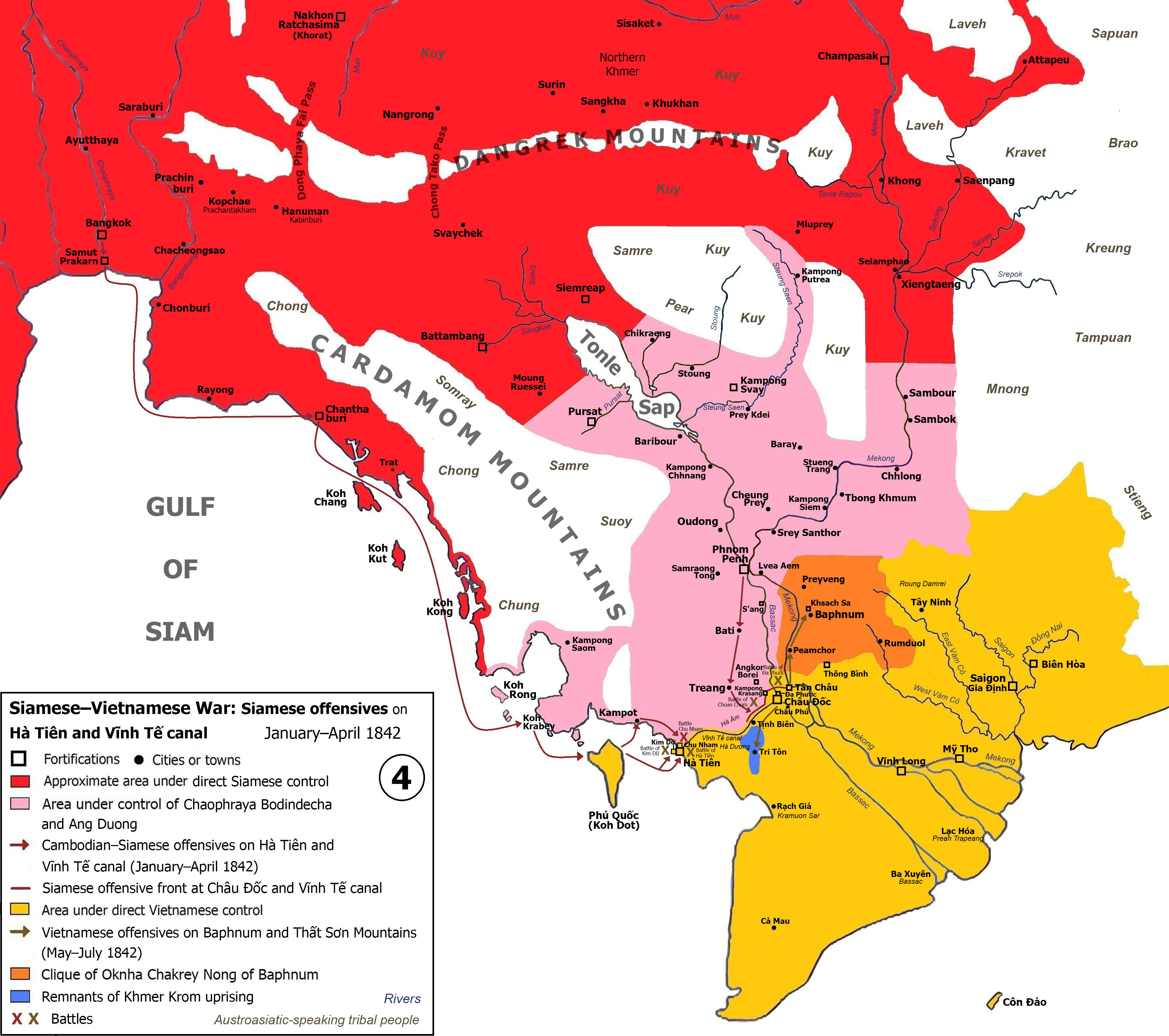
Siamese offensives on Hà Tiên and Vĩnh Tế canal (1842) In early 1842, Siam sent naval force from Bangkok to attack the Vietnamese port of Hà Tiên and sent Cambodian–Siamese land forces from Phnom Penh to attack the Vĩnh Tế canal. However, the Siamese were defeated as the Vietnamese repelled these Cambodian–Siamese attacks both from Hà Tiên in March 1842 and from Vĩnh Tế canal at Châu Đốc in April 1842.

The Siamese navy from Bangkok took position at Phú Quốc in mid-February 1842 and proceeded to attack Hà Tiên. The Vietnamese in Hà Tiên had about 5,000 men. There two forts defending Hà Tiên from this Siamese attack; Chu Nham fort to the north of Hà Tiên and Kim Dữ fort to the west of Hà Tiên. The prince Itsaret Rangsan sent Chuang Bunnag to attack Hà Tiên on 10 March 1842, attacking the Hà Tiên seafront and the Kim Dữ fort, while Eastern Siamese forces, joined by 2,000 Khmer men from Kampot, attacked the Chu Nham fort. While the Siamese navy was assaulting Hà Tiên, Chaophraya Yommaraj Bunnak the Siamese commander and Ang Duong himself led the combined Khmer–Lao–Siamese forces of 11,900 men from Phnom Penh to attack the Vĩnh Tế canal, reaching Choan Chum on the northern side of the canal on 17 March 1842. Nguyễn Văn Chương had earlier set up a line of guarding fortresses along the canal. The Cambodians–Siamese set up a line of stockades against the Vietnamese forts along the canal. Phạm Văn Điển the Tổng đốc An Hà or governor of An Giang (Châu Đốc) and Hà Tiên provinces defended Châu Đốc.

The Vietnamese defenders, led by Đoàn Văn Sách, prevailed over and repelled the Siamese attackers at Hà Tiên. On 23 March 1842, the Siamese navy to retreat from Hà Tiên, securing defensive victory for the Vietnamese. On 7 April 1842, Phạm Văn Điển the Vietnamese commander at Châu Đốc sent 3,400 Vietnamese men to attack the Siamese offensive line at the Vĩnh Tế canal. The Cambodians–Siamese at Choan Chum were soundly defeated and dispersed, suffering heavy losses and casualties. Preah Angkev Ma (uncle of Princess Ang Pen) and some other pro-Siamese Oknhas were killed in this battle. 1,200 Siamese and 2,000 Cambodians were killed in this battle, one of the most devastating and humiliating Siamese defeats in the course of Siamese–Vietnamese wars.

These Siamese defeats at Hà Tiên and Vĩnh Tế canal put the Siamese in defensive position in Cambodia. Chaophraya Bodindecha at Phnom Penh speculated Vietnamese retaliatory invasion from Châu Đốc on Phnom Penh. When the Siamese burnt down the Cambodian royal capital of Oudong in 1813, the pro-Vietnamese King Ang Chan moved the royal seat from Oudong to Phnom Penh. As Phnom Penh located lowland on the riverside, if the Siamese attacked, the Vietnamese riparian fleet would quickly come to defend Ang Chan. For this very same reason, Bodindecha found Phnom Penh to be susceptible and not defensible against prospective Vietnamese attacks. Bodindecha then decided to take Ang Duong from Phnom Penh back to Oudong in May 1842, while also assigning 8,000 Lao and Khmer men to guard Phnom Penh for him. Bodindecha ordered the Trấn Tây citadel in Phnom Penh, built earlier in 1835 to impose Vietnamese authority over Cambodia, the symbol of Vietnamese rule, dismantled in May 1842. Bodindecha also assigned Chaophraya Yommaraj Bunnak to lead 3,000 multiethnic men to build a new fortress for Ang Duong at Ponhea Lueu in southern vicinity of Oudong.

=== Siamese–Vietnamese stalemate ===
As the Vietnamese had successfully repelled the Siamese attacks on Vĩnh Tế canal and Hà Tiên, the Vietnamese then shifted focus to the eventual suppression of the remaining Khmer Krom rebels at the Thất Sơn Mountains in An Giang province near the borders with Cambodia. In April 1842, Phạm Văn Điển the viceroy of An Giang at Châu Đốc and the pro-Vietnamese Cambodian prince Ang Em led Khmer–Vietnamese forces to suppress the Khmer Krom rebellion at Thất Sơn Mountains. However, the ravaging epidemic in Southern Vietnam killed many Vietnamese commanders including Phạm Văn Điển and Đoàn Văn Sách, who died in May 1842. Emperor Thiệu Trị appointed Nguyễn Công Nhàn to be the new Tổng đốc An Hà or viceroy of An Giang and Hà Tiên provinces to replace Phạm Văn Điển. In June 1842, Lê Văn Đức the governor of Saigon, Nguyễn Văn Chương the governor of Vĩnh Long and Nguyễn Công Nhàn the ne governor at Châu Đốc, the top three governors of Cochinchina, led Vietnamese forces in one final campaign to subjugate the Khmer Kroms of the mountains. Thousands of Khmer Krom rebels, including the Chinese immigrants, were captured. The Cambodian prince Ang Em managed to convince 2,700 Khmer Krom men to lay down their arms and submit to Vietnam. After subjugating the Khmer Krom rebels, in July 1842, the three Cochinchinese governors led a Vietnamese army of 6,000 men to attack the Cambodian clique leader Oknha Chakrey Nong at Ba Phnum in Southeastern Cambodia. Chakrey Nong, upon facing Vietnamese attack, did not fight but evacuated his people to take refuge in the forest.

Siamese attack on Hà Tiên and Vĩnh Tế canal during March–April 1842 was the last Siamese offensive on Southern Vietnam in history. Chaophraya Bodindecha speculated Vietnamese retaliatory attack from Southern Vietnam after the Siamese defeats. However, Vietnamese campaigns in Cambodia had exhausted the Southern Vietnamese population so they had not yet staged a new attack to reclaim Cambodia from Siam. Exhaustion of both Siam and Vietnam in their conflict over Cambodia led to three years of undeclared truce from 1842 to 1845. The Siamese under Chaophraya Bodindecha struggled to maintain their position in Cambodia. Due to the ongoing warfare since the Cambodian uprising against Vietnamese rule in 1840, agricultural production was not possible, leading to a severe rice shortage in Cambodia. In June 1842, Bodindecha reported to the Siamese king at Bangkok that "We have been in Cambodia for three years without accomplishing anything. We are short of supplies; people are going off into the forests to live on leaves and roots; and nearly a thousand of men in our army have died from lack of food." About a thousand of Khmer, Lao and Siamese men in Cambodia died from starvation during this famine as Khmer people had to dig for tubers and roots to eat. As the Vietnamese had not come yet, Bodindecha and Ang Duong levied Khmer men to build several new fortresses along the Bassac and Mekong rivers on the way to Southern Vietnam to defend against possible Vietnamese attacks and assigned Khmer men to guard those forts. In 1842, Bodindecha and Ang Duong demanded submission from Oknha Chakrey Nong, the last remaining independent warlord. The self-proclaimed Oknha Kralahom Mouk of Preyveng submitted to Ang Duong but Chakrey Nong himself resisted. After three times of summon, Chakrey Nong eventually surrendered. Bodindecha and Ang Duong sentenced Oknha Chakrey Nong to death for defiance and disloyalty, leaving the Ba Phnum area in Southeastern Cambodia hostile to the Siamese.

Even though the Vietnamese did not endorse Ang Em as the candidate for the Cambodian throne to the same degree as the Siamese endorsing Ang Duong, Emperor Thiệu Trị did command Ang Em to rally popular Cambodian support for Vietnam. In December 1842, Thiệu Trị appointed Lê Văn Đức to be Nam Kỳ Kinh lược đại thần (南圻經略大臣) or the Military Strategist of Southern Vietnam in preparation for a Cambodian campaign but Lê Văn Đức died from illness on his journey from Huế to Southern Vietnam. In early 1843, Thiệu Trị released the top three Cambodian ministers Chauvea Tolaha Long (Trà Long), Samdach Chauponhea Hu (Nhâm Vu) and Oknha Kralahom Kinh (La Kiên), who had earlier been exiled to Northern Vietnam by the previous Emperor Minh Mạng in 1840, to return to Cambodia to help the pro-Vietnamese Cambodian royalty Ang Em and Ang Mey to rally Khmer supports and to instigate the Khmers to arise against the Siamese. The Cambodian prince Ang Em was formerly the Siamese-supported candidate but defected to Vietnamese side in December 1839. He was then imprisoned in for a year and a half by the orders of Minh Mạng until Ang Em was released by Thiệu Trị in 1841 to return to Cambodia. Ang Em died from illness at Châu Đốc in March 1843, leaving his half-niece Princess Ang Mey as the Vietnamese-supported candidate. Ang Em also left a 21-year-old son Prince Ang Phim.

Ang Duong appointed his own cadre of ministers;

- Oknha Aekkareach Prom was made Oknha Yomreach the Minister of Justice, becoming Oknha Yomreach Prom, also acting as Chauvea Tolaha or Prime Minister to Ang Duong.
- Oknha Outey Thireach Hing the leader of Samraong Tong clique was made Oknha Veang the Minister of Palace, becoming Oknha Veang Hing.
- Oknha Vongsa Anchit Mey the leader of Bati clique was made Oknha Chakrey the Minister of War, becoming Oknha Chakrey Mey.
- The self-proclaimed Oknha Kralahom Mouk of Preyveng was confirmed by Ang Duong as Kralahom the Minister of Navy.

In 1843, Ang Duong sent Oknha Veang Hing and Oknha Surkealok Muk the pro-Siamese governor of Pursat to bring tributes to the Siamese king at Bangkok, the first tribute of Ang Duong to Siam. Also in 1843, Phra Phithakbodin Som, whom Bodindecha had assigned as the acting governor of Battambang since Ang Em's defection to Cambodia in early 1840, died. Bodindecha then appointed Phra Narinyotha Nong the vice-governor of Battambang to be the new Battambang governor. During the state of famine in Cambodia, Chaophraya Bodindecha and Ang Duong conscripted Khmer men to build many fortresses to guard against prospective Vietnamese invasion. A large number of Lao and Siamese military men in Cambodia also consumed a great quantity of food. The Khmers began to feel oppressed by the Siamese. This situation was similar to the period of Vietnamese rule over Cambodia as Trấn Tây province, when the Vietnamese mobilized the Khmers for defense to 'protect' Cambodia from Siam. This time, the Siamese also mobilized the Khmers for defense to 'protect' Cambodia from Vietnam. However, Bodindecha struggled to levy Khmer men as the Khmers evaded conscriptions and deserted labor works all the time. Bodindecha faced the same problem Trương Minh Giảng had faced before him. Bodindecha was unable to effectively mobilize Khmer men to do anything.

Oknha nobles in the court of Ang Duong at Oudong became increasingly dissatisfied with Siamese influences over Cambodia. In mid-1844, Ang Duong's ministers; Oknha Chakrey Mey the Minister of War (formerly Oknha Vongsa Anchit Mey of Bati, who had earlier arisen against Vietnamese rule in 1840 with Siamese support) and Oknha Kralahom Mouk the Minister of Navy sent secret letters to Nguyễn Văn Chương the Vietnamese viceroy at Châu Đốc, offering to incite the Khmers to insurrect against Siamese rule. Eventually, in February 1845, Chaophraya Bodindecha, who had been posting as the Siamese supreme commander in Cambodia since Ang Em's defection to Vietnam in January 1840 and had been staying in Cambodia for about five years, due to the persisting rice shortage in Cambodia, decided to withdraw Lao–Siamese forces and leave Cambodia for Bangkok, leaving Phraya Narongwichai in Cambodia as the Siamese commissioner. Bodindecha's departure from Cambodia in early 1845 exposed Ang Duong to Vietnamese threats and would eventually lead to the renewed Vietnamese offensives on Cambodia in July 1845.

=== Siamese–Vietnamese joint suzerainty over Cambodia ===
In May 1845, Ang Duong and the Siamese commissioner Phraya Narongwichai discovered secret letters of Oknha Chakrey Mey, Oknha Bavoreach Ros and other conspirators who had been planning to bring in Vietnamese forces into Cambodia to overthrow Ang Duong and the Siamese. Oknha Chakrey Mey was apprehended and executed, while Oknha Bavoreach Ros fled to Srey Santhor, where Bavoreach Ros and other accomplices arose in rebellion against Ang Duong and against Siamese domination over Cambodia. Ang Duong at Phnom Penh quickly sent forces to put the down the rebellion at Srey Santhor as Bavoreach Ros fled to the Vietnamese at Tây Ninh. Nguyễn Văn Chương (Nguyễn Tri Phương) the Tổng đốc An Hà or governor of An Giang and Hà Tiên provinces saw this anti-Siamese rebellion in Cambodia as the long-awaited opportunity for Vietnam to retake control over Cambodia. Vietnamese Emperor Thiệu Trị sent Võ Văn Giải the Tổng đốc Định Biên governor of Saigon to be the supreme commander of this new Vietnamese offensive campaign into Cambodia. Vietnamese riparian fleet sailed into Southeastern Cambodia in July 1845, defeating the Cambodians under Ang Duong at Peam Meanchey and Banteay Daek, taking control of Ba Phnum area of Southeastern Cambodia. The Siamese king, upon learning about this renewed Vietnamese attack on the Siam-dominated Cambodia, sent Chaophraya Bodindecha to bring 40,000 Khmer–Lao–Siamese men to defend Cambodia. With Vietnamese victories, Võ Văn Giải proposed to install Prince Ang Phim (son of Ang Em), Ang Duong's nephew, as King of Cambodia.

At the peak of flooding season, Nguyễn Văn Chương and his second-in-command Doãn Uẩn led the Vietnamese fleet to attack the inundated Phnom Penh in September 1845, successfully conquering Phnom Penh. After Vietnamese withdrawal from Trấn Tây Phnom Penh in November 1841, four years ago, the Vietnamese then set foot in Phnom Penh again. Defeated at Phnom Penh, the Cambodians and Siamese under Ang Duong and Phraya Narongwichai suffered heavy losses and had to retreat to Oudong, where Chaophraya Bodindecha and the bulk of his armies stood ground. Nguyễn Văn Chương and Doãn Uẩn led their fleet from Phnom Penh to attack Oudong in September but faced strong Siamese resistance. Bodindecha released a herd of elephants to trample the Vietnamese in the outskirts of Oudong. The Battle of Oudong resulted in stalemate as both the Siamese and the Vietnamese retained their positions inside of Oudong citadel and at the riverside, respectively, but they were unable to prevail over each other. Battle resumed in November 1845 but only resulted in attrition. The Vietnamese were unable to take Oudong, while the Siamese were unable to dislodge the Vietnamese attackers. Eventually, in December 1845, the Siamese and the Vietnamese talked for a peace deal.

Chaophraya Bodindecha the Siamese commander met with Nguyễn Văn Chương the Vietnamese commander at Pupey in the eastern outskirts of Oudong. In this Siamese–Vietnamese peace agreement of December 1845, Vietnam would accept Ang Duong as King of Cambodia on condition that Ang Duong would profess himself to be a vassal of Vietnam (also Siam), sending tributes to Huế. Ang Duong would also give up all claims to the Khmer Kroms of Southern Vietnam. Vietnam would then repatriate Ang Duong's mother Neak Neang Ros (who had been taken by Ang Em to Vietnam in 1840), Ang Duong's three daughters and other members of Cambodian royal family including Ang Mey to Ang Duong. In February 1846, the Vietnamese under Nguyễn Văn Chương left the Oudong battlefield to take position at Phnom Penh. The Vietnamese also brought the Châu Đốc-resided members of Cambodia royal family including the princesses Ang Mey, Ang Peou, Ang Sngoun, the Prince Ang Phim and Neak Neang Ros, Ang Duong's mother and daughters, to Phnom Penh. Cambodia was then divided into Siamese and Vietnamese occupations, with the Vietnamese holding Phnom Penh and Ba Phnum area of Southeastern Cambodia and Ang Duong, based in Oudong under Siamese support, holding the rest of Cambodia. Tension remained high through 1846 as the Siamese king and the Vietnamese emperor were reluctant to accept the peace deal brokered by their field commanders. The Vietnamese returned Ang Duong's mother Neak Neang Ros and Ang Duong's three daughters to Ang Duong in October 1846 but retained Ang Mey and the Cambodian royal regalia including Preah Khan Reach the Royal Sword.

In December 1846, Nguyễn Văn Chương delivered an ultimatum; if the Siamese did not fulfill the peace term by allowing Ang Duong to send tributes to the Vietnamese Emperor and by returning Vietnamese captives, the war would resume. As the Vietnamese were assembling troops for the upcoming new offensive, Chaophraya Bodindecha eventually allowed Ang Duong to submit to Vietnam, while also reporting to the Siamese king Nangklao at Bangkok about the necessity of letting Cambodia to be under joint Siamese–Vietnamese suzerainty. Ang Duong sent his delegated in January 1847 to bring tributary goods to Emperor Thiệu Trị at Huế to submit himself as a vassal of Vietnam. Thiệu Trị responded by appointing both Ang Duong and Ang Mey as co-rulers of Cambodia with the Vietnamese delegates holding a Confucian-style enthronement ceremony for Ang Duong as Cao Miên quốc vương (高棉國王) or King of Cambodia at Oudong in May 1847, while Ang Mey was also appointed as Cao Miên quận chúa (高棉郡主) or Queen Regnant of Cambodia. Also in May, Võ Văn Giải released Queen Ang Mey, Prince Ang Phim and the rest of Cambodian royals, along with the royal regalia, to Ang Duong, thus reuniting the Cambodian royal family scattered among pro-Siam and pro-Vietnam factions since 1813. The Vietnamese withdrew their troops from Cambodia in May 1847, terminating Vietnamese intervention in Cambodia. Even though Ang Mey was appointed by Vietnam as a ruler in her own right, Ang Duong's court and the Siamese did not accept this notion and Ang Mey ended up without having any real power, as she had been before during the period of Trấn Tây province (1835–1841) of Cambodia under direct Vietnamese rule.

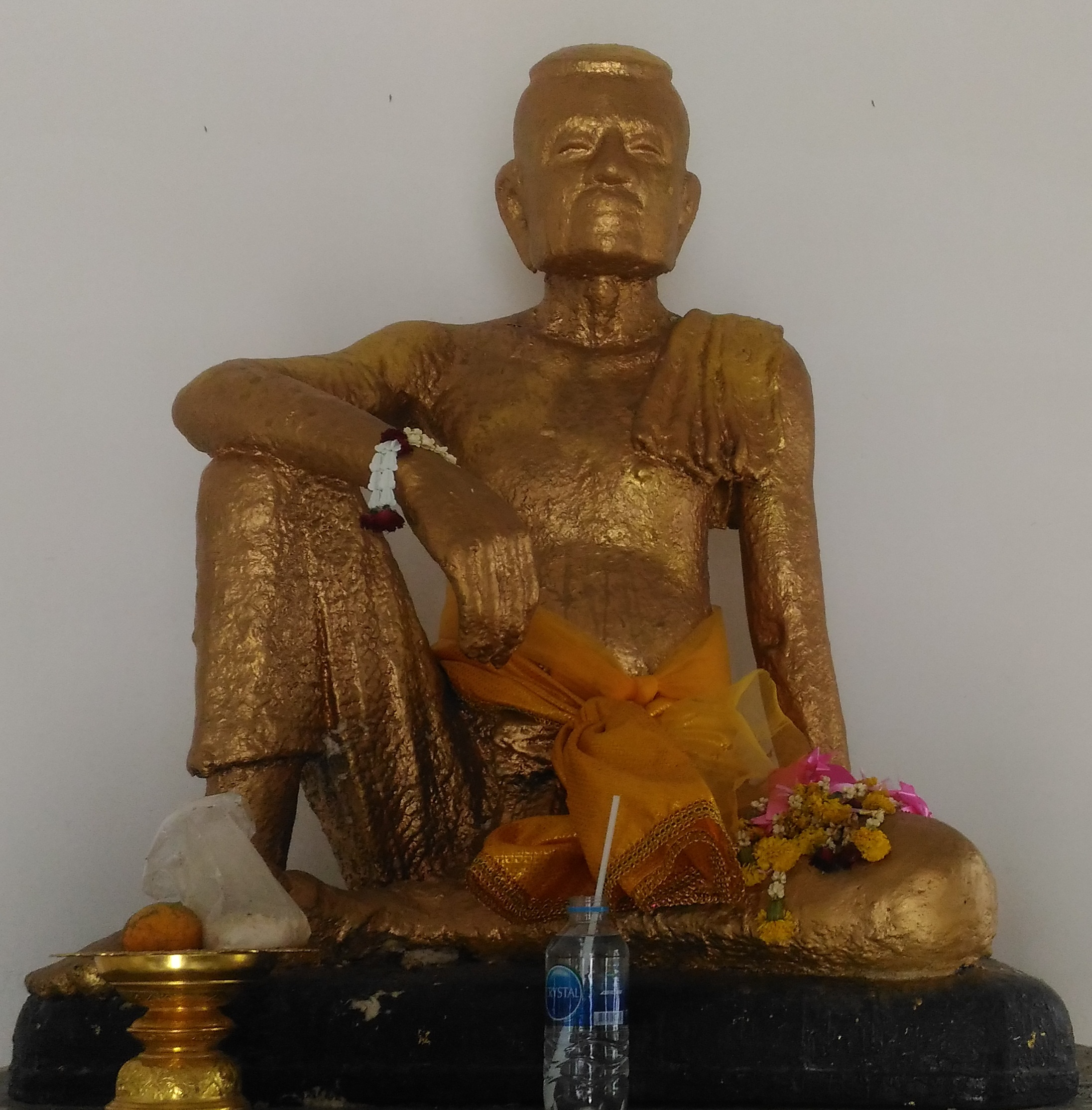
Statue of Chaophraya Bodindecha at Wat Chakkrawat temple in Bangkok, built in 1898, is said to be a replica of the original statue of Bodindecha built by King Ang Duong in Oudong.

In January 1848, the Siamese king Rama III or King Nangklao had Phraya Phetphichai (earlier known as Phraya Ratchanikun) bring the Suvarṇapaṭṭa or gold plate inscribed with Ang Duong's regnal name and Siamese Hindu Brahmins from Bangkok to Oudong, where, in March 1848, Chaophaya Bodindecha and Phraya Phetphichai presided over a Hindu enthronement ceremony for Ang Duong as King Preahbat Samdech Preah Harireak Reamea Issathipadei Srey Soriyopear (Khmer: ព្រះបាទសម្ដេចព្រះហរិរក្សរាមាឥស្សាធិបតីស្រីសុរិយោពណ៌, Thai: สมเด็จพระหริรักษ์รามาธิบดีศรีสุริโยพรรณ), during which both Cambodian and Siamese Brahmins participated. Chaophraya Bodindecha and his Lao–Siamese armies left Cambodia in April 1848 in his final departure from Cambodia, ending Siamese intervention in Cambodia for a time being. For the first time several decades, there were no Siamese nor Vietnamese troops in Cambodia. Even though Ang Duong professed himself to be a vassal of both Siam and Vietnam, sending tributes to Siam annually and to Vietnam triennially, it was Siam who exerted real influences over Ang Duong. To demonstrate his loyalty to Siam, Ang Duong sent his 15-year-old eldest son Prince Ang Reacheavodey (Norodom) and his nephew Prince Ang Phim to Siamese court at Bangkok as hostages, where they stayed at Wang Chao Khamen or Cambodian Palace quarters, which had been the residence of the Cambodian royalty in Siam since 1792. Chaophraya Bodindecha, who had been the Siamese supreme commander in Cambodia for fifteen years from 1833 to 1848, died in June 1849 at the age of 73. At the death of Bodindecha, King Ang Duong built a statue for Bodindecha in Oudong and held memorial services for Bodindecha yearly.

== Notes ==
Footnote

Citations

== See also ==
- Cambodian rebellion (1811–12)
- Cambodian rebellion (1820)
- Vietnamese invasions of Cambodia
- Siamese–Vietnamese War (1841–1845)
- Battle of Rạch Gầm-Xoài Mút
- Hà Tiên Rebellion (1840)
- Ba Xuyên Rebellion (1841)
- Thất Sơn Rebellion (1841)
- Lâm Sâm Rebellion
