= Chaophraya Aphaiphubet (Baen) =

Siamese general

- เจ้าพระยาอภัยภูเบศร (แบน) ចៅពញាអភ័យធីបែស បែន

Siam-appointed Governor of Battambang
- In office 1794–1809
- Monarch: Rama I
- Preceded by: Office created
- Succeeded by: Phraya Aphaiphubet (Baen)

Chauvea Tolaha Prime Minister of Cambodia
- In office 1782–1794
- Monarch: Ang Eng
- Preceded by: Chauvea Tolaha Mou
- Succeeded by: Chauvea Tolaha Pok

Personal details
- Died: November 1809 Battambang

Chaophraya Aphaiphubet (Baen) (Thai: เจ้าพระยาอภัยภูเบศร (แบน), Khmer: ចៅពញាអភ័យធីបែស បែន, ?–November 1809), also known as Chauvea Tolaha Ben (Khmer: ចៅហ្វាទឡ្ហៈបែន) or Chaofa Talaha (Baen) (Thai: เจ้าฟ้าทะละหะ (แบน)) or Chau Hua Pen (Khmer: ចៅហ្វ៊ាបែន), was the Regent of Cambodia during the minority of the Cambodian king Ang Eng under Siam's influences and eventually became the first of the line of Siam-appointed governors of Battambang or Phra Tabong. He was known in Vietnamese texts as Chiêu Thùy Biện (昭錘卞). He is officially regarded as the founder of House of Abhaiwongse.

== Serving King Ang Non ==
Baen was a Cambodian noble with the title Oknya Yomreach (ឧកញ៉ាយោមរាជ, Thai counterpart of this title was Phraya Yommarat พระยายมราช). Oknya Yomreach Pen or Baen was the Cambodian Minister of Justice in the reign of the pro-Siamese Cambodian king Ang Non. According to Battambang Samay Lok Mchas or "Battambang during the time of Lord Governor" by Tauch Chhoung, published in 1974, Baen originated from Treang in modern Takeo Province. Baen served Prince Ang Non. He probably accompanied Ang Non during political flight from Cambodia to Ayutthaya in 1758 and followed King Ang Non, who, in turn, followed Phraya Tak the Chinese–Siamese mandarin, breaking through the Burmese siege out of Ayutthaya in 1767. Phraya Tak later became King Taksin of the Siamese Thonburi kingdom.

=== Siamese Invasion of Cambodia: 1771–1773 ===
King Taksin sent Siamese forces under Phraya Yommarat Thongduang (Rama I) to invade Cambodia in 1771 to bring Ang Non, the pro-Siamese contender, to the Cambodian throne. The incumbent pro-Vietnamese Cambodian king Ang Ton fled to Saigon, requesting aid from the Nguyen Lord of Cochinchina Nguyễn Phúc Thuần, who sent Vietnamese forces to repel the Siamese and restore Ang Ton in 1772. When the Siamese retreated from Cambodia in 1773, Ang Non and presumably Baen took position at Kampot in Southwestern Cambodia in resistance against Ang Ton.

In 1771, the three Tây Sơn brothers arose against the Nguyen Lord regime, killing the Nguyen Lord Nguyễn Phúc Thuần in 1777. With the Nguyen support dwindling, the pro-Nguyen Cambodian king Ang Ton decided to abdicate in favor of his rival Ang Non in 1774. Baen, a follower of Ang Non, thus became Oknha Yomreach the Cambodian Minister of Justice under King Ang Non. The former king Ang Ton demoted himself to Uprayorach or Second King in 1774 to give way for Ang Non to take the throne. Ang Ton died from illness in 1777.

=== Cambodian dynastic conflict of 1779 ===
In 1779, Chauvea Tolaha Mou the Chief Minister of Cambodia and Oknha Decho Ten the governor of Kampong Svay, the two brothers, rebelled against the Siam-aligned King Ang Non. When King Ang Non was marching out to fight the rebel brothers, another Cambodian official Oknha Vibolreach Sous made his own bid for power by bringing in Vietnamese armies under Đỗ Thanh Nhơn to seize power in Oudong the Cambodian royal capital, murdering all four sons of Ang Non and placing the seven-year-old king Ang Eng as King of Cambodia. Tolaha Mou and Decho Ten captured King Ang Non in battle and had Ang Non drowned to death in Boeng Khayong Pond in September 1779.

Even though the separate insurrections of Tolaha Mou and Vibolreach Sous were unrelated, they achieved the common goal of overthrowing King Ang Non and they formed an uneasy alliance under the reign of the new young king Ang Eng. Oknha Yomreach Pen or Baen, even though in the pro-Siamese camp of King Ang Non, was spared from death due to Baen being a 'sworn friend' of Vibolreach Sous, who was elevated to the position of Kralahom or Minister of Navy, becoming Oknha Kralahom Sous (ឧកញ៉ាក្រឡាហោម (សួស)). Chauvea Tolaha Mou spared Yomreach Baen but also putting Baen under political house arrest at Kampong Svay, where his brother Oknha Decho Ten was the governor.

== Political exile in Siam ==
=== Imprisonment in Thonburi ===
King Taksin of Thonburi, the King of Siam, was very upset at the murder of King Ang Non at the hands of Tolaha Mou because King Ang Non, formerly Prince Ang Non, was a close companion of Taksin from the time before their ascensions to Cambodian and Siamese thrones. Taksin blamed Oknha Yomreach Baen or his inaction as Baen had not done enough to protect Ang Non. By that time, there was another Cambodian official Preah Angkev Duong in hostage in Thonburi, the Siamese royal capital. Taksin sent Preah Angkev Duong to Kampong Svay, demanding for Oknha Yomreach Baen to go to Thonburi to face punishments from Taksin. Tolaha Mou and Decho Ten, who had no ties with Yomreach Baen whatsoever, delivered Yomreach Baen to Thonburi. At Thonburi, Baen was reportedly canned with wooden strokes, his ear pinnae partially cut off, imprisoned but Chaophraya Chakri Thongduang, the Chief Minister of Thonburi, intervened to have Baen pardoned and released. Baen then became a loyal subordinate of Chakri.

=== Siamese Invasion of Cambodia: 1781–1782 ===
Seeking vengeance for murder of King Ang Non at the hands of Tolaha Mou and the Vietnamese, King Taksin sent out Siamese armies of 20,000 men to invade Cambodia in three directions into Siemreap, Battambang and Kampong Svay in December 1781, intending to punish Tolaha Mou and to install his own son Prince Inthraphithak as the King of Cambodia. Chaophraya Chakri Thongduang and Chaophraya Surasi led Siamese armies to invade Cambodia, taking commanding position at Siemreap. Baen was assigned to lead a Cambodian regiment under Siam to support Prince Inthraphithak as vanguard to attack Oudong, the Cambodian royal capital.

Chauvea Tolaha Mou took defensive position at Kampong Luong just north of Oudong, while Oknha Kralahom Sous led Cambodian riparian fleet into Tonle Sap to defend against the invading Siamese. Nguyễn Phúc Ánh the Nguyen Lord of Cochinchina to send Vietnamese armies under the Nguyễn Hữu Thụy to counter this Siamese invasion of Cambodia. Yomreach Baen, serving under Siam, led the army of Prince Inthraphithak, son of King Taksin, marching from Siemreap all the way through Battambang and Baribour, approaching Oudong. Nguyễn Hữu Thụy the Vietnamese commander took position at Chroy Changvar, commanding Oknha Yomreach Peang to defend against the Siamese at Kaoh Chen, opposite of Longvek on Tonle Sap River. Yomreach Baen's Cambodian–Siamese forces engaged with Cambodian–Vietnamese forces of Yomreach Peang at Peam Chumnik in Longvek.

While Chaophraya Chakri was supervising Siamese military campaign in Cambodia from Siemreap, Phraya San seized power in Thonburi in March 1782, forcing King Taksin to abdicate. Political disruption at Thonburi compelled Chakri to halt his Cambodian campaign, reaching a truce with the Vietnamese and returned to Thonburi. This Siamese invasion of Cambodia was thus cut short by instability at home. When Chaophraya Chakri had taken control of Thonburi, in April 1782, Chaophraya Surasi commanded Baen to surround Prince Inthraphithak with his own Cambodian forces to keep Inthraphithak uninformed about events in Thonburi. Inthraphithak, unaware that his father King Taksin had been executed and the regime had changed, sent a complaint to Thonburi, saying that Baen had turned rebellious and his Cambodian men were surrounding him. Inthraphithak broke free from Baen's encirclement and realized the situation. Inthraphithak was eventually captured and executed at Thonburi.

== Struggle in Cambodia ==
=== First attempt to seize power in Cambodia ===
Chaophraya Chakri ascended as King Rama I in 1782, founding the Chakri dynasty. Baen had instrumental role in the ascension of the king. Formerly a Cambodian minister, Baen then became a loyal aide of the Siamese king. Meanwhile, in Cambodia, Oknha Kralahom Sous had declared himself Samdech Chauponhea or Second Chief Minister, second only to the Chauvea Tolaha himself. Uneasy pact between Chauvea Tolaha Mou and Samdech Chauponhea Sous began to crumble. Sous decided to get rid of Tolaha Mou altogether. Sous sent a secret letter to his 'sworn friend' Yomreach Baen at Bangkok, asking Baen to join him in Cambodia to overthrow the rule of Tolaha Mou.

Yomreach Baen told King Rama I of Siam about this secret letter from his friend in Cambodia. The Siamese king saw this as an opportunity to expand Siamese influence into Cambodia. King Rama allowed Baen to bring forces into Cambodia to seize power. Samdech Chauponhea Sous personally waited for Baen at Battambang as escorted Baen to Oudong, where they conspired to overthrow Tolaha Mou the Cambodian Prime Minister. Sous and Baen led forces to capture Tolaha Mou, who fled to Bassac (Ba Thắc, in modern Sóc Trăng province at the mouth Bassac River) but the Cambodian governor of Bassac arrested Tolaha Mou and sent him back to Oudong, where Tolaha Mou was executed in October 1782. Pact of these 'sworn friends' Sous and Baen in Cambodia lasted only for two months until Baen eventually murdered Sous in December 1782, taking all power to himself. Baen declared himself Chauvea Tolaha or Prime Minister of Cambodia, also allying with Oknha Kralahom Pok the caretaker of young king Ang Eng. The ten-year-old king Ang Eng had been a powerless puppet king since his ascension in 1779 while his powerful ministers vied for power in Cambodia.

Oknha Decho Ten, governor of Kampong Svay and brother of Tolaha Mou, was still standing against Baen at Kampong Svay. When Yomreach Baen sent his forces under Oknha Chakrey Kep to attack Kampong Svay, the Chams of Tbong Khmum, under leadership of a Cham official Tuan Set or Tuan Syed Abdul Romduol, sailed their riparian fleet to attack Oudong. Facing Cham attack, Yomreach Baen fell back. Panicked, Oknha Kralahom Pok, fearing danger for the young king Ang Eng, decided to take Ang Eng, along with his sisters Princesses Ang E and Ang Pen, to take refuge in Bangkok. First attempt of Baen to seize power in Cambodia was jeopardized by the sudden unexpected attack of the Chams from Tbong Khmum. Baen, along with Kralahom Pok and Ang Eng, had to retreat from Cambodia, seeking refuge in Siam in Bangkok, the new royal capital of Siam, as the Chams under Tuan Syed seized Oudong the Cambodian royal capital.

In Bangkok, King Rama I assigned a residence for the Cambodian king Ang Eng at Sanam Kraboe or Buffalo Meadows just off the northern city wall of Bangkok in modern Banglamphu, Chana Songkhram subdistrict, Phra Nakhon district of Bangkok to host King Ang Eng as political refugee and prisoner along with his followers including Baen and Kralahom Pok. King Rama I reportedly 'adopted' the young Cambodian king Ang Eng as his adopted son.

=== Occupation of Western Cambodia ===
In 1783, Nguyễn Phúc Ánh the Nguyen Lord of Cochinchina, defeated by the Tây Sơn, ended up taking refuge in Bangkok. In the same year, in 1783, King Rama I appointed Baen with a Siamese title Chaophraya Aphaiphubet (Chauponhea Apheythibes in Cambodian chronicles) as the Regent of Cambodia in efforts to bring forward Siamese influence into Cambodia. Chaophraya Aphaiphubet Baen, who was also claiming the position of Chauvea Tolaha, occupied western half of Cambodia in 1783, sending his subordinates Oknha Chakrey Kep to station at Pursat and Oknha Yomreach Kan at Siemreap, while Baen himself took position at Battambang in Northwestern Cambodia. After expelling Baen from Oudong, Tuan Syed led the Chams to station at Lvea Aem. Oknha Decho Ten, governor of Kampong Svay and brother of the deceased Tolaha Mou, declared himself Chauvea Tolaha or Prime Minister or Regent of Cambodia. Chauvea Tohala Ten marched from Kampong Svay to attack Lvea Aem in March 1784, killing Tuan Syed the Cham leader and expelling the Chams from the area. Tolaha Ten also received support from Trương Văn Đa the Tây Sơn commander at Saigon, who brought in Vietnamese forces to subdue the Chams. Tolaha then seized power in Cambodia with support from the Tây Sơn.

In April 1784, King Rama I sent his nephew Prince Thepharirak to bring Siamese forces to attack Saigon in Cochinchina against the Tây Sơn in order to restore Nguyễn Phúc Ánh to power in Vietnam. Chaophraya Aphaiphubet Baen was assigned to bring 5,000 Cambodian men under his command to join this campaign. Baen was also assigned to bring his Cambodian forces from Battambang to join the main Siamese forces at Bassac (in modern Sóc Trăng province) to conquer Saigon. However, the campaign ended up with the Siamese defeat by the Tây Sơn in the Battle of Rạch Gầm-Xoài Mút in January 1785. Aphaiphubet himself could only march to Longvek where he was defeated and pushed back by the Tây Sơn forces.

=== War with Tây Sơn ===
These Tây Sơn victories allowed the Tây Sơn to exert control over the eastern half of Cambodia, while the western half was under the pro-Siamese agent Chaophraya Aphaiphubet Baen. When the young Cambodian king Ang Eng was staying at Wang Chao Khamen palace in Bangkok, there was no king in Cambodia. Cambodia was divided into two halves, with the eastern half under the rule of Chauvea Tolaha Ten, formerly Oknha Decho Ten, at Oudong with support from the Tây Sơn and the western half under Chaophraya Aphaiphubet Baen, who also claimed to be Chauvea Tolaha, at Battambang. There were two Cambodian courts under two Regents of Cambodia with competing claims, each with their own set of Oknha officials, each in Battambang and in Oudong, each supported by Siam and Tây Sơn. Baen had been in control of Battambang and Northwestern Cambodia since 1783. Cambodian chronicles stated that two Vietnamese Tây Sơn officials named Ong Chor Ma and Ong Thung Binh came to exert power in Cambodia. In 1785, the Tây Sơn sent Oknha Yomreach Koy to attack Battambang. Baen defended Battambang. Oknha Yomreach Koy was shot dead in battle.

Conflicts between Tây Sơn leaders Nguyễn Nhạc and Nguyễn Huệ weakened Tây Sơn power in Southern Vietnam. After four years of political refuge and exile in Bangkok, Nguyễn Phúc Ánh brought his fleet to successfully gain foothold in Cochinchina or Southern Vietnam in 1788. Chaophraya Aphaiphubet Baen took this opportunity to make his own moves against his rival, the Tây Sơn-backed Chauvea Tolaha Ten. In 1788, Baen sent his two commanders Oknha Chakrey Kep and Oknha Yomreach Kan to successfully seize Oudong, prompting Chauvea Tolaha Ten to flee to Saigon under protection of Phạm Văn Tham, the Tây Sơn leader at Saigon. Chakrey Kep and Yomreach Kan pursued Tolaha Ten towards the Mekong Delta to Saigon. Cambodian and Thai chronicles stated that when Nguyễn Phúc Ánh reached Prek Thleang, Ong Choc Sim (presumably Phạm Văn Tham) came out to attack Nguyễn Phúc Ánh. Oknha Chakrey Kep and Oknha Yomreach Kan led Baen's Cambodian armies to help Nguyễn Phúc Ánh at Prek Thleang, allowing Nguyễn Phúc Ánh to prevail over Phạm Văn Tham.

Nguyễn Phúc Ánh captured Saigon in September 1788. Ong Choc Sim or Phạm Văn Tham and Chauvea Tolaha Ten fled from Saigon to Bassac (Ba Thắc). Oknha Chakrey Kep joined Nguyễn Phúc Ánh in their attack on Bassac, resulting in the surrender of Phạm Văn Tham. Eventually, Oknha Chakrey Kep captured Chauvea Tolaha Ten in February 1790. Tolaha Ten and other pro-Tây Sơn Cambodian officials were arrested and brought to Baen at Battambang. Baen executed many of the Tây Sơn-aligned Cambodian officials but chose to spare Tolaha Ten and sent Tolaha Ten to Bangkok, where Ten was again spared by the Siamese King Rama. With the pro-Siamese Chaophraya Aphaiphubet Baen prevailing over the pro-Tây Sơn Chauvea Tolaha Ten in 1790, Cambodia was united under Baen, bringing Cambodia into Siamese influence.

== Regent of Cambodia ==
Eventually, in 1790, Chaophraya Aphaiphubet Baen managed to bring forces to seize power at Oudong and took control of Cambodia, ousting Chauvea Tolaha Ten, who was taken as prisoner to Bangkok. Baen's victory in Cambodia in 1790 put Cambodia under Siamese influence. Cambodian nobles beseeched the Siamese King Rama I to allow the young king Ang Eng to return to Cambodia to rule but King Rama decided not to allow King Ang Eng to return to Cambodia yet, citing that Ang Eng was too young to rule. The Siamese king kept Ang Eng in Bangkok to 'protect' the young Cambodian king from dangerous power struggle of the Cambodian court, according to Thai historiography. By these means, King Rama I sent Chaophraya Aphaiphubet Baen to Oudong to administer Cambodia as the Regent on behalf of King Ang Eng, who stayed in Bangkok. After going to Siam in 1779, staying in Siam for five years and then moved to Battambang in 1783, staying in Battambang for seven years, Chaophraya Aphaiphubet Baen triumphantly entered to take position at Oudong the Cambodian royal capital in 1790 as the Regent of Cambodia under Siamese auspices.

Nguyễn Phúc Ánh ("Chao Anam Kok" or "King of Annam" in Thai Chronicles), also a political refugee in Bangkok, managed to retake Saigon from the Tây Sơn in 1788. The Siamese king Rama I commanded Baen, as the Regent of Cambodia, to support and supply Nguyễn Phúc Ánh with troops and provisions for Nguyễn Phúc Ánh's campaign against the Tây Sơn. The Siamese court viewed both Baen and Nguyễn Phúc Ánh as pioneers for expansion of Siamese interests in the region of Cambodia and Southern Vietnam and wished for them to cooperate. However, discord soon arose between Baen and Ánh, who soon became enemies rather than allies. According to Thai chronicles, Chaophraya Aphaiphubet Baen sent a complaint to the Siamese king that Nguyễn Ánh's Vietnamese officials attacked Baen's Cambodian subordinate officials. Nguyễn Ánh also sent a complaint to King Rama in 1790, saying that Baen the Regent of Cambodia was planning to attack him. Nguyễn Ánh said that Baen had been raising his Cambodian troops and building war junks to attack Ánh's position at Saigon. The Siamese king Rama could only express his best intention to both Chaophraya Aphaiphubet and the Chao Anam Kok, urging both of them to cooperate.

In 1791, the Siamese king Rama I ordered Chaophraya Aphaiphubet Baen to bring 10,000 Cambodian men from Cambodia to dig a canal near Wat Saket temple. Next year, in 1792, King Rama I constructed a new larger, grander palace for Cambodian King Ang Eng called Wang Chao Khamen or "Cambodian Prince Palace" near Wat Saket temple in the southeastern perimeter outside of Bangkok's city moat in modern Ban Bat, Pomprap Sattruphai district of Bangkok.

== Governor of Battambang ==
=== Becoming Governor of Battambang ===
Chaophraya Aphaiphubet Baen was appointed by Siamese king Rama I as the Siam-aligned Regent of Cambodia in 1783 but could only actually assume power in Cambodia when he defeated his rival Chauvea Tohala Ten in 1790. For four years, during 1790–1794, from Oudong, Chaophraya Aphaiphubet Baen administered Cambodia on behalf of the young Cambodian king Ang Eng who was kept as hostage at Wang Chao Khamen in Bangkok and also on behalf of the Siamese king Rama. In 1794, when Ang Eng was twenty-two years old, King Rama I of Siam decided to allow the Cambodian king Ang Eng to return to Cambodia to rule in person. King Rama granted Ang Eng the regnal name Somdet Phra Narairama or Preah Noreay Reacheathireach in November 1794. King Rama also appointed Oknha Kralahom Pok, the long-time protector of Ang Eng since childhood, as the new Chauvea Tolaha or Cambodian Prime Minister, becoming Chauvea Tolaha Pok. Chaophraya Aphaiphubet Baen thus gave up his position of Cambodian Regent and Prime Minister to Pok.

However, in order to allow Ang Eng to return to Cambodia to rule, King Rama had to arrange for a political settlement between Ang Eng and Chaophraya Aphaiphubet Baen. Baen and Ang Eng originated from two opposing political camps of the 1770s. Baen had served King Ang Non, who was overthrown and executed in a coup of 1779 that placed Ang Eng on the throne. The Siamese king foresaw that, if Baen were to become a subject of King Ang Eng at Oudong, discord would soon arise between Baen and Ang Eng or Kralahom Pok the protector of Ang Eng.

Moreover, the Siamese king Rama I viewed Baen as a meritorious subject. Baen had an instrumental role in the events of 1782 that allow King Rama to assume the throne. In the 1780s, Chaophraya Aphaiphubet Baen had fought with blood and sweat to establish Siamese domination in Cambodia, defeating many rivals. Letting Baen to be a mere minister under King Ang Eng was undeserving for Baen, in the eyes of the Siamese king. Baen and his pro-Siamese Cambodian forces had been taking position at Battambang since 1783, where he stayed for seven years during 1783–1790, during which Baen and his pro-Siamese clique controlled Western half of Cambodia, from Battambang to Siemreap and to Pursat, until taking over the whole of Cambodia in 1790. King Rama I of Siam decided to reward Chaophraya Aphaiphubet Baen for his unrelenting devotion to Siamese cause by granting Baen the governorship of Battambang (Phra Tabong Thai: พระตะบอง) as Chao Mueang. In the words of Thai historiography;

At that point the king (Rama I) gave thought to the fact that Chaophraya Aphaiphubet (Baen) had ruled Krung Kambuja for a long time and, unlike Nak Ong-Eng (Ang Eng), the newly-enthroned lord of Kambuja, had earned a reward. So a royal order granted the territory of Muang Phratabong (Battambang) and Muang Siamrat (Siemreap) to Chaophraya Aphaiphubet (Baen) who was to act as the king's representative and be directly subordinate to Krungthep (Bangkok). Nak Ong-Eng was pleased with this and turned over the territory as the king wished.

Siamese king Rama I separated the two srok of Battambang and Siemreap, approximately composing of modern Northwestern Cambodia, from Cambodia and gave them to Chaophraya Aphaiphubet Baen to govern as a part of inner proper territory of Siam. Chaophraya Aphaiphubet Baen would not be a subject of the Cambodian king Ang Eng but rather a direct subject of the Siamese king, reporting to Bangkok not to Oudong. Baen was the first in the line of Siam-appointed governors of Battambang under direct Siamese supervision, the system that would persist for 112 years until the Franco–Siamese Treaty gave Northwestern Cambodia back to French Cambodia in 1907. Baen's authority included Northwestern Cambodia, roughly corresponding to modern Battambang, Siemreap, Banteay Meanchey and Oddar Meanchey provinces of Cambodia. 'Aphaiphubet' (Thai: อภัยภูเบศร์) would remain the title name of subsequent governors of Battambang or Phra Tabong, while the Siam-appointed governors of Siemreap (Siamrat Thai: เสียมราฐ) were given the Siamese title of Phraya Nuphaptraiphop (Thai: พระยานุภาพไตรภพ) as a subordinate town under jurisdiction of Battambang.

Partition of Cambodia between Baen and Ang Eng in 1794 demonstrated the pinnacle of Siamese influence over Cambodia. According to Thai chronicles and Thai historiography, King Ang Eng was pleased with this arrangement but in reality Ang Eng, who had been a young powerless puppet king for most of his life, was in no position to resist any Siamese demands. His Chief Minister Chauvea Tolaha Pok was essentially pro-Siamese. As the Siamese influence in Cambodia began to wane in the early nineteenth century, the Cambodian court would grow more resentful towards this perceived Siamese 'occupation' of Northwestern Cambodia, becoming one of many factors contributing to the Siamese–Vietnamese Wars of the mid-nineteenth century.

=== Governorship of Battambang ===
The Cambodian king Ang Eng, along with his children, his consorts, his followers and his entourage left Bangkok in January 1795 for Oudong the Cambodian royal capital. In a grand ceremony in Oudong, Baen surrender the Cambodian Kingdom Seal to King Ang Eng, leading the Oknhas to swear fealty to the king. Chaophraya Aphaiphubet Baen returned to Battambang in 1795 to assume his governorship. After ruling in person only for three years, King Ang Eng of Cambodia fell ill and died prematurely at the age of twenty-four in November 1797, spurring Cambodia into another succession dilemma.

Chaophraya Aphaiphubet Baen sent his son Ros to Bangkok to enter Siamese officialdom as a Mahatlek or royal page of the Siamese king Rama I, or the Siamese court would rather take Ros as hostage to ensure Baen's loyalty to Siam.

Premature death of King Ang Eng in 1797 left Chauvea Tolaha Pok with limitless power in Cambodia. Ang Eng had four sons; Ang Chan, Ang Sngoun, Ang Em and Ang Duong. His oldest son, Ang Chan, was only six years old at his death in 1797. None of these princes was old enough to assume the Cambodian throne, leaving Tolaha Pok as the Regent of Cambodia. For nine years, from 1797 to 1806, Cambodia was under the rule of Chauvea Tolaha Pok, who was pro-Siamese.

Nguyễn Phúc Ánh, who had earlier taken refuge in Bangkok, managed to eventually defeat the Tây Sơn, founding the Nguyen dynasty of Vietnam, ascending the Vietnamese throne as Emperor Gia Long in 1802. As Gia Long successfully united Vietnam and stabilized his authority, Vietnam began to present itself as a geopolitical rival of Siam. In 1805, Gia Long sent a diplomatic mission to Oudong, offering Vietnamese protection over Cambodia. Though Tolaha Pok received this Vietnamese mission with pomp, the mission was diplomatically dangerous in regard to the opinion of Siam. This Vietnamese visit prompted Tolaha Pok to bring the two eldest princes Ang Chan (sixteen years old) and Ang Sngoun (thirteen years old) from Oudong to Bangkok in December 1805 to urge the Siamese king Rama I to enthrone a new King of Cambodia. However, Pok fell ill and died at Bangkok in July 1806. King Rama I of Siam then enthroned Prince Ang Chan, eldest son of the deceased king Ang Eng, as the new king of Cambodia with the regnal name Somdet Phra Uthairacha or Preah Outey Reacheathireach in August 1806.

The new king Ang Chan of Cambodia returned to Oudong in late August 1806. Shortly after, in September 1806, Chaophraya Aphaiphubet Baen the Siam-appointed governor of Battambang personally brought his daughter Tep and his another son Ma from Battambang to Oudong. Baen presented his son Ma to enter the Cambodian officialdom, serving King Ang Eng, while also presenting his daughter Tep as a consort for King Ang Chan. Baen sent his two sons, Ros and Ma, to enter the service of both Bangkok and Oudong, balancing political opportunities. Baen stayed at Oudong for six months and returned to Battambang in March 1807.

Tep, daughter of Baen, would later became Neak Neang Tep, a consort of King Ang Chan. In December 1808, King Ang Chan traveled from Oudong to Bangkok to pay a visit to the Siamese king. On his journey, Ang Chan left his consort Tep, whose late pregnancy made her unsuitable for journey, at Battambang with her father Chaophraya Aphaiphubet Baen and her mother Neak Tey. At Battambang, Consort Tep gave birth to King Ang Chan's oldest child and oldest daughter, Princess Ang Ben or Ang Pen, in April 1809.

When the Cambodian King Ang Chan was enthroned by the Siamese king in 1806, Gia Long also sent a seal of investiture as "King of Cambodia" to Ang Chan in 1807. Early in his reign, Ang Chan found himself with little power, as his court was mostly dominated by the pro-Siamese ministers. Also due to his personal experiences with the Siamese court in Bangkok, Ang Chan became weary of Siamese influence in Cambodia and began to seek out for the Vietnamese Emperor Gia Long for Vietnamese assistance to counter or even topple Siamese domination of Cambodia.

King Rama I of Siam died in September 1809, succeeded by his son King Rama II. Chaophraya Aphaiphubet Baen the first Siam-appointed governor of Battambang also died in November 1809, about two months after the death of the Siamese king.

== Family ==
- Sons:
  - Phraya Aphaiphubet (Ros): 3rd governor of Battambang
  - Phra Ang Kaew (Ma): official of Cambodian court
  - Phra Narintharaborirak (Um): official of Battambang
  - Phra Yokrabat (Dom): official of Battambang
  - Luang Muang (Maw): official of Battambang
  - Luang Sachakhom: official of Muang Tanod, subordinate town of Battambang
  - Kong
  - Ket
- Daughters:
  - Mom Yu: married a member of Siamese royal family
  - Naek Thep (นักเทพ) : concubine of Ang Chan II; also mother of Princess Ang Baen
  - Mee (อำแดงมี)
  - Pok (อำแดงปก)
  - Paen (อำแดงแป้น)
  - Nuam (อำแดงนวม)
  - Mied (อำแดงเมียด)
  - Kaew (อำแดงแก้ว)

== Legacy ==
=== Cambodian dynastic conflict of 1811–1813 ===
At the death of Chaophraya Aphaiphubet Baen the first Siam-appointed governor of Battambang in November 1809, the new Siamese king Rama II appointed another pro-Siamese Cambodian official in service of Baen called Vibolreach Ben as the new governor of Battambang or Phra Tabong with the title of Phraya Aphaiphubet (Thai: พระยาอภัยภูเบศร์). Subsequent Siam-appointed governors of Battambang received the inferior rank of Phraya rather than Chaophraya. On the same occasion, Ros, son of Baen, who had been serving in Siamese officialdom, was appointed with the title Phra Wisetsunthon (Thai: พระวิเศษสุนทร) as the assistant-governor of Battambang. After the death of Aphaiphubet Baen, the Cambodian king Ang Chan expected Northwestern Cambodian to be returned to him. The new King of Siam instead appointed another governor of Battambang reporting directly to Bangkok, making these arrangements without consulting Ang Chan. Ang Chan became even more upset at Siam's continuing occupation of Northwestern Cambodia.

Ang Chan expressed his contempt for Siam by not attending to funeral of the deceased Siamese king Rama I, instead sending his younger brothers the Princes Ang Sngoun and Ang Em, along with other pro-Siamese Cambodian officials Preah Angkev Duong and Oknha Chakrey Kep. See through Chan's defiance, the Siamese king appointed Prince Ang Sngoun and Prince Ang Em, younger brothers of Ang Chan, as Uprayorach (Viceroy or Second King of Cambodia) and Ouparach (Deputy-viceroy or Third King of Cambodia), respectively, again without consulting the Cambodian king Ang Chan. These appointments by Siamese king turned younger brothers of Ang Chan into his pro-Siamese rivals. Meanwhile, the Burmese attacked Phuket in mid-1810. King Rama II sent the two Cambodian princes, who brought with them the Siamese request for conscription of Cambodian men to assist Siam in its war with Burma, back to Oudong. Ang Chan certainly did not comply with this request. Oknha Chakrey Kep or Pen, a former subordinate of Aphaiphubet Baen, who was known for his capture of Tolaha Ten in 1790, levied Cambodian men to support Siam per the request of the Siamese king. Ang Chan then had Oknha Chakrey executed in September 1810 for this treacherous act.

Eventually, Prince Ang Sngoun, younger brother of Ang Chan, rebelled against Chan in 1811. The Siamese king Rama sent forces from Bangkok and Battambang to attack Cambodia, destroying and burning down the two-century-old Cambodian royal capital of Oudong. Cambodian king Ang Chan fled to Saigon under protection of the Vietnamese ruler Gia Long, who sent Vietnamese armies to restore Ang Chan in Cambodia in 1813, for the Siamese were unable to occupy Cambodia long-term. Princes Ang Sngoun, Ang Em and Ang Duong, younger brothers of Ang Chan, all went to live in custody at Wang Chao Khamen or Cambodian Palace in Bangkok, in similar conditions as their father Ang Eng had been. Cambodia, during the events of 1811–1813, shifted from the period of Siamese influence to the period of Vietnamese domination. Ros, son of Aphaiphubet Baen, was eventually appointed as Phraya Aphaiphubet the governor of Battambang in 1814. Nguyễn Văn Thoại, the Vietnamese commissioner of Cambodia, instigated the Cambodian King Ang Chan to send troops to reclaim Battambang from Siam in 1815 but the armies were defeated by Ros the Siam-appointed Battambang governor.

=== Siamese–Vietnamese Wars ===
As Prince Ang Sngoun died in 1822, Princes Ang Em and Ang Duong became surviving pro-Siamese candidates for Cambodian throne. In 1827, Phraya Aphaiphubet Ros the Siam-appointed governor of Battambang and son of Chaophraya Aphaiphubet Baen was accused by his assistant-governor Chet of being an incompetent administrator, resulting in the sacking of Ros from his position by Bangkok court, who installed Chet as the new Phraya Aphaiphubet the governor of Battambang – a political defamation move by Chet.

During this period of Vietnamese domination over Cambodia, Consort Tep, a consort of King Ang Chan and daughter of Baen, lived in the Cambodian royal court at Phnom Penh with her daughter Princess Ang Pen. Her elder brother, Ma, who had been serving in Cambodian officialdom, eventually became Preah Angkev, a high princely-noble position. Consort Tep and her brother Ma, children of Chaophraya Aphaiphubet, represented the remaining pro-Siamese faction within Cambodian court. Even though King Ang Chan was pro-Vietnamese, he still sent some tributes to Bangkok just to keep Siamese aggression at bay. In 1829, Ang Chan assigned Preah Angkev Ma to go as an envoy to Bangkok. However, Consort Tep secretly wrote a letter, which Ma took with him to Bangkok. Her letter petitioned to the Siamese king Rama III, urging the Siamese to intervene in Cambodia. However, Siamese military were still exhausted with the Lao Rebellion of 1826–1828 so Siam did not respond in time. The Vietnamese became aware of this surviving pro-Siamese faction. Emperor Minh Mạng issued an order to arrest Preah Angkeo Ma in 1830, prompting Preah Angkeo Ma to flee to Battambang, where he was made governor of Svay Chek.

During the Siamese–Vietnamese Wars in the 1830s and the 1840s, Battambang served as the base for Siamese military operations in Cambodia. In November 1833, taking advantage of the Lê Văn Khôi Rebellion, King Rama III sent Siamese armies of 40,000 men under Chaophraya Bodindecha to invade and take control of Cambodia, prompting Ang Chan to flee to take refuge at Long Hồ. Princes Ang Em and Ang Duong, along with Preah Angkev Ma and Phraya Aphaiphubet Chet the governor of Battambang, also joined this Siamese expedition against Cambodia. However, the Vietnamese forces under Trương Minh Giảng from Saigon prevailed over the Siamese in the Battle of Vàm Nao in January 1834, prompting Chaophraya Bodindecha, the Cambodian princes and the rest of the Siamese to retreat. Vietnamese victory over the Siamese in Cambodia in 1834 allowed Vietnam to take full control of Cambodia after the death of King Ang Chan in 1835, by establishing the Trấn Tây Province over Cambodia. Ang Chan left no male heirs but four daughters. Even though Ang Pen, daughter of Consort Tep and granddaughter of Chaophraya Aphaiphubet, was the eldest daughter but she was passed over because of her strong connection with Siam. Ang Mey was chosen as the Queen Regnant of Cambodia under Vietnam's absolute rule, with Trương Minh Giảng as the Vietnamese commissioner of Cambodia.

Meanwhile, Phraya Aphaiphubet Chet the governor of Battambang died in 1834. King Rama III of Siam then appointed Cambodian prince Ang Em, Siam's candidate for Cambodian throne, as the new governor of Battambang in order for Ang Em to gather support from Cambodian people. Ros, who had earlier been sacked from his governor position in 1827, was reinstated as Phraya Palat the vice-governor of Battambang under Prince Ang Em. Chaophraya Bodindecha moved Battambang city from Baset to the present-day location on the Sangkae River in 1837. Lacking male candidates, Trương Minh Giảng sent a secret letter to Ang Em at Battambang, urging Ang Em to defect to Vietnamese side, promising to make him king. In December 1838, Prince Ang Em mutinied against Siam in Battambang, arresting Phraya Palat Ros the vice-governor and other Cambodian–Siamese officials, taking them going to Phnom Penh to join the Vietnamese. Phraya Palat Ros (son of Aphaiphubet Baen), along with the Prince Ang Em, were taken as war prisoners to Huế. This defection of Ang Em to Vietnam in 1838 threatened Siam's position in Battambang.

Trương Minh Giảng found Princess Ang Pen, granddaughter of Aphaiphubet Baen, communicating with her mother Tep and her uncle Ma at Battambang through secret letters. This incident caused the Vietnamese emperor Minh Mạng to dethrone Queen Ang Mey and exile her along with her princess sisters to Saigon, while Princess Ang Pen was put on criminal trial and was eventually executed by drowning in the Mekong at Long Hồ in 1840 for her communication with Siam. Execution of Princess Ang Pen and exile of other Cambodian princesses and Oknhas caused the Cambodians, who were dissatisfied with Vietnamese rule, to generally arose in 1840.

With Cambodia in general uprising against Vietnam, in November 1840, King Rama III sent Lao–Northern Khmer–Siamese multiethnic forces of 20,000 men under Bodindecha from Battambang to reclaim Cambodia. Death of the Vietnamese Emperor Minh Mạng in 1841 prompted the Vietnamese to retreat from Cambodia. Losing Cambodia, Trương Minh Giảng committed suicide. Chaophraya Bodindecha installed Ang Duong as Siam-backed candidate at Phnom Penh and sent Cambodian–Siamese forces under Chaophraya Yommarat Bunnak, joined by Preah Angkeo Ma (son of Chaophraya Aphaiphubet) and Ang Duong himself, to attack Southern Vietnam, leading to the Battle of Châu Đốc in April 1842, in which the Siamese suffered heavy defeat. Preah Angkeo Ma was killed in this battle along with nine other pro-Siamese Cambodian Oknhas and 1,200 soldiers.

== See also ==
- Cambodian–Thai border dispute
