= Vietnamese invasions of Cambodia =

The Vietnamese invasions of Cambodia were a period of Cambodian history, between 1813 and 1845, when the Kingdom of Cambodia was invaded by the Vietnamese Nguyễn dynasty three times, and a brief period from 1834 to 1841 when Cambodia was part of Tây Thành province in Vietnam, undertaken by Vietnamese emperors Gia Long (r. 1802–1819) and Minh Mạng (r. 1820–1841). The first invasion that took place in 1811–1813 put Cambodia as Vietnam's client kingdom. The second invasion in 1833–1834 made Cambodia a de facto Vietnamese province. Minh Mạng's harsh rule of the Cambodians finally ended after he died in early 1841, an event which coincided with a Cambodian rebellion, and both which triggered a Siamese intervention in 1842. The unsuccessful third invasion of 1845 resulted in the independence of Cambodia. Siam and Vietnam signed a peace treaty in 1847, allowing Cambodia to reassert its independence in 1848.

== Background ==
From the late 16th century onward, Cambodia had been subject to both Thai and Vietnamese aggressive and political intervention. After having been married to a Vietnamese princess in 1623, Cambodian king Chey Chettha II permitted Vietnamese to settle in a city called Prey Nokor which later became known as Saigon. In 1717, the Siamese attacked Cambodia. Twenty years later, a royal coup in Cambodian court ousted the ruling Satha II prompted a Vietnamese intervention led by lord Nguyễn Phúc Khoát (r. 1738–1765) to back the usurper king Prea Srey Thomea. However, they were defeated by Chettha V in 1750, who ceded the lower Mekong Delta to the Vietnamese in 1749. Under the new pro-Siamese king of Cambodia Ang Tong (r. 1747–1757), anti-Vietnamese violence escalated.

The Tayson rebellion erupted in central Vietnam in the 1770s and eventually brought down the Nguyen family's rule over Cochinchina. Nguyen remnants fled to the Mekong Delta to seek refuges, where they found support from Cambodian monarchs Ang Eng (r. 1779–1796) and Siamese Rama I. In early 1785, Siamese-Cambodian-Nguyen fleets marched forward Saigon, but they were routed by Tay Son leader Nguyễn Huệ at the Battle of Rạch Gầm-Xoài Mút. Taysons' liberal policies include religious and ethnic tolerance gained support from the Khmer, and some Cambodians joined the Taysons as oknya (officials). During the Vietnamese Civil War (1789–1802), Cambodia as a Siamese vassal sent at least 20,000 men and fought alongside Nguyen Anh's army against the Tay Son. When Nguyen Anh was crowned as emperor Gia Long (r. 1802–1819) of unified Kingdom of Vietnam, Cambodia's Ang Chan II agreed to become Gia Long's tributary monarch, and in 1806 Ang Chan received Gia Long's congratulation for his investiture, although Cambodia still hold a similar tributary relation with Siam.

== First invasion of 1811–1813 ==
In 1811, king Chan's pro-Siamese faction led by prince Ang Snguon and prince Ang Em launched a rebellion against him. Requested by Chan, Gia Long sent an army numbered 13,000 men commanded by Trương Tấn Bửu (1752–1827), invaded Cambodia, seized Oudong. In 1812 Ang Chan moved the Cambodian capital to Phnom Penh. After two years of fighting against Siamese and pro-Siamese Cambodian forces, Vietnamese forces took and acquired much of Cambodia by 1813. Ang Chan was restored back to power, but the kingdom was now put under Vietnamese viceroyship. Cambodia became a Vietnamese client kingdom.

== Vietnamese suzerainty over Cambodia (1813–1833) ==
First, Ang Chan had to convince his loyalty to Gia Long by arriving in a Vietnamese temple in the capital Phnom Penh every two months, had to wear Vietnamese attire and bow before a tablet bearing the Vietnamese emperor's name. Meanwhile, in the Siamese occupying-western Cambodia included Battambang, Ang Snguon and Ang Em declared as co-regents of Cambodia until 1813, then went to exile in Bangkok. Ang Snguon died in 1822. Encouraged by Gia Long, many ethnic Chams from central Vietnam migrated to Cambodia, whom most were Muslims. They erected Noor Al-Ihsan Mosque in Phnom Penh in 1813 to show their loyalty to the Cambodian Crown.

In 1817, tens of thousand Cambodian and Vietnamese workers were employed by Vietnamese officials to repair and extend the 40-miles Vĩnh Tế Canal that connects the Gulf of Thailand with the Mekong. In 1820–21 many Cambodian workers and ethnic Cambodian in southeast Cambodia, along with the Khmer Kroms joined the Ba Khnom rebellion led by a Khmer Buddhist monk against the Vietnamese rule. Ang Chan tried to suppress the rebellion with his Khmer–Vietnamese military but failed because its Khmer officials (okya) had deserted to the rebellion. The Vietnamese emperor Gia Long died in the same year. His successor, emperor Minh Mạng then sent a fresh army to Cambodia. His force defeated the rebellion at Kampong Cham and had the monk leader tried and executed in Saigon, including many other rebels.

The new ruler of Vietnam, Minh Mạng, was a conservative Confucian ruler. He shut down relations with France in 1824, contesting with Siamese ruler Rama III over Laos in 1828–31, and annexed many parts of the country in 1832. He took a different approach toward Cambodia, and also toward ethnic minorities in Southern Vietnam and the Central Highlands. That time Minh Mạng wanted to replace the Viceroy of Cambodia and Saigon, Lê Văn Duyệt, with officials loyal to him in order to consolidate his centralization efforts. In 1832, Duyệt died, the Vietnamese emperor removed the Viceroyalty of Saigon. Lê Văn Duyệt's adopted son Lê Văn Khôi revolted against Minh Mạng and the royal court. Hearing the news, Rama III of Siam, believed that he could scold Minh Mạng with assistance from pro-Siamese Chinese mercantile class in Saigon, sending a large army led by Bodin to attack the Vietnamese positions in Cambodia in early 1833 at the outbreak of the First Siamese–Vietnamese War. The Vietnamese quickly abandoned Phnom Penh and evacuated to Saigon along with king Ang Chan and the Cambodian court. The Siamese entered Phnom Penh with ease, installing Chan's brothers Ang Im and Ang Duang to the new Cambodian government but failed to gain popular support. Rama III promised to restore the Kingdom of Cambodia and punish the insolence of the Kingdom of Vietnam. However, poor communications between Siamese forces and navy caused the Siamese army to withdraw in early 1834 when Vietnamese navy broke the Siamese sea blockade and counterattacked.

== Vietnamese annexation of Cambodia (1834-1841) ==
The Vietnamese forces led by general Trương Minh Giảng reconquered Cambodia from Siamese forces in early 1834 and escorted the Cambodian king back to Phnom Penh. The Siamese army withdrew with two thousand Khmer and Chinese families from Phnom Penh. Along the westward routes to Siam, the Thai army also took massive local Khmer population and deported them to northeast Thailand.

By late 1834, Minh Mạng renamed Cambodia as Tây Thành province and incorporated it into his kingdom. Trương Minh Giảng was appointed as the governor of the province. Entire the Cambodian administration, tax resisters, military, foreign affairs, economy departments were transferred to Vietnamese control. Ang Chan died in early 1835. Minh Mạng appointed Queen Ang Mey as the puppet ruler, and the enthronement ceremony was celebrated following Vietnamese traditions.

=== Vietnamization of Cambodia ===
During this period, thousands of Vietnamese, Chams, Malays, and Chinese settlers were sent to Cambodia to subsidize the Vietnamization of Cambodia, and Vietnamese fashion such as the ao dai was forced upon the Cambodians. Around 5,000 to 6,000 Vietnamese troops were stationed in garrisons of the province. Wealthy Vietnamese landowners who have contributed more than 12 tons of rice and supplies for the troops in the province received government appointments as trophies. Vietnamese was enforced upon Cambodians as the official language. Native Cambodian troops were trained and recruited into indigenous tirailleurs.

=== Resistance and repression ===
From 1837 to 39, Cambodian anti-Vietnamese revolts led by Nong and Ey erupted in provinces near Phnom Penh. The governor Trương Minh Giảng enacted a campaign against Khmer dissents to put down these revolts. In Kandal province, Vietnamese troops failed to eliminate the Cambodian resistance movement. The rebels then retreated through jungles and mountains to Siamese-controlled territories.

== Siamese invasion (1841-1845) ==
Prince Ang Duong (Chan's brother exiled in Bangkok) led the opposition faction to resist the Vietnamese occupation.

Feeling anxiety about the Vietnamization progress of Cambodia, in June 1840 Minh Mang demoted Queen Mey and her sisters appointed them as low-rank officials of the province. Frustrated with the deposition of Queen Mey, a serious rebellion broke out in September. The rebellion was put down in early 1841. In August, Ang Mey and her sisters had been poisoned by Vietnamese secret police in an opera house, then deported to Saigon along with the royal regalia. Some members of the Cambodian ruling dynasty were imprisoned on Côn Sơn Island. The death of Minh Mang in 1841 changed the situation. Vietnamese offices and soldiers in Tây Thành Province were torn down by Cambodian guerillas while the governor Trương Minh Giảng had been calling back by the newly crowned emperor Thieu Tri to deal with internal rebellions. After a failed attempt to bring Prince Im to Cambodian throne in late 1841, Trương Minh Giảng committed suicide.

Thai forces numbering 35,000 troops Took advantage, and invaded Cambodia, occupying Phnom Penh, and asserted their rule over the abandoned Vietnamese province. Bodin ordered to deport and massacre all Vietnamese in Cambodia. However, Thai rule was short-lived, as they evacuated Phnom Penh in early 1844 and withdrew to Udong.

== Third invasion and end of Dai Nam rule (1845-1847) ==
The Vietnamese launched a counterattack on Phnom Penh in 1845, then attacked Thai stronghold at Udong, which led to immediate peace negotiations. After four years of foreign invasions, chaos, and rebellions, Cambodia was almost exhausted. Vietnamese rules over Cambodia turned into attrition. A peace agreement between Vietnam and Siam was reached in June 1847. The Vietnamese court released all royal members of the Cambodian ruling dynasty, transferring the administration to the new independent Cambodian monarchy of king Ang Duong and withdrew their army from Cambodia, ending the Tây Thành Province and 36 years of Vietnamese invasions and occupations.

== Notes ==
- Chandler, David (2018) [1986]. A History of Cambodia. Taylor & Francis. ISBN 978-0-429-97514-1.
- Corfield, Justin J. (2009). The History of Cambodia. ABC-CLIO. ISBN 978-0-31335-723-7.
- Kiernan, Ben (2008), "Serial colonialism and genocide in nineteenth-century Cambodia", in Moses, A. Dirk (ed.), Empire, Colony, Genocide: Conquest, Occupation, and Subaltern Resistance in World History, Berghahn Books, pp. 205–228, ISBN 978-1-78238-214-0
- ——— (2019) [2017]. Việt Nam: a history from earliest time to the present. Oxford University Press. ISBN 978-0-19005-379-6.
- Osborne, Milton E. (2008). Phnom Penh: A Cultural and Literary History. Signal Books. ISBN 978-1-90495-540-5.
