= Tây Thành province =

Former Vietnamese province (1834–1841/1847)

Tây Thành Province Trấn Tây Thành (鎮西城) (Vietnamese) ត្រានតាយថាញ់ (Khmer)
- Province of Nguyễn Vietnam
- 1834–1847
- Seal of Protector General of Trấn Tây Thành

- Location of Tây Thành province (dark green) under the Nguyen Dynasty (light green).
- Map of Tây Thành province in 1838 under Minh Mạng era (based on the 1860 map)
- Capital: Nam Vang
- Population
  - 1840: 970,516
- Government
  - Type: Monarchy under Vietnamese administration
- Protector-General
  - 1834–1841: Trương Minh Giảng
- Monarch of Cambodia
  - 1835–1846: Ang Mey
- Historical era: New Imperialism
  - Vietnamese invasions of Cambodia: 1834
  - Cambodian rebellion: 1840
  - Peace treaty between Siam and Vietnam: 1847
Preceded by	Succeeded by
Kingdom of Cambodia	Kingdom of Cambodia
- Today part of: Cambodia

Tây Thành (lit. 'Western Fortress') was formerly the 32nd province of Nguyễn Vietnam, encompassing what is now modern-day Cambodia. Its capital was the Cambodian capital of Phnom Penh (known to the Vietnamese as "Nam Vang"). It was a special province with a dual system, consisting of Cambodian monarchs who reigned as puppet rulers while a Vietnamese governor resided in Phnom Penh. The province was finally abolished in 1847 after peace talks between Siam and Vietnam concluded dual-suzerainty over Cambodia.

== Context ==
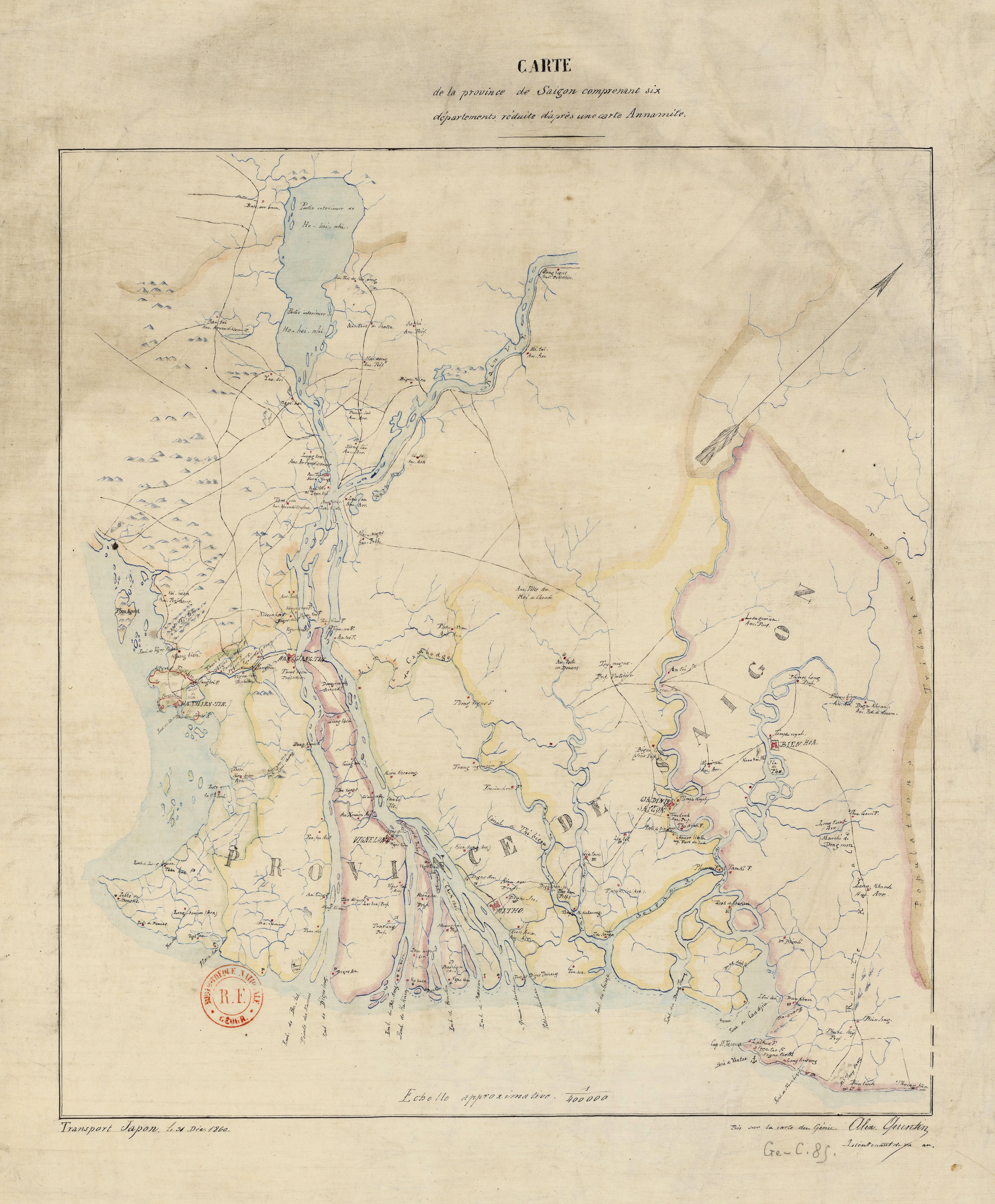
Cambodia and Southern Vietnam in 1860 (the names of the Cambodian districts as named by the Nguyễn dynasty, transliterated from French): Nam Thái (An-tai F), Phù Nam (Phou-Nam), Nam Ninh (Nam-nigne), Lư An (Lou-an), La Kết (La-Kiet), Tầm Vu (Tam-vou), Nam Vang (Nora-Vang), Kỳ Tô (Ki-to), Long Tôn (Long-ton), Ngọc Bi (Ngoc-bai), Ý Dĩ (Yao-dzi), Hải Tây (Hai-tai), Hải Đông (Hai-dong), Bình Xiêm (Bigne-Xien), Phúc Lai (Pheuoc-laḯ), Chấn Tài (Kieng-tai), Biển Hồ (Ho-hai-nhi), Bát Tầm Bang (Bato-an boun).

In 1807, after Emperor Gia Long ascended to the throne, Emperor Chân Lạp Ang Chan II (Nak Ong Chan, Nặc Chăn) requested to submit to the court of Huế instead of the Siamese court as before.

Emperor Minh Mạng sent Trương Minh Giảng, Phan Văn Thúy with troops to quell the rebellion of Lê Văn Khôi. Taking advantage of the high walls and deep moats, Lê Văn Khôi's forces effectively held out. The imperial army besieged the fortress for two years before finally breaking through in September 1835. Lê Văn Khôi had died from illness before that, and his son and remaining followers were captured and executed.

Meanwhile, the Siamese forces attacked An Giang province (in December 1833), then advanced to engage in battle at Củ Hủ. In this battle, the Nguyễn court's army won and launched a counterattack to reclaim the Châu Đốc post in An Giang province, then the Hà Tiên fortress, and together with the forces of pro-Vietnamese Cambodian, they moved upstream on the Mekong River to retake the Nam Vang citadel. The Siamese army was defeated and forced to withdraw from Cambodia; the imperial court in Huế then restored Ang Chan II to the throne.

After driving out the Siamese forces, Trương Minh Giảng and Lê Đại Cương established a post at Đại Nam near Nam Vang to protect Chân Lạp. The governance within Chân Lạp was entirely arranged by Vietnamese officials, while the Chân Lạp court's ministers only took on minor tasks.

At the end of 1834, the king of Chenla, Ang Chan II, died without a son, and the governance within the country fell to several local officials, including Trà Long (Chakrey Long) and La Kiên, who were originally from Chân Lạp but had been granted official titles by the imperial court in Huế.

In 1835, Trương Minh Giảng petitioned the emperor to appoint the daughter of Nặc Ông Chân, Ang Mey (Ngọc Vân), as a princess, called Chân Lạp Princess. In reality, Ngọc Vân had no real power.

In 1836, Emperor Minh Mạng changed the name of Chân Lạp to Trấn Tây and officially annexed it into Đại Nam. The northwestern border of Trấn Tây extended to the Tonlé Sap lake.

== The Nguyễn Dynasty's Direct Rule ==
=== Administrative Management ===
Trấn Tây Thành was divided into 33 provinces and 2 districts:

The Huế court abolished the native official titles of Chân Lạp and applied the official system of the Nguyễn Dynasty. Lê Đại Cương (later replaced by Dương Văn Phong) was appointed as the Chief Counselor, and a military commander, four main and deputy military officers were appointed. Various other positions were established, including hiệp tán, đề đốc, lang trung, viên ngoại lang, giáo thụ, and huấn đạo. In strategic areas, the positions of tuyên phủ and an phủ were also created for defense.

In 1840, the emperor appointed Lê Văn Đức as the imperial envoy, with Doãn Uẩn as his deputy, and together with Trương Minh Giảng, they were tasked with overseeing all matters in Trấn Tây Thành, inspecting trade activities, measuring land, reassessing the poll tax, and taxes on river-based trading boats.

Emperor Minh Mạng ordered a census of the population in Chân Lạp, which had just been annexed into the territory of Đại Nam. The population was recorded at 970,516 people, while the land area amounted to 4,036,892 acres.

== Map of Vietnamize Names in Cambodia ==
The position of the provinces and districts of Trấn Tây is based on the old map Carte de la province de Saigon from 1860.

=== Relations with the Natives ===
When the Nguyễn Dynasty conquered Nam Vang and appointed Ang Chan II as the king of Chenla, his siblings Ang Snguon, Ang Em, and Ang Duong fled the city and sought refuge with the Siamese forces at Vọng Các. The Siamese court took advantage of this situation and attempted to bring them back to Chenla to contest the throne with Ang Chan, aiming to restore Siam's influence over the region.

Meanwhile, in Trấn Tây, the Nguyễn Dynasty conferred titles on the three daughters of Ang Chan II:

- Ang Pen (Ngọc Biện 玉卞, Brhat Anak Angga Ang Baen) (1809-1840) was made the military commander of Lư An;
- Ang Mey (Ngọc Vân 玉雲, Samdach Brhat Anak Angga Mei Khieu) (1815-1874?) was appointed Chân Lạp Princess, succeeding her father's throne;
- Ang Snguon (Ngọc Nguyên 玉源) (1829-1875) was made the military commander of Tạp Ninh;
- Ang Pou (Ngọc Thu 玉秋, Samdach Brhat Maha Uparajini Puyani) (1822-1878) was made the military commander of Thâu Trung.

In 1839, Ang Em and Ang Duong brought 9,000 Khmer people along with 70 boats from Battambang (Siamese-occupied territory) to Trấn Tây (the region governed by Đại Nam), intending to ask the Nguyễn Dynasty court to allow them to succeed Ang Chan as king. However, they were captured by Trương Minh Giảng. The court ordered that Ang Em be brought to Gia Định for interrogation, then sent to Huế for imprisonment.

In 1840, Trà Long (Chakrey Long), Nhân Vu (Yumreach Hu), and La Kiên came to Huế to celebrate the emperor's birthday. However, they were charged by the emperor, imprisoned, and exiled to Northern Vietnam. Meanwhile, in Trấn Tây, the Chief Counselor Dương Văn Phong charged Ngọc Biện (Ang Baen), the sister of Princess Ngọc Vân, with treason for allegedly attempting to escape to Siam, and she was sentenced to death. Later, Trương Minh Giảng arrested Ngọc Vân and her two sisters, Ngọc Thu and Ngọc Nguyên, and placed them under house arrest in Gia Định. Many Vietnamese officials who came to Trấn Tây engaged in illegal activities, abusing their power and exploiting the local population.

The king said: “Currently, we are in the midst of military campaigns, so it is not appropriate to summon for investigations. However, I have already given instructions for each person and each matter. If we leave these unresolved, those who have committed offenses will not be deterred. Therefore, Vũ Hành and Lê Bá Hùng are to be immediately relieved of their positions, detained, and handed over to Doãn Uẩn and Cao Hữu Dực for thorough and strict investigation.” These two officials were later sent to Trấn Tây to serve as soldiers.

With an arrogant attitude and disdain for the officials of Chân Lạp, this caused widespread discontent among the people, making the administration of Trấn Tây increasingly difficult. The people of Chân Lạp found a reason to rebel, attacking and causing turmoil everywhere, opposing the Việtization policies of the Huế court. Ang Chan’s younger brother, Ang Duong, took advantage of this situation to rise in rebellion, and with support from Siam, intervened in the internal affairs of Chân Lạp. Consequently, the imperial forces in Trấn Tây had to constantly fight to suppress the uprisings, which drained their military resources.

In 1840, several thousand Siamese troops marched into U Đông (Oudong). King Minh Mạng sent generals Phạm Văn Điển and Nguyễn Tiến Lâm with forces to confront them, but they were unable to break the siege.

It was not until the reign of Emperor Thiệu Trị that it was discovered that Ngọc Biện had been wrongfully convicted. In addition, at the end of Minh Mạng's reign (1840), Lê Quang Huyên, the governor of Hà Tiên, intercepted a letter from the people of Chân Lạp complaining about the oppression they suffered under Trấn Tây General Trương Minh Giảng. The letter also mentioned the harassment by tax collectors and the unjust demands, including Trương Minh Giảng's attempt to marry Princess Ngọc Vân (Ang Mey). These grievances added to the unrest in the region.

Quyền lĩnh Tuần phủ Hà Tiên Lê Quang Huyên reported that the spies had found a letter from the Chân Lạp people, which accused Trấn Tây Tướng quân Trương Minh Giảng and the tax collectors of exploiting the locals by demanding gold. The letter, which was written in inappropriate language, was translated into Chinese and submitted to the court.

The Quảng Biên administration reported that the rice fields were ripening, and that the bandits were still spreading trouble. However, in the Khai Biên region, no bandits had gathered. Additional troops had been sent to work with Lê Quang Huyên, the Defense Supervisor Phạm Văn Sỹ, and other forces to track down and eliminate the remaining rebels, setting up posts in vulnerable areas to prevent foreign threats.

The king issued an edict to the Cơ mật viện, saying: "The Hà Tiên province sent the letter from the Chân Lạp people. In the letter, they said: ‘The general wants to take the princess as his wife, but they do not agree. They have also used Dương Quan Thảo as a spy to keep an eye on us, but he is not trustworthy. They are supposed to follow the orders, but they have been oppressed for a long time by the general.’ Clearly, they have long resented the general’s actions. As for the issue of buying gold, Lê Quang Huyên in An Giang is from a different jurisdiction, and there is no reason for him to meddle. I order an immediate investigation to identify anyone involved in such corrupt practices, and they must be punished severely as a deterrent to others. As for the bandits, they are generally ignorant and will not respond to reason, so we must conduct a thorough campaign to put fear into them. As for the Khai Biên route, as reported, there has been no issue so far. If we rush to establish posts, there will be difficulties in gathering troops, transporting supplies, and maintaining the roads. It would be better to first focus on Quảng Biên, strengthen the morale of the soldiers, and then proceed to Khai Biên, gathering the people there and setting up defenses to secure the border, which will ensure the stability of the region."

== Retreat from Tây Thành Province ==
The occupation of Tây Thành Province and the policies of governance that caused discontent among the people of Chenla by the Hue court became a burden on the country, depleting both soldiers and resources.

In the first year of Emperor Thiệu Trị's reign (1841), during the summer, in April, the court decided to abandon the defensive posts in Quảng Biên district and Khai Biên county.

The Emperor sat in the Văn Minh Hall and discussed the issue of the border at Hà Tiên. Trương Đăng Quế presented the following: "Currently, the fortification of Tây Thành Province has withdrawn its troops, leaving Hà Tiên in a vulnerable and isolated position. It may not be possible to prevent future problems. Quảng Biên District, with its fertile lands, is the key defense for Hà Tiên. I believe it should not be abandoned. However, the most important task at present is to avoid further military conflict. Maintaining Quảng Biên will be a significant challenge, so I suggest postponing a decision until later."

The Emperor responded: "The bandits have caused trouble, and we have not been able to suppress them for a long time. Now, with multiple military units encircling them, the bandits will inevitably flee to other areas, and this land will be left empty. Capturing it would be of no real value. Moreover, the best military strategy is to win the people's hearts, not rely on force. We should announce to them the benefits of our kindness, so that their followers may surrender willingly, and there will be no need to continue exterminating the bandits."

The court then discussed the situation at Tây Thành Province: The Nguyễn army had been stationed at Tây Thành for a long time, besieged by the Siamese and Chenla forces. Nặc Ong Yểm and Ngọc Vân were sent back to their homeland to persuade the people of Chenla, but no results were achieved. The officials at Tây Thành requested permission to retreat to An Giang. The officials in the court (Tạ Quang Cự, Trương Đăng Quế, etc.) also agreed: "It would be better to temporarily withdraw the troops to An Giang, to secure the fundamental borders of our territory. We should wait for a better opportunity and act when the time is right. However, during the retreat, the Kinh lược officers and commanders must remain calm, distribute officials and troops to various locations, and find land for Yểm, Ngọc Vân, Ngọc Thu, Ngọc Nguyên as well as the Kinh and Thổ people to settle peacefully. As for the war elephants, if they cannot be brought back, they should be slaughtered to feed the soldiers."

The court then instructed the high-ranking ministers to discuss the matter at Tây Thành in more detail. Outside the city, the forces were blocked by the enemy, and the soldiers were only able to stay inside the city and surrounding fortifications to defend. The court frequently urged them to go out and fight, but the officials kept citing various excuses and showing reluctance. Several times, royal edicts were issued to reprimand them, but Trương Minh Giảng only presented petitions of apology. The high ministers from the Cơ mật cabinet were instructed to write to the local officials, in essence, asking: "Should we keep holding the city, which may be safe for now, or should we wait for Yểm to return and attempt to persuade the Thổ people? Or should we withdraw the troops to hold An Giang and focus on eliminating the enemies from both An Giang and Hà Tiên, leaving the remaining enemies for later?"

At this point, officials including Pham Van Dien, Truong Minh Giang, Nguyen Cong Tru, Doan Van Sach, Nguyen Cong Nhan, and Cao Huu Duc submitted a confidential report stating: "Previously, we had requested to release Yerm in the hope that it would be an opportunity for him to persuade the local ethnic minorities. However, since Yerm was released, he has been unable to establish his own authority and has relied entirely on us. If we do not use large-scale military forces, this matter will never be resolved. Moreover, the regular troops have been exhausted for a long time, and the number of sick soldiers increases daily. Holding the city without any substantial results only causes further harm, with no benefits. We respectfully propose withdrawing all the troops to An Giang Province, allowing the soldiers to rest and the people of Southern Vietnam to recover."

This memorial was sent down for the civil and military officials to discuss. The officials Tạ Quang Cự, Nguyễn Văn Trọng, Nguyễn Tăng Minh, Võ Xuân Cẩn, Trương Đăng Quế, Lê Đăng Doanh, Hà Duy Phiên, Nguyễn Trung Mậu, Phan Bá Đạt, Doãn Uẩn, and Phan Thanh Giản all said: "Now, as autumn approaches, the rivers are swollen, the roads are blocked. If we use the army, the supplies will not continue, and if we stay and defend, it will only be a useless effort with no tangible result. We’ve thought over it many times, and we don't have any better solution. It would be better to temporarily withdraw the army to An Giang, to strengthen our core defenses. Then, we can act later when the opportunity arises. However, when withdrawing the army, the regional leaders and generals should remain calm, deploy soldiers to guard key areas, and find land for Yểm, Ngọc Vân, Ngọc Thu, Ngọc Nguyên, along with the Kinh and Thổ people, so they can settle peacefully. As for the elephants, if they can’t be brought back, they should be slaughtered to feast the troops."

The Emperor agreed, stating that since the conflict in Trấn Tây began, the six provinces of Southern Vietnam had suffered from both military and civilian fatigue, and the court had also been burdened with costs that were difficult to calculate. He was tired of warfare, and moreover, next year there would be a royal tour to the North. It would be best to temporarily set aside the situation in Trấn Tây and not think about it for now, as it would not harm anything. The Emperor then decreed: "Given the current situation, it must be done this way. Let’s act according to the advice given. Those officials from Kinh Lược, the Generals, the Tán Lý, and the Hiệp Lý who have not achieved any results should be handed over to the Ministry of Justice to face appropriate punishment for each individual."

He also issued an additional order to all the officials in the six provinces of Southern Vietnam: "The court's decision here is to allow the people to rest, as I cannot bear to make the people suffer over land, which is not the most valuable, when the people themselves are the most precious. You must follow my instructions with all your heart: call back any displaced villagers, settle abandoned fields, provide relief to the hungry, assist those in poverty, stop thefts and robberies, and work to unite the people. Once peace is established inside, we will not need to use military force to subdue the enemy outside, as they will have no choice but to surrender."

In September of 1841, Emperor Thiệu Trị agreed and ordered the Đại Nam army to withdraw and hold the province of An Giang.

Upon hearing the news of Giảng's death, the Emperor remarked: “Giảng took on a heavy responsibility, but the method of governing the people and fighting the enemies was not proper, which led to the indigenous people rising in rebellion, causing the court to send troops for pacification, a task that has lasted for a long time without success. The responsibility was assigned to the Ministry to conduct a strict investigation of his actions. Unexpectedly, the main army had just returned, and he fell ill and died. I believe Giảng's achievements in the previous year, as the Deputy Director of Military Affairs, made the enemies in Biên Hòa and Vĩnh Long tremble with fear, and he even defeated the Siamese forces in Thuận Cảng. His merits are clear, and they are so significant that they cannot be erased, even if carved on stone tablets. I order the restoration of his position as the Trấn Tây General, to clearly delineate his faults, but I will grant him an honorary title of Đại học sĩ and provide a pension. Furthermore, I will reward him with 5 rolls of Chinese brocade, 5 rolls of colored silk, 20 sheets of fine silk, 30 sheets of cotton cloth, and 1,000 quan in cash, and release him from further investigation. I will also withdraw the salary for the position of seventh-rank officer previously held by his son, Trương Minh Thi."

"I grant that Phạm Văn Điển, Nguyễn Công Trứ, Đoàn Văn Sách, Nguyễn Công Nhàn, and Cao Hữu Dực will retain their positions as commanders of the military stationed in An Giang, to jointly handle the affairs at hand. As for the positions related to military affairs, including the roles of Kinh Lược, Deputy Military Advisor, Military Director, and Assistant Military Advisor in Tây Thành Province, these positions will be abolished and their duties revoked. The seals of the military office, the flags, the dragon flags, and the seals for the two armies and their supplies will be returned to the Ministry. The officers from the An Biên administrative office will be reassigned to vacant posts in the six provinces of Southern Vietnam; any remaining positions will be returned to the capital, and replacements will be made for any vacancies".

Taking advantage of the unresolved situation in Chenla, the King of Siam installed Ang Duong as the King of Cambodia. The conflict continued as Vietnamese and Siamese forces fought from 1841 to 1845. In 1845, the Hue court and Bangkok reached a settlement, agreeing to jointly protect the Cambodia region and accept tribute from Ang Duong.

== Districts ==
Districts of Trấn Tây Thành
Quốc ngữ	Chữ Hán	Corresponding place today
Nam Vang	南榮	Phnom Penh
Kỳ Tô/Thời Tô (Thời Thâu)	其蘇/辰蘇 (辰萩)	Srey Santhor, province of Kandal
Tầm Đôn (Tầm Giun)	尋敦 (尋惇)	Border regions of Gia Định, perhaps Romdoul, province of Svay Rieng
Tuy Lạp (Xui Rạp, Lôi Lạp)	綏臘	Border regions of Gia Định, perhaps Svay Rieng (Note: Upstream of Vàm Cỏ river, which is called Soai Rạp river.)
Ba Nam (Ba Cầu Nam)	巴南 (巴求南)	Peam Ro, Peam Mean Chey, province of Prey Veng
Ba Lai (Ba Lầy)	巴來 (巴淶)	Baray, province of Kampong Thom
Bình Xiêm (Bông Xiêm)	平暹 (凡暹)	Kampong Siem, province of Kampong Cham
Kha Bát (Lợi Ỷ Bát)	哥捌 (利椅捌)	Prey Kabbas, province of Takeo
Lô Viên (Lô Yêm, Lư An)	爐圓 (盧淹, 閭安)	Western Phnom Penh, Lvea Aem, province of Kandal
Hải Đông (Bông Xui)	海東 (楓吹)	Kampong Svay, province of Kampong Thom
Kim Trường	金長	Border of An Giang
Thâu Trung (Phủ Trung)	輸忠 (中府)	
Ca Âu (Ca Khu)	歌謳 (歌塸)	
Vọng Vân (Trung Hà)	望雲 (中河)	
Hà Bình	河平	
Trưng Lai (Trưng Lệ)	徵來 (征例)	
Sơn Phủ	山甫	
Sơn Bốc	山卜	Sambour
Tầm Vu (Mạt Tầm Vu)	尋於 (末尋於)	Southwestern Phnom Penh, province of Kampong Speu
Khai Biên	開邊	The coastal regions of Koh Kong
Hải Tây (Phủ Lật)	海西 (撫栗)	Pursat
Kha Lâm (Ca Rừng)	哥林 (柯棱)	The border of Gia Định
Thê Lạp	梯笠	
Cẩm Bài	錦牌	
Lô Việt	爐越	Lovek, tỉnh Kampong Chhnang
Long Tôn	龍樽	Northern Phnom Penh
Quảng Biên	廣邊	Kampot
Hóa Di (Ba Di)	化夷 (巴夷)	
Chân Tài (Chân Lệ)	真才 (真例)	Northeastern Phnom Penh near Kampong Cham
Ý Dĩ (Phủ Phủ)	薏苡	Northern Kampong Chhnang
Chân Thành (Chân Thiêm)	真誠 (真占)	Hà Dương District, An Giang province
Mật Luật (Ngọc Luật)	密律 (玉律)	Tây Xuyên District, An Giang province
Ô Môn	烏門	Phong Phú District, An Giang province
Cẩn Chế District	芹制	Cần Ché
Cẩn Đô District	芹漇	Kanhchor (Prek Chamlak); Southern Cần Ché
