= Cambodian conflict (1812–1813) =

Cambodian uprising against Vietnamese rule

Cambodian Conflict (1812–1813)
- Part of Siamese–Vietnamese Wars and Vietnamese invasions of Cambodia
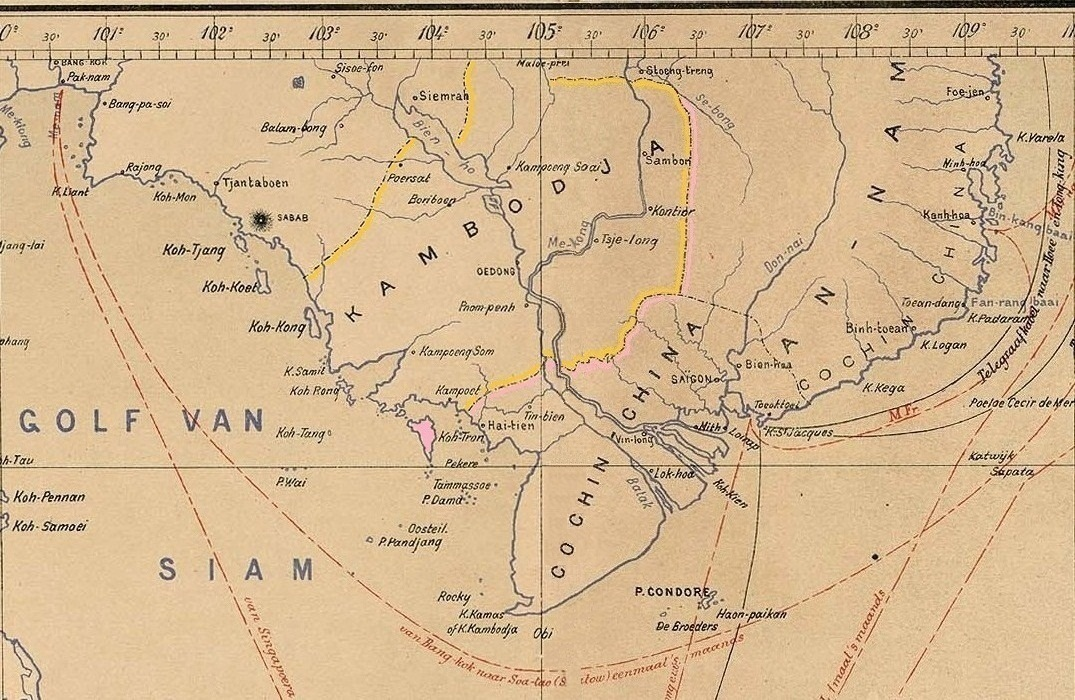
Date	15 January 1812–14 May 1813
Location	Cambodia
Result	See aftermath: Cambodian-Vietnamese Victory; Vietnamese forces restore Ang Chan to the Cambodian throne

Belligerents
Rattanakosin Kingdom (Siam)	Kingdom of Cambodia; Nguyễn dynasty

Commanders and leaders
Chao Phraya Yommarach (Noi)	King Ang Chan II (Note: In Vietnamese record, he was called Nặc Chăn (匿禛).); Lê Văn Duyệt (Note: In Thai record, he was called Ong Ta Kun (Thai: องต๋ากุน).); Ngô Nhân Tịnh; Nguyễn Văn Thoại; Nguyễn Văn Tồn

Units involved
Siamese Army	Cambodian Army; Vietnamese Army

Strength
15,000 troops	13,000 troops

Casualties and losses
Unknown	Unknown

The Cambodian Conflict of 1812–1813 was a dynastic conflict between the incumbent King Ang Chan II of Cambodia, who had support from the Vietnamese Nguyen dynasty under Emperor Gia Long, and his younger brother Prince Ang Sngoun, who had support from Siam under King Rama II of the Rattanakosin Kingdom, resulting in both the Siamese and the Vietnamese marching armies into Cambodia.

Previously, the young King Ang Eng of Cambodia was taken to Bangkok due to upheaval in Cambodia in 1782, where he lived as a hostage under Siam. King Rama I of Siam, through his agent the pro-Siamese Cambodian minister Chaophraya Aphaiphubet Baen, exerted Siamese domination over Cambodia in 1790. The Siamese king Rama sent Ang Eng out to rule Cambodia in person under Siamese domination in 1794 but also annexed Northwestern Cambodia, including Battambang and Siemreap, to be under Aphaiphubet as the first Siam-appointed governor of Battambang under Siam's direct rule. The Cambodian king Ang Eng died in 1797, leaving four young sons Ang Chan, Ang Sngoun, (Note: In Vietnamese record, he was called Nặc Nguyên (匿原).) Ang Em (Note: In Vietnamese record, he was called Nặc Yêm (匿俺).) and Ang Duong. (Note: In Vietnamese record, he was called Nặc Đôn (匿𧑒).) King Rama I sent Ang Chan to rule as King of Cambodia under Siamese auspices in 1806. However, Ang Chan had negative experiences with the Siamese court and sought out for Emperor Gia Long of Vietnam to counter Siamese influences.

When King Rama I of Siam died in 1809, Ang Chan defied Siamese domination by refusing to attend the funeral of the Siamese king at Bangkok. The new Siamese king, Rama II, appointed Ang Sngoun, younger brother of Ang Chan, to the position of Viceroy of Cambodia without consulting Ang Chan, turning Ang Sngoun into a pro-Siamese rival of Ang Chan, who also became pro-Vietnamese as the Cambodian royal court polarized into Siam-aligned and Vietnam-aligned factions. Ang Chan ordered executions of two pro-Siamese Cambodian ministers in September 1810, prompting the Siamese king to send troops to the Siam-controlled Battambang in preparation to attack Cambodia. Ang Chan requested assistance from the Vietnamese Emperor Gia Long, who sent Nguyễn Văn Nhơn the governor of Saigon to bring forces to Longvek to guard Ang Chan. The standoff lasted four months until Nguyễn Văn Nhơn pulled off his troops back but the Siamese remained at Battambang.

Ang Sngoun rebelled at Pursat against Ang Chan in January 1812. King Rama II of Siam sent Chaophraya Yommaraj Noi to bring Cambodian–Siamese forces of 5,000 from Battambang into Cambodia to support Ang Sngoun in April 1812, prompting King Ang Chan to flee to Saigon, seeking refuge under protection of the Vietnamese. In the same time, Siam also sent a diplomatic mission to the Vietnamese Emperor Gia Long at Huế explaining the necessity of Siamese intervention in Cambodia – the notion that Gia Long did not agree. Siamese commander Yommaraj Noi occupied Oudong the Cambodian royal capital until early 1813 when he decided to retreat as he was not prepared for a long-term occupation of Cambodia. Before leaving, the Siamese destroyed and burnt down Oudong, which had been the royal capital of Cambodia for two centuries. The Cambodian princes Ang Sngoun, Ang Em and Ang Duong, younger brothers of Ang Chan, were all taken to Bangkok to live at Wang Chao Khamen or Cambodian palace quarters in custody. Gia Long had Lê Văn Duyệt the governor of Saigon parade King Ang Chan back to Cambodia in a grand showcase of Vietnamese military forces in May 1813, restoring Ang Chan to the Cambodian throne.

During this Cambodian dynastic conflict, Siam and Vietnam avoided direct confrontation. Gia Long, who had earlier spent some years in political refuge in Bangkok, was not poised to go against his former ally but Vietnam was becoming Siam's geopolitical opponent over domination of Cambodia. Siam also could not afford to engage in a full-scale war with Vietnam due to the ever-existing Burmese threat from the west. This new generation of Cambodian princely conflict developed simultaneously with the renewed Siamese–Vietnamese rivalry. King Ang Chan of Cambodia, however, preferred Vietnam as his hegemon. The events of 1812–1813 shifted Cambodia from the period of Siamese influence to the period of Vietnamese domination as Siam lost control over Cambodia. Vietnamese influence on Cambodia would be externally unchallenged for two decades until Siam invaded Cambodia again in 1833.

== Background ==
=== Cambodian dynastic conflicts ===
In 1769, King Taksin of Thonburi sent messages to King Ang Ton of Cambodia, urging him to send tributes to Siam and submit. King Ang Ton refused. In 1771, King Taksin ordered Phraya Yommaraj (later King Rama I) to lead troops of 10,000 men to invade Cambodia through Battambang, Siemreap and Pursat to attack Oudong and to bring the pro-Siamese Prince Ang Non to the Cambodian throne. King Taksin himself with the general Chen Lian (陳聯) led the fleet to attack Hà Tiên, leading to the Siamese-Vietnamese War (1771–1773). King Ang Ton fled to Saigon under the protection of the Nguyen Lord Nguyễn Phúc Thuần. Nguyễn Phúc Thuần sent the general Nguyễn Cửu Đàm to aid against the Siamese invasions. The Siamese were repelled with Prince Ang Non stayed behind at Kampot. Also in 1771, the Tây Sơn Rebellion arose against the rule of Nguyen Lords. King Ang Ton returned to Cambodia and negotiated with Ang Non. Ang Ton abdicated the Cambodian throne in 1775 in favor of Ang Non who became the new King of Cambodia. However, Ang Ton died in 1777, leaving Ang Non in full power in Cambodia. Cambodian nobles, led by Chauvea Tolaha Mou and his brother Oknha Decho Ten, were dissatisfied with King Ang Non's pro-Siamese stance. Tolaha Mou sought support from Nguyễn Phúc Ánh who had been fighting against the Tây Sơn from Saigon. Nguyễn Phúc Ánh sent Vietnamese army to support Tolaha Mou, who arrested and murdered King Ang Non in 1779. Tolaha Mou placed a four-year-old son of Ang Ton named Ang Eng as the new king of Cambodia with himself as the regent. King Taksin, upon learning about the Cambodian regicide, was furious at Oknha Yomreach Baen who was the protector of King Ang Non. Taksin ordered Yomreach Baen arrested and imprisoned at Thonburi but Chaophraya Chakri secured his pardon and release.

=== Cambodia under Siamese domination ===
In 1782, Chaophraya Chakri became King Rama I of the Chakri dynasty. Oknha Yomreach Baen and Oknha Kralahom Pok successfully staged a coup and killed Tolaha Mou in 1782. However, the ensuing confusion and civil war in Cambodia prompted Yomreach Baen and Kralahom Pok to bring the young king Ang Eng and his elder sisters Princess Ang E and Ang Pen to Bangkok. King Rama I took care of King Ang Eng as his adopted son, while Princesses Ang E and Ang Pen became consorts of Prince Surasinghanat. In Cambodia, Decho Ten, the younger brother of Tolaha Mou, declared himself the Tolaha or regent and took power under the support of the Tây Sơn. King Rama I appointed Yomreach Baen as Chaophraya Aphaiphubet the regent of Cambodia. Chaophraya Aphaiphubet Baen managed to oust Decho Ten in 1790 and took control of whole Cambodia for Siam. King Rama I kept Ang Eng in Bangkok away from Cambodian political conflicts. Aphaiphubet Baen was the regent of Cambodia for twelve years until 1794 when King Rama I allowed Ang Eng to assume personal rule in Cambodia. King Rama I also rewarded Aphaiphubet Baen with the northwestern part of Cambodia including Battambang and Siemreap for Aphaiphubet Baen to govern under direct Siamese suzerainty, thus annexing those territories into Siam proper.

King Ang Eng died in 1796, leaving four sons Princes Ang Chan, Ang Sngoun, Ang Em and Ang Duong. Kralahom Pok, who had become Tolaha Pok, served as the regent of Cambodia until 1806 when he brought the four young Cambodian princes to visit King Rama I at Bangkok. Tolaha Pok fell ill and died at Bangkok. King Rama I installed Ang Chan as the new King of Cambodia in 1806. Emperor Gia Long of the Vietnamese Nguyen dynasty also invested Ang Chan as the King of Cambodia next year in 1807. The new king Ang Chan asked for the permissions for his aunts Princesses Ang E and Ang Pen to return to Cambodia. King Rama I refused, citing that the princesses were already mothers of daughters of the late Prince Surasinghanat. On an occasion, Ang Chan visited King Rama I before returning to Cambodia. However, Ang Chan entered the royal hall without permission and prerequisite ceremonies. King Rama I strongly rebuked Ang Chan in front of Siamese officials. In 1808, Oknha Decho Meng the governor of Kampong Svay rebelled against King Ang Chan.

King Rama I died in 1809. Chaophraya Aphaiphubet also died the same year. King Ang Chan did not attend the funeral of King Rama I at Bangkok and instead sent his younger brothers Ang Sngoun and Ang Em, along with Cambodian nobles Oknha Chakrey Pen and Oknha Kralahom Moeung, to go to Bangkok. King Rama II granted Ang Sngoun and Ang Em the titles of Uprayorach (viceroy) and Ouparach (deputy viceroy), respectively. In the same year, the Burmese invaded Phuket and King Rama II requested supporting troops from Cambodia to defend Bangkok. King Ang Chan, however, did not comply. Chakrey Pen and Kralahom Moeung, the two pro-Siamese Cambodian ministers, then organized troops to be sent to Bangkok without the permission of the Cambodian king. Ang Chan then had Chakrey Pen and Kralahom Moeung executed for sedition on September 14, 1810. Tension arose between Ang Chan and the Siamese court. Ang Chan sent Oknha Bovorneayok Sous to request military aid from the Vietnamese. Nguyễn Văn Nhơn the governor of Saigon led the Vietnamese troops of 1,000 men to take defensive position at Longvek against possible Siamese offensives. Prince Senanurak of the Front Palace ordered Phraya Rongmueang to station Siamese troops at Battambang. The Siamese-Vietnamese standoff lasted for four months until Nguyễn Văn Nhơn pulled the troops back to Saigon in January 1811 but Phraya Rongmueang remained in Battambang.

== Siamese-Vietnamese standoff ==
On 15 January 1812, Prince Ang Sngoun the Uprayorach and younger brother of Ang Chan, left the royal city of Oudong at night along with a group of pro-Siamese mandarins. Ang Sngoun rallied troops at Pursat. Ang Chan sent delegates to visit his brother Ang Sngoun at Pursat, urging him to return to Oudong but to no avail. Ang Chan then decided to ask for Vietnamese support again. Nguyễn Văn Nhơn the governor of Saigon sent Nguyễn Văn Thoại to lead Vietnamese forces of 500 men to station at Longvek. The Siamese court sent Chaophraya Yommaraj Noi to Battambang to lead the Siamese expedition into Cambodia to settle the princely struggle issues. King Ang Chan ordered his generals Oknha Bovorneayok Sous and Oknha Thommeadecho to defend Kampong Chhnang.

Chaophraya Yommaraj Noi sent his delegates to negotiate with Ang Chan at Oudong but Ang Chan gave no responses. Yommaraj Noi, along with Phraya Rongmueang at Battambang, decided to march the Siamese army of 5,000 men down, taking Prince Ang Sngoun from Pursat to attack Kampong Chhnang in April 1812, leading to the Battle of Kampong Chhnang. The Cambodians were outnumbered as Oknha Bovorneayok Sous and Oknha Thommeadecho sent a man to inform King Ang Chan at Oudong that the Siamese came in large numbers. Ang Chan then decided to leave Oudong on April 9, 1812, along with the royal family to take refuge in Phnom Penh. Nguyễn Văn Thoại provided boat vessels for the Cambodian king and his family to travel at Phnom Penh. Princes Ang Em and Ang Duong, two other younger brothers of Ang Chan, decided not to join the king in flight and defected and fled back to the Siamese on April 10. Nguyễn Văn Nhơn then invited Ang Chan to seek safety shelter in Saigon. The Cambodian king and his entourage reached Saigon on April 25, 1812.

Yommaraj Noi and the Siamese army arrived in Oudong to find out that the Cambodian king had escaped to Phnom Penh. The Siamese followed Ang Chan to Phnom Penh but Ang Chan and his retinue had already reached Saigon. Chaophraya Yommaraj Noi sent reconciliatory messages to Ang Chan and Nguyễn Văn Nhơn, declaring that the Siamese intention was to peacefully settle the conflicts. Both Ang Chan and Nguyễn Văn Nhơn did not respond. Nguyễn Văn Nhơn constructed a lavish place for Ang Chan and his family to reside in Saigon. Ang Chan sent Oknha Bovorneayok to Huế as an envoy to Emperor Gia Long who awarded Ang Chan with large sum of money and rice. Yommaraj Noi had been waiting for responses at Oudong. He then decided that when the dry season was over the waters would be high, suitable for Vietnamese fleet to arrive and engage. For his strategically inferior position, Yommaraj Noi burnt down and destroyed Oudong and Phnom Penh to prevent the Vietnamese from taking foothold in these cities and took the pro-Siamese Cambodian Princes Ang Sgnoun, Ang Em and Ang Duong back to Bangkok with him. Thousands of Cambodians were deported to Siamese-controlled northwest Cambodia.

== Aftermath and consequences ==
=== Siamese–Vietnamese diplomatic correspondences ===
Dowager Empress Hiếu Khang the mother of Emperor Gia Long died in 1811. On February 15, 1812, King Rama II dispatched a mission to Huế to attend the funeral. Also, the matter of Cambodian princely conflicts was raised by Siamese court through the Siamese envoy to Gia Long. The Siamese envoy told Gia Long that King Ang Chan had always been rebellious to Siam in spite of Siamese fair treatment on Ang Chan. Gia Long rebuked Siam for invading Cambodia, a peaceful vassal of Siam, replying that the Prince Ang Sngoun was responsible for the incidents because he stirred up the events and was not a loyal subject to his elder brother who was also his overlord. Siamese court was then convinced that Gia Long was in support of Ang Chan. However, going into full-scale war with Vietnam was then untimely due to prospective Burmese threats from the West.

In September 1812, Gia Long replaced Nguyễn Văn Nhơn with Lê Văn Duyệt as Tổng trấn or governor of Saigon. Bangkok court sent another mission to Huế on January 4, 1813 under Phraya Maha-amat (Phi Nhã Ma Kha và A Mặc in Vietnamese source). Gia Long declared that he would restore the Cambodian King Ang Chan to the throne. In April 1813, Gia Long ordered Lê Văn Duyệt the governor of Saigon and Ngô Nhân Tịnh the vice-governor of Saigon to bring troops from Huế to Saigon to escort Ang Chan back to Cambodia. In May, Lê Văn Duyệt led the Vietnamese troop of 13,000 men to bring Ang Chan back to Phnom Penh with Phraya Maha-amat and other Siamese envoys presented in the entourage as witnesses. The entourage departed from Saigon on May 3 and arrived at Kampong Luong near Oudong on 14 May, 1813, thus ending the conflict with restoration of Ang Chan in Cambodia.

=== Establishment of Vietnamese domination in Cambodia ===
When King Ang Chan returned to Cambodia, Oudong, royal capital of Cambodia since 1601, had been destroyed and burnt down by the Siamese. After the Siamese envoys and officials had returned to Battambang, Lê Văn Duyệt proposed to build a new citadel and royal city for Ang Chan. Ang Chan preferred Phnom Penh over Oudong. While Oudong was susceptible to Siamese attacks, Phnom Penh was located riverine and the Vietnamese fleets could accessibly arrive in defense in case of future Siamese attacks. Lê Văn Duyệt then constructed a new citadel for Ang Chan at Phnom Penh called "Banteay Keav". Lê Văn Duyệt constructed another citadel at Lvea Aem as a Vietnamese garrison.

Lê Văn Duyệt assigned Nguyễn Văn Thoại with Vietnamese troops of 1,500 men to guard King Ang Chan. Ang Chan also rewarded his meritorious subjects with high positions, with Oknha Bovorneayok Sous becoming Oknha Chakrey Sous the Minister of War and Tuan Pha, a Cham general, becoming the Yomreach or the Minister of Justice. In 1814, Nguyễn Văn Thoại was appointed as bảo hộ or Protector of Cambodia, essentially Vietnam's representative minister in Cambodia.

King Ang Chan continued to send tributes to the Siamese court annually but also sent tributes to Huế triennially. Cambodia then came under de facto Vietnamese influence, which would remain so until the Siamese-Vietnamese War (1841-1845) for about thirty years.

=== Cambodian attempt to reclaim Battambang (1815) ===
In July 1814, Ang Chan sent Yomreach Tuan Pha and Oknha Thommeadecho to successfully oust Oknha Decho Meng the rebellious governor of Kampong Svay. Ang Chan consulted Nguyễn Văn Thoại about the matter of Battambang and Northwestern Cambodia. Northwestern Cambodia, including Battambang and Siemreap, had been held by Siam through successive Siam-appointed governors, who were subjects of Siamese king not Cambodian king, since 1795. Siam used Battambang as an outpost and main base for many incursions into Cambodia. The Siamese should be expelled from Battambang. Nguyễn Văn Thoại suggested that Ang Chan should send armies to Battambang to evaluate the situation. King Ang Chan then ordered Samdech Chauponhea Tei to lead Cambodian army to Battambang to collect stalactites and bat guano as taxes. Samdech Chauponhea Tei led the Cambodian army to Battambang in April 1815 and sent Oknha Surkealok the governor of Pursat ahead as vanguard. Phraya Aphaiphubet Ros the Siam-appointed governor of Battambang, who was the son of Chaophraya Aphaiphubet Baen, sent counter-offensive army to defeat Oknha Surkealok, who was captured to Bangkok. Samdech Chauponhea Tei then decided to retreat.

King Rama II responded by having regiments from Bangkok and Nakhon Ratchasima stationed at Battambang under the command of his cousin the Prince Kromma Khun Itsaranurak and informed Gia Long that the Vietnamese bảo hộ viceroy had instigated the Cambodian to invade Battambang. Gia Long sent his delegate to conduct investigation in Cambodia and found Samdech Chauponhea Tei guilty. King Ang Chan then ordered Samdech Chauponhea Tei arrested and sent to Vietnamese court for trial in October 1815. Samdech Chauponhea Tei told the Vietnamese court that he marched Cambodian army to Battambang with peaceful intentions only to collect taxes. The Vietnamese sent Samdech Chauponhea Tei back to King Ang Chan for punishment and urged the Bangkok court to punish the governor of Battambang also for his over-reaction.

== See also ==
- Cambodian rebellion (1820)
- Cambodian rebellion (1840)

== Notes ==
Footnote

Citations
