= Cambodian conflict =

Cambodian conflict may refer to:

- Cambodian Civil War
- Cambodian conflict (1979–1998)
- Cambodian conflict (1812–1813)
- Cambodian–Thai border dispute
  - 2008–2011 Cambodian–Thai border crisis
  - 2025 Cambodia–Thailand border conflict

== See also ==
- Category:Wars involving Cambodia
