= Ang Snguon (prince) =

Joint King of Cambodia (1810–1822)

Ang Sngoun អង្គស្ងួន
- Great Joint King of Cambodia

Ouprayorach of Cambodia
- Reign: 1810 – 1822
- King: Ang Chan II
- Ouparach: Ang Em
- Born: 1794; Cambodia, Oudong
- Died: 1822 (aged 27–28); Cambodia, Oudong
- Father: Ang Eng
- Mother: Anak Munang Ut
- Religion: Buddhism

Ang Snguon (Khmer: អង្គស្ងួន, 1794–1822) was a Cambodian prince. He was the third son of King Ang Eng. (Note: In Vietnamese records, he was called Nặc Nguyên (匿原); In Thai records, he was called Nak Ong Sa-nguan (Thai: นักองค์สงวน).)

The Siamese king Rama I died in 1809. King Ang Chan II refused to attend his royal cremation. Instead, Ang Chan sent three Cambodian princes, including Ang Snguon, Ang Em and Ang Duong, to attend the funeral. Ang Snguon and Ang Em were appointed Cambodian Uprayorach (Note: The title Uprayorach (ឧភយោរាជ, also spelled Upayuvaraja) meant "Great Joint King", usually borne by kings who had abdicated but retained executive powers. The rank was lower than the king, higher than Upraracha; some scholars called Uprayorach the first viceroy while called Upraracha the second viceroy.) and Upraracha by Rama II respectively. There were several high ministers supported Snguon, including Phraya Chakri (Baen) and Phraya Kalahom (Muang).

Rama II's action obviously polarised the Cambodian court into pro-Siamese and pro-Vietnamese factions. After the envoy returned to Cambodia, Ang Chan had Phraya Chakri and Phraya Kalahom executed. Ang Snguon, Ang Em and Ang Duong escaped from Oudong secretly with hundred followers, they fled to Pursat and sought aid from Siamese. In response, a Siamese army marched to Cambodia in 1811. The Cambodian defectors were placed in Battambang. With the help of Siamese army, Snguon demanded Ang Chan to grant three districts to him, but was rejected. Snguon's forces marched to seize Sambour, Kampong Chhnang and Oudong. When the news reached Phnom Penh, Ang Chan was taken to Saigon by Vietnamese. Ang Sngoun was appointed the regent.

Vietnam sent a large army to restore Ang Chan. When the news reached Bangkok, Rama II ordered Ang Sngoun, Ang Em and Ang Duong to take their followers to Bangkok.

Sngoun died of illness in Bangkok in 1822.

== Notes ==
Footnote

Citations
