= Prasat Andat =

Hindu Temple in Cambodia

Prasat Andat is a Hindu temple in the village of Prasat, in Kampong Svay District, in the Kampong Thom Province of Cambodia. It was constructed in the second half of the 7th century, sometime between 627 and 707 during the Jayavarman I era. The temple was dedicated to the Hindu god Harihara.
