= Ang Em (prince) =

Ang Em អង្គឥម

Ouparach Deputy Viceroy of Cambodia
- In office 1810–1843
- Monarch: Ang Chan II

Siam-appointed governor of Battambang
- In office 1834–1839
- Monarch: Rama III
- Preceded by: Phraya Aphaiphubet Chet
- Succeeded by: Phra Phithakbodin Som

Personal details
- Born: 1794 Bangkok, Siam
- Died: 1843 (aged 48–49) Châu Đốc, Cochinchina
- Spouse: Princess Puyani
- Children: Prince Ang Phim; Princess Kessarey; Princess Samor; Princess Ang Ing; Princess Daracar
- Parents: Ang Eng (father); Anak Munang Ratna (mother)

Ang Em (also spelled Ang Im; Khmer: អង្គឥម; 1794–1843) was a Cambodian prince. He was the fourth son of King Ang Eng. (Note: In Vietnamese records, he was called Nặc Yêm (匿俺); In Thai records, he was called Nak Ong Im (Thai: นักองค์อิ่ม).)

The Siamese king Rama I died in 1809. King Ang Chan II refused to attend his royal cremation. Instead, Ang Chan sent three Cambodian princes, including Ang Snguon, Ang Em and Ang Duong, to attend the funeral. Ang Em was appointed Cambodian Upraracha by Rama II. The Uprayorach Ang Snguon ousted Ang Chan in 1811. After Vietnamese intervention, Ang Snguon, Ang Em and Ang Duong fled to Bangkok.

After the Lê Văn Khôi revolt broke out in Cochinchina, Chaophraya Bodindecha (Sing Sinhaseni) invaded Cambodia, aiming to put Ang Em on the throne. However, they were not supported by Cambodian. Siamese army had to withdraw from Cambodia in 1834.

Ang Em was appointed the governor of Battambang in 1834 by Siamese. Siamese army occupied northwest provinces (Battambang, Siem Reap, Pursat and Kampong Svai), northwest provinces were rulered de jure by two Cambodian princes, Ang Em and Ang Duong. The Siamese hoped that the princes would be able to draw loyalty and support from Khmer nobles. Two princes were regarded as the most dangerous men by Vietnamese court; Trương Minh Giảng, the Vietnamese Governor-General of Trấn Tây, tried to persuade them to go back to Cambodia. Actually it was a conspiracy designed by Giảng. In 1837, Duong was suspected of having links with Vietnamese, and deported to Bangkok. Two years later, Em and his followers secretly fled back to Cambodia, Em was under the illusion that he would be installed the new king, however, they were arrested by Vietnamese. Giảng suggested that they should be executed, but Minh Mạng rejected. Ang Em was deported Saigon then to Huế.

Cambodia was annexed by Vietnam in 1840. Spurred by Queen Ang Mey's deposition, many Cambodian courtiers and their followers revolted against the Vietnamese rule. Siamese army entered Cambodia to install Ang Duong on the throne. Ang Em was released together with Ang Mey. In the next year, Trương Minh Giảng tried to put him on the throne as Vietnamese puppet king. Em and Mey came to Cambodia, they ordered Khmer rebels to surrender, but no one obeyed. Em died in Châu Đốc in 1843.

== Notes ==
Footnote

Citations
