= Ang Eng =

Cambodian King

Ang Eng Neareay Reachea III

King of Cambodia
- First reign: 1779–1782
- Coronation: 1793
- Predecessor: Ang Non II
- Successor: Interregnum (Talaha Pen as regent)
- Second reign: 1794 – 5 May 1796
- Coronation: 28 May 1794
- Predecessor: Interregnum (Talaha Pen as regent)
- Successor: Interregnum (Talaha Pok as regent in 1796–1806); Ang Chan II (from 1806)
- Born: 1773
- Died: 5 May 1796 (aged 22–23); Oudong, Cambodia
- Issue: Ang Chan; Ang Bhim; Ang Snguon; Ang Em; Ang Duong
Names
- Neareay Reachea III
- House: Oudong
- Father: Outey II
- Religion: Buddhism

Ang Eng (Note: Known in Thai sources as Nak Ong Eng (นักองค์เอง); in Vietnamese records as Nặc Ấn (匿印).) (Khmer: អង្គអេង [ʔɑŋ ʔeːŋ]; 1773 – 5 May 1796) was King of Cambodia from 1779 to his death in 1796. He reigned under the name of Neareay Reachea III (Khmer: នារាយណ៍រាជាទី៣).

Ang Eng was a son of Outey II (Narayraja II). He was installed as the Cambodian king by Talaha (Mu), who acted as regent, and was pro-Vietnamese. Talaha rebelled against Siam, Taksin decided on an invasion of Cambodia. A Siamese army under Thongdoang-chakri was dispatched to Cambodia to crown Inthraphithak as the new king of Cambodia. However, a coup occurred in the same year. Thongdoang-chakri and Maha Surasi marched back to Siam. Later, in 1782, Thongdoang-chakri was crowned as the new Siamese monarch and became King Rama I.

In 1782, the Tây Sơn dynasty of Vietnam attacked Gia Định and defeated the Nguyễn lord. The Vietnamese lost their control of Cambodia. Phraya Yommarat (Baen) and Phraya Kalahom (Su) captured Oudong and had Mu executed. Later, Baen killed Su and became the new regent. Cham rebels attacked Phnom Penh, and Ang Eng had to flee to Siam. Rama I had him captured and deported to Bangkok, where Rama I adopted him as his son. During the king's absence, Baen was promoted to Chaophraya Aphaiphubet and was appointed the regent of Cambodia and, thereby, worked for Siam.

Ang Eng was installed as the king by the Siamese and sent back to Oudong. The Cambodian court split into two factions, as one supported Ang Eng and the other supported Baen. In order to prevent civil war in Cambodia, Rama I ordered Baen to leave Oudong. Battambang and Siem Reap were separated from Cambodia and ceded to Siam. Baen was appointed the governor of these provinces.

When Ang Eng died in 1796, his son Ang Chan II succeeded to the throne.

== Issue ==
Princess Moneang Aut
Ang Chan
Ang Snguon

Princess Moneang Ke
Ang Phim

Princess Moneang Ros
Ang Em
Ang Duong

== Gallery ==
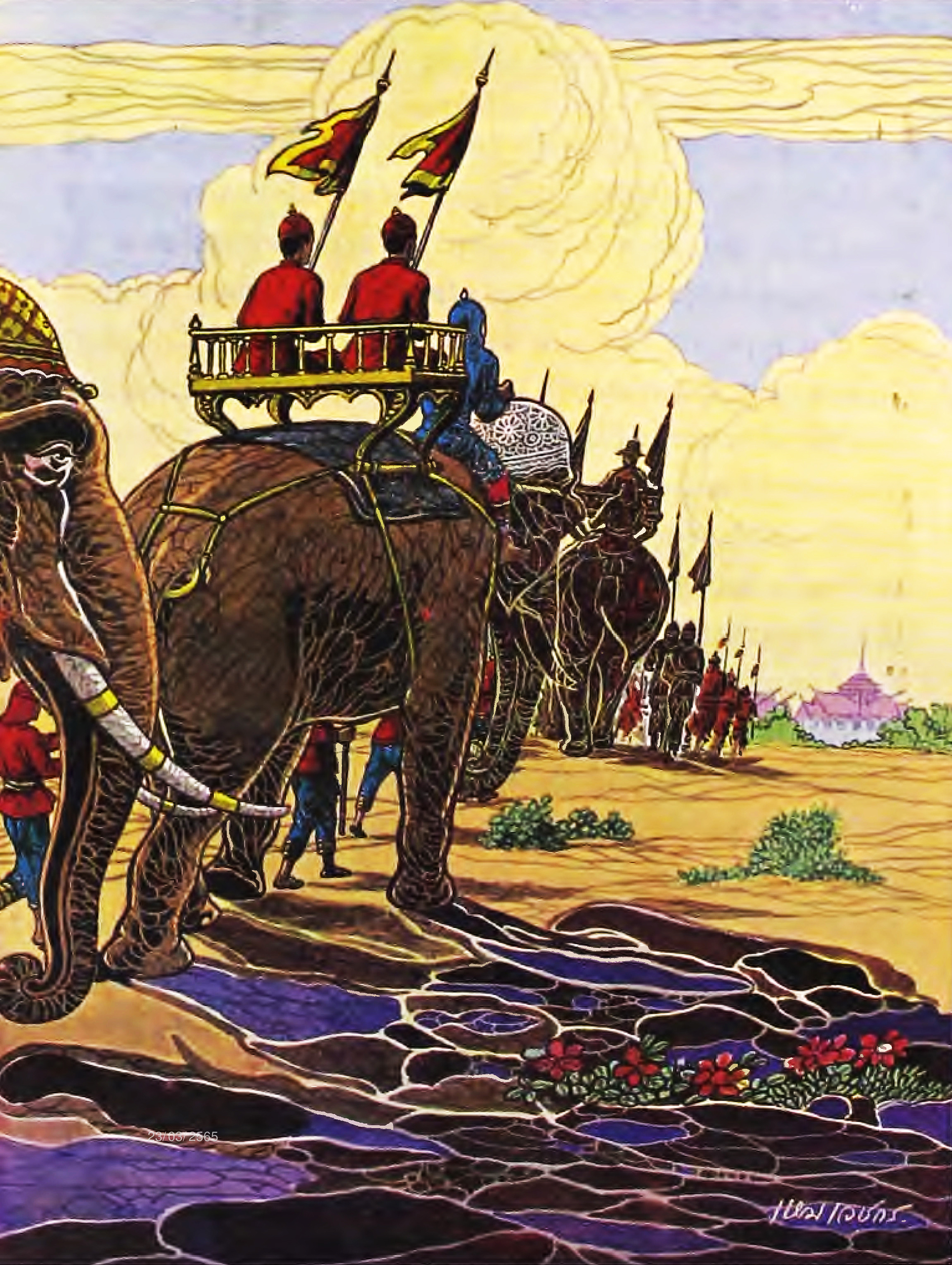
An illustration showing Cambodian prince Ang Eng leaving Bangkok in 1794/95 to return home and assume the throne.

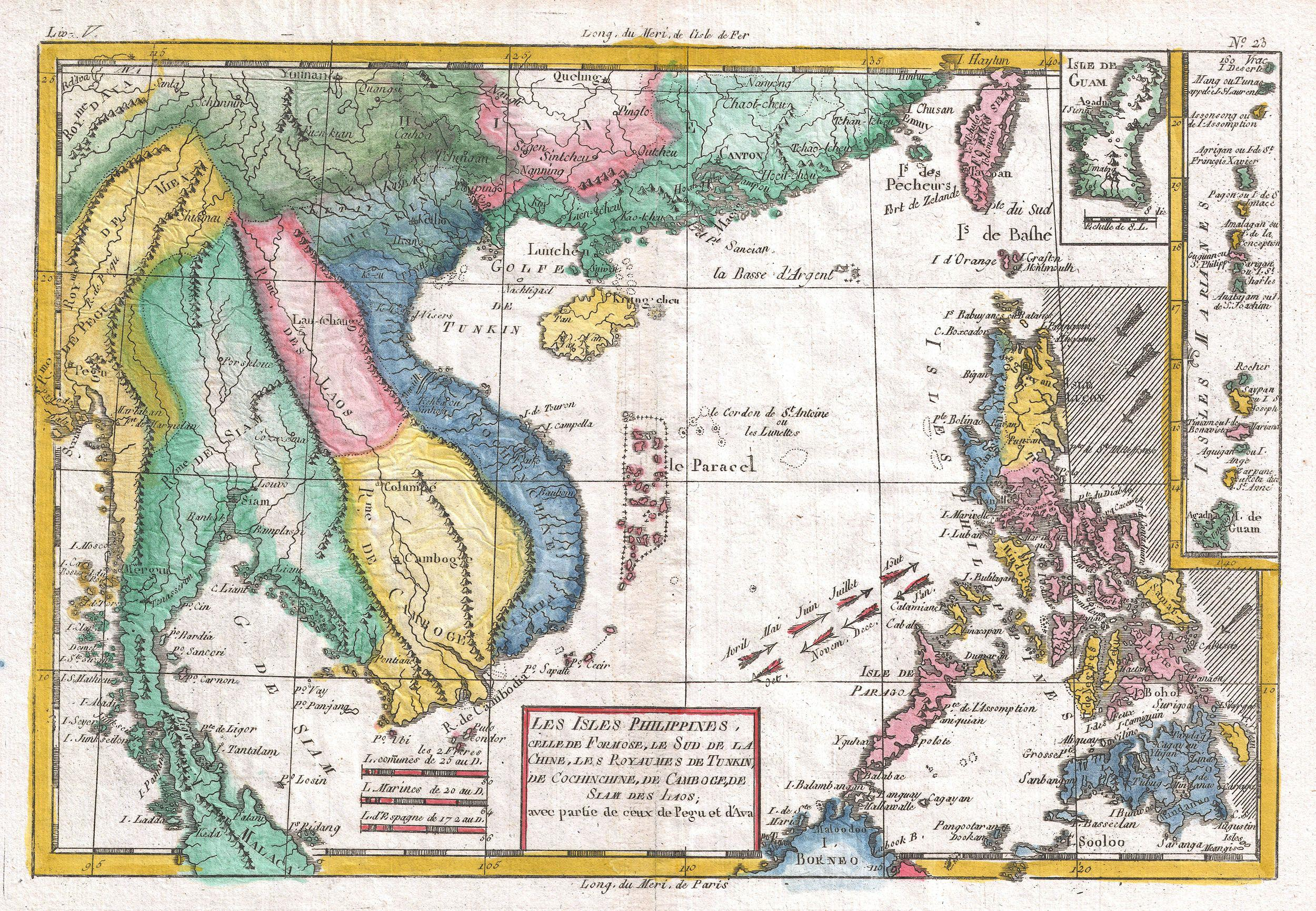
1780 map of Cambodia and mainland Southeast Asia.

== Sources ==
- Achille Dauphin-Meunier Histoire du Cambodge Que sais-je ? N° 916, P.U.F Paris 1968.
- Anthony Stokvis, Manuel d'histoire, de généalogie et de chronologie de tous les États du globe, depuis les temps les plus reculés jusqu'à nos jours, préf. H. F. Wijnman, Israël, 1966, Chapitre XIV §.9 "Kambodge" Listes et tableau généalogique n°34 p. 337–338.
- Peter Truhart, Regents of Nations, K.G Saur Munich, 1984–1988, ISBN 359810491X, Art. " Kampuchea ", p. 1732.
- Khin Sok "Quelques documents khmers relatifs aux relations entre le Cambodge et l'Annam en 1843". Dans : Bulletin de l'École française d'Extrême-Orient. Tome 74, 1985. p. 403–421.

Ang Eng Varman Dynasty Born: 1773 Died: 8 November 1796
Regnal titles
Preceded by Ang Non II	King of Cambodia; 1779–1796	Succeeded by Ang Chan II
