= Ang Chan II =

King of Cambodia (1806–1834)

Ang Chan II Outey Reachea III
- .

King of Cambodia
- Reign: 1806 – 1834
- Coronation: 26 July 1806
- Predecessor: Ang Eng (until 1796); Interregnum (Chaofa Talaha Pok as regent in 1796–1806)
- Successor: Interregnum (1834–1835); Ang Mey (from 1835)
- Upayuvarāj: Ang Snguon
- Uparāj: Ang Em
- Born: 1791; Oudong, Cambodia
- Died: 1834 (aged 42–43); Oudong, Cambodia
- Spouse: Neak Moneang Thep; Neak Moneang Krachap; Neak Moneang Yos; Neak Moneang Pen
- Issue: Ang Ben; Ang Mey; Ang Pou; Ang Snguon; Ang Pukombo
- Outey Reachea II
- House: Royal House of Cambodia
- Father: Ang Eng
- Mother: Neak Moneang Ut
- Religion: Theravada Buddhism

Ang Chan II (Khmer: ព្រះបាទអង្គចន្ទទី២; 1791 – 1834) was King of Cambodia from 1806 to his death in 1834. He reigned under the name of Outey Reachea III (Khmer: ឧទ័យរាជាទី៣).

Ang Chan II was the eldest son of Ang Eng, who died in 1796 when Ang Chan II was only five years old. Prince Talaha Pok (Khmer: ចៅហ្វ៊ាប៉ុក, Thai: เจ้าฟ้าทะละหะ (ปก)) was appointed the regent of Cambodia. Ang Chan II was not allowed to go to Cambodia until Pok died in 1806.

In 1806, Ang Chan II was crowned king. His two brothers, Ang Em and Ang Snguon. In order to gain power from the two brothers, Ang Chan got closer to the Vietnamese. In the next year, he started to pay tribute to Vietnam. Two Vietnamese officials, Ngô Nhân Tịnh and Trần Công Đàn, came to Longvek and granted him the title Cao Miên quốc vương ("king of Cambodia").

The Siamese demanded Ang Chan appoint Ang Snguon and Ang Em as the uprayorach and ouparach, respectively, but Ang Chan refused. In 1811, with the help of the Siamese, Ang Snguon overthrew him. Ang Chan fled to Saigon. His two brothers were appointed regents by the Siamese. In 1813, a Vietnamese army under Lê Văn Duyệt invaded Cambodia and captured Oudong. Ang Chan returned with the Vietnamese army. Ang Em and Ang Snguon fled to Bangkok. After a rebellion, Cambodia was put under the protection of Vietnam. The Vietnamese built two fortresses, Nam Vang (Phnom Penh) and La Yêm (Lvea Aem), to station their forces. One thousand men under Nguyễn Văn Thoại were sent to Phnom Penh to "protect" him.

He was ordered to collect the Cambodian Royal Chronicles in 1818.

In 1819, Ang Chan sent 5,000 Khmer labourers to reconstruct the Vietnamese Vĩnh Tế Canal. An anti-Vietnamese rebellion broke out the next year, but was put down by the Vietnamese army.

Ang Chan died in 1834, and his second daughter, Ang Mey, was installed as queen.

== Sources ==
- Achille Dauphin-Meunier Histoire du Cambodge Que sais-je ? N° 916 P.U.F Paris 1968.
- Khin Sok « Quelques documents khmers relatifs aux relations entre le Cambodge et l'Annam en 1843 ». Dans : Bulletin de l'École française d'Extrême-Orient. Tome 74, 1985. P. 403–421.

Ang Chan II Varman Dynasty Born: 1792 December
Regnal titles
Preceded by Ang Eng	King of Cambodia; 1806 – 1834	Succeeded by Ang Mey
