= Châu Đốc =

Coordinates: 10°42′N 105°08′E

- Ward
- Country: Vietnam
- Province: An Giang
- Time zone: UTC+07:00 (Indochina Time)
- Climate: Aw

Châu Đốc is a ward (phường) of An Giang Province, Vietnam.

== Geography ==
Châu Đốc Ward has the following geographical boundaries:

- East: Borders the communes of Châu Phong, Hòa Lạc, Mỹ Đức, and Vĩnh Hậu.
- West: Borders Cambodia.
- South: Borders Vĩnh Tế Ward and Mỹ Đức Commune.
- North: Borders An Phú Commune.

=== Area and population ===
As of 2024, Châu Đốc Ward covers a total area of 41.32 km^{2} (15.95 sq mi) and has a population of 97,438. The population density is 2,358/km^{2} (6,110/sq mi).
