= Kampong Svay district =

Kampong Svay ស្រុកកំពង់ស្វាយ
- District (srok)
- Location in Cambodia
- Coordinates: 12°35′N 104°45′E
- Country: Cambodia
- Province: Kampong Thom
- Time zone: +7
- Geocode: 0602

Kampong Svay is a district within Kampong Thom province, in central Cambodia. According to the 1998 census of Cambodia, it had a population of 74,843.

== Administration ==
The following table shows the villages of Kampong Svay District by commune.

Khum (communes)	Phum (villages)
Chey	Mohar, Ta Theav, Lvea, Trapeang Areaks, Prey Tob, Koun Tnaot
Damrei Slab	Sangkum, Kab Thlok, Mongkol Sla, Voa Yeav, Damrei Slab
Kampong Kou	Kampong Kou Leu, Kampong Kou Kraom, Khsach Chi Ros, Bou Pueng, Kaoh Krob Bay
Kampong Svay	Kampong Svay, Tiem Chas, Tnaot, Enteak Komar, Chong Prey, Prey Preah, Ta Paong, Ta Am, Chrang Kraham, Ou Sala, Anlong Krasang, Souchey
Nipech	Nipech ka, Nipech Kha, Doun Chhuk
Phat Sanday	Kampong Chamlang, Phat Sanday, Neang Sav, Tuol Neang Sav, Kaoh Ta Pov
San Kor	Prasat, Balang, Tang Krouch, Veal, Chey, Slaeng Khpos, Sari, Sampov Meas, Kbel, Ampil, San Kor Ka, San Kor Kha, Krasang Ka, Krasang Kha
Tbaeng	Trach, Ta Ream, Ruessei Cheah, Pou, Prey Pras, Boeng Andaeng, Ta Am, Tbaeng Ka, Tbaeng Kha, Bakong, Tram Khla, Srangae, Ou Ambaeng, Phlong, Chheu Teal
Trapeang Ruessei	Prey Preal Ka, Prey Preal Kha, Prasat, Rung, Romeang Ngoab, Snao, Trapeang Thma, Voa Yeav, Thnal Baek, Trapeang Prolit, Kouk Nguon, Krasang, Lvea Choum, Samraong, Trapeang Ruessei, Serei Vongs, Lvey, Trapeang Chambak, Ou Rumdeng, Thnal Baek Ka
Kdei Doung	Kdei Doung, Peam Kraeng, Ou Sambuor, Slaeng
Prey Kuy	Prey Kuy, Anlong Louk, Sambuor, Bendei, Pren, Kampong Krabei, Svay Khlouk, Prey Kuy Ka

== See also ==
- Prasat Andat
