= Lvea Aem District =

Lvea Aem ស្រុកល្វាឯម
- District
- Location in Cambodia
- Coordinates: 11°32′24″N 105°3′32″E
- Country: Cambodia
- Province: Kandal
- Communes: 15
- Villages: 43

Population (1998)
  - Total: 65,835
- Time zone: UTC+7 (ICT)
- Geocode: 0806

Lvea Aem District (Khmer: ស្រុកល្វាឯម) is a district (srok) of Kandal Province, Cambodia. The district is subdivided into 15 communes (khum) such as Akreiy Ksatr, Barong, Boeng Krum, Kaoh Kaev, Kaoh Reah, Lvea Sa, Peam Oknha Ong, Phum Thum, Preaek Kmeng, Preaek Rey, Preaek Ruessei, Sambuor, Sarikakaev, Thma Kor, Tuek Khleang and 43 villages (phum).

== Administrative divisions ==
Lvea Aem District is divided into the following khums

Code	Name	Khmer	Villages (Phums)
080601	Ariyaksat	អរិយក្សត្រ	Ariyaksat (អរិយក្សត្រ), Khsach (ខ្សាច់), Pouthom (ពោធិ៍ធំ), Tuolmeas (ទួលមាស)
080602	Barung	បារុង	Khnorkar (ខ្នុរការ), Barung (បារុង)
080603	Boeng Krum	បឹងគ្រំ	Upper Boeng Krum (បឹងគ្រំលើ), Lower Boeng Krum (បឹងគ្រំក្រោម)
080604	Koh Keo	កោះកែវ	Upper Koh Keo (កោះកែវលើ), Lower Koh Keo (កោះកែវក្រោម)
080605	Koh Reah	កោះរះ	Upper Koh Reah (កោះរះលើ), Lower Koh Reah (កោះរះក្រោម)
080606	Lvea Sa	ល្វាស	Upper Lvea Sa (ល្វាសលើ), Middle Lvea Sa (ល្វាសកណ្ដាល), Lower Lvea Sa (ល្វាសក្រោម)
080607	Peam Oknha Ong	ពាមឧកញ៉ាអុង	Peam Ta Aek (ពាមតាឯក), Prek Ta Ong I (ព្រែកតាអុងទី១), Prek Ta Ong II (ព្រែកតាអុងទី២), Prek Ta Ong III (ព្រែកតាអុងទី៣), Vealthom (វាលធំ)
080608	Phum Thum	ភូមិធំ	Prek Ta Prang (ព្រែកតាប្រាំង), Prek Kruoch (ព្រែកក្រូច)
080609	Prek Kmeng	ព្រែកក្មេង	Prek Kmeng (ព្រែកក្មេង), Tuol Trea (ទួលទ្រា)
080910	Prek Rey	ព្រែករៃ	Prekrey (ព្រែករៃ), Prek Chhmuoh (ព្រែកឈ្មោះ), Prek Kong Reach (ព្រែកគង់រាជ)
080611	Prek Russey	ព្រែកឫស្សី	Krapeu Ha (ក្រពើហា), Prek Russey (ព្រែកឫស្សី), Prek Anhchanh (ព្រែកអញ្ចាញ), West Prek Russey (ព្រែកឫស្សីលិច), East Krapeu Ha (ក្រពើហាកើត)
080612	Sambuor	សំបួរ	3 villages
080613	Sarika Keo	សារិកាកែវ	Ta Chou (តាជោ), Kdey Kandal (ក្ដីកណ្ដាល), Ta Skor (តាស្គរ)
080614	Thma Kor	ថ្មគរ	Thma Kor (ថ្មគរ), Phlov Trey (ផ្លូវត្រី)
080615	Tuek Khleang	ទឹកឃ្លាំង	Tuek Khleang (ទឹកឃ្លាំង), Samroung (សំរោង), Chrouy Pisey (ជ្រោយពិសី)
