= Ang Duong =

King of Cambodia from 1848 to 1860

- Reamea Thipadei IV
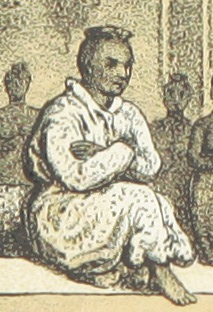
- Ang Duong (c. 1851) depicted in a sketch published in 1882

King of Cambodia
- Reign: 1841 or 1848–1860
- Coronation: 7 March 1848
- Predecessor: Ang Mey (until 1846); Interregnum (1846–1848)
- Successor: Norodom
- Born: 12 June 1796; Oudong, Cambodia
- Died: 19 October 1860 (aged 64); Oudong, Cambodia
- Burial: Oudong Mountain
- Spouse: 38 consorts and concubines
- Issue: Norodom; Sisowath; Si Votha among others
Names
- Harireak Reamea Issarathipadei Ang Duong
- Father: Ang Eng
- Mother: Vara
- Religion: Buddhism

Modern kings of Cambodia
- Ang Duong
- Norodom
- Sisowath
- Sisowath Monivong
- Norodom Sihanouk (first reign)
- Norodom Suramarit
- Sisowath Kossamak (ceremonial queen)
- Norodom Sihanouk (second reign)
- Norodom Sihamoni

Ang Duong (Note: Known in Thai sources as Nak Ong Duang (นักองด้วง) or Phra Ong Duang (พระองค์ด้วง); in Vietnamese records as Nặc Ông Đôn ( 匿螉𧑒).) (Khmer: អង្គឌួង, romanized: Ǎng Duang [ʔɑŋ ɗuəŋ]; 12 June 1796 – 19 October 1860) was the King of Cambodia from 1841 or 1848 to his death in 1860. Formally invested in 1848, (Note: mutually accepted by Thailand and Vietnam) his rule benefited a kingdom that had suffered from several centuries of royal dissent and decline.

His politics focused on sustained national unity and identity and the minimization of foreign interference. He issued the first substantial revision of the legal codex in centuries, and he encouraged and supervised religious and cultural reforms. Confronted with increasing Siamese and Vietnamese encroachment, he attempted to establish an alliance with colonial France on a sovereign basis. Although this alliance ultimately culminated in the 90-year period of the French protectorate of Cambodia, King Ang Duong's actions were the foundation for the modern united state of Cambodia. Ang Duong ascended the throne with the title Preah Karuna Preah Bat Samdech Preah Harireak Reamea Issathipadei Ang Duong (Khmer: ព្រះករុណា ព្រះបាទសម្ដេចព្រះហរិរក្សរាមាឥស្សាធិបតី អង្គឌួង).

He was the progenitor of the two main royal houses of Cambodia, the Houses of Norodom and Sisowath.

== Family ==
Ang Duong was the son of King Ang Eng, who ruled Cambodia from 1779 to 1797 and resided at the then capital Oudong. His mother was Ros, a royal consort since 1793 and later Queen Vara (died around 1869). Ang Duong was the father of his successor King Norodom (1834–1904), King Sisowath (1840–1927) and was the great-great-grandfather (Note: Three grandchildren of Ang Duong (a son and daughter of Norodom who were the parents of Norodom Suramarit and Sisowath's son Sisowath Monivong who was the father of Kossamak) were grandparents of Norodom Sihanouk.) of King Norodom Sihanouk (1922–2012). Dedicated to extend the royal family line, Ang Duong had numerous wives and produced 18 legitimate children – 11 sons and 7 daughters.

== History ==
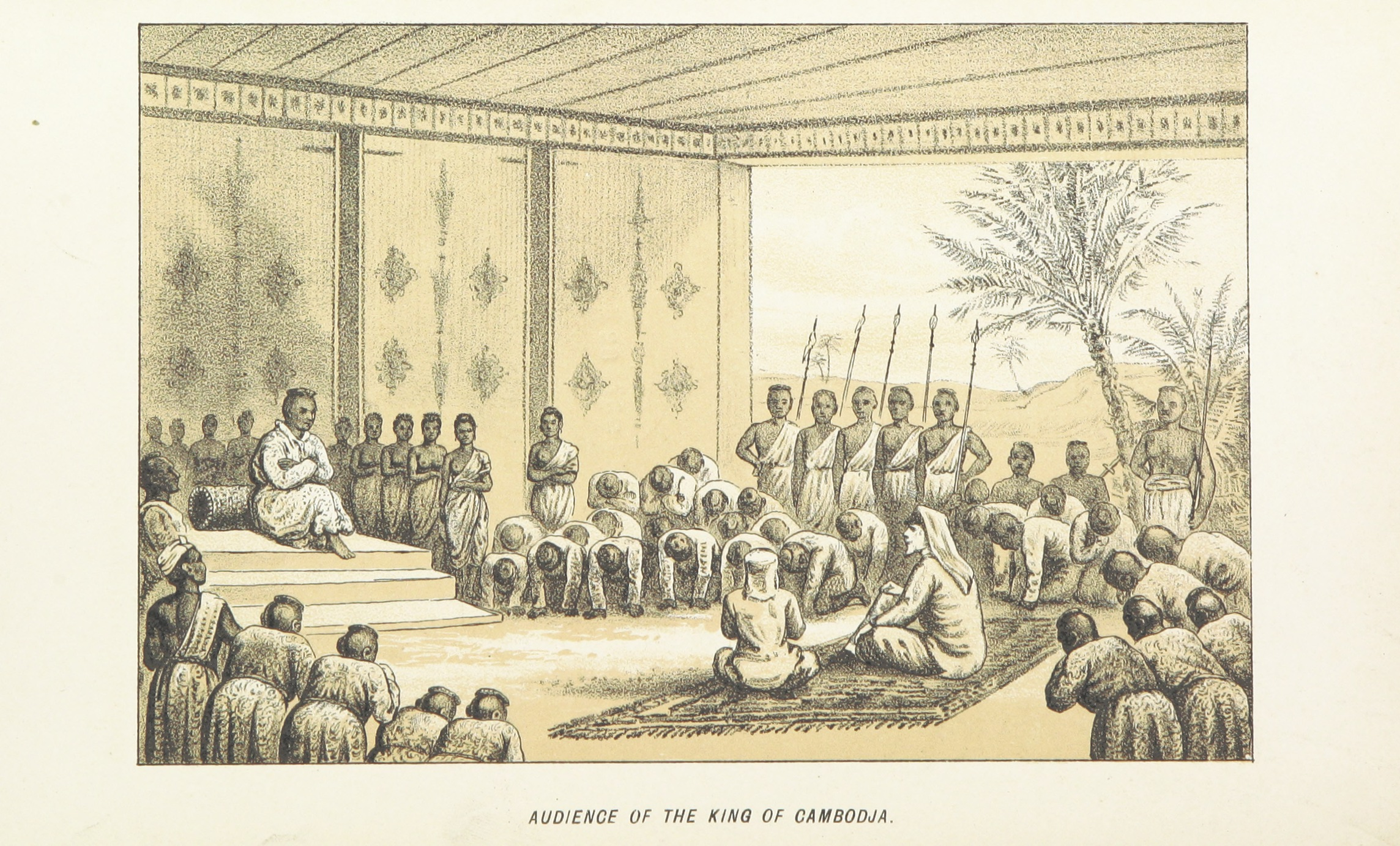
King Ang Duong receiving Ludvig Verner Helms in 1851. The sketch was published by Helms in Pioneering in the Far East (1882).

King Ang Duong is acclaimed as a promoter of national unity after centuries of regression and venerated among modern Cambodians for his efforts to revitalize the nation and protect the kingdom from foreign invasion. However, limited power, poverty and internal dissension prevented lasting success. He spent 27 years in Bangkok from the age of 16 until aged 43. During his residence in Thailand Ang Duong composed poetry, authored and published classical Cambodian literature such as Neang Kakey and historical works and later promoted the enactment of a comprehensive reformed legal codex and participated in the artistic development of Khmer classical dance. He translated the Cambodian folktale Vorvong & Sorvong into the Thai language as a birthday present for Thai Crown prince Mongkut. He was appointed governor of the then Thai Mongkol Borey District in 1834. Later Ang Duong was crowned King of Cambodia in Bangkok and returned to Oudong.

=== Political background ===
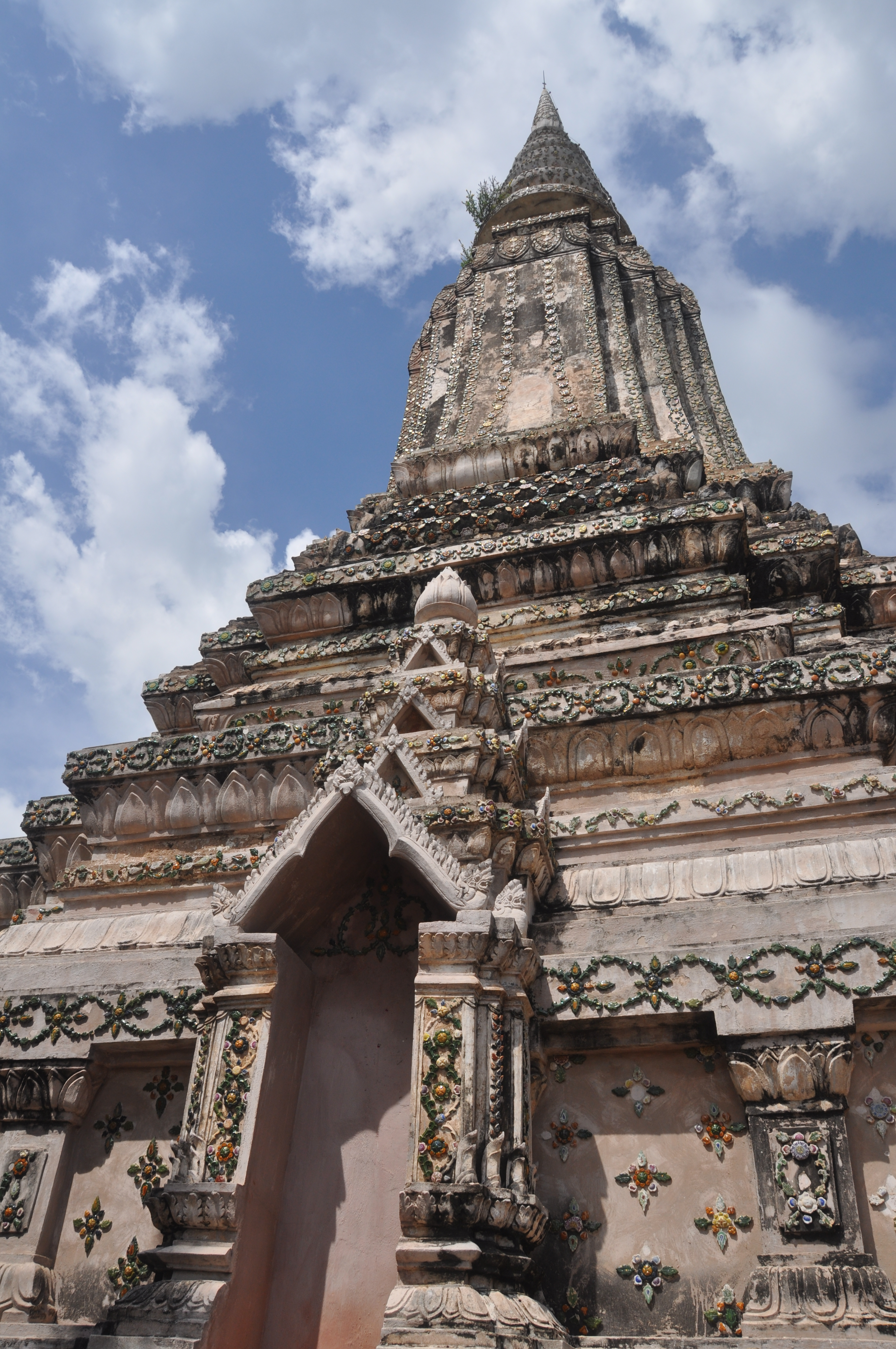
Stupa of Ang Duong.

Siam (modern-day Thailand), which since the late eighteenth-century royal investiture of General Chakri was governed by a well established dynasty, and Vietnam, united since 1802 under Emperor Gia Long, increasingly fought over control of the fertile Mekong basin, the Cambodian heartland. Siam had after the 1594 conquest of Cambodia's capital Longvek and the permanent annexation of Cambodia's Battambang and Siem Reap provinces introduced a tradition of taking Cambodian royalty hostage and relocate them at the court of Ayutthaya. Thus, Siam effectively controlled Cambodian national policies and royal succession. After Siam's failed attempt to extend its campaign into southern Vietnam during the Siamese–Vietnamese War of 1833–1834, Vietnamese forces drove the Siamese back and reasserted control over Cambodia, restoring King Ang Chan II to the throne in 1834. Following Ang Chan's death in 1835, Vietnam increased its direct influence in Cambodia and installed Princess Ang Mey as ruler under Vietnamese supervision. In 1841, Cambodian opposition to Vietnamese rule helped prompt a renewed Siamese intervention, beginning the Siamese–Vietnamese War of 1841–1845. Although the war ended without a decisive battlefield victory, the 1845 settlement left Cambodia under joint Siamese and Vietnamese suzerainty and paved the way for the recognition of Ang Duong as king.

Author Justin Corfield wrote in "French Indochina": "[1807] the Vietnamese expanded their lands by establishing a protectorate over Cambodia. However king […] Ang Duong was keen on Cambodia becoming independent of [...] Thailand [...] and Vietnam [...] and sought help from the British in Singapore. When that failed, he enlisted the help of the French." British agent John Crawfurd states: "...the King of that ancient Kingdom is ready to throw himself under the protection of any European nation..." King Ang Duong's policies paved the way for France to establish a Protectorate in 1863 which lasted for 90 years. In order to preserve the kingdom's national identity and integrity, King Ang Duong initiated secret negotiations in a letter to Napoleon III proposing some form of cooperation with France. King Ang Duong died in 1860, three years before negotiations had concluded. King Norodom Prohmbarirak signed and officially recognized the French protectorate on 11 August 1863, that was effectively incorporated into the Indochinese Union in 1867.

There has been considerable debate over the wisdom of Duong's policies. Nonetheless, the idea that he actively sought to subject his kingdom to colonial serfdom has been contested. Contrary to the assertions of some 19th-century French authors, Duong did not seek the imposition of a French protectorate over his country, he rather pondered the feasibility of some ill-defined, unequal relationship with France. He certainly was aware, that the French main objective for a protectorate was the containment of the British and the creation of a secure flank for Cochinchina. The historic reality of 19th century Asia reminded any local ruler to seek alignment of some form or the other with at least one of the then technological more advanced Western powers. Ang Duong's death in October 1860 and accumulating foreign pressure convinced his son King Norodom Prohmbarirak to agree to the initially rather moderate French terms.

Cambodia was able to preserve its identity, culture and traditions during the French colonial period, which might otherwise have diffused into the modern Vietnamese and Siamese nations, that could have absorbed all Cambodian territory as their modern border most likely would be the Mekong river.

== See also ==
- Literature of Cambodia

== Notes ==
Footnotes

Ang Duong Born: 12 June 1796 Died: 19 October 1860
Regnal titles
Preceded by Ang Mey	King of Cambodia; 1848–1860	Succeeded by Norodom
