= Oudong =

Former capital of Cambodia

Oudong ឧដុង្គ
- Town
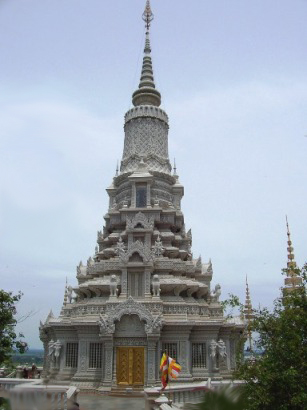
- Phnom Oudong
- Nickname: City of Past Kings
- Location within Cambodia
- Coordinates: 11°49′26″N 104°44′33″E
- Country: Cambodia
- Province: Kampong Speu
- District: Oudong
- Commune: Phsar Daek
- Established: 1618
- Time zone: UTC+7 (Cambodia)

Oudong (Khmer: ឧដុង្គ, romanized: Ŭdŏng; Khmer pronunciation: [u.ɗoŋ]) is a former town of the post-Angkorian period (1618–1863) situated in present-day Phsar Daek Commune, Kampong Speu Province, Cambodia, near the border between Kandal Province and Kampong Chhnang Province. Located at the foothill of the mountain Phnom Oudong, also known as Phnom Preah Reach Troap (Khmer: ភ្នំព្រះរាជ្យទ្រព្យ), about 35 km northwest of the modern capital Phnom Penh via National Road No. 5, Oudong was a royal residence and Cambodia's capital for almost 250 years until 1866. A monumental royal necropolis of sovereigns of several centuries is scattered on top of the prominent bisected mountain, which runs from the southeast to the northeast.

== Etymology ==
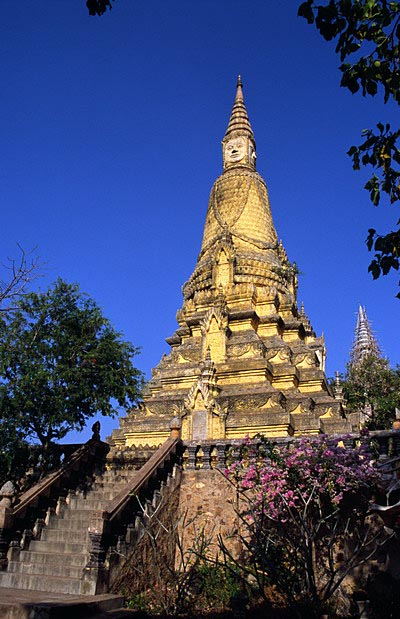
Stupas at Oudong

The city's name is derived from the Sanskrit word "uttuṅga" (Sanskrit: उत्तुङ्ग), meaning tall, which probably refers to the mountain. As it had gained religious merit and significance it might have undergone extension towards: "great" or "supreme".

== History ==
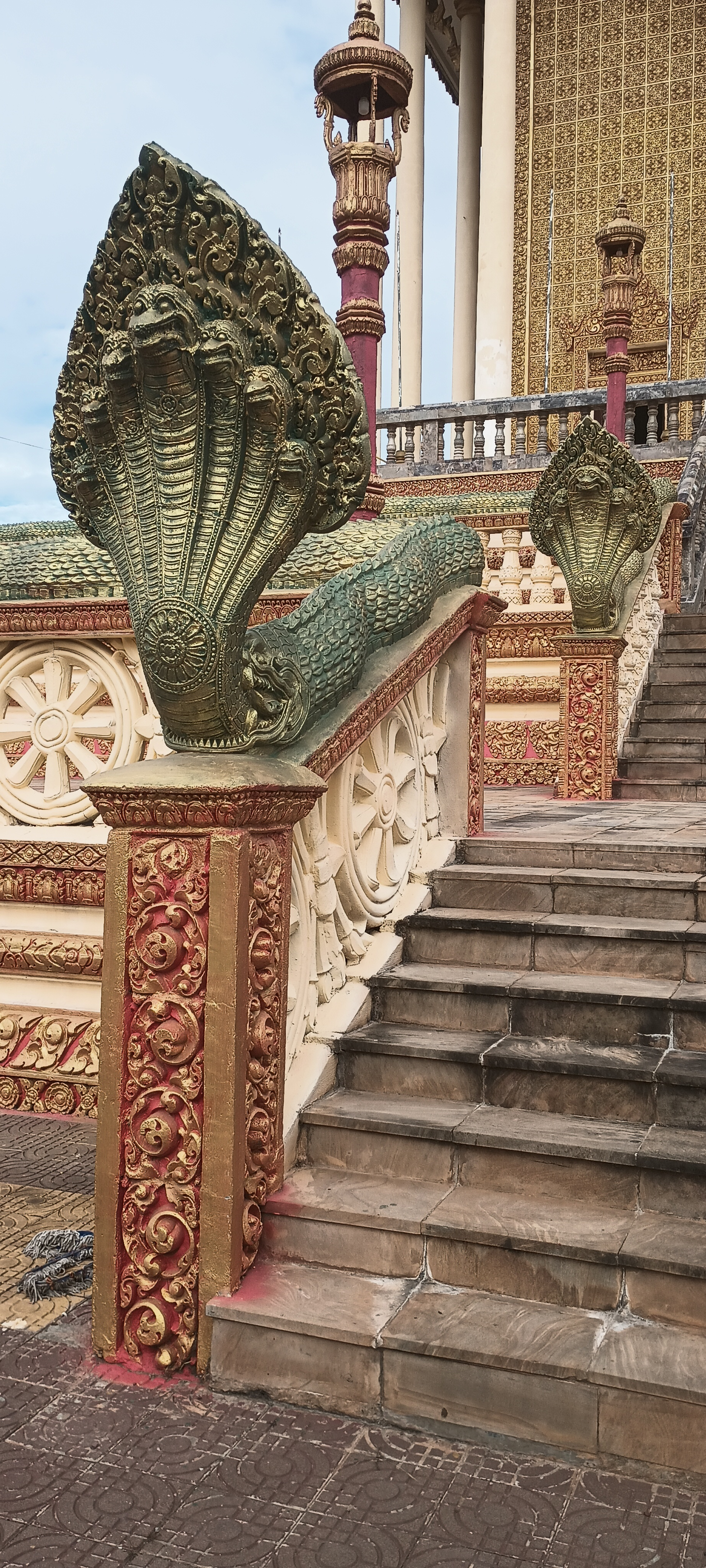
Naga and detail of Prasat Nokor Vimean Sour, Oudong

Oudong was founded by King Srei Soryapor in 1601, after the abandonment of Longvek in 1594. Under the reign of King Ang Duong (1841–1850), he constructed canals, terraces, bridges and erected hundreds of pagodas in this region.

From 1618 until 1866 it was formally called Oudong Meanchey, the royal capital of Cambodia for 250 years. In 1866, it was abandoned by King Norodom, taking his royal court along with him to the current capital, Phnom Penh, a dozen miles downstream from the former capital at Oudong.

During the Cambodian Civil War the town was captured by the Khmer Rouge in March 1974, who marched the citizens into the countryside, as well as executing a large number of prisoners. This proved to be a trial-run for the evacuation of Phnom Penh a year later. The Government retook the town in August the same year, but evidence of atrocities was widely discarded by international journalists.

It was extensively damaged by the Khmer Rouge in 1977, along with the other temples, monuments and religious structures there.

== Folklore ==
Legend has it that in the Arthaross Temple (Temple of Eighteen Points, from Pali: अट्ठारस aṭṭhārasa, eighteen), the Buddha located here faces north instead of the traditional direction of east, symbolizing a testimony to the strength and power of the ancient Khmer kingdom.

Henri Mouhot: "Travels in the Central Parts of Indo-China" 1864:

"Udong, the present capital of Cambodia, is situated north-east of Komput, and is four miles and a half from that arm of the Mekon which forms the great lake...Every moment I met mandarins, either borne in litters or on foot, followed by a crowd of slaves carrying various articles; some, yellow or scarlet parasols, more or less large according to the rank of the person; others, boxes with betel. I also encountered horsemen, mounted on pretty, spirited little animals, richly caparisoned and covered with bells, ambling along, while a troop of attendants, covered with dust and sweltering with heat, ran after them. Light carts, drawn by a couple of small oxen, trotting along rapidly and noisily, were here and there to be seen. Occasionally a large elephant passed majestically by. On this side were numerous processions to the pagoda, marching to the sound of music; there, again, was a band of ecclesiastics in single file, seeking alms, draped in their yellow cloaks, and with the holy vessels on their backs....The entire population numbers about 12,000 souls."

== World Heritage Status ==
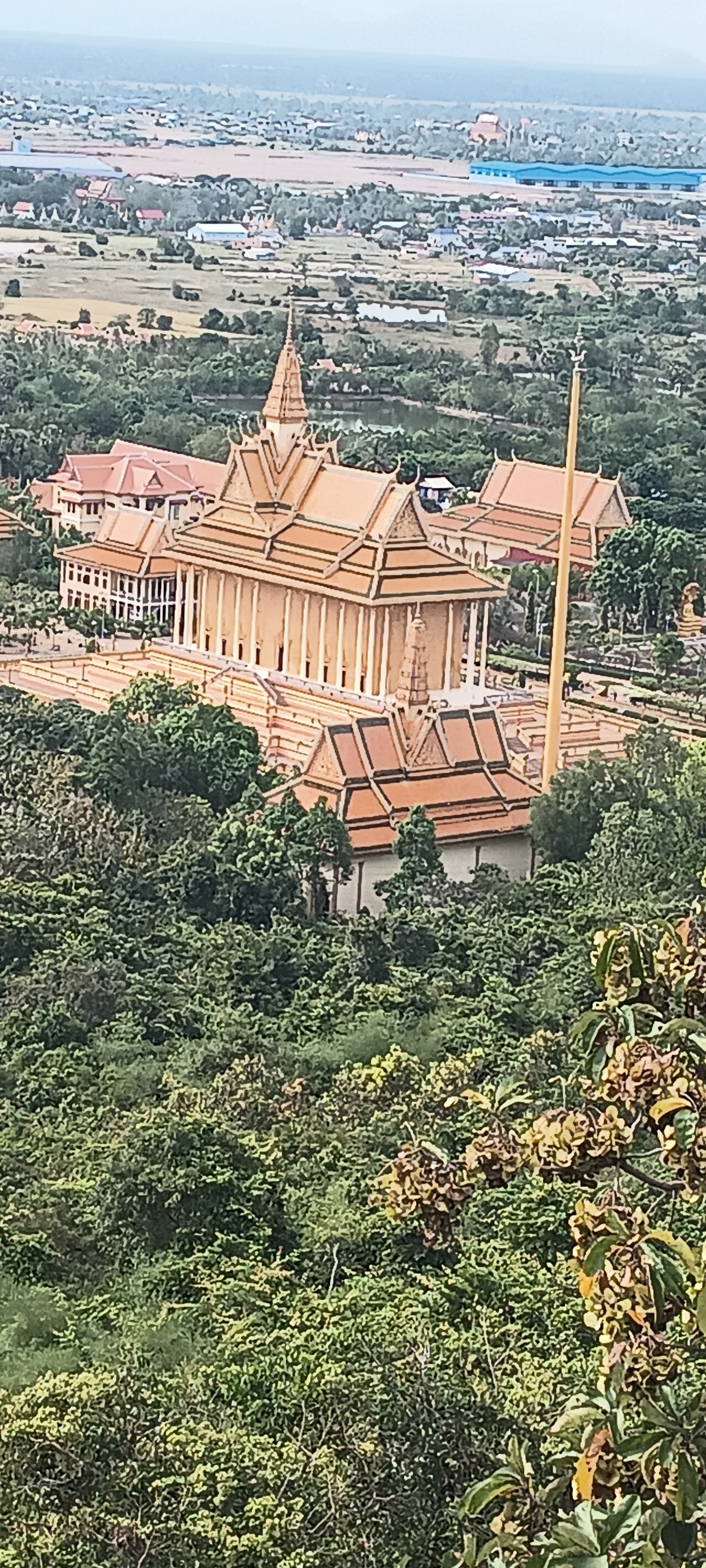
Prasat Nokor Vimean Sour from atop Phnom Oudong

This site was originally added to the UNESCO World Heritage Tentative List on 1 September 1992, in the Cultural category. The submission has been renewed on 27 March 2020.

== Notable people ==
- Ang Duong - King of Cambodia from 1848 to his death in 1860

== See also ==
- Post-Angkor period
- History of Cambodia

== Sources ==
- "The Rough Guide Southeast Asia" Rough Guides, 2002 ISBN 1-85828-893-2
