= Siamese–Vietnamese War (1833–1834) =

Early 19th-century conflict between Siam and Vietnam

- Part of Siamese–Vietnamese Wars and Vietnamese invasions of Cambodia
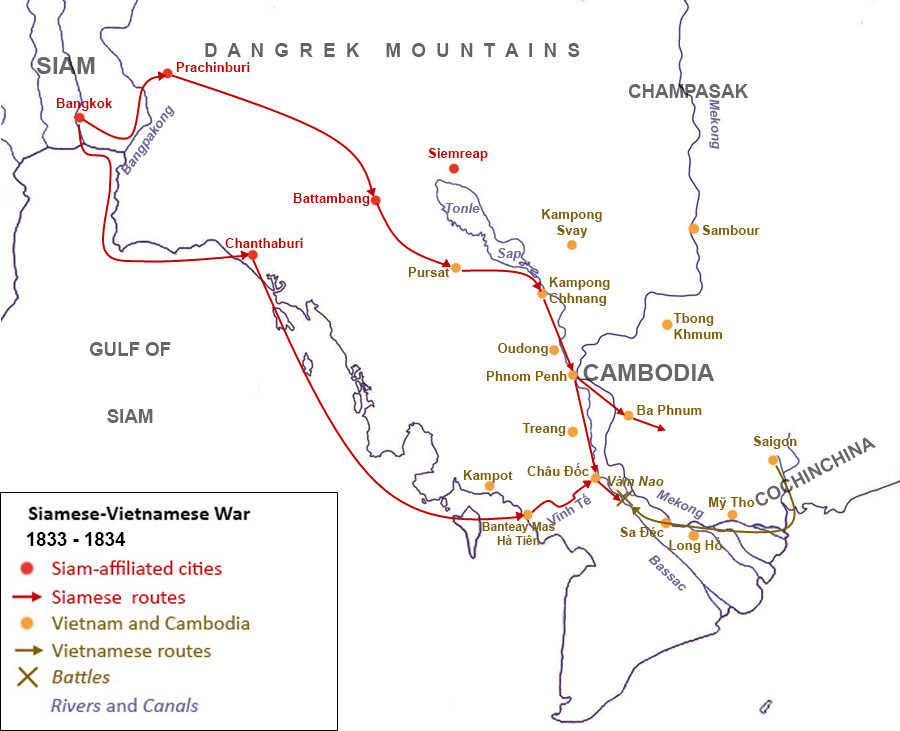
- Red represents Siamese army routes. Yellow represents Vietnam and Cambodia.
Date	23 November 1833 – April 1834
Location	Cambodia, Southern Vietnam
Result	Vietnamese victory
Territorial changes	Vietnam annexes eastern Cambodia (Tây Thành Province) into its territory.

Belligerents
Nguyen dynasty (Vietnam)	Rattanakosin Kingdom (Siam)

Commanders and leaders
Emperor Minh Mạng; Tống Phước Lương; Lê Đại Cương; Nguyễn Văn Xuân; Trương Minh Giảng; Lê Văn Thụy; Phạm Văn Điển; Trương Phúc Đĩnh	King Rama III; Chaophraya Bodindecha; Chaophraya Phraklang Dit Bunnag; Phra Mahathep Pom; Phra Ratchawarin Kham

Units involved
Vietnamese Army	Siamese Army

Strength
~13,000 troops ~35–40 warships	~50,000 troops ~100 warships

Casualties and losses
Unknown	Unknown

The Siamese–Vietnamese War of 1833–1834 (Thai: อานามสยามยุทธ (พ.ศ. 2376 – พ.ศ. 2377), Vietnamese: Chiến tranh Việt–Xiêm (1833–1834)), was a part of centuries-long conflict between Siam and Vietnam for suzerainty over Post-Angkor Cambodia. After the Siamese–Vietnamese conflict over Cambodia during 1811–1813, Cambodia shifted from being under Siamese domination to the period of Vietnamese influence. Though losing Cambodia, Siam had always entertained the idea of retaking Cambodia. In the early nineteenth century, both Siam and Vietnam were politically and militarily powerful in the region, with Laos and Cambodia sandwiched in the middle, shifting alliances and submissions between these two hegemons.

Instability in Southern Vietnam, namely the Lê Văn Khôi Rebellion at Saigon in 1833, allowed Siam to reassert its power over Cambodia. In November 1833, King Rama III of Siamese Rattanakosin Kingdom sent Siamese armies of 40,000 men under Chaophraya Bodindecha to attack Cambodia by land and 10,000 men under Chaophraya Phrakhlang Dit Bunnag to attack Hà Tiên by sea. Siam's goal was to install its sponsored candidates the Cambodian princes Ang Em and Ang Duong to the Cambodian throne against the pro-Vietnamese incumbent king Ang Chan and also to conquer Saigon, perhaps also to assist the Lê Văn Khôi rebels at Saigon. This Siamese invasion came as a surprise for Vietnam, who was occupied with the rebellion at Saigon. Emperor Minh Mạng of Vietnam's Nguyen dynasty had to rely on the forces, generals and commanders he had earlier mobilized against the rebels to defend Southern Vietnam from the Siamese in hurry.

After sweeping through Cambodia and Hà Tiên, the two Siamese commanders Bodindecha and Phrakhlang Dit Bunnag converged at Châu Đốc and proceeded downstream the Bassac River. In order to reach Saigon, the Siamese fleet had to cross from Bassac River to Mekong River at Vàm Nao canal or Thuận Cảng River, which was a choke point. Nguyễn Xuân and Trương Minh Giảng, who were fighting with the rebels at Saigon, were sent from Saigon to deal with the invading Siamese, leading to the climactic Battle of Vàm Nao in January 1834, during which the Vietnamese prevailed over the Siamese, who were utterly defeated and had to retreat back to Cambodia. After the victory at Vàm Nao, Nguyễn Xuân and Trương Minh Giảng pursued the retreating Siamese deep into Cambodia. During the Siamese retreat, the Cambodians, in anti-Siamese sentiments, arose, further inflicting damages and casualties onto the Siamese. By April 1834, the Siamese had all retreated, with Bodindecha retreating by land to Battambang and Phrakhlang by sea to Chanthaburi.

Vietnamese victory over the Siamese allowed Vietnam to put down the Lê Văn Khôi Rebellion and to annex Cambodia into its direct rule, establishing Trấn Tây Province over Cambodia, with Trương Minh Giảng as the Governor-General, both in 1835. Dissatisfactions of Vietnamese rule eventually drove the Cambodians to arise against Vietnam in 1840, during which Siam took advantage of by invading Cambodia in late 1840, leading to the Siamese–Vietnamese War of 1840–1842.

Even though the main Siam's interest was on the Cambodian front, Siam also sent armies through Laos to attack the Vietnamese-held Muang Phuan in the Northern Front, resulting in forced relocation of the Phuan people from Muang Phuan and Phuthai people from Laos to settle in Siam.

== Background ==
=== Internal and Interstate conflicts in Cambodia, Siam and Vietnam ===
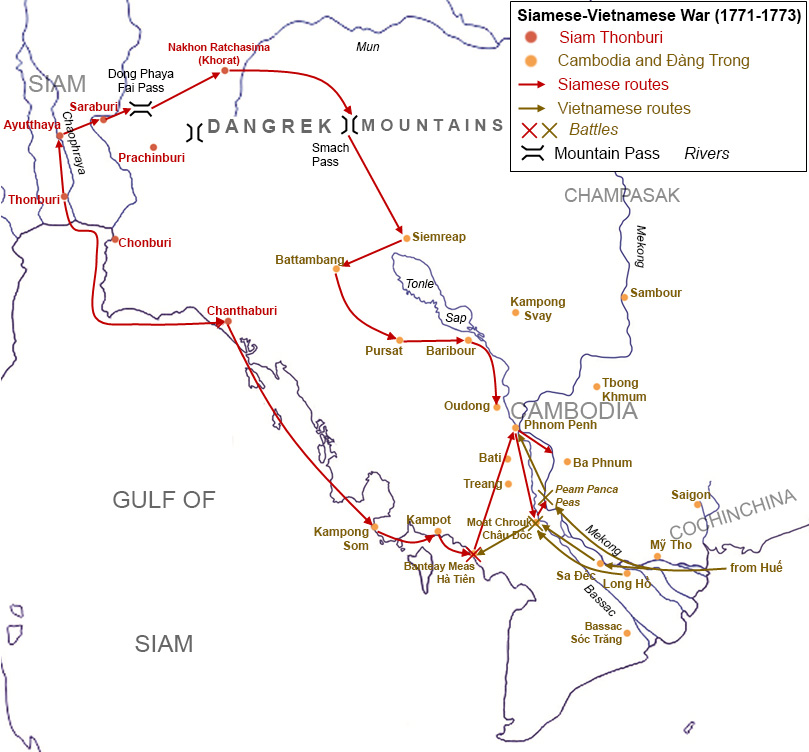
Siamese invasion of Cambodia and Hà Tiên in 1771 and Vietnamese counter-offensives in 1772.

Since the eventual end of Khmer empire in the fifteenth century, post-Angkorian Cambodia had been more or less under aggression by neighboring Siamese Ayutthaya kingdom. In the seventeenth century, Vietnam, led by the Nguyen Lords of Đàng Trong, expanded to the south into Mekong delta of Cochinchina, which had been Cambodian territories, in the process known as Nam tiến. Nguyen Lords exerted influence over Cambodia, bringing them into conflicts with Siam who also sought to control Cambodia. Dynastic factional conflicts in Cambodia aggravated the issue as rival princely candidates usually sought supports from either Siam or Vietnam in their claims to Cambodian throne. In 1771, Siamese King Taksin of Thonburi sent troops to invade Cambodia in efforts to overthrow pro-Vietnamese King Ang Ton of Cambodia and to install his pro-Siamese candidate Ang Non. Siamese invasion did not achieve goal as the Nguyen Lord Nguyễn Phúc Thuần sent Vietnamese forces to repel the Siamese from Cambodia in 1772. Tây Sơn uprising toppled the rule of the Nguyen Lord in Vietnam. With Vietnamese assistance dwindling, Ang Ton decided to reconcile with his rival Ang Non. Ang Ton abdicated in 1775 in favor of Ang Non, who became the new pro-Siamese king of Cambodia. Ang Ton soon died in 1777. Another turn of event occurred in 1778 when Chauvea Tolaha Mou, the Cambodian Prime Minister, rebelled against Ang Non with support from the Nguyen Lord Nguyễn Phúc Ánh, who was fighting the Tây Sơn at the same time. Nguyễn Phúc Ánh sent Vietnamese forces to defeat and kill Ang Non in 1779. Tolaha Mou installed Ang Eng the seven-year-old son of Ang Ton as his puppet king. Taksin was enraged as his pro-Siamese candidate was murdered by the pro-Vietnamese faction. In late 1781, Taksin sent Siamese forces under Chaophraya Chakri into Cambodia. However, a rebellion happened at home in Thonburi, prompting Chakri to broker a peace with Nguyễn Phúc Ánh in order to return to pacify political upheaval in Thonburi in 1782. Chaophraya Chakri assumed power and ascended the throne as King Rama I of Rattanakosin Kingdom, founding the Chakri dynasty of Siam.

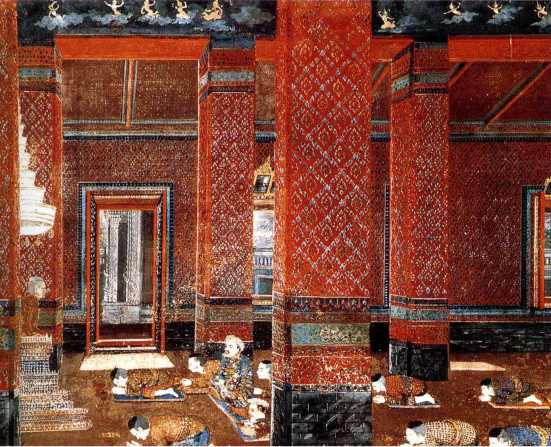
Later imagination of Nguyễn Phúc Ánh taking refuge and being in audience with King Rama I at Bangkok, painting from Amarin Winitchai Throne Hall in Bangkok Grand Palace.

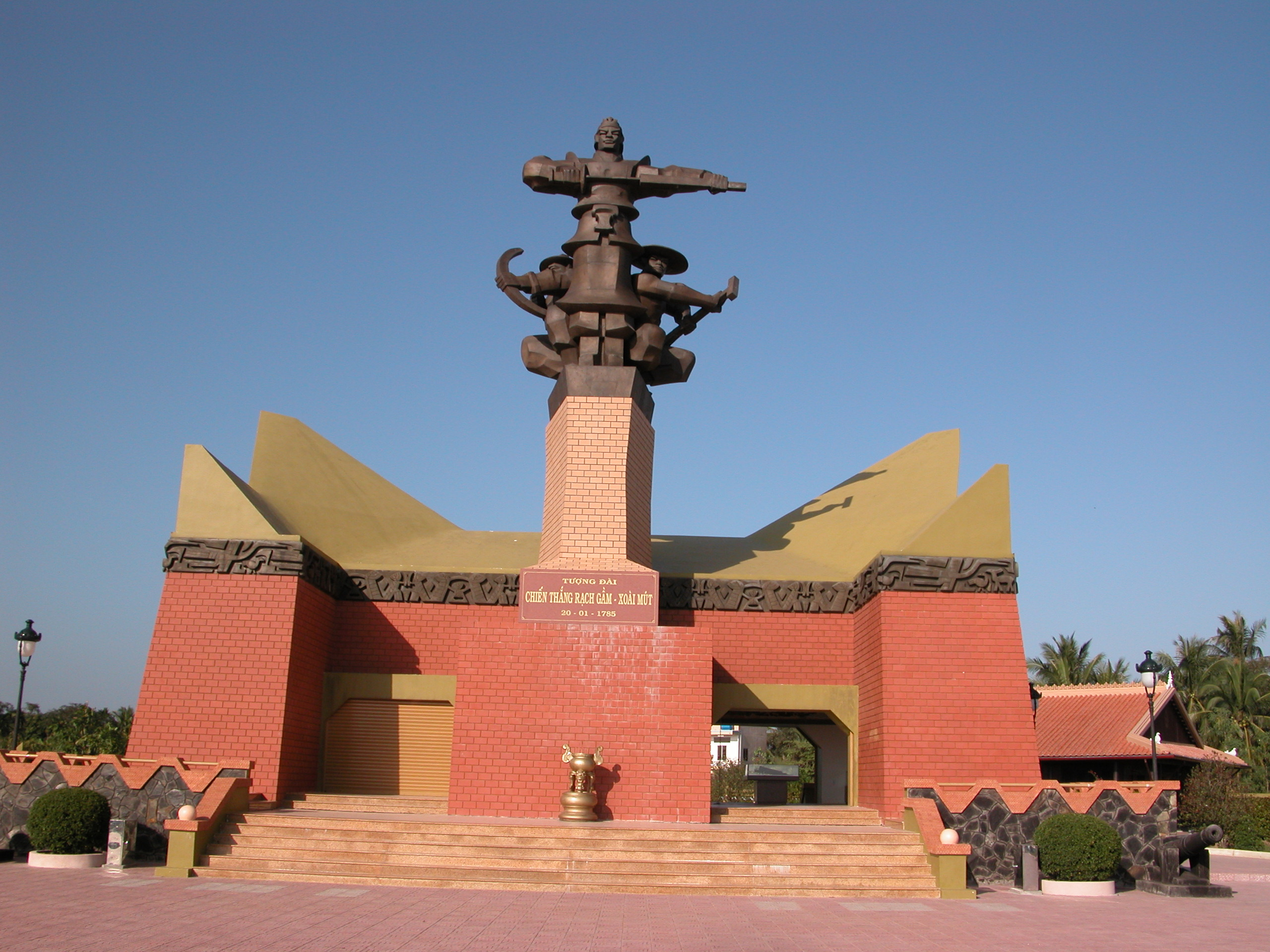
Monument commemorating the Battle of Rạch Gầm-Xoài Mút at Châu Thành, Tiền Giang province.

Nguyễn Phúc Ánh was ousted from his base at Saigon by the Tây Sơn in 1783. Defeated, Nguyễn Phúc Ánh took refuge in Bangkok where he was well-received by the Siamese court, partly due to the preceding peace negotiations in Cambodia in 1782. Also in 1783, Oknha Yumreach Baen, a pro-Siamese Cambodian nobleman, managed to seize power from Tolaha Mou but the ensuing chaos and upheaval in Cambodia obliged Yumreach Bean to take the young king Ang Eng to Bangkok to be under Siamese custody. King Rama I of Siam sent Siamese riparian fleet down the Mekong in 1784 in efforts to restore Nguyễn Phúc Ánh but was utterly defeated by Tây Sơn navy under Nguyễn Huệ in the Battle of Rạch Gầm-Xoài Mút. The Siamese king appointed Yumreach Baen as Chaophraya Aphaiphubet to be prospective head pro-Siamese minister in Cambodia, though Cambodia continued to be technically under Vietnamese domination. In 1787, Nguyễn Phúc Ánh left Bangkok to successfully reconquer Saigon in 1788 and to reclaim his polity from the Tây Sơn with French assistance. According to Thai chronicles, Nguyễn Phúc Ánh sent tributes to Bangkok during his stay in Saigon. In 1790, Aphaiphubet finally defeated the rival pro-Vietnamese faction and took control of Cambodia. In 1794, King Rama I allowed Ang Eng to return to Cambodia to assume personal rule but also carved northwestern Cambodia, including the srok of Battambang and Siemreap, for Aphaiphubet to govern separately under Siamese direct rule. King Ang Eng of Cambodia died prematurely in 1797 with all of his four sons: Ang Chan, Ang Snguon, Ang Em and Ang Duong, were considered by Siamese court to be too young to rule. Nguyễn Phúc Ánh eventually reclaimed and unified Vietnam, proclaiming himself Emperor Gia Long of the Nguyen dynasty in 1802.

=== Siamese–Vietnamese conflicts over Cambodia in 1812–1813 ===
In 1806, Ang Chan the eldest son of Ang Eng, who had been held custody in Bangkok being a young Cambodian prince, was finally crowned as the new king of Cambodia by King Rama I and was allowed to return to Cambodia to rule. However, Ang Chan grew resented of Siamese influence over Cambodia and eventually became pro-Vietnamese. On his coronation, Ang Chan also received recognition state seal from Gia Long and reciprocated with friendly gesture. When Chaophraya Aphiphubet Baen, the Siam-appointed governor of Battambang, died in 1809, another pro-Siamese governor was appointed, upsetting Ang Chan who expected Northwestern Cambodia to be returned to him. Siam-appointed governors of Battambang would be thorn in the side for Ang Chan. Ang Chan did not attend the funeral of Siamese King Rama I in 1809 and sent his younger brothers Prince Ang Snguon and Prince Ang Em to Bangkok in his stead. The new Siamese king Rama II then made Prince Ang Snguon the Uprayorach (viceroy) and Prince Ang Em the Ouparach (deputy viceroy), without consulting Chan, thus making these two princes to form a new pro-Siamese faction in Cambodia. Also in 1809, the Burmese invaded Phuket and King Rama II asked for Ang Chan to contribute forces as vassal kingdoms were expected to provide military assistance. However, Ang Chan ignored this request. Two pro-Siamese Cambodian ministers, Chakrey Pen and Kralahom Muong, acted on their own to gather Cambodian forces to be sent to Siam without Ang Chan's consent. Ang Chan considered this action to be a sedition and executed these two officials. The Cambodian court became again polarized into Siamese and Vietnamese factions.

The pro-Siamese prince Ang Snguon eventually rebelled against his pro-Vietnamese brother Ang Chan in 1812. Ang Snguon left the Cambodian royal city of Oudong to gather his pro-Siamese supporters at Pursat. Ang Chan requested military aid from the Vietnamese. Nguyễn Văn Thoại was sent to bring Vietnamese fleet to take defensive position at Longvek against Siamese attacks. Siamese court, in turn, sent Chaophraya Yommaraj Noi to lead an army of 5,000 men into Cambodia in 1812 to support Ang Snguon. Panicked, King Ang Chan, escorted by Nguyễn Văn Thoại, fled from Oudong to take refuge at Saigon where he was accommodated by the Vietnamese. Princes Ang Em and Ang Duong, Chan's younger brothers, chose to join the Siamese side instead and went to join their brother Ang Snguon. Yommaraj Noi, the Siamese commander, took control but found himself unprepared for long-term occupation of Cambodia. Yommaraj Noi then destroyed and burnt down Cambodian cities of Oudong, Phnom Penh and returned to Bangkok with Cambodian princes Ang Snguon, Ang Em and Ang Duong. The Siamese also deported thousands of Cambodians to the Siam-occupied Northwestern Cambodia.

Both Siam and Vietnam avoided direct confrontations during the crisis of 1812–1813. Simultaneously as Siamese army was invading Cambodia, the Siamese court sent a mission to Gia Long at Huế in 1812, explaining that Siamese expedition into Cambodia was of good intention to restore peace while blaming Ang Chan for the troubles at the same time. Gia Long assumed friendly pretension but put the blame on Ang Snguon instead. Through his reign, Gia Long maintained amicable relations towards Siam but geopolitical dilemma would soon cause Siamese–Vietnamese relations to sour. Cambodia moved closer towards Vietnamese domination. Siam was hesitant to actively compete with Vietnam over Cambodia due to prospective Burmese threat was still looming. In 1813, Gia Long assigned Lê Văn Duyệt, who had just been appointed as the governor of Saigon in 1812, to lead the Vietnamese army of 13,000 men to escort Ang Chan back to Cambodia with Siamese representatives as witnesses. Upon seeing the wrecked ruins of his royal city burnt to the grounds by the Siamese, Ang Chan reportedly cried in tears. Lê Văn Duyệt oversaw military defenses in Cambodia, constructing a new royal citadel for Ang Chan at Phnom Penh called Banteay Keav and another citadel at Lvea Aem. Ang Chan chose to reside at Phnom Penh rather than Oudong owing to its riverside position being accessible to Vietnamese protection navy. Nguyễn Văn Thoại was appointed as bảo hộ or Protector of Cambodia – technically Vietnamese representative minister in Cambodia.

=== Cambodia under Vietnamese domination: 1813–1835 ===
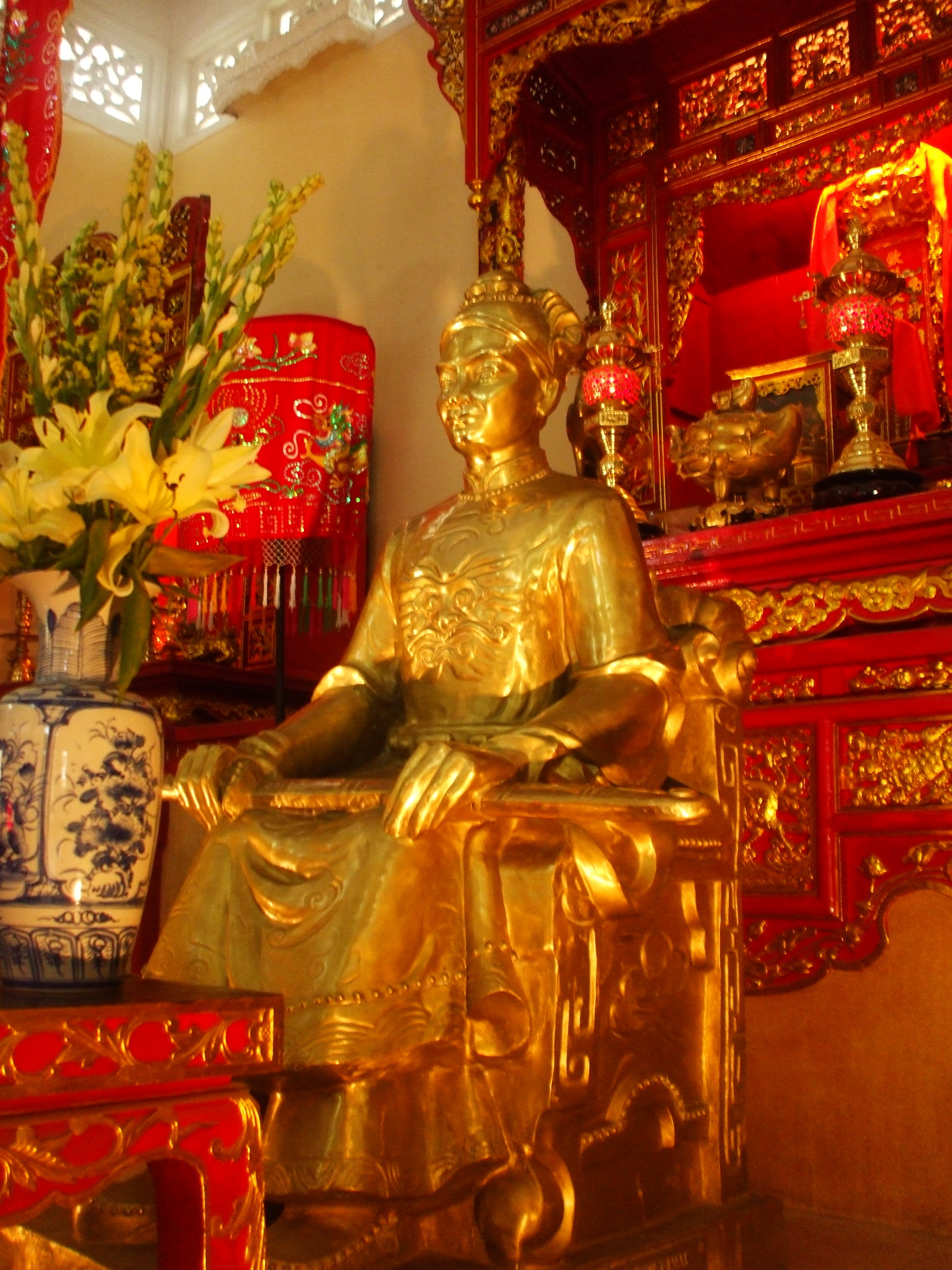
Lê Văn Duyệt was the governor of Saigon and Viceroy of Cochinchina during 1812–1816 and from 1820 to his death in 1832. He held influences over Southern Vietnam and Cambodia.

Lê Văn Duyệt (called Ong Ta Kun in Thai and Cambodian chronicles) was appointed as Tổng trấn Gia Định Thành or governor of Saigon citadel in 1812, which acted as the viceroy of Cochinchina or Southern Vietnam and also had authorities over Cambodia. With appointment of Nguyễn Văn Thoại as bảo hộ Chân Lạp or Protector of Cambodia in 1814, Cambodia became Vietnamese protectorate. Lê Văn Duyệt also built a Vietnamese shrine for Emperor Gia Long at Chroy Changvar, the land opposite of Phnom Penh on the river. Twice a month, Cambodian king Ang Chan, along with his Cambodian officials, would dress in Vietnamese costumes and worship Nguyễn Hữu Cảnh (a Vietnamese commander who conquered Cambodia in 1700) at the shrine. In 1815, at suggestion of Nguyễn Văn Thoại, Ang Chan sent Cambodian forces led by Samdech Chauponhea Tey to attack Battambang and reclaim Northwestern Cambodia from Siam. Samdech Tey, however, was repelled by Ros, the pro-Siamese governor of Battambang who was a son of Aphaiphubet Baen. This incident led to another round of Siamese–Vietnamese diplomatic crisis as Bangkok accused Nguyễn Văn Thoại of instigating this attack. Samdech Tey became the scapegoat as Vietnam put the blame on his belligerent actions and put Samdech Tey under pretensive investigation to please Siam.

In 1819, Gia Long came up with the construction project of Vĩnh Tế canal that would connect Châu Đốc with Hà Tiên. Nguyễn Văn Thoại was put in charge of the project with dedicative participation from King Ang Chan of Cambodia. Both Khmer and Vietnamese people were conscripted to labor works. In 1820, workers arose against Vietnam led by a Cambodian Buddhist monk named Ke, who declared himself a Neak Sel or holy man to rebel against Vietnam. Neak Sel Ke rallied many Khmer followers, establishing himself at Ba Phnum. Ang Chan sent out forces to put down the rebellion, which were defeated. Lê Văn Duyệt sent Nguyễn Văn Trí to lead the Vietnamese forces to eventually defeat and kill Ke. Siam took construction of the Vĩnh Tế canal with great alarm as Siam suspected the canal would facilitate movement of Vietnamese fleets into the Gulf of Siam, directly threatening Bangkok. In response, King Rama II then ordered his son Prince Chetsadabodin to supervise the construction of the Phisuea Samut or Samut Prakarn Fort in 1822 in defense against possible Vietnamese seaborne incursion.

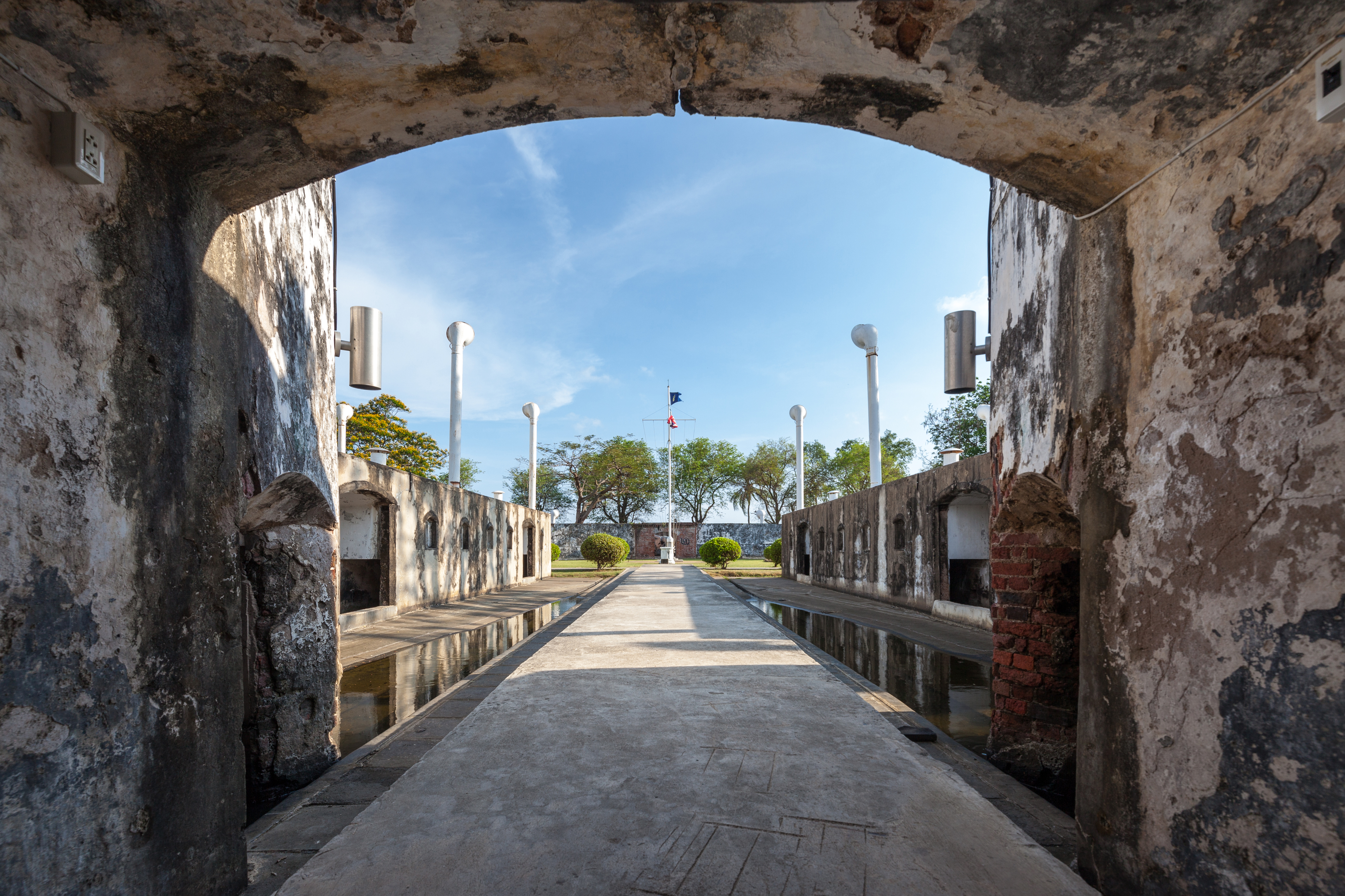
Phisuea Samut Fort in modern Phra Samut Chedi was constructed in 1822, in response to Vietnamese construction of Vĩnh Tế canal, in protection against possible Vietnamese attacks from Gulf of Siam.

Pro-Siamese princes Ang Snguon, Ang Em and Ang Duong, half-brothers of Ang Chan, resided in Wang Chao Khamen or Cambodian quarters in Bangkok established since the times of Ang Eng. Ang Snguon died at Bangkok in 1817, leaving Ang Em and Ang Duong as living pro-Siamese candidates. Neak Neang Tep, daughter of Chaophraya Aphaiphubet Baen the Siam-appointed governor of Battambang who died in 1809, was one of the consorts of King Ang Chan and bore him a daughter named Princess Ang Pen. Neak Neang Tep and her brother Preah Angkeo Ma represented the remaining pro-Siamese faction in Cambodian court. In 1829, Ang Chan sent Preah Angkeo Ma to deliver tributes to Siam – a purely symbolic gesture just to keep Siamese aggression at bay. Angkeo Ma, however, secretly handed a letter to King Rama III or King Nangklao of Siam, urging the Siamese king to attack Cambodia to topple Vietnamese influence. Siam was still unresponsive but Angkeo Ma's confidential maneuver was exposed to the Vietnamese. The Vietnamese ordered the arrest of Angkeo Ma but he fled to Siam. Also in 1832, Oknha Surkealok Kas the chauvay srok or governor of Pursat, who was pro-Siamese, rebelled against Ang Chan and fled to Siam with majority of Cambodian population in Pursat.

=== Anouvong's Lao rebellion ===
In the eighteenth century, the Lao Kingdom of Lanxang fragmented into three separate kingdoms of Luang Prabang, Vientiane and Champasak, with Muang Phuan, another polity, under periodic Vietnamese control. In 1778–1779, Siamese invading armies conquered all three Lao kingdoms to become tributary states under Siamese domination. Royal family of Vientiane, including the young prince Anouvong, were taken to Bangkok as hostages. Anouvong grew up in Siamese court and was allowed to return to Vientiane as a prince in 1795, becoming the King of Vientiane himself in 1805. Prince Anouvong took Muang Phuan by force in 1799, forcing the ruler of Muang Phuan to accept the authority of Vientiane but, through arrangements by Gia Long in 1802, Muang Phuan was given to Luang Prabang. However, Anouvong again sought to dethrone Chao Noy the ruler of Muang Phuan, who was married to a female relative of Anouvong. Chao Noy eventually accepted Anouvong's authority but, at the same, pleaded for Vietnamese aid and held grudges against Anouvong.

In 1824, King Rama II of Siam died and Anouvong traveled to Bangkok to attend the royal funeral but faced derogatory treatment. Also in 1824, the Siamese court ordered the Sak Lek or conscription tattooing in Laos, an unprecedented policy that oppressed Lao people and disregarded Anouvong's authorities. Given the wrong impression that the British would attack Bangkok, Anouvong took this false opportunity to march his Lao armies in 1826–1827 to stop the Sak Lek and to threaten Bangkok, seizing Nakhon Ratchasima and Saraburi. Anouvong, however, was repelled by Siamese counter-offensive forces. With defeat imminent, Anouvong fled from Vientiane to Vietnamese Nghệ An Province, seeking protection under Vietnam. Lê Văn Duyệt suggested belligerent retaliation against Siam but Minh Mạng preferred peaceful means. Minh Mạng sent Phan Văn Thúy to escort Anouvong back to Vientiane in 1828 to negotiate with Siamese officials there. According to Thai chronicles, the Vietnamese envoy spoke: "Siam is like the father. Vietnam is like the mother. When the father is angry over the child. The mother should bring the child to apologize." Anouvong, however, unexpectedly arose and killed the unprepared Siamese officials in Vientiane. With situation spiraled out of hand, Minh Mạng sent another Vietnamese mission to Nakhon Phanom to propose peace terms. Chaophraya Ratchasuphawadi (later Chaophraya Bodindecha) the Siamese commander, however, was convinced that Vietnam was behind this deadly ambush on the Siamese at Vientiane. Ratchasuphawadi ordered the massacre of Vietnamese envoys at Nakhon Phanom. Shocked, Minh Mạng sent a mission to Bangkok in 1829 to demand justice for the incident but Bangkok was not cooperative.

==== Vietnamese annexation of Muang Phuan ====
When the Siamese armies invaded Laos in search for Anouvong, Chao Noy the ruler of Muang Phuan asked for Vietnamese protection. Minh Mạng was poised to annex Muang Phuan into Vietnamese rule by transforming Muang Phuan into Trấn Ninh (鎮寧) Province. When Anouvong was defeated again in 1828 and fled to Xiangkhouang, Chao Noy the ruler of Muang Phuan, a former vassal to Anouvong that later became a vassal of Vietnam, revealed the whereabouts of Anouvong to Bodindecha, which led to the capture of Anouvong. Anouvong was eventually captured and encaged, transported as a prisoner to Bangkok in 1828. At Bangkok, Anouvong and his family were subjected to tortures and public humiliation. Anouvong died in early 1829. The kingdom of Vientiane was dissolved as the royal city of Vientiane itself was mostly destroyed and burnt to the grounds. Minh Mạng sent Tạ Quang Cự to occupy Muang Phuan and to assist Chao Noy but soon realized that Chao Noy had switched loyalty to Siam. When Minh Mạng learnt that Chao Noy had cooperated with the Siamese in the downfall of Anouvong, the Vietnamese emperor summoned Chao Noy to Huế for explanation but Chao Noy had become defiant to Vietnam, refusing to go. Tạ Quang Cự then arrested Chao Noy and brought him to Huế, where Chao Noy was executed by slow slicing in 1829 by the orders of Minh Mạng. Muang Phuan–Xiangkhouang then came under direct Vietnamese control as the Trấn Ninh Province. Tạ Quang Cự was appointed as the governor of Nghệ An and Hà Tĩnh – Vietnam's frontline area against Laos-Siam. Minh Mạng also appointed Chao San, a distant relative of Chao Noy, as the puppet ruler of Muang Phuan.

=== Lê Văn Khôi Rebellion ===
Warlord Lê Văn Duyệt held the position of Tổng trấn Gia Định Thành or governor of Saigon and Viceroy of Cochinchina from 1820 to his death in 1832 and, during his tenure, had been the most powerful minister of Southern Vietnam, also holding influence over Cambodia. Under his rule, Lê Văn Duyệt allowed Chinese immigrants to flourish in their trades and Christian Southern Vietnamese to enjoy their religious freedom. He was popular and was the personification of Southern Vietnam itself. This, however, conflicted with Minh Mạng's staunch Confucianist policies. Minh Mạng considered Southern Vietnam to be an unruly autonomous region where illegal opium imports by Chinese immigrants and Christianity were allowed and tolerated. Minh Mạng then sought to dismantle this autonomous regional apparatus. In 1831, Minh Mạng appointed his own officials Nguyễn Văn Quế as governor of Gia Định (Saigon) province as a part of his administrative reforms to reorganize Vietnam into tỉnh or provinces and also appointed Bạch Xuân Nguyên as the attorney of Saigon. Lê Văn Duyệt finally died in 1832 and this gave pretext for Minh Mạng to further undo Lê Văn Duyệt's legacies. The autonomous position of Tổng trấn Gia Định Thành was abolished in favor of centrally-appointed provincial governors. Minh Mạng prohibited Christianity in January 1833 and Western Catholic priests, missionaries and Vietnamese Christians were arrested and persecuted. French priests, including Father Régéreau and Jean-Louis Taberd, fled to Siam. Bạch Xuân Nguyên reported to Minh Mạng at Huế that the recently deceased Lê Văn Duyệt had been corrupted and abusive of his powers. Minh Mạng then instituted posthumous punishments for Lê Văn Duyệt by digging his dead body out of his grave to be canned. Three generations of Lê Văn Duyệt's family were executed and his followers were arrested and punished in large-scale political purge of Southern Vietnam.

Joseph Marchand was found involved in the pro-Christian Lê Văn Khôi rebellion by Nguyen government. He was executed by slow slicing and martyred at Thợ Đúc near Huế in 1835.

Lê Văn Khôi, adopted son of Lê Văn Duyệt, arose in rebellion against Minh Mạng in April 1833. The rebels murdered Minh Mạng's officials including Nguyễn Văn Quế and Bạch Xuân Nguyên the governors of Saigon. Lê Văn Khôi rebels seized control of Saigon and gained a large number of followers in Southern Vietnam, especially the Christians. In 1833, Lê Đại Cương (known in Thai chronicles and Ong Chan Bia) had been holding the position of Tổng đốc or governor of An Giang and Hà Tiên provinces and was also bảo hộ or Protector of Cambodia, Vietnamese head minister in Cambodia. Lê Đại Cương and other commanders attempted to retake Saigon but were utterly defeated by the rebels as Lê Đại Cương himself had to take refuge in Cambodia. Lê Văn Khôi quickly took control of all six Southern Vietnamese provinces including Biên Hòa, Gia Định (Saigon), Định Tường (Mỹ Tho), Vĩnh Long (Long Hồ), An Giang (Châu Đốc) and Hà Tiên. With initial setbacks, Minh Mạng assigned a whole new troupe of commanders led by Tống Phước Lương, including other commanders such as Nguyễn Xuân and Trương Minh Giảng, to put down Lê Văn Khôi's rebellion. Thái Công Triều at Châu Đốc, second-in-command under Lê Văn Khôi, decided to defect upon seeing the might of Nguyen armies, enabling the Nguyen to prevail. Due to the defection of Thái Công Triều, Lê Văn Khôi was obliged to retreat to Saigon. Tống Phước Lương was successful against the rebels, reconquering all of Southern Vietnam for Minh Mạng by late 1833 except for the Saigon citadel itself where Lê Văn Khôi stood.

Nearly defeated, Lê Văn Khôi attempted to enlist Siamese help by sending deputations to Siam but they were unsuccessful as they were intercepted, revealing a letter written by Lê Văn Khôi to Siamese king Rama III to ask for military aid. Perhaps informed by the fleeing French priests, Siam became known about the upheavals in Southern Vietnam. King Rama III was to capitalize this opportunity to dismantle Vietnamese influence in Cambodia and to possibly take control of Southern Vietnam. Siam, by the 1830s, considered Vietnam to be a geopolitical rival rather than an established ally. In the words of Thai chronicles; "When Ong Chan rebelled, Vietnam supported him. When Anou rebelled, Vietnam also supported him and escorted him back to restore. They also do this in Cambodia, restricting Thai territories and boosting themselves as Duc Hoang De." The Siamese king did not like that Vietnamese rulers styled themselves as Hoàng đế or emperors. Rama III initiated the Siamese campaign to bring Prince Ang Em to the Cambodian throne and to take Saigon.

== Preparations ==
=== Siamese preparations ===
King Rama III arranged the Siamese forces into the following routes:

- Chaophraya Bodindecha would lead a land army of 40,000 men to bring Prince Ang Em and Ang Duong to Cambodia and to proceed to take Saigon. Pro-Siamese Cambodian officials Preah Angkeo Ma and Oknha Kas, who had previously taken refuge in Siam also took part in this expedition.
- Chaophraya Phraklang would lead a galley fleet of 10,000 men to attack Hà Tiên and to converge with the land army at Saigon.
- Phra Mahathep Pom and Phra Ratchawarin Kham would attack Xiangkhouang and Nghệ An Province through Khorat Plateau and Laos.

== Southern Front: Cambodia and Cochinchina ==
=== Siamese invasion of Cambodia ===
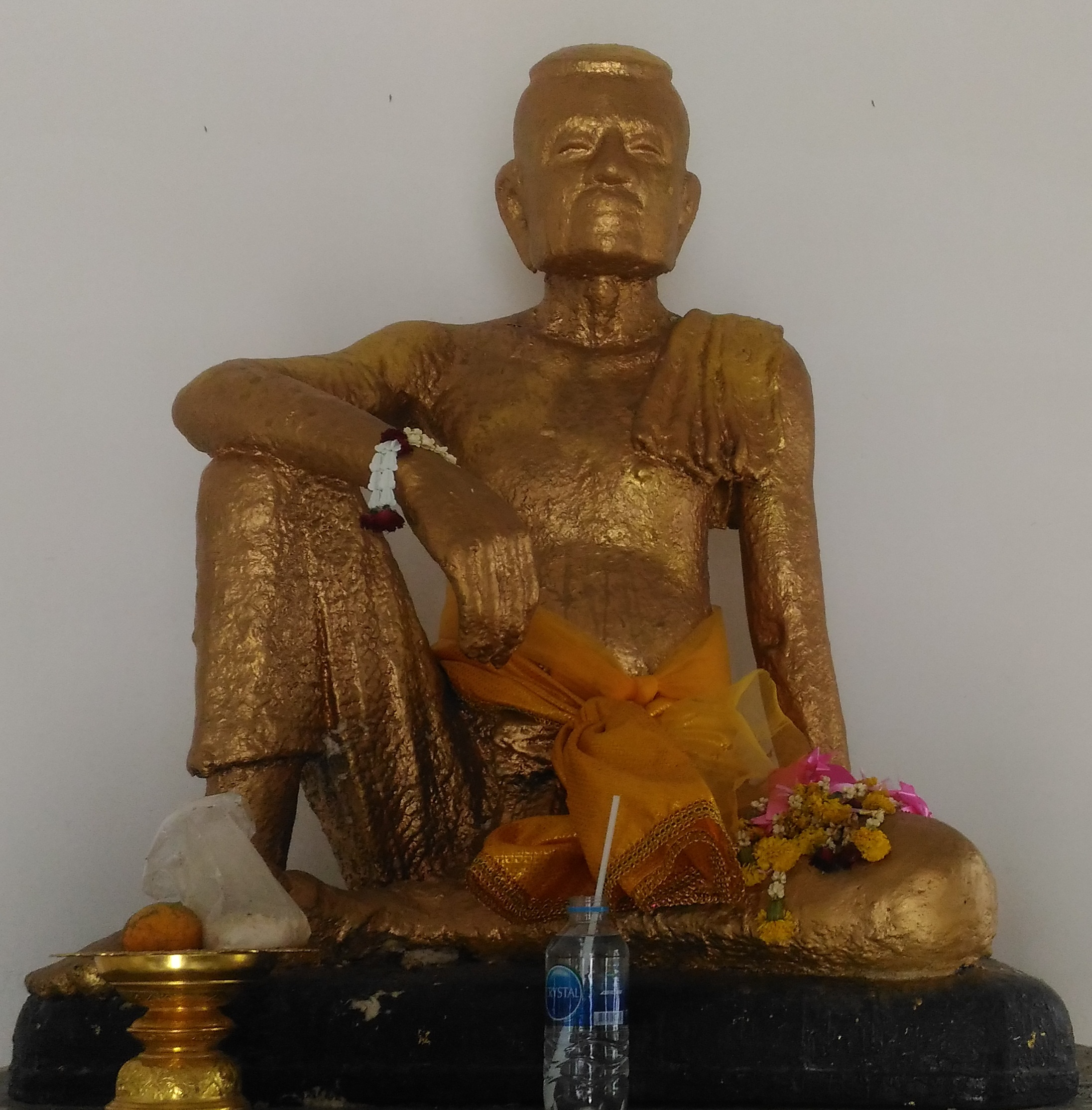
Chaophraya Bodindecha, the Siamese commander-in-chief

King Nangklao or King Rama III sent Siamese forces to invade Cambodia by land and sea in order to topple Vietnamese influence in Cambodia, installing the pro-Siamese candidates Ang Em and Ang Duong on the Cambodian throne, bringing Cambodia into Siamese domination. If succeeded, the Siamese forces were to continue to invade Southern Vietnam to support the Lê Văn Khôi rebels in the Mekong delta. If failed, the Siamese commanders were to depopulate Cambodia by "turning Cambodia into a forest", enforcing the deportation of Cambodian people into Siam, to prevent Vietnam from utilizing Cambodia as a geopolitical threat to Siam.

All three Siamese divisions left Bangkok on the same day on November 23, 1833. Pro-Siamese Cambodian figures, including Preah Angkeo Ma and Oknha Kas the former governor of Pursat, who had been taking refuge in Siam, also joined the main Siamese land division under Chaophraya Bodindecha. King Ang Chan of Cambodia, upon hearing news of Siamese invasion, assigned Oknha Chakrey Long to organize Cambodian forces to resist the Siamese. However, Chakrey Long was able to muster a troop of only 300 men in short period of time. The main column of Chaophraya Bodindecha, led by shock troops with a great number of war elephants, marched from Battambang to seize Pursat. Oknha Chakrey Long led the Cambodian army against Siamese vanguard forces of 5,000 men in the Battle of Kampong Chhnang in December 1833. Chakrey Long was defeated and fled to Ba Phnum. A great number of Cambodian people, frightened on the sight of Siamese invading armies, simply fled and took refuge in the jungles.

After the defeat of Chakrey Long, King Ang Chan and his court fled from Phnom Penh under Siamese treat on December 31 to Cochinchina. Ang Chan presumably intended for Saigon as he had previously done in 1812, some twenty years ago but Saigon was then occupied by the Lê Văn Khôi rebels so Ang Chan instead ended up in Long Hồ, in Vĩnh Long Province. Bodindecha then marched his armies through Cambodia without further resistances. Chaophraya Bodindecha left Princes Ang Em and Ang Duong to take control in Phnom Penh with himself proceeding to Ba Phnum.

=== Siamese invasion of Southern Vietnam ===
The Siamese navy division of Phraklang reached Hà Tiên in January 1834. The Vietnamese, who had been preoccupied with Lê Văn Khôi's rebellion, were caught unprepared, and the Siamese quickly took Hà Tiên. Phraklang then sailed his fleet upstream the Vĩnh Tế Canal and also quickly took Châu Đốc in the An Giang Province. Bodindecha, who had reached Ba Phnum, sent his brother-in-law Chaophraya Nakhon Ratchasima to bring 7,000 men eastwards through Ba Phnum district directly to Saigon, while Bodindecha himself joined Phrakhlang at Châu Đốc.

Vietnam had to divert its forces from the Saigon rebel front to engage with the invading Siamese. Emperor Minh Mạng then Nguyễn Xuân (known as Ong Tham Tai, for his position as Tham tán Đại thần) and Trương Minh Giảng to counter the Siamese offensives in An Giang.

==== Battle of Vàm Nao ====
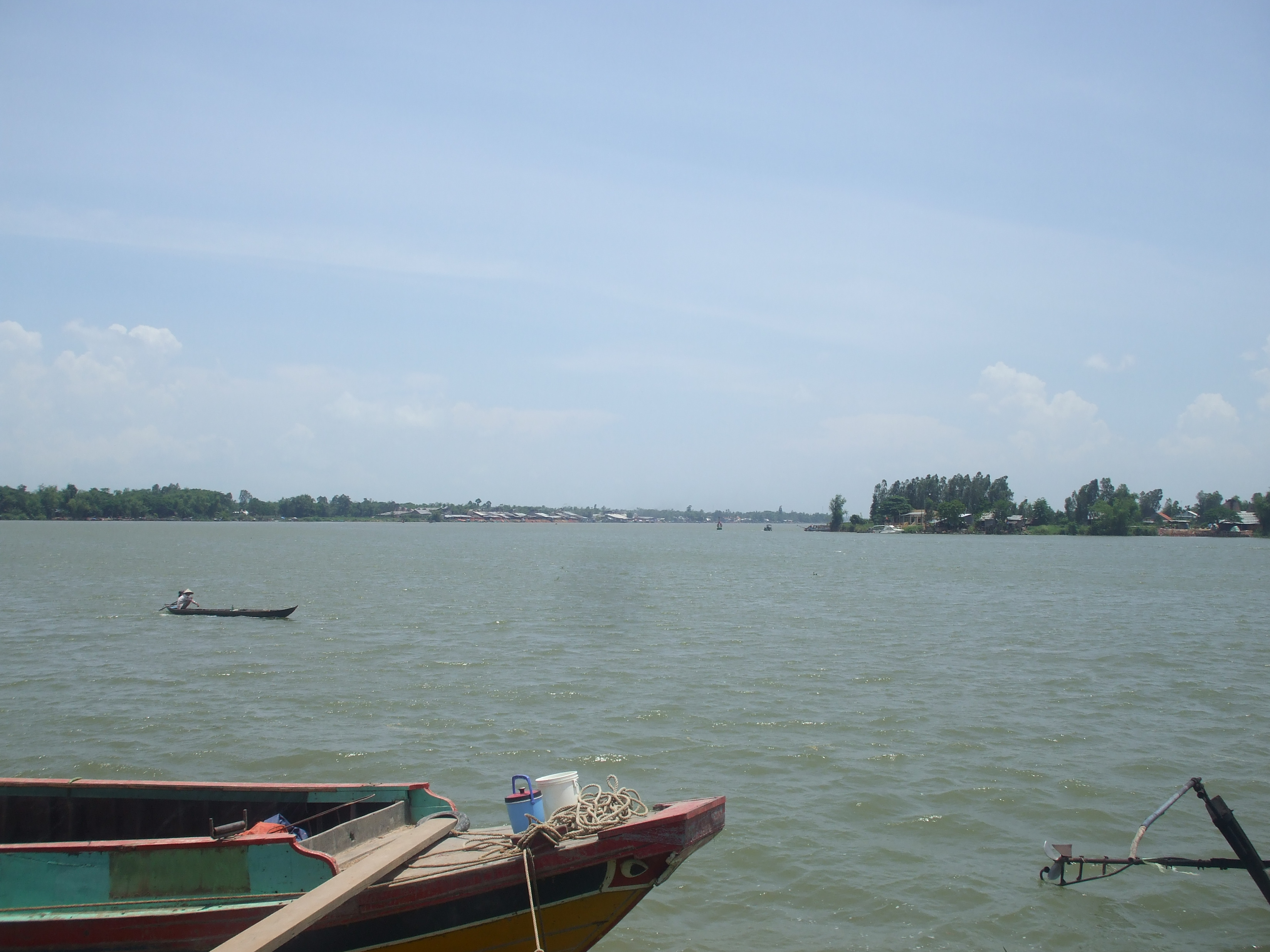
The modern Vàm Nao River in An Giang Province, where the battle of January 1834 took place.

To reach Saigon from Châu Đốc, the Siamese fleet had to cross from the Bassac River to the Mekong via the Vàm Nao Canal. Chaophraya Bodindecha merged his army into Phraklang's fleet and the massive Siamese fleet proceeded along the Bassac River and reached the Vàm Nao Canal or Thuận Cảng Canal on January 21, 1834, where they met the Vietnamese fleet under the command of Nguyễn Xuân. The Battle of Vàm Nao ensued and continued for ten days. The Siamese initially prevailed. The Vietnamese retreated towards the Mekong, constructing a barrier to block the river.

The stalemate existed for seven days until 29 January when the Siamese attacked the Vietnamese riparian barrier, with Bodindecha attacking on land and Phrakhlang attacking on the river. The admirals of Phraklang's fleet, however, refused to engage with the Vietnamese fleet. Phraklang himself had to board a small boat to encourage his admirals to attack but to no avail. Vietnamese officer Phạm Hữu Tâm attacked Bodindecha's Siamese armies. Vietnamese reinforcements, including more than 100 battle junks, led by Tống Phước Lương the Tả tướng quân (Ong Tian Kun) or grand commander of the campaign, arrived and the overwhelming number of the Vietnamese engaged Bodindecha's armies. The Siamese were unable to withstand the Vietnamese, and both Bodindecha and Phraklang decided to retreat on January 31, 1834 or in February 1834.

=== Siamese retreat ===
After the Battle of Vàm Nao, the Siamese retreated to Châu Đốc on February 2, 1834. Vietnamese commanders; Nguyễn Xuân (Ong Tham Tai), Lê Đại Cương (Ong Chan Bia) and Trương Minh Giảng, capitalized on the victory by sending a fleet to follow the Siamese and attack Châu Đốc. Chaophraya Bodindecha ordered the Siamese to fire upon the disembarking Vietnamese, which resulted in bodies piling on the river bank. Phraklang then retreated further to Hà Tiên through the Vĩnh Tế Canal. During the dry season, the water levels in the local waterways were low, impeding the traffic of Siamese riparian fleet. At one point, Chaophraya Phrakhlang had to employ his elephants to tow the boats that were stuck in the mud out to free them. However, the local Cambodians arose, killing Siamese elephant mahouts and took all the elephants.

Facing Vietnamese counter-attacks, Bodindecha decided to retreat his bulk of Siamese forces from Châu Đốc to Treang in Southern Cambodia. In the same time, realizing that this campaign was much done for, Chaophraya Phrakhlang abandoned Hà Tiên and took with him the inhabitants of Hà Tiên, the inhabitants of Southern Cambodian towns of Kampot and Kampong Som, including the Vietnamese Christians from An Giang, back to be resettled in Chanthaburi in Eastern Siam.

Failing in their campaign, the Siamese were to turn Cambodia into forest, deporting over a thousand Khmer people to Siam. As the Vietnamese reconquered Châu Đốc and Hà Tiên, Chaophraya Bodindecha and the Siamese tried to round up as many local Khmer people as captives as he could along his retreat route in order to make up for the loss of the campaign.

Bodindecha instructed Princes Ang Em and Ang Duong at Phnom Penh to destroy the citadel, burn the city, and march all inhabitants of Phnom Penh, including the Khmers, the Chams and the Chinese to Battambang. The Banteay Keav citadel of Phnom Penh, constructed by Lê Văn Duyệt for King Ang Chan as his capital in 1813, was burnt down and destroyed. The Siamese burnt down the Cambodian royal palace in Phnom Penh, demolished the city ramparts and looted everything they could. Bodindecha and the two Cambodian princes then retreated towards Siam. However, when they reached Kampong Luong just north of Phnom Penh, the inhabitants of Phnom Penh revolted and insurrected, refusing to be forcefully deported to anywhere. Princes Ang Em, Ang Duong and the Siamese were unable to pacify these Phnom Penh inhabitants and they had to go back with what they were left with.

According to Raba Ksatr Pheanday Udai Raja Eng Chant or "History of the Reign of King Outey Reachea Ang Chan", written by Cambodia monk Pich in 1855, the Siamese forces plundered and destroyed Phnom Penh, putting the Cambodian royal capital in catastrophe. As the Banteay Keav citadel of Phnom Penh was reduced to ruins, the Siamese carried off all the 2,000 families of the inhabitants of Phnom Penh, including the Khmers and the Chinese, including children, back with them. However, when they reached Oudong or Kampong Luong just north of Phnom Penh, about a quarter of Phnom Penh captives mutinied and fled into the forests, refusing to be deported to Siam.

Bodindecha, the Siamese supreme commander, was angry at the Cambodians, who took this occasion to inflict guerilla attacks on the retreating Siamese, calling this a "Cambodian treachery". According to Pich, a son of Bodindecha lynched the entire Cambodian town of Samraong Tong to the west of Phnom Penh, killing and capturing all 1,000 Khmer men of the town, leaving only women.

On February 15, from Treang, Bodindecha forced Oknha Pisnulok the governor of Treang to round up 2,069 Khmer people from the area to go with Bodindecha to Pursat. The retreating Siamese spent time capturing and relocating Khmer people. Bodindecha reached Pursat along with his Khmer captives, joining the pro-Siamese Cambodian princes Ang Em and Ang Duong and fortifying himself there.

=== Battle of Smaong ===
Oknha Chakrey Long the Cambodian commander, who had fled to Ba Phnum, met with Oknha Yumreach Hu, another Cambodian commander who had been organizing local resistance in Southeastern Cambodia, rallying local Khmer irregulars from Ba Phnum, Tbong Khmum, Prey Veng, Rumduol and Romeas Heak to form guerilla forces against the Siamese. Two Cambodian commanders, Chakrey Long and Yumreach Hu, then hold their position at Prey Veng against the Siamese.

Chaophraya Nakhon Ratchasima and Phraya Ratchanikul, who had led the Siamese troops from Ba Phnum to Saigon, were ambushed by the Cambodian resistance force under Oknhas Chakrey Long and Yumreach Ho at Smaong (Phumi Smaong, Svay Antor, Prey Veng province). The two Siamese commanders then realized that the main Siamese forces had already retreated. Siamese commanders Nakhon Ratchasima and Ratchanikul returned to the Mekong but found that all boats to cross the river had vanished and so they cut down some Cambodian wooden houses to build a pontoon bridge to cross. Internal dissent caused Phraya Nakhon Sawan, a Siamese commander, to leave the army group and marched northwards along the Mekong towards Laos, during which they were massacred by the pursuing Cambodians. Chaophraya Nakhon Ratchasima and Phraya Ratchanikul eventually crossed the Mekong retreated towards Kampong Svay.

=== Vietnamese offensives ===
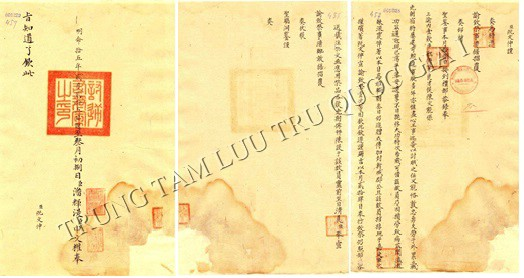
Letter from Saigon Command Staff official Nguyễn Văn Trọng (阮文仲) to Emperor Minh Mạng on the military situation in the Mekong Delta and the death of general Trần Văn Năng (陳文能). April 3, 1834. Vietnamese State Archive.

In February 1834, the Vietnamese generals in Cambodia Trương Minh Giảng and Lê Đại Cương, proposed to Minh Mạng about the defense of Cambodia, An Giang and Hà Tiên provinces;

1. Fortifications should be built in Cambodia, An Giang and Hà Tiên in order to defend against future Siamese attacks
2. More men should be conscripted to garrison on those fortifications
3. Provisions and weapons should always be in storage
4. Reward for the merits and punish the sins of Cambodian officials (Some of them were pro-Siamese, some of them were pro-Vietnamese)
5. Cambodia should not be allowed to contact Siam anymore
6. Cambodia should undergo military reforms in order to strengthen its own defense against Siam

In March 1834, Nguyễn Xuân and Trương Minh Giảng reported back to Minh Mạng that Phi Nhã Chất Tri (Phraya Chakri, referring to Bodindecha) had taken position at Pursat, erecting three stockades. Minh Mạng commands his Vietnamese generals to secure Pursat Kampong Svay which bordered Siamese-held Battambang and Siemreap, respectively, in order to defend Cambodia as a whole. Vietnamese and Cambodian forces under Nguyễn Xuân, Trương Minh Giảng and Oknha Chakrey Long pursued the Siamese deep into Cambodia;

- Nguyễn Xuân pursued the Siamese along the Mekong towards Laos.
- Trương Minh Giảng pursued the Siamese along the southern shore of Tonle Sap lake towards Pursat and Battambang.
- Oknha Chakrey Long pursued the Siamese along the northern shore of Tonle Sap towards Kampong Svay.

In March 1834, Minh Mạng assigned Lê Đại Cương to lead a Vietnamese army of 1,000 men to parade King Ang Chan of Cambodia along with his family and his officials from his refuge at Long Hồ back to Phnom Penh. When arrived at Phnom Penh, Ang Chan reportedly saw the citadel of Banteay Keav, built by Lê Văn Duyệt for Ang Chan in 1813, including his palace, burnt down unrecognizable by the Siamese, wept in tears. Ang Chan then built a temporary palace residence at Po Preah Bat opposite of Phnom Penh on Bassac River, closer to Vietnamese protection.

Chaophraya Bodindecha at Pursat attempted to push back to turn the tide of the war. However, Nguyễn Xuân and Trương Minh Giảng defeated the Siamese again at a certain place called Ca Lăng. Chakrey Long attacked his Siamese enemies Chaophraya Nakhon Ratchasima and Phraya Ratchanikul again near Kampong Svay but was repelled. Bodindecha also tried to locate his lost subordinates Nakhon Ratchasima and Ratchanikul and learned that they had been attacked by the Cambodians. Chaophraya Nakhon Ratchasima already retreated to Phnom Srok, while Phraya Ratchanikul was near Kampong Svay.

Realizing that his efforts to hold out Siamese position in Cambodia was futile and the provisions were dwindling, Chaophraya Bodindecha decided to abandon Pursat and retreat to Siamese-held Battambang, deporting all of the accumulated Khmer captives from various towns and from Pursat all to Battambang. Chaophraya Bodindecha ordered Chaophraya Nakhon Ratchasima and Phraya Ratchanikul to retreat to Nakhon Ratchasima, while also capturing local Khmer population from Kampong Svay and Stoung, crossing the Dangrek Mountains to be resettled in Nakhon Ratchasima, Surin and Sankha in Northeastern Siam. By April 1834, the Vietnamese and the Cambodians were in control of Pursat, thus ending this ill-fated Siamese expedition into Cambodia and Southern Vietnam.

King Ang Chan awarded his meritorious Cambodian ministers Oknha Chakrey Long with the position of Chauvea Tolaha or Prime Minister and Oknha Yumreach Hu with the position of Samdach Chauponhea or Deputy Prime Minister for their dedicated resistance against the Siamese invasion.

=== Analysis ===
Factors contributing to Siam's failure and defeat in this campaign and Vietnamese defensive victory included;

- The Siamese operated far form their base at Battambang with limited food supplies. The Siamese had been struggling to conduct offensives into the Mekong Delta region of Southern Vietnam. Their two previous attempts in 1771 and 1785 and their future attempt in 1842 all ended in defeat as the Vietnamese manage to block, outmaneuver and attack the incoming Siam's riparian fleets at choke points.
- The Siamese tried to capitalize the unstable situation in Southern Vietnam to invade. The Vietnamese were obliged to concentrate their forces to quell the Lê Văn Khôi Rebellion at Saigon as the Siamese invasion came as a surprise. However, by the time the Siamese arrived in the Mekong Delta, the Nguyen forces had already subdued much of the Lê Văn Khôi rebels in Southern Vietnam, constricting the rebellion to only in Saigon, enabling Minh Mạng to allocate Vietnamese forces to counter the Siamese invasion.
- Sentiments of Khmer people; Cambodia had been under Vietnamese influence since 1813. Despite some upheavals in 1820, Cambodia was relatively pacified. The Cambodians were unable to withstand the invasion of massive Siamese armies in late 1833. The two Cambodian Oknhas Chakrey Long and Yomreach Hu rallied Khmer people to rise against the Siamese. Bodindecha placed the Cambodian princes Ang Em and Ang Duong in Phnom Penh in order to rally supports from Khmer people. However, these two pro-Siamese candidates failed to produce positive reception as the Cambodians remained mostly loyal to Ang Chan and the pro-Vietnamese clique. Siamese attempt to conduct scorched earth destruction caused the Cambodians to rise up and attack the disarrayed retreating Siamese. Decision of Ang Em and Ang Duong to destroy the city and deport the inhabitants of Phnom Penh also damaged their reputation. When the Vietnamese forces came to Cambodia, the Cambodians cooperated well with the Vietnamese to pursue the Siamese.
- The Siamese had communication and logistic difficulties in Cambodia. When Chaophraya Bodindecha sent off Chaophraya Nakhon Ratchasima to march by land towards Ba Phnum, expecting to converge themselves at Saigon, these two columns of Siamese armies did not communicate. When the main Siamese forces of Bodindecha and Phrakhlang were defeated at Vàm Nao, Nakhon Ratchasima was unaware of the change of situation, resulting in the Cambodian ambush on his armies at Smaong. Meanwhile, the Vietnamese Emperor Minh Mạng at Huế was kept well-informed about all movements in Southern Vietnam. In dry season, the waterways in the Mekong Delta were in low level, impeding the passages of the riparian fleet of Phrakhlang. During Siamese retreat, it took Bodindecha some time to locate Chaophraya Nakhon Ratchasima and his armies that were scattering across Northern Cambodia.

== Northern Front: Laos and Muang Phuan ==
Phra Mahathep Pom and Phra Ratchawarin Kham reached their respective destinations in January 1834. Phra Mahathep Pom stationed at Nakhon Phanom and Phra Ratchawarin Kham at Nongkhai. Phra Mahathep Pom led a Siamese army to attack the Lao city of Mahaxay, which had been under Vietnamese rule. He then proceeded to attack Phu Thai communities of modern Savannakhet Province including Muang Pong, Muang Phalan and Muang Champhone. The Siamese relocated the Phu Thai people to settle in what is now Nakhon Phanom Province and the surrounding areas.

=== Siamese conquest of Muang Phuan ===
After the execution of Chao Noy of Muang Phuan at Huế in 1829, Minh Mạng appointed Chao San, a prince of Phuan royal dynasty, as the new puppet ruler of Muang Phuan under Vietnamese control. Muang Phuan had been under direct Vietnamese governance as the Trấn Ninh province. Phra Ratchawarin Kham and Phra Patumthewa the governor of Nongkhai sent secret messages to Chao San, urging him to defect to the Siamese side. Chao San, disillusioned with Vietnamese rule, decided to join Siamese side. Phra Ratchawarin Kham led the Siamese army to capture Muang Phuan, defeating and massacring the Vietnamese occupying forces there. Vietnamese forces in Muang Phuan was left unsupported as Tạ Quang Cự the governor of the adjacent Nghệ An and Hà Tĩnh provinces was sent away to suppress the rebellion of Nông Văn Vân in the same year.

Muang Phuan, as a tributary state to Siam, was too far from Siamese influence and was difficult to defend. Siam proposed that Muang Phuan and its people should be evacuated in order to avoid Vietnamese retaliation. Chao San the ruler of Muang Phuan agreed to evacuate 4,000 families of his people across the Mekong to the west side. However, they soon learned that Siam had intended to deport them further into Central Siam. Siam dissolved the Kingdom of Muang Phuan altogether. Nearly all of the Phuan people of Muang Phuan were forcibly relocated to Nan, Sukhothai, Uttaradit, and Phitsanulok Provinces, and Muang Phuan was left largely deserted. A recent study in 2015 found that some of the displaced Phuan people eventually reached as far as Banteay Meanchey and Battambang provinces of Cambodia, where they are misidentified as Liao (Lao) instead of Phuan.

== Aftermath and Prelude to 1840–1842 war ==
=== Vietnamese annexation of Cambodia ===
In mid-1834, Trương Minh Giảng petitioned Minh Mạng to annex Cambodia into direct Vietnamese rule. King Ang Chan of Cambodia died in January 1835. Ang Chan left no male heirs but four daughters Ang Pen (Ang Pen's mother was Neak Neang Tep, daughter of Chaophraya Aphaiphubet the pro-Siamese governor of Battambang who had died in 1809.), Ang Mey, Ang Peou and Ang Snguon, all born from different mothers. Ang Chan's pro-Siamese brothers, Princes Ang Em and Ang Duong, were appointed by Siam as governors of Battambang and Mongkolborey, respectively. The Vietnamese built a new citadel called Trấn Tây in Phnom Penh in April 1835 to replace the Banteay Keav citadel, the residence of Ang Chan, destroyed by the invading Siamese, also to serve as the center of Vietnamese administration in Cambodia.

In May 1835, the Vietnamese Emperor Minh Mạng conferred upon the twenty-year-old Princess Ang Mey, second daughter of Ang Chan, the title of Quận chúa (郡主) as Queen regnant of Cambodia, the first and only historical female ruler in Cambodian history, as a puppet ruler without actual power. Minh Mạng passed over Princess Ang Pen the eldest daughter of Ang Chan due to her apparent connection with Siam. Minh Mạng established the Trấn Tây Province (鎮西) or Western Commandery over Cambodia in November 1835 to bring Cambodia under direct Vietnamese rule. Minh Mạng invested Trương Minh Giảng with the title Trấn Tây tướng quân (chữ Hán: 鎮西將軍) as supreme Governor-General of Trấn Tây Cambodia with Lê Đại Cương as Tham tán đại thần (參贊大臣) or counselor. Vietnamese governors and officials were installed in Cambodia and native Cambodian mandarins were left with minimal power.

After repelling Siamese invaders and consolidating rule in Cambodia, the Nguyen imperial court was then able to wrap up the subjugation of Lê Văn Khôi rebels. Lê Văn Khôi died from illness at Saigon in December 1834, leaving the leadership to Nguyễn Văn Trắm. In September 1835, Nguyễn Xuân led the Nguyen forces to successfully recapture Saigon. The rebel leaders, including the French priest Joseph Marchand who was caught among the rebels, were arrested and brought to Huế to be brutally executed. The tomb of Lê Văn Duyệt was destroyed and flattened. Nguyễn Xuân, the leading Vietnamese general who had defeated both the Siamese and the rebels, died in late 1835, leaving Trương Minh Giảng as the main meritorious powerful official in Southern Vietnam. In 1836, Minh Mạng appointed Trương Minh Giảng to be the governor of An Giang and Ha Tien provinces, giving Trương Minh Giảng unparalleled powers in Cambodia and Cochinchina.

=== Siamese recuperation ===
After retreating, Chaophraya Bodindecha and his Siamese forces stayed at Siam-occupied Battambang. King Rama III or King Nangklao made Prince Ang Em the governor of Battambang and Ang Duong the governor of Mongkolborey, giving the Cambodian princes the impression that they ruled at least some parts of Cambodia. ฺBodindecha and Siamese forces left Battambang to return to Bangkok in May 1834. The Siamese were so impressed by the Vietnamese large fort-warships that King Nangklao ordered the construction of eighty Vietnamese-style warships in December 1834.

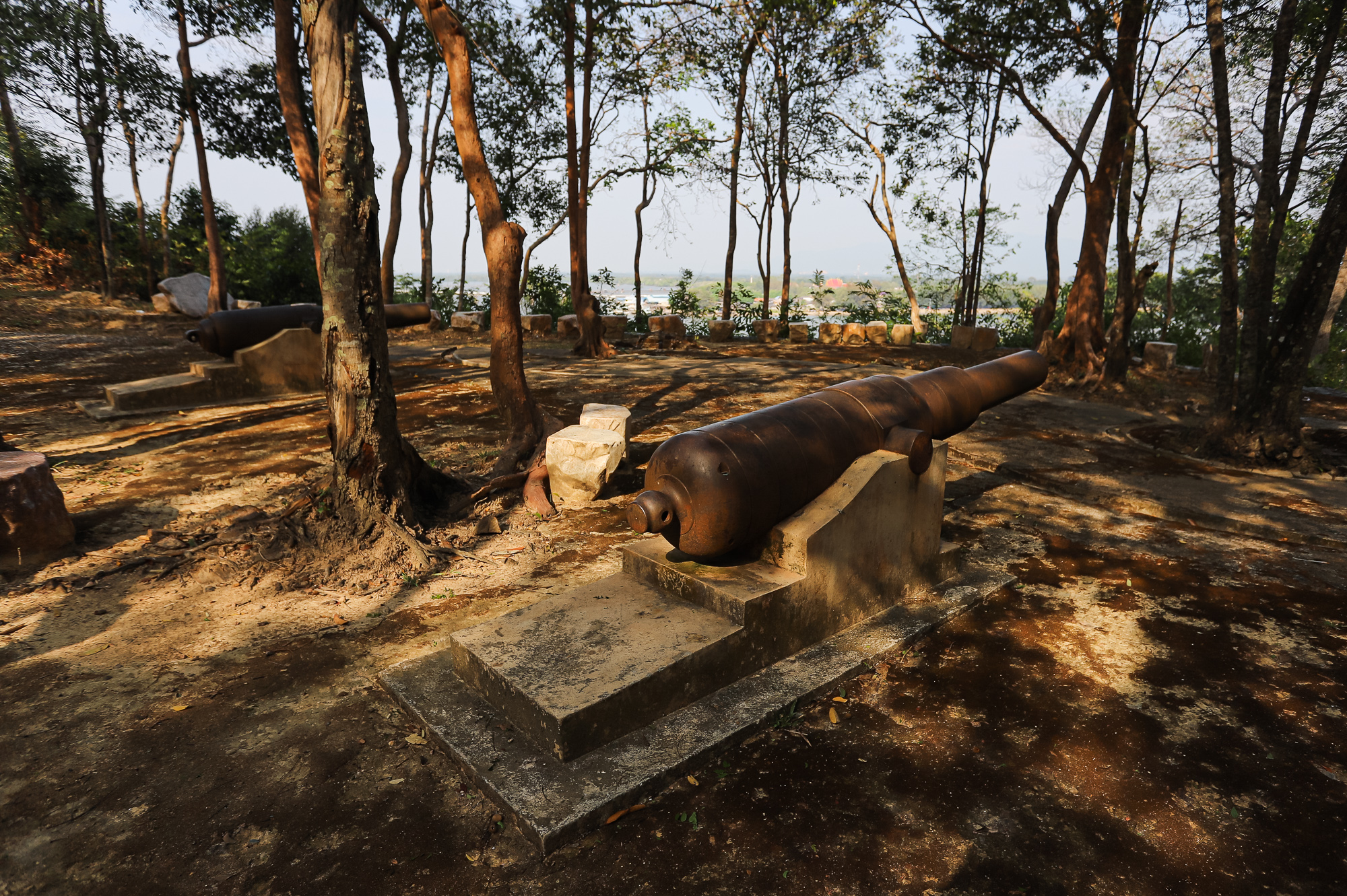
Phairiphinat Fort (Thai: ป้อมไพรีพินาศ) was one of the two forts built by Kham Bunnag at the mouth of Chanthaburi River in 1834 to defend Chanthaburi against possible Vietnamese attacks.

Siam expected full retaliation offensive attacks from Vietnam. Siam fortified its defense against Vietnam, reinforced and prepared itself for future campaigns. In December 1834, King Rama of Siam sent Chaophraya Phrakhlang to fortify Chanthaburi. Phrakhlang moved the city of Chanthaburi five kilometers to the upland position for better defensive site and constructed the Noenwong Fort (Thai: ป้อมเนินวง) there. Phrakhlang assigned his son Kham Bunnag to construct two forts at the mouth of the Chanthaburi River; the Phairiphinat Fort (Thai: ป้อมไพรีพินาศ) and the Phikhat Patchamit Fort (Thai: ป้อมพิฆาตปัจจามิตร). King Rama also ordered the renovation of Chachoengsao city walls and construction of a new fort called Khong Kraphan Fort (Thai: ป้อมคงกระพัน) at Phra Samut Chedi, Samut Prakarn. With the demise of Cambodian king Ang Chan in early 1835 and the advent of Vietnamese rule, a group of Cambodian Oknha nobles sent a secret letter to Bangkok, urging the return of Cambodian princes Ang Em and Ang Duong. Siam had not yet recovered from its losses so the Siamese king sent Phraya Ratchasuphawadi Ng To to establish supply line at Prachinburi and Krabinburi on the way to Cambodia. In 1835, a group Siamese spies were caught near Hà Tiên by Vietnam, prompting a Vietnamese official in Hà Tiên to send a letter to Phrakhlang at Chanthaburi, declaring reconciliatory intentions but was suspiciously viewed as pretension by the Phrakhlang.

Siamese annexation of the Lao kingdom of Vientiane allowed its access to vast manpower resource in the Isan-Laos region. In 1836, King Rama III ordered Chaophraya Bodindecha, Phraya Maha-amat (formerly Phra Mahathep Pom) and Phra Phirenthorathep (formerly Phra Ratchawarin Kham) to conduct a manpower census survey in the Lao and Northern Khmer regions of Khorat Plateau in order to evaluate the available manpower for future military conflicts with Vietnam. Siam sought to strengthen Battambang as its own political base. King Nangklao ordered Bodindecha to fortify Battambang. Chaophraya Bodindecha went to Battambang in February 1837 and moved the Battambang city from Baset to the present-day site on the Sangkae River, constructing a new city-fort there. In February 1839, Phraya Ratchasuphawadi was sent to renovate and fortify the Siemreap town. Battambang and Siemreap were within the Siamese-controlled Northwestern Cambodia.

After finishing his works, Chaophraya Bodindecha returned from Battambang to Bangkok. Absence of Bodindecha in Battambang resulted in a political struggle between the two brotherly Cambodian princes Ang Em and Ang Duong. Trương Minh Giảng the Vietnamese Governor-General of Trấn Tây Cambodia sent a secret letter urging Ang Em to defect to Vietnamese side. Chauvea Tolaha Long the Cambodian Prime Minister also sent a secret letter to Ang Duong, urging Ang Duong to return to Cambodia. Ang Duong then conspired with Phra Phithakbodin Som, an official in Battambang, to seize power in Battambang in November 1838 but Ang Em and Phraya Palat Ros the vice-governor of Battambang informed Bangkok court about this plot first. Ang Duong ended up being put in house arrest in Bangkok. Next year, in December 1839, Ang Em, resenting that the Siamese had failed to put him on the Cambodian throne, rebelled against Siam in Battambang, seizing Phraya Palat Ros his vice-governor, other officials in Battambang and around 6,000 to 8,000 inhabitants of Battambang to defect to the Vietnamese at Pursat. The Vietnamese Emperor Minh Mạng, however, had Ang Em and Phraya Palat Ros arrested and sent to Huế, where Ang Em was imprisoned and Phraya Palat Ros was executed. Other Battambang officials were executed at Trấn Tây citadel in Phnom Penh.

After knowing about the debacle at Battambang, Chaophraya Bodindecha hurriedly left Bangkok, arriving in Battambang in January 1840. Bodindecha assigned Phra Phithakbodin Som, the co-conspirator of Ang Duong's abortive plot, to be the acting governor of Battambang. The defection of Ang Em to Vietnam, bringing manpower and resources of Battambang with him, put the Siam-controlled Northwestern Cambodia in critical condition. Sudden loss of manpower made Battambang vulnerable to Cambodian or Vietnamese attacks, which could happen anytime soon. Battambang had been Siam's corridor against Cambodia. Chaophraya Bodindecha had to rehabilitate Battambang, stockpiling food resources and manpower in Battambang in anticipation of imminent attack. Also, Bodindecha sent levied Lao and Northern Khmer regiments under Siam to guard at Siemreap, Muong Ruessei and Kampong Preah. Minh Mạng did actually command the Cambodians to attack and reclaim Battambang in this state of weakened Siamese defense but Chauvea Tolaha Long refused to comply, saying that the chance of victory was low.

=== Cambodian uprising against Vietnamese rule ===
In 1840, the Vietnamese took a tighter grip on administration of the Trấn Tây province in Cambodia, aiming to integrate Cambodia into Vietnam. In July 1840, Emperor Minh Mạng demoted Ang Mey from 'Queen of Cambodia' to 'Princess of Mỹ Lâm' in the last step to fully annex Cambodia into Vietnam. Three other Khmer princesses were also demoted. In August 1840, Trương Minh Giảng discovered that the pro-Siamese Khmer princess Ang Pen had been in a secret contact with her mother Neak Neang Tep and her uncle Preah Angkeo Ma at Battambang, planning to escape to join her pro-Siamese mother and uncle there. Trương Minh Giảng then had Ang Pen arrested and exiled three other princesses Ang Mey, Ang Peou and Ang Snguon to live in custody in Saigon in Southern Vietnam. Princess Ang Pen was tried for sedition against Vietnam and was eventually executed by drowing at Vĩnh Long in Southern Vietnam in secret, according to Cambodian and Thai chronicles.

Cambodian Oknha nobility were generally upset by the Vietnamese treatment and punishments of their royalty, taking away the Cambodian monarchy. Even though the Cambodian Oknhas had been enjoying high degree of autonomy, their titles and status could only be affirmed and confirmed by Cambodian rulers. Absence of a ruler in Cambodia threatened the status and legitimacy of Oknha nobility and social hierarchy as a whole. Moreover, the Cambodian mandarins anticipated that they too were soon to be gotten rid off by the Vietnamese. In September 1840, the local Cambodian Oknha governors arose against Vietnamese rule in all parts and regions of Cambodia. The Oknha leaders were Oknha Outey Thireach Hing the governor of Samraong Tong, Oknha Vongsa Anchit Mey the governor of Bati, Oknha Reachea Dechea Nong proclaiming himself an Oknha Chakrey in Ba Phnum, Oknha Chet of Baray, Oknha Sena Anchit Mau the governor of Kampot and Oknha Norensena Ten of Eastern Cambodia in the Mekong region. These Oknha clique leaders rallied local Khmer people to lynch the Vietnamese people in their respective regions in anti-Vietnamese sentiments after the six-year rule of the Trấn Tây regime, which they considered oppressive.

Facing intensive and prevalent attacks from the Khmers, the Vietnamese in Cambodia had to retreat into their four strongholds including the Trấn Tây citadel (Phnom Penh), Hải Đông (Kampong Thom), Hải Tây (Pursat) and Sơn Tĩnh (Sambok). Trương Minh Giảng sent out Khmer-Vietnamese forces from Phnom Penh against the rebelling Oknhas but the Vietnamese suffered from the guerilla tactics of the Khmers. The self-proclaimed Oknha Chakrey Nong of Ba Phnum repelled the Trấn Tây forces at Kien Svay. Oknha Chet and Oknha Dechou Ros the governor of Kampong Svay attacked the Vietnamese at Kampong Thom. Oknha Norensena Ten and Oknha Archun Kong the governor of Tbong Khmum attacked the Vietnamese at Sambok on Mekong. Oknha Sena Anchit Mau of Kampot attacked Hà Tiên. Oknha Outey Thireach Hing of Samraong Tong and Oknha Vongsa Anchit Mey of Bati enclosed on the Trấn Tây citadel in Phnom Penh. Oknha Surkealok Muk the governor of Pursat defected to Siamese side, going to submit to Chaophraya Bodindecha at Battambang. In similar fashion to when the Cambodian attacked the retreating Siamese in 1834, the Cambodians avoided facing the Vietnamese in major battles but rather covered themselves in thick forests and ambushed the passing-by enemies.

The Siamese, after their defeat in 1834, had been waiting for a right moment to take control over Cambodia. Oknha Chet, who received support from Siam, sent letters to other rebelling Oknhas to inform them about Siamese support. The Oknhas then separately sent eighteen letters to Chaophraya Bodindecha, urging Siam to support them with weapons and to release the Prince Ang Duong to be their putative leader of this anti-Vietnamese movement.

=== Siamese Invasion of Cambodia (1840) ===
Taking advantage of the general Cambodian uprising against Vietnamese rule in late 1840, Chaophraya Bodindecha the Siamese supreme commander led the Siamese forces to invade Cambodia again in November 1840 to take control of Cambodia, six years after the previous Siamese defeat in 1834. Bodindecha sent Phraya Ratchanikun to bring 13,000 Lao and Northern Khmer ethnic conscripts to march from Siemreap to attack Chikreang and Stoung, in order to attack the Vietnamese headquarter at Kampong Thom. Vietnamese commanders at Stoung and Chikreang were Đoàn Văn Sách and Nguyễn Công Nhàn, respectively. Phraya Ratchanikun seized Chikraeng but the Vietnamese under Đoàn Văn Sách and Nguyễn Công Nhàn held out at Stoung.

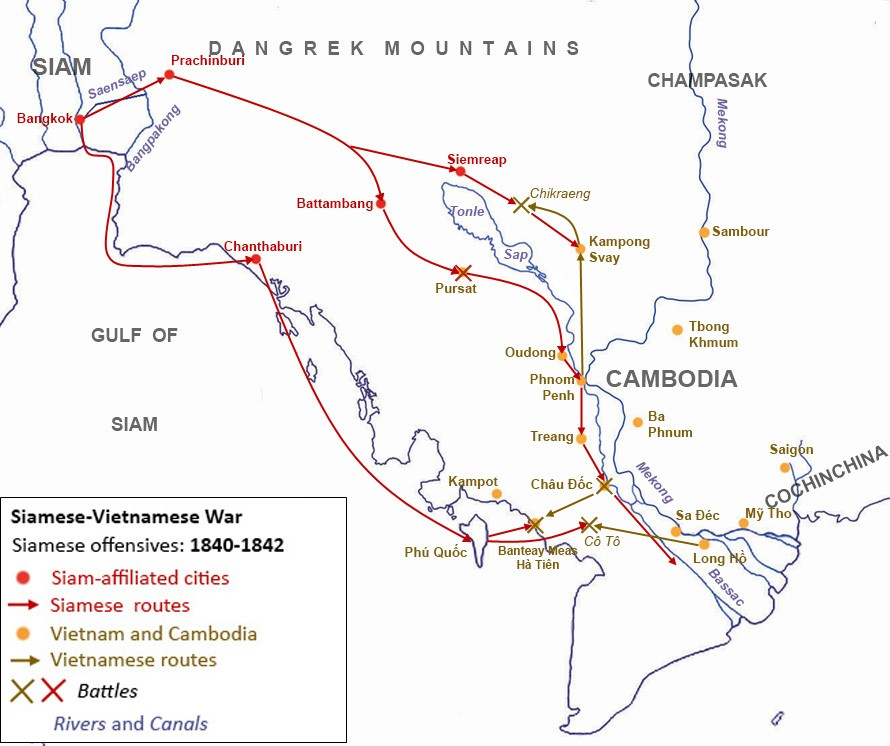
Map of army routes during the Siamese offensives of 1840–1842. Red represents Siamese routes. Yellow represents Vietnam and Cambodia.

Chaophraya Bodindecha and his second-in-command Chaophraya Nakhon Ratchasima Thong-in the governor of Nakhon Ratchasima led Lao–Siamese forces of around 8,700 men from Battambang to attack the Vietnamese-held Pursat in November 1841. In December, Bodindecha laid siege on Pursat, constructing forts connected with high barricades to completely encircle Pursat in all sides. Võ Đức Trung the Vietnamese commander at Pursat adopted a defensive strategy, relying on the walls of Pursat to hold off Siamese due to Siamese numerical superiority. Chaophraya Bodindecha pressured the Vietnamese at Pursat to accept a peace treaty so that Bodindecha would conquer Pursat through diplomacy. When the Vietnamese did not yield, Bodindecha intensified the attacks on Pursat in order to force the Vietnamese to surrender.

Trương Minh Giảng the Governor-General of Trấn Tây considered ten thousands of the Lao and Northern Khmer forces under Siamese commander Phraya Ratchanikun attacking Stoung to be the most threatening front. Trương Minh Giảng neglected the Pursat front, leaving Võ Đức Trung to face Bodindecha without support. In late December 1840, Trương Minh Giảng brought around 5,000 Vietnamese professional soldiers from Trấn Tây citadel at Phnom Penh to Kampong Thom and then to repel the Siamese from Stoung. Ratchanikun retreated to Chikreang, where Trương Minh Giảng followed. The Lao and Northern Khmer ethnic conscripts serving under Siam were in low morale and simply deserted the battlefield in panic when the Vietnamese arrived. Phraya Ratchanikun and the Siamese were thus defeated as Ratchanikun retreated to Phnom Srok. Trương Minh Giảng and the Vietnamese were able to repel Siamese invasion on Stuong and Chikraeng on the Kampong Thom front.

When Chaophraya Bodindecha learned that Trương Minh Giảng had defeated and repelled the Siamese under Phraya Ratchanikun on the Kampong Thom front and that Trương Minh Giảng was coming to the Pursat front, Bodindecha realized he had to force the Vietnamese in Pursat to yield before arrival of Trương Minh Giảng or else he would have to fight a hard battle. Eventually, Võ Đức Trung the Vietnamese commander at Pursat surrendered in late December 1840 and concluded a peace treaty with Bodindecha, which was not endorsed by the Vietnamese imperial court. When Trương Minh Giảng and the Vietnamese troops arrived in Pursat, they were shocked that Võ Đức Trung had concluded an unauthorized peace treaty with the Siamese. Not knowing what to do, Trương Minh Giảng and the Vietnamese did not attack the Siamese at Pursat, simply waiting out instead.

This Siamese invasion of Cambodia in late 1840 allowed Siam to exert control over Cambodia at the expense of the Vietnamese, taking advantage of the general Cambodian uprising against Vietnam. The Siamese king Rama III or King Nangklao endorsed the pro-Thai Cambodian prince Ang Duong, who had been in political custody in Bangkok since 1838 for his failed coup attempt in Battambang, as the official Siam-sponsored candidate for Cambodian kingship, sending out Ang Duong to Battambang in February 1841. In May 1841, Chaophraya Bodindecha the Siamese supreme commander in Cambodia put Ang Duong in Oudong the former Cambodian royal capital to rally the support from the Oknha nobility and Khmer people for Ang Duong and for Siam. The Vietnamese also released their own candidates Princess Ang Mey and Prince Ang Em to rally the Cambodians to their cause, setting them up in Phnom Penh. For six months, from May to November 1841, two rival Cambodian courts existed in Oudong and Phnom Penh, each backed by Siam and Vietnam, respectively. However, the Vietnamese situation in Cambodia deteriorated as they faced immense resistance from the Cambodians. Eventually, in early November 1841, Trương Minh Giảng and the Vietnamese abandoned the Trấn Tây citadel of Phnom Penh and retreated to Châu Đốc in Southern Vietnam, thus ending the Trấn Tây province and the six-year direct Vietnamese rule over Cambodia.

== See also ==
- Lê Văn Khôi revolt
- Siamese-Vietnamese wars
