= Phu Thanh =

Phu Thanh may refer to several commune-level subdivisions in Vietnam, including:

== Phú Thành ==
- Phú Thành, Đồng Tháp, a commune of Đồng Tháp province
- Phú Thành, Hòa Bình, a former commune of Lạc Thủy District
- Phú Thành, An Giang, a former commune of Phú Tân District, An Giang Province
- Phú Thành, Vĩnh Long, a former commune of Trà Ôn District
- Phú Thành, Nghệ An, a former commune of Yên Thành District

== Phú Thanh ==
- Phú Thanh, Đồng Nai, a commune of Tân Phú District, Đồng Nai
- Phú Thanh, Thanh Hóa, a commune of Quan Hóa District
- Phú Thanh, Thừa Thiên-Huế, a commune of Phú Vang District

== Phú Thạnh ==
- Phú Thạnh, Tân Phú, a ward of Tân Phú District, Ho Chi Minh City
- Phú Thạnh, Phú Yên, a ward of Tuy Hòa
- Phú Thạnh, An Giang, a commune of Phú Tân District, An Giang Province
- Phú Thạnh, Đồng Nai, a commune of Nhơn Trạch District
- Phú Thạnh, Tiền Giang, a commune of Tân Phú Đông District

== See also ==
- The communes of Phú Thành A and Phú Thành B in Tam Nông District, Đồng Tháp Province
