= Phú Tân district, An Giang =

Coordinates: 10°35′N 105°21′E

Phú Tân district Huyện Phú Tân
- District
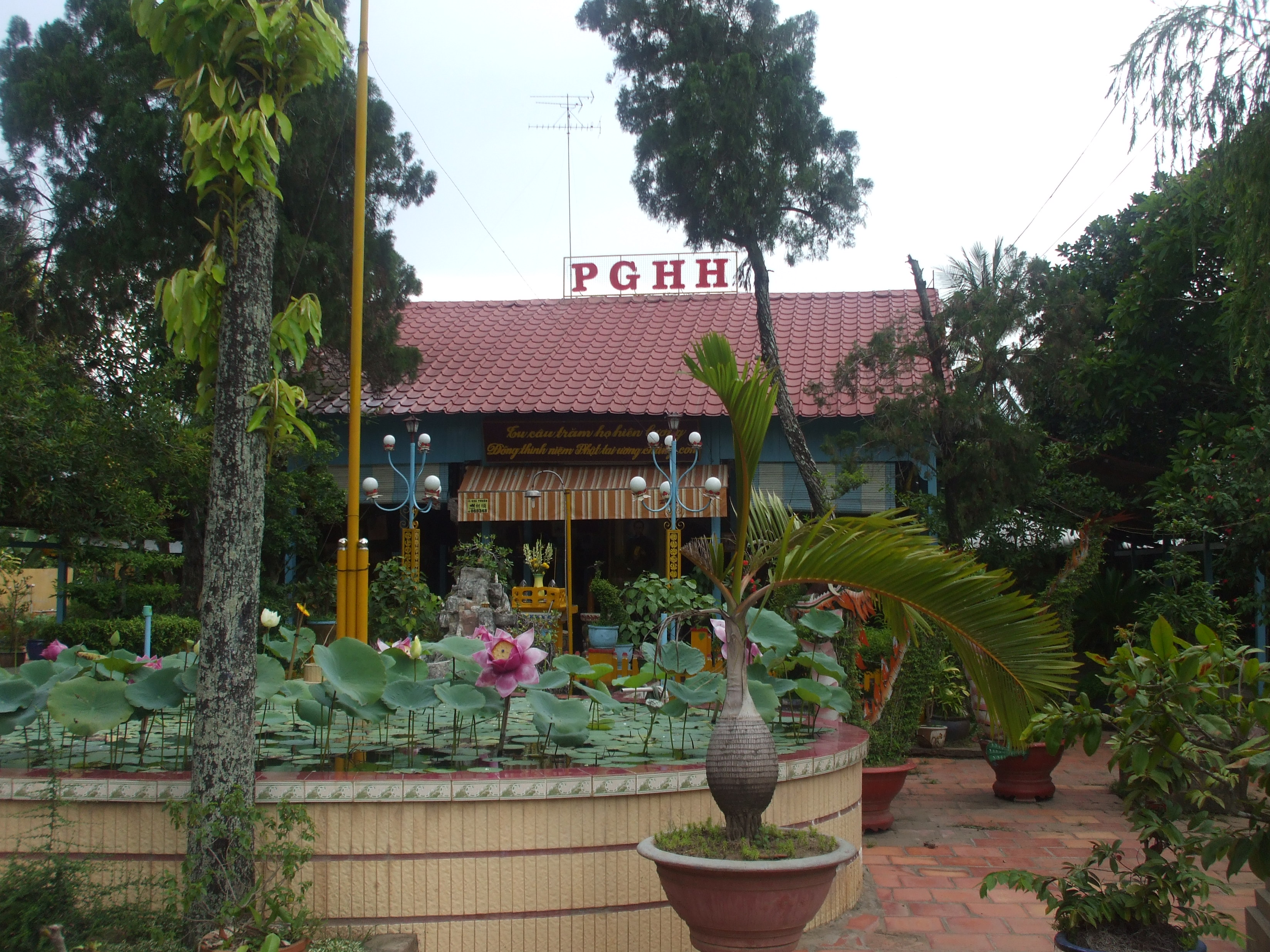
- Hòa Hảo religion ancestors worshiping temple in Phú Tân

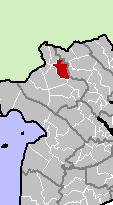
- Location in An Giang province
- Country: Vietnam
- Province: An Giang
- Capital: Phú Mỹ

Area
  - Land: 118.6 sq mi (307.1 km^{2})

Population (2019 census)
  - Total: 188,951
  - Density: 1,594/sq mi (615.3/km^{2})
- Time zone: UTC+07:00 (Indochina Time)

Phú Tân is a rural district (huyện) of An Giang province in the Mekong Delta region of Vietnam. As of 2019 the district had a population of 188,951. The district covers an area of 307 km^{2} (119 sq mi). The district capital lies at Phú Mỹ.

Phú Tân is the homeland of the Hòa Hảo Buddhism religion.

== Geography ==
The terrain is flat and the elevation is between 1 and 2 m. The population is mainly ethnic Vietnamese (98%) with Khmer people, some Cham and Hoa Chinese.

It is bordered to the north by Tân Châu, the west by Châu Đốc and Châu Phú district, the southeast by Chợ Mới, and the east by Đồng Tháp province. All four sides of Phú Tân are surrounded by waterways and rivers, effectively making it an island. These are the Tiền River in the east, Vĩnh An canal (linking the river with Hậu River) in the north and northwest, and Vàm Nao River in the south and southwest, which flows into the Bassac River.

== Administration ==
Tân Phú was established on 12 May 1968, by adding together portions of the old districts of Tân Châu and Châu Phú. In September 1974, Tân Phú and some communes of Đồng Tháp Province were split into two districts in Phú Tân, Tân Phú A and B. In 1976, these two districts were merged to form the current Tân Phú. Phú Tân derives its name from Châu Phú and Tân Châu.

Phú Tân has 19 administrative subdivisions, comprising two town: Phú Mỹ and Chợ Vàm, and the following communes: Long Sơn, Long Hòa, Phú Lâm, Phú Thạnh, Phú An, Phú Thọ, Tân Hòa, Tân Trung, Phú Hưng, Hiệp Xương, Bình Thạnh Đông, Phú Bình, Hòa Lạc, Phú Hiệp, Phú Thành, Phú Long and Phú Xuân.

The district is the site of some historical and cultural Cham artefacts and is a bastion of the Hòa Hảo.

== Economy ==
The average annual growth of the GDP of the district average in the period 2001–05 was 10.79%. In 2005, primary industries accounted for 41.6% of the economy, secondary industry for 20.8%, and services accounted for 37.6%.
