= Cambodian rebellion (1820) =

Anti-Vietnamese rebellion in Cambodia

- Part of Vietnamese invasions of Cambodia
Date	1820
Location	Cambodia, Cochinchina
Result	Uprising failed

Belligerents
Khmer anti-Vietnamese rebels	Nguyễn dynasty (Vietnam

Commanders and leaders
Chaophraya Tei (executed) (Note: In Vietnamese records, he was called Tham Đích Tây (參的西).); Narin Kol (executed) (Note: In Vietnamese records, he was called Kế Luyện (計練).); Naike (executed) (Note: In Vietnamese records, he was called Na Côn (那棍).); Kai † (Note: In Vietnamese records, he was called Tăng Kế (僧計, lit. "Monk Kế").); Kuy	Nguyễn Văn Trí; Nguyễn Văn Thoại; Ang Chan II (Note: In Vietnamese records, he was called Nặc Ông Chăn (匿螉禛).); Phraya Decho † (Note: In Vietnamese records, he was called Đức Kiều Mưu (德喬謀).); Chaophraya Tuan (Note: In Vietnamese records, he was called Chiêu Thùy Đồng Phò (昭錘同扶).)

Strength
30 ships	Unknown

Casualties and losses
Unknown	Unknown

The Cambodian rebellion of 1820, also known as the Neak sel Rebellion (lit. "the holy man's rebellion"), was a Cambodian revolt against Vietnam led by a monk named Kai.

== Background ==
At the time, Cambodia was in the grip of a "Dark Age", with internal affairs subject to interference from Siam and Vietnam. In 1813, Siam intervened in a royal dispute in Cambodia, prompting the Cambodian King Ang Chan to seek assistance from Vietnam. Vietnam subsequently stationed troops in Cambodia, transforming it into a protectorate. To strengthen its control over Cambodia, Vietnam constructed three major roads within the country to facilitate military transport. In 1817, it seized the important port of Châu Đốc, and two years later, it dug the Vĩnh Tế Canal between the port and Hà Tiên, annexing Cambodian territory south of the canal.

In 1819, Khmer and Vietnamese labors were forced to reconstruct the Vĩnh Tế Canal. The Khmer labors were heavily exploited by being forced to do hard work, which resulted in thousands of deaths from fatigue and consequent disease during the canal's construction. Kai, a monk originally from Wat Sambaur who claimed supernatural powers, revolted against the Vietnamese.

== Rebellion ==
Kai occupied the Khmer holy site Ba Phnom and subsequently declared king. He claimed that his supporters would possess the special ability to be invulnerable to weapons. Most of his followers were recruited in the area around Tây Ninh. Many Buddhist monks joined his forces. His army attacked Vietnamese military fortresses to the west and north. King Ang Chan of Cambodia sent an army composed of mixed Khmer and Vietnamese to suppress the rebellion, but the minister in charge deserted, leading to the failure of the suppression. Three Cambodian generals, Chaophraya Tei (or Somdet Tei, Samdech Tei), Narin Kol and Naike, joined the rebels.

The rebels sent more than 30 ships to attack Phnom Penh. Ang Chan wanted to flee the capital and sent a letter to Saigon to ask for help. Lê Văn Duyệt, the viceroy of Cochinchina, ordered Nguyễn Văn Thoại and Nguyễn Văn Trí to assemble an expeditionary force. The Vietnamese army defeated the rebels, killed many of them. Kai escaped, but was pursued and killed with many monks in Kampong Cham.Kai's assistance, the novice Kuy, escaped to live among the Lao. Other leaders had to surrender, including Chaophraya Tei, Narin Kol and Naike. They were put to death in Phnom Penh and Saigon.

== Aftermath ==
This rebellion served as a pretext for Vietnam to re-establish its military presence in Cambodia, since the following year, Vietnam sent Thoại Ngọc Hầu again to "protect" the country. Vietnam conscripted more Cambodians to complete the dredging project of the Vĩnh Tế Canal, causing even greater damage to the Cambodian economy.

Kai was respected by the Cambodian people, and poems praising the uprising circulated among the populace.

== Notes ==
Footnote

Citations

== See also ==
- Cambodian rebellion (1811–12)
- Cambodian rebellion (1840)
- Anti-Vietnamese sentiment
