= Vàm Nao River =

River in Vietnam

Coordinates: 10°32′28″N 105°19′37″E

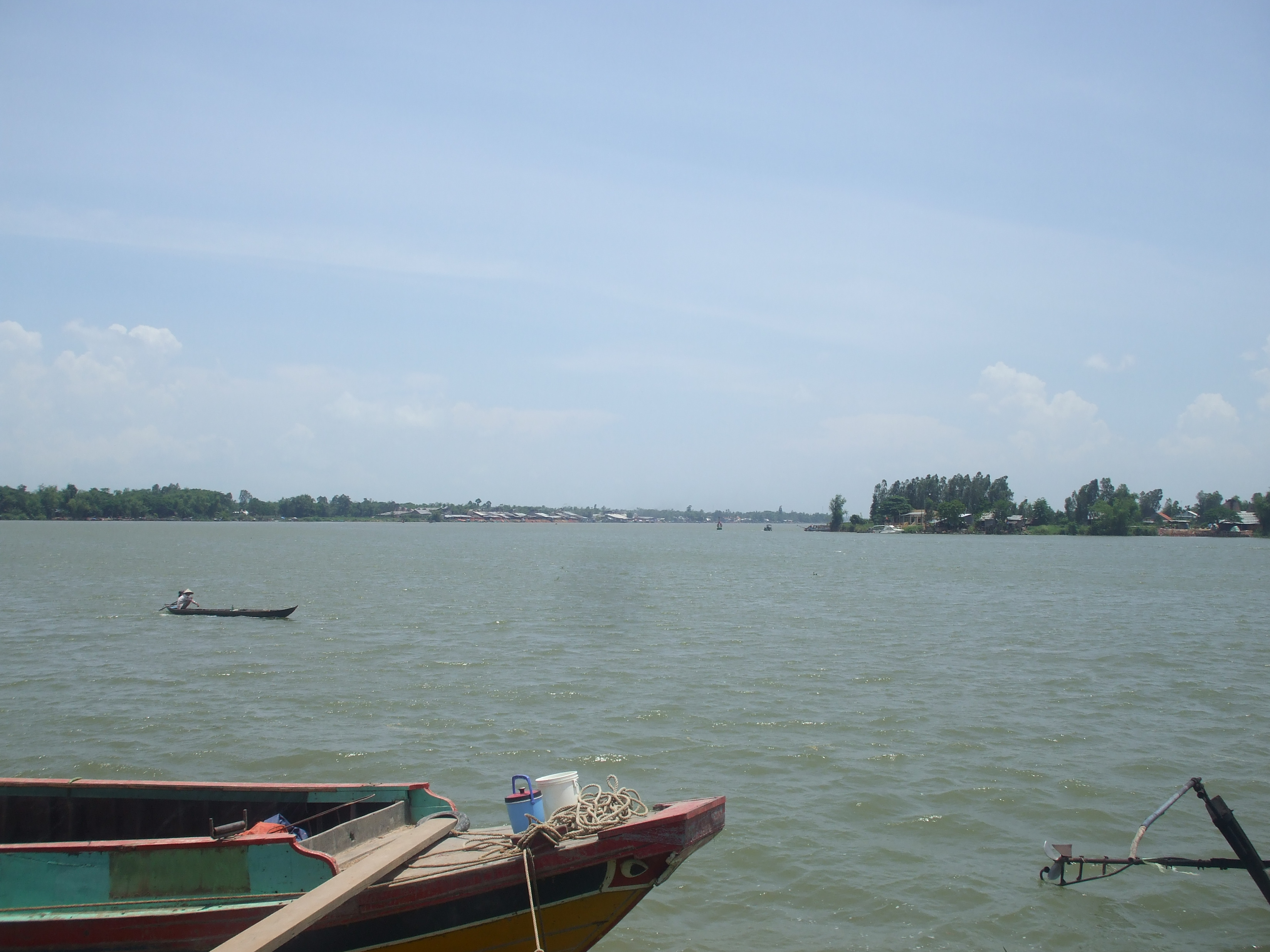
- Vàm Nao river in An Giang
- Native name: Sông Vàm Nao

Location
- Country: Vietnam
- Province: An Giang

Physical characteristics
- Source: Tiền River
  - location: Kiến An, Chợ Mới district & Tân Trung, Phú Tân district
- Mouth: Hậu River
  - location: Bình Thủy, Châu Phú district
- Length: 6.5 km (4.0 mi)

The Vam Nao River or Lao Vam is a 6.5 kilometre river in An Giang Province, Vietnam, running near the Vietnam-Cambodia border. It connects the Tien River with the Hau River. Vam Nao has an important role for the Cuu Long River Delta in irrigation and transport. Vam Nao is also famed for being the place of a fierce naval battle between the Vietnamese and the Siamese, and also because of its reef fish and catfish. On average the river is 700 metres wide and 17 metres deep.

It is the shortest river in Vietnam.
