= Ang Mey =

Queen of Cambodia

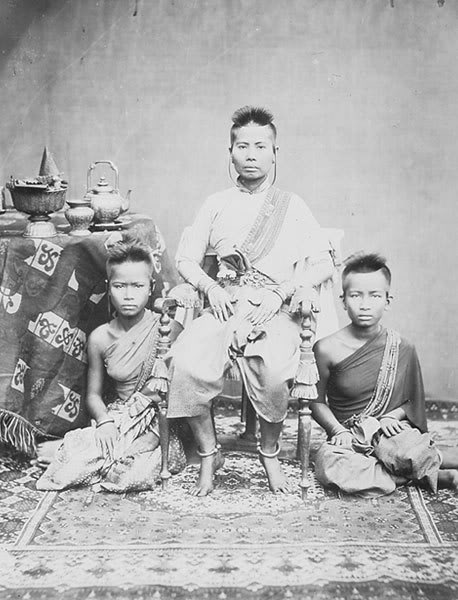

Queen of Cambodia
- First reign: 1835–1840
- Coronation: May 1835
- Predecessor: Ang Chan II (until 1834); Interregnum (1834–1835)
- Successor: Interregnum (1840–1844)
- Second reign: 1844–1846
- Predecessor: Interregnum (1840–1844)
- Successor: Interregnum (1846–1848); Ang Duong (from 1848)
- Born: 1815
- Died: December 1874 (aged 59); Oudong, French Cambodia
- Burial: Vihear Samnor Pagoda
- Issue: 20 sons and daughters
- Father: Ang Chan II
- Mother: Neak Moneang Krachap
- Religion: Buddhism

Ang Mey (Note: In Vietnamese record, she was called Ngọc Vân (玉雲).) (Khmer: អង្គម៉ី [ʔɑŋ məj]; 1815 – December 1874) was a monarch of Cambodia. Her official title was Samdech Preah Mahā Rājinī Ang Mey. She was one of the few female rulers in Cambodia's history, and the first one since Queen Tey. Installed on the Cambodian throne by the Vietnamese, her reign was dominated by the two wars between Siam and the Nguyễn dynasty: the Siamese–Vietnamese War (1833–1834) and the Siamese-Vietnamese War (1841–1845).

Queen Ang Mey, also known by her Vietnamese title Ngọc-Vân-công-chúa (Princess Ngọc Vân), was proclaimed monarch on the death of her father by the Vietnamese faction at court with the title of "Chân Lạp quận chúa" (Duchess of Cambodia) in January 1835, then deposed in August 1840 with the demoted title of "Mỹ-Lâm-quận-chúa" (Duchess of Mỹ Lâm). She was reinstated in 1844, and again removed from the throne by the Vietnamese and taken to Huế with her sisters in 1845.

== Biography ==
=== Early life ===
Ang Mey was born in 1815 as the second daughter of Ang Chan II, King of Cambodia during the Oudong period, by his second wife, Neak Moneang Krachap.

After King Ang Chan II died in 1834, there was no heir apparent to the Cambodian throne. The king had no son but four daughters: Princess Baen, Mey, Peou and Sngon. This delighted Vietnam and Siam, both of which wanted to eliminate the royal rulers in Cambodia. Although Ang Chan's surviving brothers, Ang Im and Ang Duang, immediately laid claim to the throne, the Vietnamese then occupying Cambodia did not allow them to be crowned.

Instead, the Vietnamese emperor and the Cambodian courtiers chose to install Ang Chan II's eldest daughter, Princess Ang Baen, as the sovereign. However, she was passed over due to her being sympathetic to the Thai court's interests and her refusal to marry the emperor's son. Ang Mey was an alternative to her sister, Baen. A Thai manuscript stated that the Vietnamese had tried to persuade Ang Mey to marry the son of emperor Gia Long in order to facilitate the incorporation of Cambodia into Vietnam; however, this plan was abandoned at strong objections from Cambodian nobles.

=== Puppet queen ===
In May 1835, Ang Mey was crowned with the title of quận chúa (郡主) or "Commandery Princess," a title of princess which was lower than công chúa (公主), bestowed by the court of Hué. Her three sisters were given the title huyện quân (縣君), or "sub-prefecture ladies". The Vietnamese kept close guard over the Ang princesses. Queen Ang Mey had two companies of soldiers, 100 men in total, for her personal protection. The other three Cambodian princesses were each assigned thirty soldiers. Ostensibly for their safety, the guards were in reality assigned to ensure that they did not escape.

During Ang Mey's reign, all Cambodian women were ordered to wear Vietnamese-style garments vi:áo ngũ thân instead of the khmer sampot (similar to the sarong), and had to grow their hair long in Vietnamese style. The market sold only Vietnamese food. Khmer classical dance had assimilated elements of Vietnamese and Chinese tradition. Cambodian officials had to don Vietnamese ceremonial garb. Wats were destroyed in order to eradicate the Khmer identity. Places also received Vietnamese names. The area around Phnom Penh was renamed Tran Tay, or "Western Commandery". The Cambodian people, not accustomed to be ruled by a Queen and despairing of the "Vietnamization" of their country, asked the Siamese to install a male ruler, Ang Duong, brother of Ang Chan II.

In 1840, the elder sister of Ang Mey, Princess Baen, was discovered corresponding with her mother and uncle who were living in Battambang and planning to escape to them. The princess was imprisoned pending her trial in Phnom Penh. The Vietnamese emperor, Minh Mạng, demoted Mey and the other princesses. In August 1841 they were all arrested and deported to Vietnam along with the royal regalia. Around that time, some of Ang Mey's relatives were imprisoned on the island of Poulo Condore. According to Thai and Cambodian sources, Ang Baen was drowned in the Mekong river, although Khin Sok states that Baen was tortured to death by the Vietnamese general and her body thrown in the river.

Spurred by the death of Princess Ang Baen and the absence of their Queen Ang Mey, many Cambodian courtiers and their followers revolted against the Vietnamese rule. Seizing the opportunity Siam invaded Cambodia in an attempt to install Ang Duong on the throne as their own puppet, triggering the Siamese–Vietnamese War (1841–45). In an attempt to defuse the rebellion, Vietnamese officials in Phnom Penh called for the return of Mey to Cambodia but the emperor Ming Mang refused. Only when the Vietnamese counter-offensive gained momentum and victory seemed assured was Mey returned to Phnom Penh. Her proclamation in March 1844 intended for the provincial officials and leaders sought their support while Ang Duong issued similar appeals from Oudong for his claim to the throne. Queen Ang Mey was reinstated as a queen and her sisters, Poeu and Sngon, as sub-prefecture rulers, in 1844.

As the warring factions fought to a stalemate in 1845, the Thai and Vietnamese initiated talks to resolve the Cambodian succession. In October 1846, the Vietnamese released the daughter and other family members of Ang Duong to join him in Oudong. Vietnam and Siam forged a compromise whereby both Ang Duong and Ang Mey would rule together are co-sovereigns. However, when the simultaneous coronation was held in Bangkok and Phnom Penh in 1848, records only show Ang Duong's accession to the throne. His niece, Ang Mey, was recorded as his successor instead of co-sovereign.

=== Later life ===
After her reign concluded, Ang Mey lived with memories of death and dishonour for over twenty years. She did not succeed the throne after Ang Duong's death. His son and heir, Norodom, left her in the care of an old retainer when he and his court moved to Phnom Penh. At Oudong, Ang Mey carried on, although sources described her as "unbalanced" when she took merchandise by her right as queen. Her servants had to intervene to placate the merchants.

She later married an unknown man and had two daughters. She and her husband died in an accident in late December 1874 but were cremated at Phnom Penh in 1884.

== Legacy and aftermath ==
Ang Mey was portrayed as a puppet of the Vietnamese emperor and officials in sources like The Cambodia Chronicle. Ang Duong took care to emphasize association between Mey and the Vietnamese, and blamed her rule for the loss of indentured slaves. Most chronicles of the period imply that the Cambodian courtiers acquiesced to Ang Mey as their sovereign while secretly holding out for Ang Im or Ang Duong to return as sovereign. There were even rumors that Mey was a concubine of Truong Minh Giang, the Vietnamese governor in Phnom Penh but there is no historical evidence of such a liaison. Others tempered their allegation of Ang Mey's misdeeds; the once beautiful princess may have sold her country, but not her body, to the Vietnamese.

During the succession crisis, Ang Mey did seem to seek a peaceful solution to the factional strife in Cambodia, corresponding through Ang Duong's envoys that she wished for a return to peace and the family's reunion. This may have been at diplomatic response; the Vietnamese annals described her as an intelligent young lady at the time of her accession. Sudden and forced relocations to Vietnam and back, the murder of her sisters, and continued changes in her status may have induced hysterical or untoward behaviour. By the end of her reign, Ang Mey reportedly was mad.

Cambodian history has constructed Mey as a passive victim hardly legitimate in the eye of her own people, her reign a disaster during which Khmer territory, culture, and independence was almost lost. While it cannot be denied that the Vietnamese were in control of Cambodia during Ang Mey's reign, she inherited a country that had already been mortgaged to the Court of Hué by her father, Ang Chan II. Mey was crowned sovereign of a kingdom under Vietnamese overlordship. It is difficult to ascertain what course of action other than acquiescence was available to her.

== In popular culture ==
She was portrayed as a character in Thai television drama stories namely Khabadin (ข้าบดินทร์) Portrayed by Sarocha Watittapan.

== Notes ==
Ang Mey House of Ang Born: 1 February 1815 Died: December 1874
Regnal titles
Preceded by Ang Chan	Queen of Cambodia; 1835–1840 and 1844–1846	Succeeded by Ang Duong
