= Trương Minh Giảng =

Governor-General of Trấn Tây (Cambodia)
- Reign: 1835–1841
- Successor: title abolished
- Vietnamese emperor: Minh Mạng
- Cambodian queen: Ang Mey
- Counselor: Lê Đại Cương; Dương Văn Phong
- Born: 1792; Gia Định Province
- Died: 1841 (aged 48–49); An Giang Province
- Burial: Gò Vấp
- Father: Trương Minh Thành
- Religion: Buddhist

Trương Minh Giảng (chữ Hán: 張明講, 1792 – 1841) was a general and official of Vietnam during the Nguyễn dynasty.

== Early life ==
Trương-Minh Giảng was born in Gia Định (modern Ho Chi Minh City). He came from an important aristocratic family of southern Vietnam, the Trương-Minh family from which also comes the scholar Trương Minh Ký (1855-1900). His father, Trương-Minh Thành was the minister of ceremony (Lễ bộ Thượng thư) of Emperor Gia Long. Giảng passed the triennial exam with the grade of hương cống in 1819. He became a military mandarin in the service of Emperor Minh-Mang and was appointed major general.

== Career ==
A rebellion was launched by Lê Văn Khôi in Gia Định in 1833. This was an important revolt in southern Vietnam, Giảng was sent to put down the rebellion together with Tống Phúc Lương, Nguyễn Xuân, Phan Văn Thúy and Trần Văn Năng.

Two Siamese generals, Bodindecha and Phra Klang, led troops to attack the Vietnamese provinces of Hà Tiên and An Giang and Vietnamese imperial forces in Laos and Cambodia. Giảng and his 10,000 soldiers defeated the Siamese army in Cambodia, and installed Ang Chan II as a client king of Cambodia. Giảng was appointed Governor-General of Cambodia and stayed in Phnom Penh to watch the king.

In 1835 Ang Chan II died without heir. Giảng installed Ang Mey as a client queen. He ordered all Cambodian women to wear Vietnamese-style pyjamas instead of the khmer sampot (similar to the sarong), grow their hair long in Vietnamese style. Phnom Penh was renamed with a Vietnamese name: Trấn Tây Thành (鎮西城), or "Western Commandery". Many Wats (temples) were destroyed during this period, and numerous ethnic Vietnamese came to Cambodia.

Cambodia became a part of Vietnam in 1841, and Ang Mey was deposed and exiled to Gia Định. Many Cambodian were infuriated, and revolted against the Vietnamese rule. Seizing the opportunity, Siam invaded Cambodia in an attempt to install Ang Duong on the throne as their own puppet, triggering the Siamese–Vietnamese War (1841–45). Giảng tried to resist but failed. The new emperor Thiệu Trị suddenly decided to withdraw all Vietnamese troops from Cambodia following the advice of Tạ Quang Cự.

Giảng died suddenly on his way back to Huế. Sources stated that he committed suicide by taking poison together with other two senior generals to avoid punishment from the emperor.
