= Phan Văn Thúy =

Vietnamese general (??–1833)

Phan Văn Thúy (潘文璻, ? – 1833) was a general and official of the Nguyễn dynasty, Vietnam.

== Life ==
Anouvong, the king of Vientiane, launched a rebellion against Siam in 1826, but was defeated by Bodindecha. Thúy was sent to support him.

Two years later, Anouvong came back to Vientiane and decided to revolt against Siam again. As Rama III raised an army to quell the rebellion, Anouvong asked for the help of the Vietnamese. Minh Mạng, the emperor of Vietnam, accepted the offer and sent troops to Laos. However, it was just a pretext for annexing the region. Phan Văn Thúy, Nguyễn Văn Xuân, Nguyễn Khoa Hào was sent to support him, but marched slowly. After Anouvong's defeat and execution by Siamese, the rest part of Vientiane Kingdom was annexed by Vietnam and renamed to the Vietnamese name: Trấn Ninh (鎮寧), or "Tranquil Commandery".

Thúy was sent to put down Lê Văn Khôi revolt together with Tống Phúc Lương, Nguyễn Xuân, Trương Minh Giảng and Trần Văn Năng in 1833.

== Death ==
He fell ill in Biên Hòa and died in Khánh Hòa.
