= Chợ Vàm =

- Commune
- Location in Vietnam
- Coordinates: 10°33′21″N 105°15′55″E
- Country: Vietnam
- Province: An Giang Province
- Time zone: UTC+07:00
- Climate: Aw

Chợ Vàm is a commune (xã) of An Giang Province, Vietnam.

Cho Vam Town has an area of 17.06 km^{2}, with a population of about 20,000 in 1999, [1] with a population density of 1,060 people per km^{2}.

The administrative boundary of Cho Vam town: in the east and north it borders on Dong Thap province (separated by Tien river), Phu Thanh commune in the west, Phu An commune in the south.
