= Phú Tân, An Giang =

Phú Tân Xã Phú Tân
- Commune
- Location in Vietnam
- Coordinates: 9°45′N 106°0′E
- Country: Vietnam
- Province: An Giang
- Established: 16 June 1997

Area
  - Total: 2.71 sq mi (7.01 km^{2})

Population (1999)
  - Total: 21,931
  - Density: 8,100/sq mi (3,129/km^{2})
- Time zone: UTC+07:00 (Indochina Time)
- Climate: Aw

Phú Mỹ is a commune (xã) and town of An Giang Province, Vietnam.
