= Thoại Ngọc Hầu =

Vietnamese military administrator

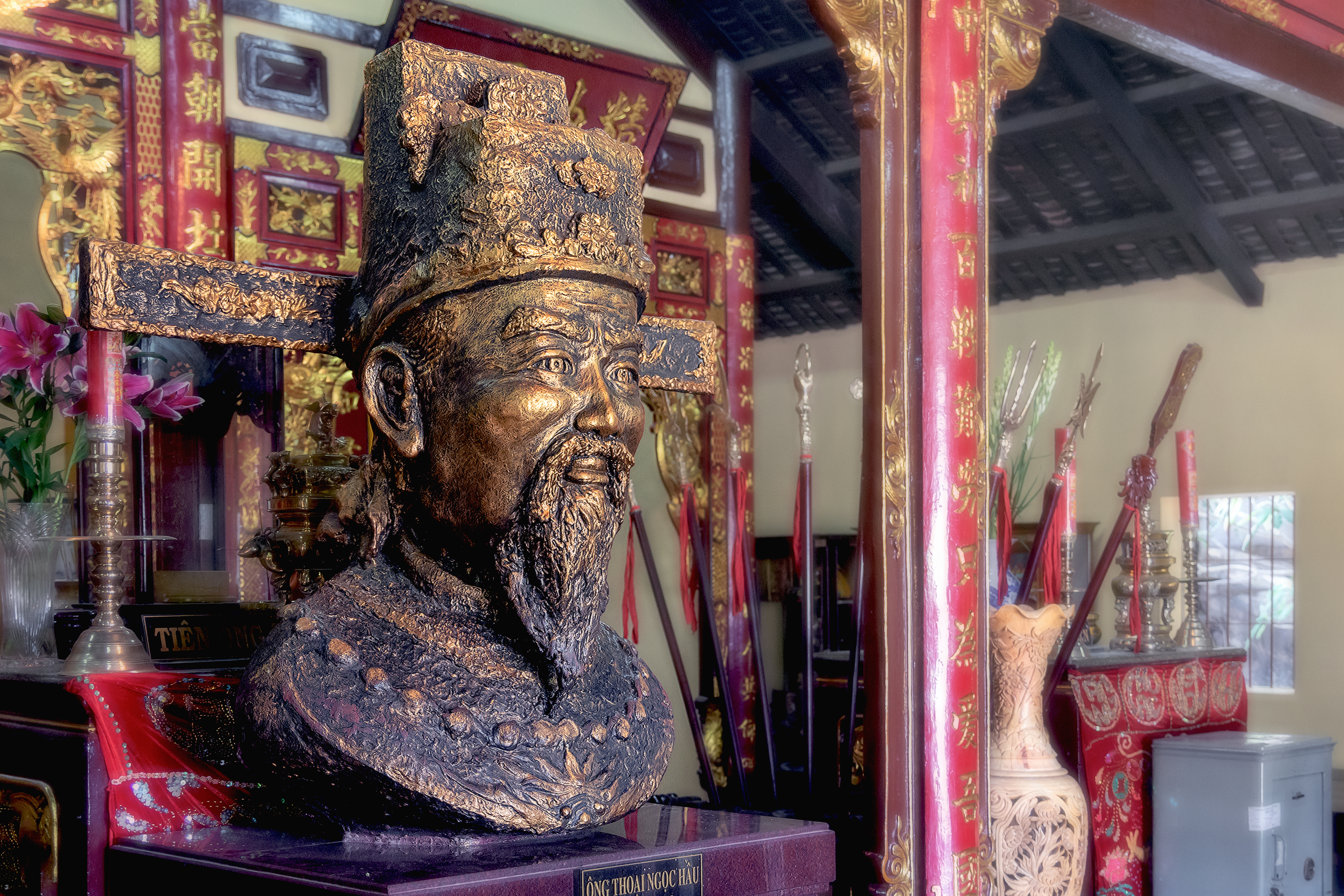
Image of Thoại Ngọc Hầu on Mt. Sam

Nguyễn Văn Thoại, Marquis of Thoại Ngọc (Vietnamese: Thoại Ngọc hầu Nguyễn Văn Thoại, chữ Hán: 瑞玉侯 阮文瑞, 1761–1829), was a Vietnamese military administrator of the Nguyễn dynasty.

In 1926 the was built to worship at his tomb on Sam Mountain in Mekong Delta of Vietnam.

== Early life and career ==
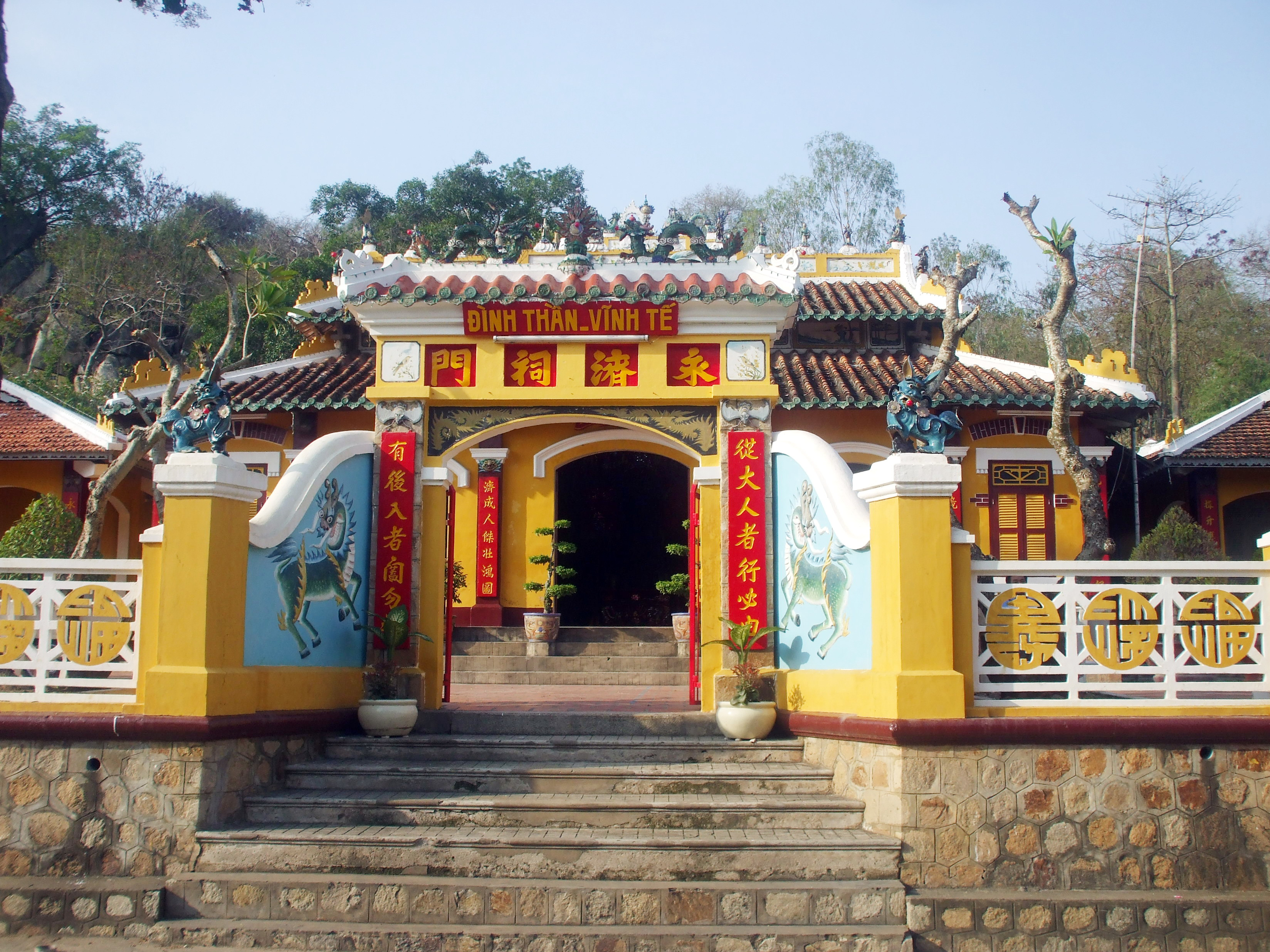
Đình Vĩnh Tế worships Thoại Ngọc Hầu

Nguyễn Văn Thoại was born on 26 November 1761 in Dien Ban district of the Quang Nam province under the Nguyen dynasty. His father, Nguyễn Văn Lượng, was a small official in charge of offering sacrifices at temples or shrines established by the state. His mother is Nguyễn Thị Tuyết, the second wife of Nguyễn Văn Lượng.

Nguyen Van Thoai was born and raised when Trinh and Nguyen fought constantly, followed by the Tay Son revolt (1771), therefore, his mother had to lead him and his two brothers to flee to the South in 1775, finally settling in Thoi Binh village on Dai islet, lying between Bang Tra and Co Chien rivers; now belongs to Vung Liem District, Vinh Long province.

== Military career ==
In 1777, Nguyen Van Thoai, who was 16 years old, joined the Nguyen army at Ba Giong (Dinh Tuong).

In 1778, he was present in the battle to recapture Gia Dinh citadel.

In 1782, the Tay Son army defeated the Nguyen lord at Can Gio gate, as a loyal follower of Nguyen lord, he supported Lord Nguyen Phuc Anh and fled to Ba Giong (Dinh Tuong).

From 1784 to 1785, he followed Lord Nguyen to Siam twice to ask for help.

From 1787 to 1789, Nguyen Van Thoai had merit in recapturing Gia Dinh citadel, so he was ordained as Cai Co. In 1791, he was appointed as the Tac Khai border guard (i.e. Lap gate in Ba Ria).

In 1792, he went to Siam again, on the way back he defeated the Portuguese pirates (Giavanays, Javanese).

In consecutive years 1796, 1797, 1799, he was sent by the lord to Siam.

In 1800, Nguyen Van Thoai was awarded the title of Kham Sai Thuong Dao Binh Tay General, coordinated with Laos to fight the Tay Son army in Nghe An. But in 1801, he was demoted to the post of Captain of the Thanh Chau Dao team, because he voluntarily left the South without waiting for the above order.

In 1802, Lord Nguyen unified the country and took the throne as Gia Long. On the occasion of rewarding his servants with meritorious services, Nguyen Van Thoai was only granted the title of Kham sai Thong military commander, accepted the task of conquering the North and then held the position of Tran guard there. Shortly after, he received the order to be the foreman of Lang Son, and then returned to the South to receive the position of governor of the fortress of Dinh Tuong (1808).

In 1812, he went to Cambodia to welcome Nac Ong Chan back to Gia Dinh.

In 1813, he escorted Nac Chan back to the country and stayed to receive the task of protecting Cambodia.

== Career as the governor of Vinh Thanh ==
=== Construction projects ===
After three years in Cambodia, Thoai Ngoc Hau was summoned to Hue (1816), then took the position of governor of Vinh Thanh town (1817). In the same year, he established 5 villages on Dai island.

In Vinh Thanh town, he fervently took care of reclamation, establishing hamlets, digging canals, developing and protecting the new land. His great works left for future generations are:

- Thoai Ha canal: started digging in 1818, more than 30 km long, connecting Dong Xuyen canal (Long Xuyen) with Gia Khe mountain (Rach Gia). After digging, King Gia Long allowed him to take his name to name the mountain (Tho Son) and the name of the canal (Thao Ha).
- Vinh Te canal: dug along the southwest border connecting Chau Doc - Ha Tien (i.e. connecting Chau Doc river to the Gulf of Thailand). The canal is more than 87 km long, mobilized tens of thousands of workers from 1819 to 1824 (with 4 delays in digging). The canal is named after his main wife, Lady Chau Thi Te.

In 1823, he established 5 villages on the banks of Vinh Te canal, namely Vinh Nguon, Vinh Te, Vinh Dieu, Vinh Gia and Vinh Thong. Regarding the founding of his village, the history of the Nguyen dynasty has a passage: "The executioner of Chau Doc was Marshal Nguyen Van Thuy in front of the grave of the people who moved to the border land, set up 20 communes and villages, borrowed from the public 1,900 mandarins. money and 1,500 squares of rice for the people, which has been postponed for many years, the people have not yet been able to pay. Until now, Thuy has brought back the family's property to compensate the people".

In 1825, he built a road from Chau Doc to Lo Go (now Angkor Borei town) - Soc Vinh connecting the villages together, very convenient for people to travel.

Sam Mountain–Chau Doc Highway, 5 km long, made from 1826 to 1827, mobilized nearly 4,500 workers. After finishing, he had the stele "Chau Doc Tan Lo Kieu Luong" carved on Sam mountain in 1828 to commemorate. Today, the stele no longer exists, but the epitaph in history books.

The above works are considered as the basis for the Vietnamese to place long-term sovereignty over this new land.

=== Other accomplishments ===
1820: He defeated the rebellion of Sai Ke. Sai Ke is an unknown Khmer who rebelled against the Nguyen dynasty. The army could not resist. When the power grew, Sai Ke claimed to be Chieu Vuong, led his subordinates to attack many places in Phien An town (Gia Dinh), and harassed the whole of Cambodia. The governor of Gia Dinh Thanh at that time was Le Van Duyet, he immediately sent Huynh Cong Ly, then sent more Nguyen Van Tri and Nguyen Van Thoai to defeat it. Sai Ke was killed in battle.

In 1821, he held the position of Marshal of the Protectorate of Cambodia, concurrently the keeper of Chau Doc fortress and the governor of Ha Tien. Remembering the merits of his protection, in the fourth lunar month of 1824, Nac Ong Chan (Ang Chan II), donated to the Nguyen dynasty through Nguyen Van Thoai (to repay Thoai), 3 regions of Chan Sum (also known as Chan Thanh). or Chan Chiem, located between Giang Thanh and Chau Doc), Mat Luat (Ngoc Luat, also between Giang Thanh and Chau Doc), Loi Kha Bat (Prey Kabbas, Takeo province). The Nguyen dynasty only took 2 lands Chan Sum and Mat Luat (Mat Luat later became the land of Tay Xuyen district). Chan Sum was later divided into two districts, Ha Am and Ha Duong, once belonging to Tinh Bien province, Ha Tien province, before being divided to An Giang province.

In 1827, he established the Chau Doc army to defend Chau Doc, setting up An Hai army to defend Ha Tien. Also in this year, he had a visit to his hometown, An Hai village. During the days in the countryside, he restored An Hai market, and at the same time worshiped money to build the village's communal house and pagoda. Going to remember his merits, the villagers honored him as a post-sage.

In September 1828, he built the Vinh Te Son stele, also known as the "Tha De's stele sacrifices the soul of Vinh Te Tan Kinh", an inscription with 730 words, the content of the sacrifice to the souls of people and soldiers who died during the digging of canals in Vinh Thanh canal digging was erected.
