= American–Siamese Treaty of 1856 =

1856 treaty between the United States and Siam

Treaty of Amity and Commerce, with General Regulations and Tariff of Export and Inland Duties
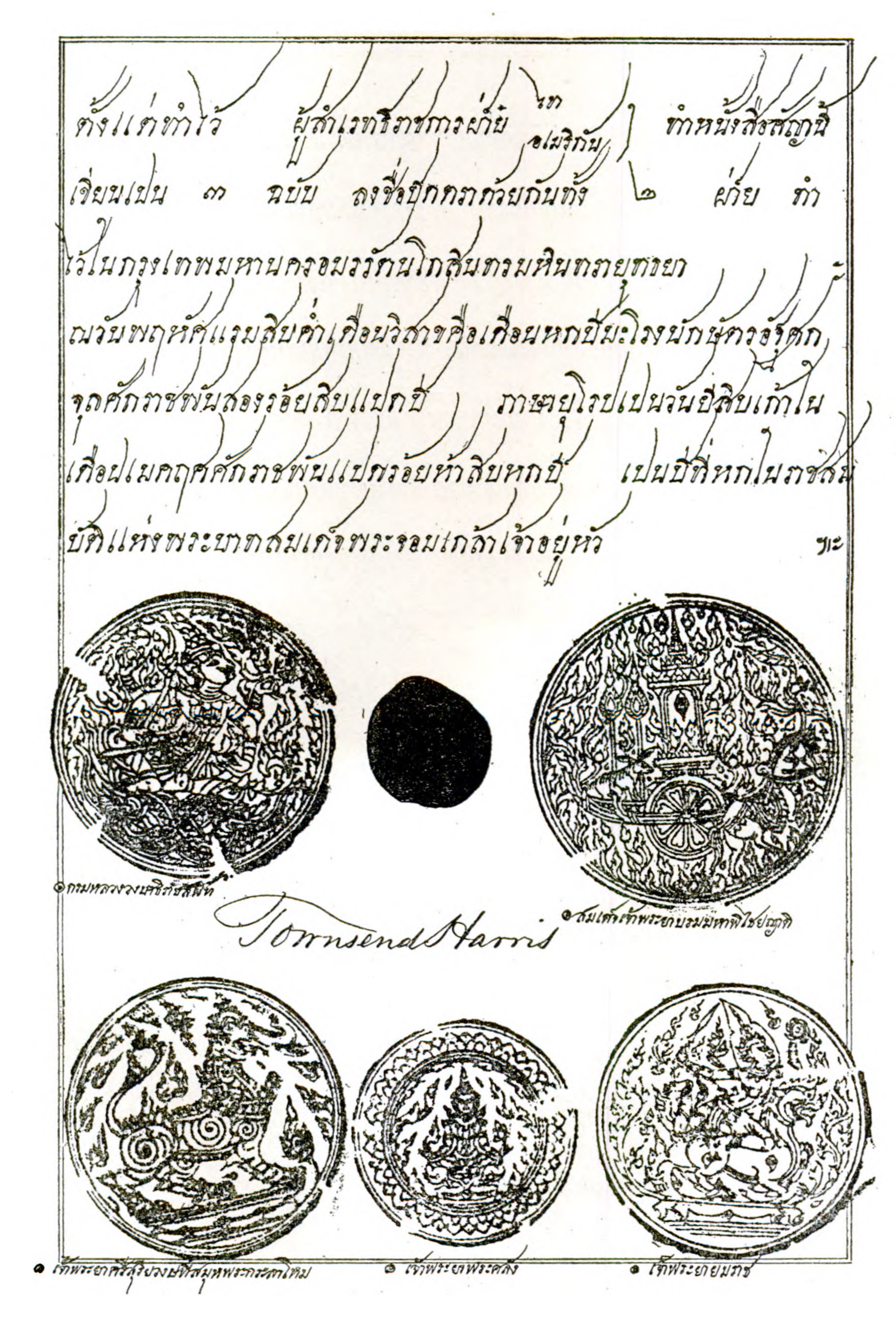
- Last page of Thai language version of the treaty showing the signature of Townsend Harris and the seals of five Siamese commissioners
- Type: Unequal Treaty
- Signed: 29 May 1856
- Location: Thonburi Palace, Bangkok
- Ratified: 15 June 1857
- Expiration: 1 September 1921 (64 years); American–Siamese Treaty of 1920
- Signatories: (United States) Townsend Harris; (Thailand) Wongsa Dhiraj Snid (Thailand) Somdet Chaophraya Phichaiyat (That Bunnag) (Thailand) Chaophraya Si Suriyawong (Chuang Bunnag) (Thailand) Chaophraya Rawiwong (Kham Bunnag) (Thailand) Chaophraya Yommarat Nuch
- Parties: United States; (Thailand) Kingdom of Siam
- Language: English; Thai

Treaty of Amity and Commerce, with General Regulations and Tariff of Export and Inland Duties (Thai: หนังสือสัญญาทางพระราชไมตรีประเทศอเมริกันแลประเทศสยาม) was a treaty between Siam or Rattanakosin Kingdom under King Mongkut or King Rama IV and the United States during the presidency of Franklin Pierce. The treaty was signed at Bangkok on May 29, 1856 during the diplomatic mission of the American envoy Townsend Harris to Siam. This American–Siamese Harris Treaty of 1856 was modeled after the preceding Anglo–Siamese Bowring Treaty of 1855 and was one of many Bowring-type unequal treaties that Siam concluded with Western nations in mid-nineteenth century.

After conclusion of the Anglo–Siamese Burney Treaty in 1826, Siam also concluded the similar American–Siamese Roberts Treaty in 1833, which, in parallel to the Burney Treaty, abolished Siam's royal monopoly on Western trades in favor of free trade for the Americans. However, Siam still levied the so-called measurement duties. The British and the American people in Siam were still subjected to traditional Siamese legal and judiciary system. American attempt to send Joseph Balestier to revise the treaty with Siam in 1850 ended badly. With the rise of influence of the British Empire in the Far East and ascension of King Mongkut, who had been well-disposed towards Westerners, the British plenipotentiary Sir John Bowring managed to conclude the eponymous Bowring Treaty in April 1855, which abolished the measurement duties, reduced Siam's import duty to flat three-percent and established British extraterritorial jurisdiction in Siam.

Simultaneously, the United States had been working on the opening of the secluded Tokugawa Japan. Townsend Harris the American merchant, who had been venturing in the Far East, was appointed as the American Consul General to Japan. In order to procure the same Siamese concessions as Britain for the United States, Townsend Harris proposed to William L. Marcy the Secretary of State that Harris himself would go to make a new treaty with Siam on his journey to Japan. Harris' plan to Siam was approved in September 1855. Townsend Harris arrived in Siam in April 1856 but his negotiation with the Siamese plenipotentiaries was delayed for a month due to Siam being busy dealing with the British envoy Harry Parkes. After some hassle, the American–Siamese Harris Treaty was concluded on May 29, 1856. This Harris Treaty was nearly identical to the Bowring Treaty word-by-word and article-by-article, as both contained twelve articles, with only some alterations. Main provisions of the treaty were;

- Establishment of American consular and extraterritorial jurisdiction in Siam
- Abolition of Siamese measurement duties and stipulation of low three-percent import duty for American merchants
- Permission for the Americans to own lands and settle in the designated area surrounding Bangkok

After conclusion of this American–Siamese Treaty, Charles William Bradley, the American Consul at Ningpo, who was then in Hong Kong, brought the treaty to the Department of State. President James Buchanan ratified the treaty on March 16, 1857. Charles W. Bradley then brought the ratified treaty to Bangkok, where the ratifications were exchanged on June 15, 1857.

Unlike the treaties that Siam had made with Britain and France, Siam's treaty terms with the United States remained mostly unchanged through six decades as the United States did not engage in any territorial or sovereignty disputes with Siam. By 1909, there were only 155 American citizens in Siam, most of whom were Protestant missionaries. American political and commercial interests in Siam had remained negligible up to that time. Following the American entry into World War I on the Allies side, Siam did the same in 1917 in order to procure revision and abrogation of the unequal treaties Siam had earlier made with Western nations. In 1920, Phraya Praphakarawong Chai Bunnag, the Siamese Minister at Washington D.C., negotiated with Frank Polk, the Secretary of State, resulting in the American–Siamese Treaty of December 1920, during the presidency of Woodrow Wilson, which abolished most of American extraterritorial jurisdiction and three-percent import duty for the Americans in Siam.

== History of American–Siamese relations ==
=== Traditional Siamese commercial and legal systems ===
Since the fifteenth century, in the Ayutthaya period, the Siamese royal court held a monopoly over Western trade. All incoming Western merchant vessels could only trade through Phra Khlang Sinkha (Thai: พระคลังสินค้า) or the Royal Warehouse, who would determine the price and collect duties on the import articles. Western merchants could not import merchandise to directly and privately trade with the local Siamese. This royal Siamese monopoly over Western trade had been generating a great amount of revenue for the Siamese government at the expense of the Western merchants. For import, Westerners were subjected to two duties; the eight-percent import duty, which was collected in kind not in cash and the measurement duty, which was collected proportionally according to the measured width of the vessel. For export, Western merchants could only purchase valuable restricted goods from the Phra Khlang Sinkha, who would again set price, not buying directly from the Siamese. The Western merchants were also subjected to export duties.

Traditional Siamese legal and judiciary systems were based on the Classical Indian legal system, taking as a model the Indian texts including the secular Arthashastra statecraft treatise and the religious Manusmṛti or the Law of Manu. Judiciary tortures, trial by ordeal and public humiliation were common practice. Presumption of guilt, in which the defendants were presumed guilty until proven innocent, prevailed, in contrast to presumption of innocence in Western judicial systems. When a suspected criminal did not confess, the Siamese investigators applied judiciary physical tortures known as Charit Nakhonban or Nakhonban creed, including flogging with rattan canes, being bound in cangues, being tied up and thrown into water, being exposed to the heat of daylight and being slapped in the mouth. To testify, sometimes defendants and plaintiffs alike were made to dive into water and walk into fire. Western visitors had been horrified at this Indo–Siamese judicial system, which they sought to dissociate themselves from.

Portugal was the first Western nation to establish official relations with Siam in the Rattanakosin Period. In 1820, the Portuguese envoy Carlos Manuel da Silveira arrived in Bangkok to conclude the Luso–Siamese Agreement of 1820, which allowed establishment of the Portuguese Consulate in Bangkok. Portugal became the first Western nation to have a consulate in Siam. However, the Portuguese Consulate was solely of commercial purpose and the Portuguese Consul was not yet accorded with extraterritorial powers over Portuguese subjects in Siam. Unlike the British, who would soon arrive, the Portuguese did not seek to challenge nor dismantle the existing traditional Siamese rules and systems.

The British, in contrast, saw the traditional Siamese royal monopoly as an obstacle, depriving the British merchants of due benefits. With the era of mercantilism gone, the British saw 'free trade' as the better alternative against the Asian monopoly systems. In 1821, the British Indian Government sent John Crawfurd as the delegate of British East India Company to procure a free trade agreement with Siam. Crawfurd arrived in Bangkok in March 1822 and faced difficulties due to the general Siamese distrust of Westerners and the language barrier. By that time, not a single person in Siam knew the English language. During the conversations, Crawfurd's English speech was interpreted into Malay and then into Portuguese and then into Thai language. Crawfurd proposed to Phraya Suriyawong Montri, personal name Dit Bunnag, the Phrakhlang or Siamese Minister of Trade and Foreign Affairs, that Siam should streamline and simplify the import, export and measurement duties, which accounted for about one-tenth of Siamese state revenue, into one single duty that would be collected only once. Perplexed, Crawfurd left Siam empty-handed without obtaining any free trades. However, Crawfurd's mission to Siam was not fruitless as it paved way for subsequent British diplomatic advances on Siam.

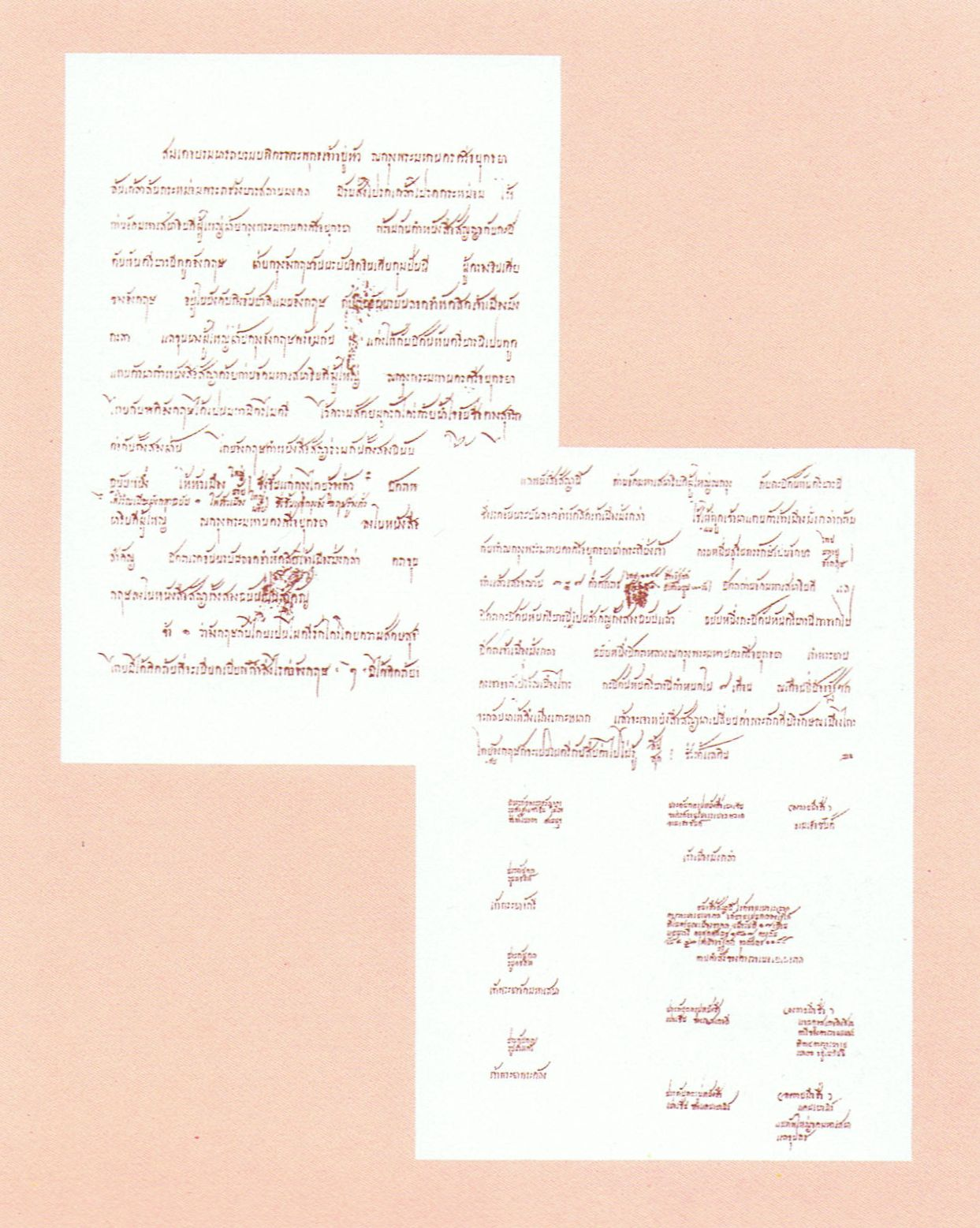
Anglo–Siamese Burney Treaty of 1826 abolished Siamese royal monopoly over Western trade. British merchants were allowed to trade freely in Siam. However, the measurement duty remained and the British were subjected to local Siamese laws.

British prevail over Burma, Siam's traditional enemy, during the First Anglo–Burmese War, changed Siamese worldview. The Siamese came to the conclusion that further resisting British demands might subject Siam to the same fate as Burma. British Indian Government tried again by sending Henry Burney, who could speak Malay, to obtain a free trade treaty from Siam. Henry Burney arrived in Bangkok in November 1825. King Rama III or King Nangklao of Siam assigned Chaophraya Phrakhlang Dit Bunnag to negotiate with Burney. The Treaty between Siam and Great Britain, known in Thai historiography as the Burney Treaty, was concluded on 20 June 1826.

Article VI of this Burney Treaty granted free trade to the British, who were allowed to trade anywhere with anybody in Siam, abolishing the monopoly of Phra Khlang Sinkha. However, the Additional Articles concerning British trade in Siam, signed in January 1827, favored Siam. All custom duties were coalesced into one single "measurement duty", which would be paid only once according to the width of the incoming merchant ships, measured by Siamese officials. The rate was fixed at 1,700 ticals for each Siamese fathom in breadth. This notorious measurement duty would be the point of contention, which both the British and the Americans would seek to dismantle.

Both John Crawfurd and Henry Burney proposed appointment of a British resident agent in Siam, to which the Siamese rejected, saying that establishment of such British Consulate in Siam would be a contravention of Siam's sovereignty, even though Siam had granted the Portuguese to have their consulate but the Siamese saw the Portuguese case as a bad example. Both Crawfurd and Burney did not push forward extraterritoriality as the primary concern and Siam took this opportunity to assert its jurisdiction over British subjects in Siam. Article I of the Burney Treaty stated that "The Siamese shall settle every matter within the Siamese boundaries according to their own will and customs", while the Article I of the Additional Articles stated that all British subjects in Siam, including the Europeans, the Asiatics and the British vessels, were to conform to Siamese laws.

=== Arrival of the Americans in Siam ===
The Second Great Awakening, which focused on Christian revival, personal conversion, emotional experiences and preaching of the Gospel, resulted in missionary movements in the United States. Five Williams College students of the revival movement gathered in the Haystack Prayer Meeting in Williamstown, Massachusetts in 1806, discussing the prospect of sending American missionaries to preach in Asia, where the people had been mostly oblivious to Protestantism. Samuel John Mills, the leader of the movement, soon acquired volunteers as missionaries to found the American Board of Commissioners for Foreign Missions or ABCFM in 1810, the first-ever American missionary organization, which had a Congregationalist origin. The first area of interest for these earliest American missionaries was the British India. In 1812, the ABCFM sent its first group of missionaries to British India, among them Adoniram Judson and his wife Ann Hasseltine Judson, to British India.

These Congregationalist ABCFM missionaries, however, were not the first Protestant missionaries in India. British Baptist missionaries had been working in India for some time. On his journey, Adoniram Judson studied the New Testament in anticipation of a theological debate with the British Baptist missionaries on the matter of infant baptism versus believer's baptism. However, Adoniram Judson came to conclusion that the Baptist notion of believer's baptism was indeed correct and converted to Baptism along with his wife. Upon arrival in Calcutta, the couple Adoniram and Ann Judson resigned from ABCFM and underwent full-body immersion baptism. British Indian Government, however, expelled all these American missionaries from India due to the War of 1812. Adoniram and Ann Judson went to settle in Rangoon, Lower Burma, reaching Rangoon in 1813, while Luther Rice, who also converted to Baptism, returned to the United States to rally financial support for the Judson Mission in Burma, leading to foundation of Baptist Missionary Convention or the Triennial Convention in 1814.

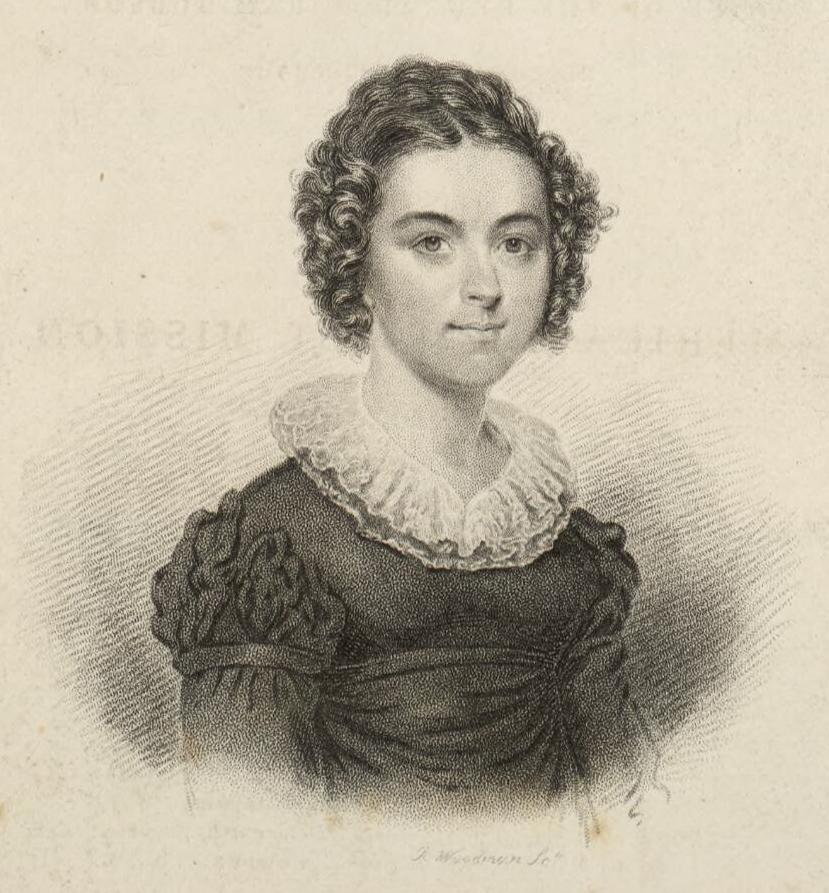
Ann Hasseltine Judson, a Baptist missionary, arrived in Rangoon with her husband Adoniram Judson in 1813 in their Burma Mission. Ann was the first American missionary to learn Thai language.

In Rangoon, Adoniram Judson learned the Burmese language in order to preach and to translate the Bible. Meanwhile, his wife, Ann Hasseltine, encountered the Yodaya people or the Siamese people that had been captured by the Burmese during the Fall of Ayutthaya in 1767 and deported to Burma. Ann became interested in the Thai language in 1817 and began to translate some Burmese tracts into Thai. In 1817, Adoniram Judson finished his Burmese translation of the Bible and two years later, in 1819, his wife Ann translated the Gospel of Matthew into Thai, the first known Protestant translation of any parts of the Bible into Thai language, despite the fact that Ann had never visited Siam herself. This Thai version of Gospel of Matthew, the oldest printing in Thai script, was printed by the Baptist Mission at Serampore, who cast the first movable Thai-script typeface. These Thai typefaces were moved to Singapore under London Missionary Society in 1823, who printed Thai Christian tracts. During the First Anglo–Burmese War, Adoniram Judson was imprisoned by the Burmese authorities out of suspicion of him being a British spy. The pregnant Ann Judson walked tirelessly to obtain the release of her husband. At the end of the war, Adoniram was released but Ann died in October 1826. Adoniram then moved to Moulmein in the British-controlled Mon State.

Christian Church and Mission in Siam had long been dominated by the French Catholic missionaries since the seventeenth century. Two Protestant missionaries; Jacob Tomlin from London Missionary Society and the German Lutheran Karl Gützlaff, arrived in Bangkok in 1828, the first ones to arrive in Siam. Their main goal, however, was the survey and experimental work on the Chinese people in Bangkok before their anticipated mission in China. Tomlin and Gützlaff managed to convert a Chinese man named Bunti or Boon Tee. Tomlin and Gützlaff also made a preliminary translation of the New Testament into Thai language, bringing with them Thai Christian tracts printed at Singapore. As their stay in Siam was short, before their departures, Tomlin and Gützlaff wrote to both the ABCFM at Canton (Guangzhou) and to the Baptist Judson Mission at Moulmein, asking for Protestant missionaries to come to Siam. David Abeel of the Dutch Reformed Church, of the ABCFM from Canton, arrived in Bangkok in 1831, taking care of Bunti and converting more Chinese men, a total of six Chinese converts. However, illness and unfamiliar tropical climate compelled Abeel to leave Siam. John Taylor Jones, who was from New Ipswich, New Hampshire, was ordained as a Baptist missionary in Boston and set sail from Boston with his wife Eliza Grew Jones to Moulmein, Burma to join the Judson Baptist Mission, reaching his destination in February 1831.

By the early nineteenth century, American traders began to venture into the Far East. Edmund Roberts, an American merchant, pointed out to the government that American trade in the Far East had been in a neglected state due to the United States not having acquired preferential treatment from the Asian states in the same manner as other Western nations. President Andrew Jackson then appointed Edmund Roberts in January 1832 as the American 'special agent' to obtain free trade and the Most Favored Nation treatment, meaning that the Americans would be accorded rights and privileges no less than other Western nations, from Oman, Siam and Vietnam. The Secretary of State Edward Livingston drafted the treaty for Roberts. Edmund Roberts set sail from Boston with sloop-of-war USS Peacock in March 1832 for Asia. After his failure in negotiation with Vietnam, Roberts and the Peacock arrived at the river bar of the Chaophraya River on February 18, 1833.

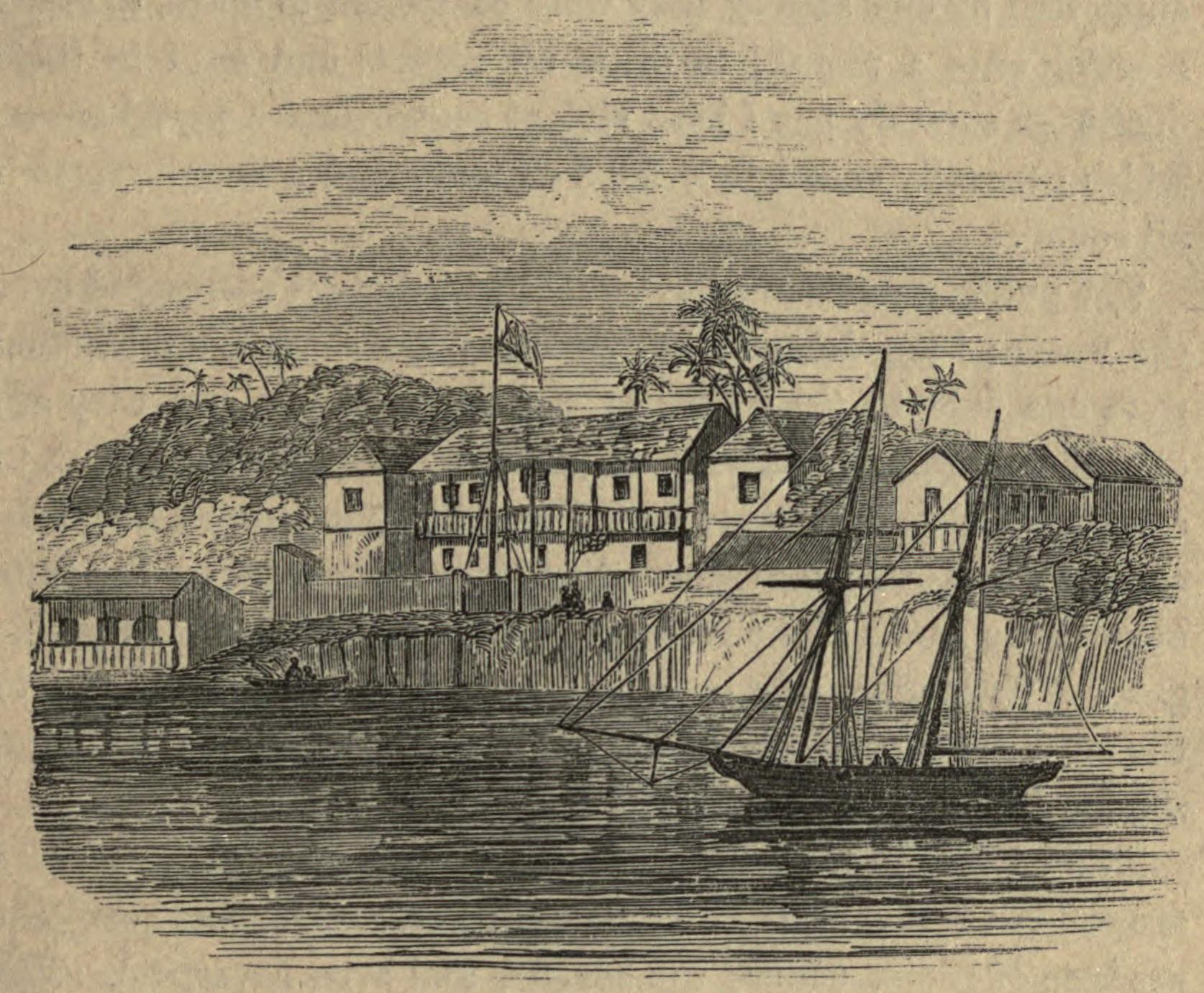
Western-style mansion called British Factory was constructed by Robert Hunter in 1826 on the land rented from Siamese court in modern Thonburi district. This mansion would accommodate English-speaking envoys up to Sir John Bowring in 1855.

As the Siamese still did not know English language, the Siamese court heavily relied on the Portuguese as interpreters for any English-speaking agents. Due to the Siamese being preoccupied with other issues, only on February 24 that the Phrakhlang sent Luang Surasakhon Josef Piedade or José da Piedade, a native Portuguese born in Bangkok, as the interpreter to lead Edmund Roberts from Samut Prakarn to Bangkok. As the American warship Peacock stayed anchored at the river bar, Roberts embarked on a Siamese warship to ascend upstream the river, reaching Bangkok on February 26. Roberts was arranged to reside at the British Factory belonging to Robert Hunter, an influential Scottish merchant in Bangkok. Upon arrival, Roberts was set to meet Chaophraya Phrakhlang Dit Bunnag, the same Siamese Foreign Minister who had earlier concluded the Burney Treaty in 1826.

In 1832, Adoniram Judson at Burma sent the couple John Taylor Jones and Eliza Jones as Baptist missionaries to Siam. From Singapore, the Jones couple and their adopted son the twelve-year-old Samuel J. Smith of Indo–British mixed ethnicity arrived in Bangkok in late March 1833 with the schooner Reliance belonging to Robert Hunter. Edmund Roberts had the Jones live with him at Hunter's British Factory. John Taylor Jones reached out to Bunti, the leader of the group of Chinese Protestant converts in Bangkok. Jones then performed full-body baptism in the Chaophraya River for Bunti and two other Chinese men, the first immersion baptism ever performed in Siam. John Taylor Jones and his wife Eliza became first Protestant missionaries to stay in Siam for a long time, establishing the Baptist Mission in Siam, which John Taylor Jones called "a little Bap church".

=== American–Siamese Roberts Treaty of 1833 ===
Language barrier was the most tiresome challenge for Edmund Robert's mission in Siam. All of Roberts' speech and communications with the Phrakhlang and the Siamese court had to go through Portuguese translators. Even though the Secretary of State Livingston had provided Roberts with a treaty draft, Phrakhlang Dit Bunnag told Roberts that the Siam's treaty with the United States would be exactly the same as the preceding Anglo–Siamese Burney Treaty of 1826 but there was not even the English-language version of the treaty kept in Siam. Phrakhlang read the Burney Treaty in Siamese language. Luang Surasakhon Piedade the interpreter then translated the treaty into Portuguese and then into English for Roberts to hear. Roberts then made his own proposals to the Phrakhlang;

- Most Favored Nation treatment; if Siam reduced duties or charges for any other Western nations, American merchants coming to trade in Siam would also be granted the same reduction.
- Establishment of American Consulate in Siam; the United States would appoint a Consul to Siam to judge and settle disputes concerning American subjects in Siam, the extraterritorial jurisdiction.

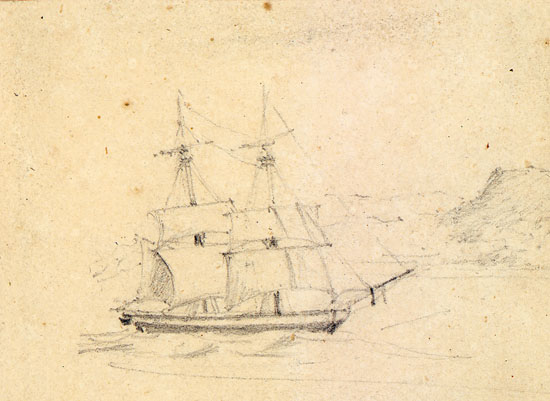
1838 Sketch of sloop-of-war USS Peacock, on which the American envoy Edmund Roberts embarked to Bangkok to conclude the American–Siamese Roberts Treaty in 1833

Phrakhlang Dit Bunnag agreed to the Most Favored Nation notion but vehemently rejected appointment of American Consul to Siam, saying that Siam would allow such Western nation to appoint Consuls to Siam only when that Western nation had substantially come to trade in Siam. The British envoys had also proposed consular appointment and Phrakhlang rejected such proposals with this same rhetoric. Roberts countered that Siam had already allowed Portugal to have a Consulate in Bangkok. Phrakhlang then expressed his disappointment that, despite Siam allowing Carlos Manuel da Silveira to be the Portuguese Consul in Bangkok, not a single Portuguese merchant ship had come to trade. Roberts backed down and compromised that only when Siam allowed any other Western nations apart from Portugal to have Consuls in Siam that the United States would be automatically permitted to appoint a Consul.

On March 18, 1833, Edmund Roberts the American envoy was granted a grand audience with the Siamese king Rama III or King Nangklao at the royal palace. Roberts and the rest of his retinue were transported on riparian vessels to the palace, where Roberts rode on a palanquin carried on the shoulders of eight Siamese bearers to reach the Throne Hall. Ten large elephants and lines of Siamese soldiers received Roberts. Roberts was then admitted into the Amarin Winitchai Throne Hall to see the Siamese dignitaries "lay prostate, or rather on all fours resting on their knees and elbows, with hands united and head bowed low, all the princes and nobility of the land". The curtains then opened, revealing King Rama III sitting on the high throne under white tiered-umbrella. Roberts bowed to the Siamese king three times and sat on the floor on a red carpet in Asian stooping position. King Rama asked few questions to Roberts. The king's speech in Siamese language was interpreted into Malay, Portuguese and English for Roberts to hear. Roberts' conversation to the king was also conveyed in the same manner vice versa.

As Roberts did not know Siamese language and the Siamese also did not know English, intermediary languages were required. Phrakhlang requested that the treaty should also be done in Chinese characters and Robert asked the same for Portuguese language. The historic American–Siamese Roberts Treaty was signed on March 20, 1833. The treaty was made in four languages; Thai, Portuguese, Chinese and English. The reason for concluding the treaty in these languages was given as "as the Siamese are ignorant of English, and the Americans of Siamese, a Portuguese and a Chinese translation are annexed". Difficulties soon arose when translation mistakes were discovered. The Portuguese translation had to be edited and the Chinese translation had to be wholly rewritten. Only on March 30 that all translations were agreed. After conclusion of the treaty, Edmund Roberts, on the sloop-of-war Peacock, left Siam on April 6, 1833.

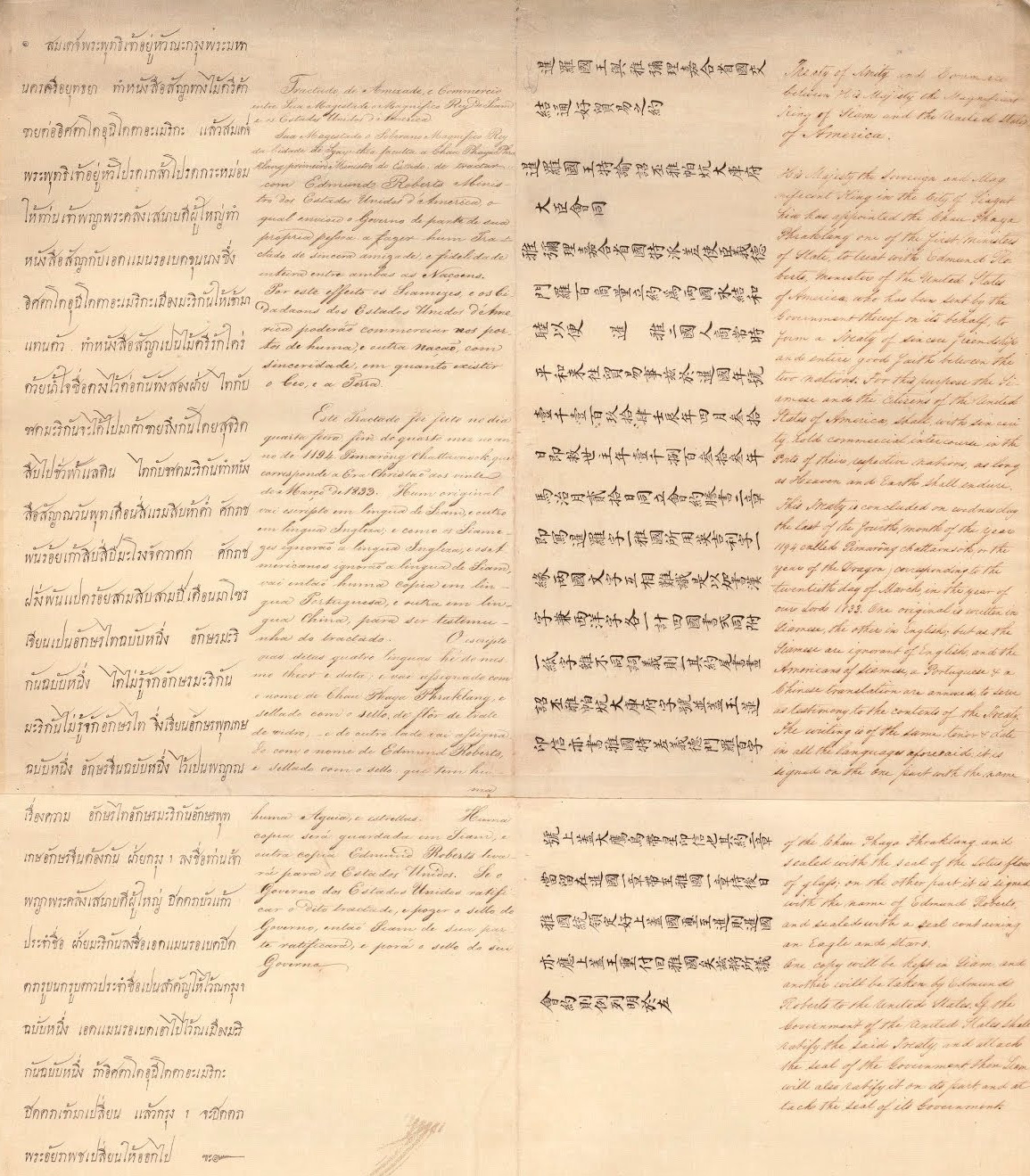
The American–Siamese Roberts Treaty of 1833 was made in four languages; from left to right: Thai, Portuguese, Chinese and English.

The terms of this Roberts Treaty were mostly taken from the Livingston draft and were also mostly the same as the preceding Anglo–Siamese Burney Treaty. Incoming American merchants were granted free trade, being allowed to trade anywhere with anybody in Siam without having to go through the Phra Khlang Sinkha, abolishing the Siamese royal monopoly for the Americans, as in Article II; "The Citizens of the United States shall have free liberty to enter all the Ports of the Kingdom of Siam, with their cargoes, of whatever kind the said cargoes may consist; and they shall have liberty to sell the same to any of the subjects of the King". American merchants were subjected to one single measurement duty that would be paid according to the measured width of the ship. The rate was also the same as the British, that was, 1,700 ticals per Siamese fathom in breadth, in Article III.

For the first time, a Most Favored Nation clause was included in a treaty that Siam concluded with Westerners. Article IV of this Roberts Treaty stated that "If hereafter the Duties payable by foreign vessels be diminished in favour of any other nation, the same diminution shall be made in favour of the vessels of the United States." For jurisdiction over American subjects in Siam, Siam asserted that American merchants in Siam were subjected to traditional Siamese law and judiciary in Article IX; "Merchants of the United States, trading in the Kingdom of Siam, shall respect and follow the laws and customs of the country in all points." However, this term only dealt with the merchants, leaving out the Americans of other professions, for example, the missionaries. Article X of the treaty stipulated that, if Siam permitted any other Western nations to have Consul in Siam than Portugal, the United States would also be granted the same permission; "If thereafter any foreign nation other than the Portuguese shall request and obtain His Majesty's consent to the appointment of Consuls to reside in Siam, the United States shall be at liberty to appoint Consuls to reside in Siam".

After concluding another treaty with the Imamate of Muscat in September 1833, Edmund Roberts brought the Siamese Treaty to the United States, arriving in Boston in April 1834. President Andrew Jackson ratified Roberts' Treaty with the Great Seal in January 1835. In March 1835, the President assigned Edmund Roberts to return to Asia to bring the ratified treaties to exchange ratifications with Muscat and Siam, also to conclude treaties with Japan and Vietnam. Edmund Roberts departed from New York City on USS Peacock in April 1835 on his another diplomatic mission to Asia.

=== Role of Dan Beach Bradley in Siam ===
King Rama II's eldest son was Prince Chetsadabodin, who was born to a secondary consort and had a leading role in the government. Mongkut and Chuthamani were born to the chief queen but were younger. When a royal white elephant died, a bad omen, King Rama II ordered his son the twenty-year-old Mongkut to become a Buddhist monk but the king died a week later in 1824. Given his experienced administrative roles, Chetsadabodin ascended the Siamese throne as King Rama III or King Nangklao. Mongkut stayed in monk robes to avoid succession conflicts. Mongkut would remain in monkhood for twenty-seven years until his own ascension in 1851.

Prince Chuthamani, soon given the princely title Kromma Khun Itsaret Rangsan, younger brother of Mongkut, was the first Siamese dignitary to learn the English language. Chuthamani reportedly learned English from the British merchant Robert Hunter and the American missionaries to pursue his interest on Western-style shipbuilding. When Tomlin and Gützlaff arrived in Bangkok in 1828, Prince Chuthamani had already known some English and desired to learn more. American missionaries David Abeel and John Taylor Jones also taught the English language to the prince. Enlightenment and Westernization of the Siamese elites in early-to-mid nineteenth century depended on the knowledge of the English language because such modernizing influences came from the English-speaking British and Americans. During the mission of Edmund Roberts to Siam in 1833, Prince Chuthamani, called "Chow-Pha-Noi" or "Mom-fa-Noi" ("The Younger Chaofa") secretly visited USS Peacock to observe warship design and naval exercise.

Due to the ongoing war with Vietnam, the Siamese king Nangklao tasked Chaophraya Phrakhlang Dit Bunnag to construct fortifications and warships at the coastal port of Chanthaburi in Eastern Siam. Dit Bunnag's son, Chuang Bunnag, also studied the English language and Western shipbuilding. Chuang Bunnag held the title of Luang Nai Sit as a royal page. At his house in Bangkok, Chuang Bunnag had an English sign "This is Luang Nai Sit's house – welcome friends". Chuang Bunnag built the first native-Siamese-made square-rigged vessel, the schooner Ariel, at Chanthaburi in 1834 and also built the ship Conqueror in 1835. Chuang Bunnag also helped Prince Chuthamani build his first Western-style vessel the barque Fairy in 1836. Prince Chuthamani (Prince Itsaret) and Luang Nai Sit Chuang Bunnag cooperated as enthusiasts of shipbuilding and Anglophone culture.

Protestant missionaries in Siam differed from their preceding Catholic counterparts in that the Protestants usually arrived in couples with their wives and placed emphasis on Bible study, distributing tracts and translating the Bible into local native language. Printing and the printing press were, therefore, instrumental to the Protestant Mission. After the departure of Edmund Roberts from Siam, the Baptist Mission, John Taylor Jones and his wife Eliza, rented a place near the Portuguese Consulate in present-day Bang Rak near the Bangkok Chinatown, to evangelize among the Chinese people. John Taylor Jones was the main pioneer of complete translation of the New Testament into Thai language. William Dean, another Baptist missionary, arrived in 1834. William Dean specialized in the Teochew language to preach on the Teochew Chinese people in Bangkok.

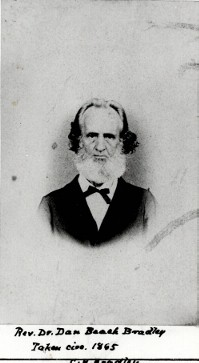
1865 Portrait of Dan Beach Bradley the American Protestant medical missionary in Bangkok. He was known for his introduction of Western medicine, vaccination, printing and publishing into Siam.

Dan Beach Bradley was born in Marcellus, New York, in 1804. Bradley principally pursued medicine, graduating from Physicians College of New York in 1833. After his encounter with Christian revivalist Charles Finney, who influenced his theology on Christian perfection and holiness, Bradley became interested in Protestant Mission, ending up marrying Emilie Royce and embarking on his mission to Siam under the Congregationalist American Board (ABCFM), who had already sent two missionaries Charles Robinson and Stephen Johnson to Siam. Dan Beach Bradley and his wife departed from Boston in July 1834 and reached Bangkok a year later in July 1835. The Thai-language printing press at Singapore, previously belonging to London Missionary Society, had been taken over by the American ABCFM. Bradley brought this ABCFM's Thai printing press from Singapore with him to Bangkok on his arrival. This printing press would print for both Baptist and Congregationalist Missions in Bangkok.

Dan Beach Bradley, who was more of a physician than a missionary, established his infirmary, handing out medicines as well as Christian tracts. Bradley gained popularity and became a sensation among the Siamese elites, who flocked to try the newly introduced Western medicine. In October 1835, Chuang Bunnag took the American missionaries John Taylor Jones and his wife Eliza, Stephen Johnson and Dan Beach Bradley, on board his brig Ariel to go on an excursion trip to Chanthaburi. On his first visit to the Prince-Monk Mongkut in April 1836, Bradley pointed out that Mongkut had been suffering from a stroke, leaving Mongkut with hemifacial paralysis. Bradley also discussed with Prince Itsaret (Prince Chuthamani) about the traditional Siamese postpartum practice of laying by the fire. Phrakhlang Dit Bunnag permitted Bradley to settle and live in Kudichin in modern Thonburi district near Robert Hunter's British factory.

Edmund Roberts the American Envoy, who had earlier concluded the American–Siamese Treaty of 1833, brought the treaty that had been ratified by the United States government back to Siam to exchange ratifications, reaching Bangkok in April 1836 with USS Peacock. Roberts was received by the Portuguese interpreter Luang Surasakhon Piedade in the same manner as his previous visit. The Siamese court received the ratified treaty with solemnity, treating the treaty paper as a divine object, which was carried on a silver tray on the golden throne of the gilded riparian barge. Roberts had another audience with King Rama III on April 16 and the Siamese administrative seals were imprinted on the treaty on April 18. Edmund Roberts left Bangkok on April 20, going on his mission to conclude treaties with Japan and Vietnam. However, Roberts and the whole crew of the Peacock contracted an illness from Bangkok. When the Peacock arrived in Danang, Roberts was too ill to negotiate anything. Edmund Roberts eventually died at Macau on June 12, 1836.

Smallpox had been a deadly infectious disease in Siam. There were two ways to get immunized against smallpox. They were inoculation with live smallpox pus, which could lead to actual lethal smallpox infection and Jennerian vaccination using the vaccines derived from cowpox, which was safer but appeared to be less effective. Upon arrival in Bangkok, John Taylor Jones, who had already been vaccinated, inoculated himself with smallpox pus but ended up getting infected with smallpox and fell sick. In late 1836, Bradley in Bangkok received a batch of smallpox vaccine from the United States and began the first-known vaccination in Thailand by injecting children but the vaccines failed to produce the desired pustule lesions. Bunti, the long-time leader of the Protestant Chinese converts, left the Baptist Church in late 1836 with discontent. When Reverend Howard Malcolm, a delegate of the Baptist Board for Foreign Missions, visited the Baptist Mission in Bangkok, only three Chinese Protestants remained in the church. With Malcolm's presence, John Taylor Jones and William Dean took this opportunity to declare official establishment of Baptist congregation in Bangkok in July 1837. Eliza Jones, wife of John Taylor Jones, died in Bangkok in March 1838.

Upon learning that Bradley had safely inoculated children of American missionaries with smallpox pus, the Siamese king Rama III or King Nangklao initiated the smallpox inoculation campaign in 1838. In January 1839, Prince Wongsa Dhirajsnid the Royal Physician came to discuss with Bradley. Native Siamese physicians had to learn the inoculation technique from Bradley. Smallpox inoculations were carried out extensively among the Bangkokians through 1839 and continued into 1840, the first-known immunization campaign for Thai people, without any fatalities. By 1839, Siamese traditional establishment had accepted Western medicine. Even Prince Wongsa Dhirajsnid distributed quinine tablets against malaria. Meanwhile, another batch of smallpox vaccine arrived and Bradley took them out to vaccinate people but the vaccines again failed so the Siamese stuck to inoculation. Bradley then experimented with local smallpox vaccine production from cowpox, composing Treatise on Vaccination in Thai language on how to produce smallpox vaccine for safer immunization. However, Bradley's experiment failed and his eight-month-old daughter died from smallpox in December 1842.

=== Introduction of Western sciences by American missionaries ===
By the 1840s, the exciting period was over. American missionaries mistook the interest of Siamese elites on Western science as a sign that Siam would become a Christian nation but the Siamese readily filtered out Christianity. Only a handful of Teochew Chinese people in Bangkok converted to Protestantism. The missionaries instead became middlemen for the Siamese to learn about Western civilization. A large number of American missionaries died or left shortly after their arrival and their children usually died young due to hostile tropical climate and prevalent diseases. Jesse Caswell from ABCFM, a Vermonter, arrived in Bangkok in January 1840 with his wife Anna Hemenway.

Abolition of Siamese royal monopoly for the British and the American merchants by the Burney Treaty of 1826 and the Roberts Treaty of 1833, respectively, caused a great loss of revenue to the Siamese royal court. King Rama III or King Nangklao, the Siamese king under whose reign the two treaties were signed, made up for the revenue loss through the system of tax farming, in which Chinese merchants would compete for tax farms on specific commodities, which were only to be handled by such tax farmers. These tax farms were essentially reimposition of royal monopolies, depriving Western merchants of any profits. No American merchants came to trade in Siam after 1838.

British prevail over Qing China in the aftermath of the First Opium War and the resulting Treaty of Nanking of 1842 shook the Sino-centric order that Siam had been relying on. William Dean, the Baptist missionary who had been preaching on the Chinese in Bangkok, published First Lessons in the Tie-chiw Dialect in 1841 but left Bangkok for Hong Kong next year in 1842. In 1843, John Taylor Jones the Baptist missionary, after years of efforts, completed and published the Thai-translated version of New Testament. John Hassett Chandler or J.H. Chandler, another Baptist missionary, arrived in Bangkok in 1843 as a mechanic missionary, bringing a new printing press for the Baptist Mission with him. The 1844 Sino–American Treaty of Wanghia (望廈條約) allowed American access to Chinese treaty ports, resulting in a large number of Chinese-focused American missionaries in Siam moving to China in this period.

Impactful event came when King Nangklao, out of fear of possible British invasion of Siam, ordered through Hunter a steamship. Robert Hunter was the influential British merchant in Bangkok who had been the king's favorite. Hunter brought steamship Express to Bangkok in 1844 but attempted to sell to the king at an inflated price so the king refused to buy the steamship. The Siamese populace, among them the shipbuilders Prince Itsaret and Chuang Bunnag, were astonished by the engine-powered iron-clad vessel, first of its kind ever to arrive in Siam. Robert Hunter verbally insulted the king for refusing to buy his steamship and threatened to sell it to Vietnam, the archenemy of Siam. King Nangklao then expelled Robert Hunter from Siam and seized his British Factory. Robert Hunter left Siam in December 1844, ending his twenty-year mercantile career in Bangkok.

This Robert Hunter incident steered King Nangklao and his court towards an isolationist, anti-Western sentiment during the last years of his reign. However, top Siamese elites continued to have positive views of the West. Jesse Caswell's expertise on astronomy attracted attention of the Prince-monk Mongkut, also known as Chao Fa Yai ("The Elder Chaofa"), who shared similar interests. Caswell wrote The Almanac and Astronomy, which was translated into Thai by Bradley and published in January 1843, which became popular among the Siamese. Caswell provided lectures on science and astronomy as a new approach to present the Gospel to the Siamese elites. Upon his arrival in Siam, the Baptist mechanic missionary J.H. Chandler also brought an engine lathe with him, which was purchased by the Prince Itsaret. Realizing that the era of the wind-powered sailing vessels was over, the shipbuilder prince Itsaret, in concert with Chandler, established a machine shop in 1844 outside the walls of his residence Thonburi Palace next to Chaophraya River, with the goal to build the first engine-powered steamship in Siam.

In June 1845, the Prince-monk Mongkut, who was then abbot of the prestigious Wat Bowonniwet Temple, invited Jesse Caswell to teach the English language to Mongkut and other monks of the temple in exchange for Caswell being granted a rent-free place adjoining the temple to preach and to distribute books. Jesse Caswell began his first English class for Mongkut on July 1, 1845, and continued to teach for eighteen months. In August 1845, however, Bradley's wife Emilie died. Dan Beach Bradley and Jesse Caswell had been preaching about sinless Christian perfection in life against the Calvinist doctrine, in which a Christian would never be purified in his lifetime until being glorified by God at death. Charles Robinson, another ABCFM missionary in Bangkok, reported to the Prudential Committee of ABCFM at Boston in 1845. The ABCFM then decided in 1846 to dissolve its mission in Siam, prompting Charles Robinson to leave Bangkok but Robinson soon died of illness.

Under Chandler's tutelage, Prince Itsaret completed his first steam engine in 1846. After four years of efforts, the first native-Siamese-made small steamship, made by Prince Itsaret, was finished in 1848. On the American Independence Day, the Fourth of July, 1848, Prince Itsaret or Prince Chaofanoi took his steamship to sail in the Chaophraya River for the first time, with the prince himself at the helm steering the ship. Completion of this first Siamese steamship by the Siamese prince was reported on the Singapore Free Press on 19 October 1848 and made all the way to the New York Tribune on April 7, 1849, under article A Royal Siamese Machinist.

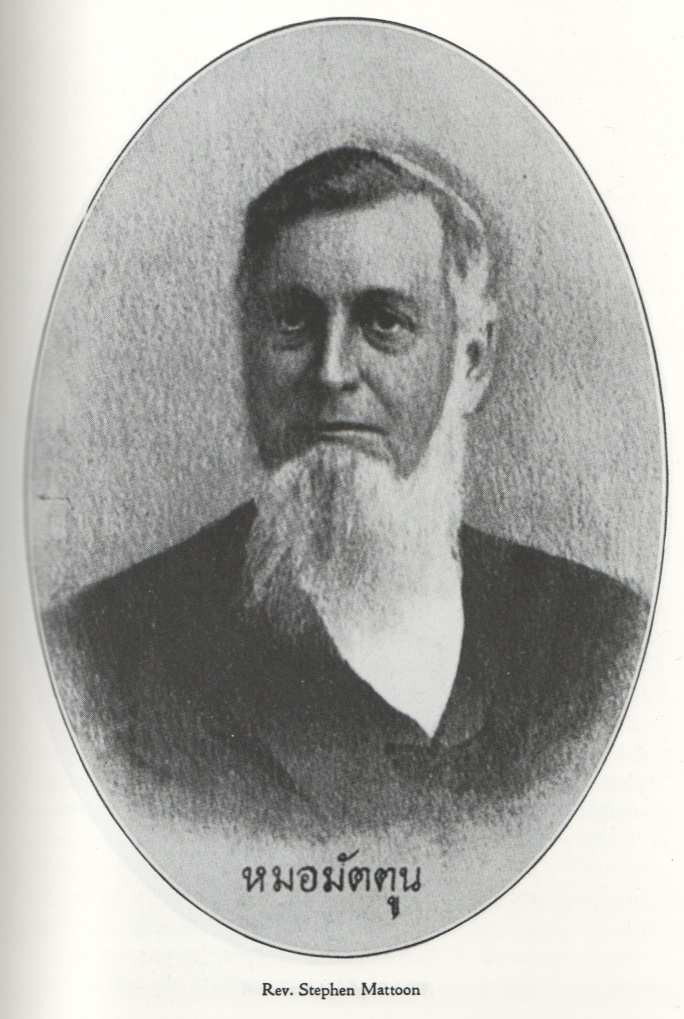
Stephen Mattoon the American Presbyterian missionary arrived in Bangkok in March 1847. Mattoon later served as the U.S. Consul to Siam from 1856 to 1859.

Dan Beach Bradley took his children from Bangkok to Boston in February 1847 to resign from the ABCFM and to find a new sponsor. Stephen Mattoon and Samuel Reynolds House from the Presbyterian Board of Foreign Missions, both Upstate New Yorkers, arrived in Bangkok in March 1847. Mattoon graduated in theology from Princeton University, while House graduated from the Physicians College of New York, the same medical college as Bradley. Mattoon and House took over the vacated place of Bradley in Kudichin. Mattoon studied Thai language and began a new Thai translation of the New Testament, while House carried on Bradley's medical mission.

Jesse Caswell died of erysipelas in Bangkok in September 1848. Mongkut mourned Caswell's death and regarded Caswell as his English teacher. Before the departures of Caswell's widow Anna and Caswell's son Francis, Mongkut wrote to Francis; "I think of your father mostly as he was my teacher of English. I wish you to keep this my note with you for my remembrance. Your father's Pupil T.M. Chaufa Mongkut". Meanwhile, Bradley met Sarah Blanchly, a graduate from Oberlin College in Ohio and married Sarah as his second wife in November 1848. Bradley eventually joined the abolitionist American Missionary Association (AMA) and set sail in October 1849 to return to Siam with Sarah.

The cholera epidemic hit Bangkok in June 1849, killing around 40,000 inhabitants. People died within a few hours of showing symptoms. Floating dead bodies clogged waterways and in some houses there were more dead bodies than the living ones. Presbyterian missionary Samuel Reynolds House came out to treat patients but contracted the disease himself. The Siamese king Nangklao ordered a general Buddhist merit-making by releasing domesticated animals to appease the Karma. American missionaries considered this animal release to be an idolatry. Chuang Bunnag told the American missionaries that this animal release was not a religious ceremony but rather a celebration on the abatement of the disease so the Americans consented to send animals for the king to release. After the epidemic, in August 1849, Mattoon and House proclaimed the first Presbyterian Church of Siam, with House elected as the ruling elder.

=== Balestier and Brooke Missions to Siam (1850) ===
Joseph Balestier, a Martinique-born, naturalized as an American citizen, had been the first American Consul to Singapore since 1836. After premature death of the American envoy Edmund Roberts, Joseph Balestier offered himself in 1838 as the successor to Roberts as Special Agent to oversee American interests in the region. Balestier left Singapore to return to the United States in 1848, where he pointed out to the Secretary of State John M. Clayton that no progress had been made to further American interests, in contrast to the rise of British and French influence, in that region. Balestier urged that the United States should present itself as a powerful nation or else it would fall behind Western peers. For his efforts, the government, under Zachary Taylor presidency, appointed Joseph Balestier as Special Agent in August 1849 to conclude new treaties with Siam and Vietnam.

Siam's tax farms and the Chinese tax farmers were unpopular among British Singaporean traders, who, through the 1840s, sent numerous petitions to the British Indian Government, complaining that the Siamese court had violated the Burney Treaty, which stipulated that the British would trade in Siam without interferences of any middlemen. Anglo–Siamese relations had been deteriorating since the Robert Hunter Incident of 1844. In 1848, the Singapore Chamber of Commerce petitioned to the British Foreign Office at London complaining about Siam's new monopoly and the high measurement duties. Even commercial associations of Liverpool and Manchester urged the British Foreign Office to mend relations with Siam. Under pressure from these petitions, in December 1849, the British Foreign Secretary Lord Palmerston assigned Sir James Brooke the Governor of Labuan and the Rajah of Sarawak, who was then in Penang, to go to Singapore to settle these issues.

Departing from British Hong Kong in February 1850, Joseph Balestier took USS Plymouth under command of Commodore Philip F. Voorhees the newly appointed commander of U.S. East India Squadron. Balestier also took William Dean, the Baptist missionary who used to preach in Bangkok, as his interpreter to go on his diplomatic mission. Balestier's bid with the Vietnamese Nguyen dynasty at Danang from February to March 1850 was unsuccessful, however. Meanwhile, Sir James Brooke arrived in Singapore in March 1850 to receive Palmerston's instructions. Brooke was tasked with procuring a new favorable trade treaty from Siam, while also acquiring extraterritorial jurisdiction for British subjects in Siam without provoking any hostile reactions. As his mission was delayed, Brooke preliminarily sent a letter on HMS Nemesis to inform the Siamese royal court at Bangkok about his imminent arrival.

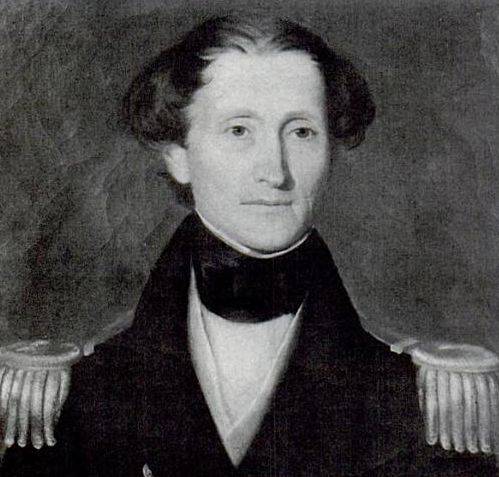
Philip F. Voorhees, commander of U.S. East India Squadron and USS Plymouth, accompanied Joseph Balestier in diplomatic mission in March 1850 to Siam, where he refused to go to Bangkok out of fear of deadly cholera outbreak.

Joseph Balestier and his retinue on USS Plymouth arrived at the river bar of Chaophraya River on March 24, 1850, where they found the British warship Nemesis already anchoring. Upon learning about the recent deadly cholera epidemic in Bangkok, Commodore Voorhees refused to go further, even though the American missionaries affirmed Balestier that the cholera had dissipated. Chameun Waiworanat Chuang Bunnag brought the same Siamese schooner that had earlier received Edmund Roberts seventeen years earlier, accompanied by Presbyterian missionary Stephen Mattoon, to receive Balestier on April 2. Commodore Voorhees saluted the Siamese elephant flag with 21-gun salute and refused to disembark, leaving only Balestier, William Dean and a Chinese assistant, a total of three people, to ascend to Bangkok. Voorhees' refusal to go to Bangkok greatly offended the Siamese.

Joseph Balestier, in his Siamese mission, was assigned to abolish or reduce the measurement duties for American merchants in Siam and to secure Siamese consent to the appointment of American Consul in Bangkok. Balestier reached Bangkok on April 4 to reside in a reception house specifically built to accommodate him near Robert Hunter's former British factory. The Siamese requested that the presidential letter should be inspected and translated by Siamese officials to be presented to the king but Balestier refused, intending to hand the letter directly to the king per Western diplomatic protocol. Chaophraya Phrakhlang Dit Bunnag the Siamese Foreign Minister, the usual receiver of foreign envoys, was away conducting conscription tattooing in Southern Siam so his younger brother Phraya Siphiphat That Bunnag and his son Chuang Bunnag received Balestier. Unlike the previous Roberts mission of 1833, Balestier had a plethora of American missionaries in Bangkok as his interpreters.

Joseph Balestier met Phraya Siphiphat and other Siamese trade officials in a conference on April 9, 1850, where American missionaries the Baptist John Taylor Jones, his adopted son Samuel J. Smith, William Dean and the Presbyterian Stephen Mattoon served as interpreters. Phraya Siphiphat was shocked by the sight of the American envoy Balestier arriving alone with an umbrella held underarm not followed by any honorable retinue but Samuel J. Smith, who carried the casket containing the presidential letter. Siphiphat greeted Balestier with usual Siamese hospitality by asking about Balestier's journey, which Balestier found irrelevant and cut short by demanding an audience with the King of Siam. Balestier handed a small note from his pocket explaining his mission to Siphiphat and handed over the bare paper of presidential letter to Siphiphat, explaining that this letter came in a sandalwood box with gold lock in proper manner. Siphiphat, however, complained that Balestier's credentials and protocol were not correct. Enraged, Balestier stood up and asked whether or not Siphiphat would accept the presidential letter, to which Siphiphat replied that the presidential letter would be transmitted to the king but the audience would not happen because Balestier's mission was not according to court etiquette. Balestier then stormed out of Siphiphat's mansion.

Phrakhlang Dit Bunnag returned to Bangkok on April 12. Joseph Balestier attempted to reopen the negotiation by sending a letter to the Phrakhlang accusing his younger brother Siphiphat offending him as the representative of the President of the United States. Dit Bunnag did not reply and Balestier gave up, sending another letter to the Phrakhlang on April 18 requesting a riparian barge to escort him out of Bangkok. American missionaries gathered their signatures in a letter consoling Balestier, saying that Balestier had done his best and blaming Siamese obsession with ceremonies and display. Balestier's failure to impress the Siamese with pomp, his inability to adapt to Siamese protocol and his bad-tempered actions doomed his mission in Siam. Joseph Balestier returned to the Plymouth and left Siam on April 24, 1850, without having the presidential letter delivered nor having any audiences with the Siamese king.

Dan Beach Bradley returned to Bangkok with his new wife Sarah in May 1850. Three months after the departure of Joseph Balestier, Sir James Brooke the British envoy, who was the representative of British Foreign Office rather than the East India Company, who had already had a negative view on the Siamese court, arrived at the river bar on 9 August 1850 with HMS Sphinx to join HMS Nemesis already there. Brooke met Phrakhlang Dit Bunnag the Siamese Foreign Minister at Samut Prakarn and told the Phrakhlang that Siam had earlier concluded the Burney Treaty with East India Company and Siam should conclude a new treaty directly with the British government. As the British warships were stuck at the river bar, Sir James Brooke was escorted by Siamese vessels to ascend to Bangkok, reaching Bangkok on August 23, where Brooke refused to reside in Balestier's reception house and instead stayed at Hunter's British factory.

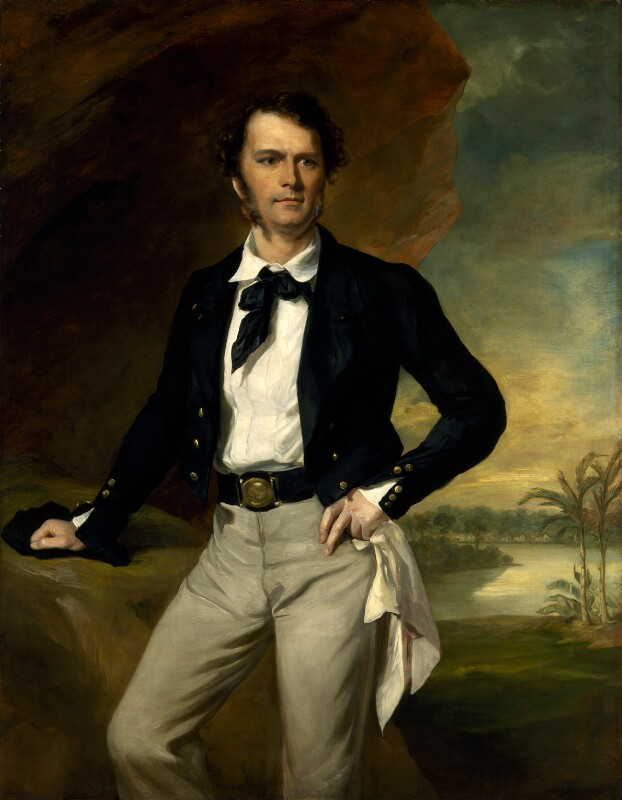
Sir James Brooke the Governor of Labuan and Rajah of Sarawak led an unsuccessful British mission to renegotiate the 1826 Burney Treaty with Siam, worsening the Anglo–Siamese relations.

Siamese sentiment turned cold when they knew that Brooke had come to ask for reduction of the duties. Brooke then wrote a nine-article treaty proposal to the Phrakhlang including the right of residence for British subjects anywhere in Siam, establishment of British consular authority, extraterritorial jurisdiction for the British, invoking the principle of free trade. Siamese ministers discussed about Brooke's treaty proposal, with the American John Taylor Jones providing translations and replied through Phrakhlang that Siam had found no benefits of allowing Western nations to have consulates, invoking the example of Portugal and saying that disputes should be settled by the laws of the countries they were in. Phrakhlang also cited Robert Hunter as the reason why Siam did not want more British people.

Brooke–Siam negotiation broke down when Brooke asked for reduction of the measurement duties, to which the Siamese angrily replied that they had already reduced the said duties from 2,200 ticals to 1,700 ticals per fathom at the request of Henry Burney in 1826, prompting Brooke to reply that perhaps the Siamese ministers "should have forgotten the gravity of advanced age". As all his proposals were rejected, enraged, Brooke openly declared that Siam had violated the Burney Treaty. Brooke even offered all Western missionaries in Bangkok a steamer to transport them to Singapore due to the prospect of an Anglo–Siamese War. Brooke also observed that, despite the king opposing his proposals, he was discreetly supported by the pro-Western princes, presumably the Princes Mongkut and Chuthamani. Sir James Brooke left Siam empty-handed on 28 September 1850, without obtaining any treaties nor any audiences with the Siamese king. Anglo–Siamese relations reached the nadir as British attack on Siam became likely.

== Bowring Treaty ==
=== Ascension of King Mongkut ===
Sir James Brooke's failed negotiation during August–September 1850 to conclude a treaty with Siam in British terms and Siamese rejection of British demands put the Anglo–Siamese relations in the worst state, with the British Navy at Singapore seriously considering sending warship to Siam and the Siamese royal court anxiously prepared for a possible British assault. Brooke wrote to the British Foreign Secretary Lord Palmerston in October 1850 that Siam "may now be taught a lesson which it has long been tempting", also suggesting a gunboat diplomacy to seize Bangkok. However, Brooke also maintained hope on the Prince-monk Mongkut, who was known for his appreciation of Western civilization and was the younger half-brother of the incumbent king Rama III or King Nangklao. Perhaps the prospect of ascension of a Western-friendly monarch in Siam served to keep the British away from actually attacking Siam.

King Nangklao fell terminally ill in January 1851. Chaophraya Phrakhlang Dit Bunnag the Siamese Foreign Minister, who, by the end of the reign, had become the most powerful mandarin in court, sent his two sons Chuang Bunnag and Kham Bunnag in March 1850 to Wat Bowonniwet Temple to invite the Prince-monk Mongkut to take the throne. Mongkut insisted that, however, he would take the throne only if his younger brother the shipbuilder Prince Chutamani or Kromma Khun Itsaret Rangsan also ascended as his co-ruling second king. King Nangklao died on 2 April 1851. Mongkut had the American Baptist missionary John Taylor Jones publish an article on Singapore Free Press announcing that Mongkut the new king of Siam had liberal sentiments and reforms should be anticipated, also deploring Sir James Brooke to return to Siam to resume negotiations. Brooke, however, was obliged to return to Britain in May 1851 to face the charges of excessive violence against the natives of Borneo.

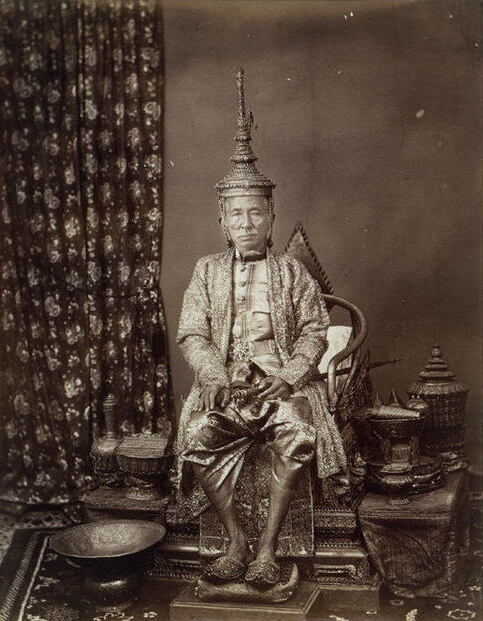
King Mongkut of Siam ascended the throne in April 1851 with support of the Bunnag family. He appointed the Bunnags to highest positions in government.

After twenty-seven years in Buddhist monkhood, Mongkut ascended the throne as King Rama IV in May 1851 with his younger brother also taking the dignity of co-ruling Second King, becoming the Vice-King Pinklao and taking residence at the Front Palace. As Mongkut ascended the throne with the support of Bunnag family, he appointed the Bunnags to high ministerial positions;

- Chaophraya Phrakhlang Dit Bunnag the Siamese Foreign Minister responsible for the Burney Treaty of 1826 and the Roberts Treaty of 1833 was appointed as Somdet Chaophraya Prayurawong the King's Regent kingdom-wide, also known as Somdet Chaophraya Ong Yai or the Elder Somdet.
- Phraya Siphiphat That Bunnag the younger brother of Dit Bunnag, who had earlier received the American envoy Joseph Balestier in 1850, was appointed as Somdet Chaophraya Phichaiyat the King's Regent in Bangkok, also known as Somdet Chaophraya Ong Noi or the Younger Somdet.
- The shipbuilder Chuang Bunnag, son of Dit Bunnag, was appointed Chaophraya Si Suriyawong the Samuha Kalahom or Prime Minister of the South.
- Kham Bunnag, other son of Dit Bunnag, younger half-brother of Chuang Bunnag, was appointed Chaophraya Rawiwong as the new Phrakhlang or Siam's Foreign Minister.

Mongkut invited American missionaries and other foreigners to observe his enthronement procession. During a public audience, Mongkut told the missionaries "Fear not" to pursue what they had been doing. The new reign marked the change of Siamese attitude towards the West. New men in high positions, especially the younger Bunnags, were progressive. Upon his ascension, Mongkut erected a monument over the grave of the American missionary Jesse Caswell, who had earlier taught him the English language and had died in 1848, in remembrance of Caswell as his English teacher. By the time of Mongkut's ascension, there were three American Protestant missions in Bangkok;

- The Baptist Mission at Maitrichit Church in modern Bangrak led by John Taylor Jones, who had arrived in Siam in 1833, his adopted son of Indo–British mixed ethnicity Samuel J. Smith and the mechanic missionary J.H. Chandler. William Dean had left for Hong Kong in 1842. Earlier in January 1851, however, a fire broke out at the Baptist Mission, during which the printing press and books were destroyed. J.H. Chandler went to the United States in 1851 to urge the American government to make another attempt to conclude a new treaty with Siam. William Ashmore arrived in April 1851 to preach on the Chinese.
- The Presbyterian Mission in Kudichin, led by Stephen Mattoon and the medical missionary Samuel Reynolds House.
- The Congregationalist mission of the American Missionary Association (AMA) led by Dan Beach Bradley. However, the AMA only provide moral support not financial support so Bradley had to take printing as his full-time job in Bangkok.

Mongkut was also more open about new commercial treaties with Western powers in accordance with Western principles. Mongkut had Chuang Bunnag write several letters to Brooke at London, urging Brooke to return to Siam to resume negotiations. Lord Palmerston the British Foreign Secretary, upon learning of ascension of a Western-leaning king in Siam, planned to send Sir James Brooke to Siam. However, in mid-1851, Mongkut decided to ask to postpone the incoming Brooke's mission due to Siamese government being preoccupied with the funeral of the late king Nangklao. Brooke also found himself unable to return to Siam for his legal charges in London so any British missions to Siam had to be postponed indefinitely as Brooke would never return to Siam.

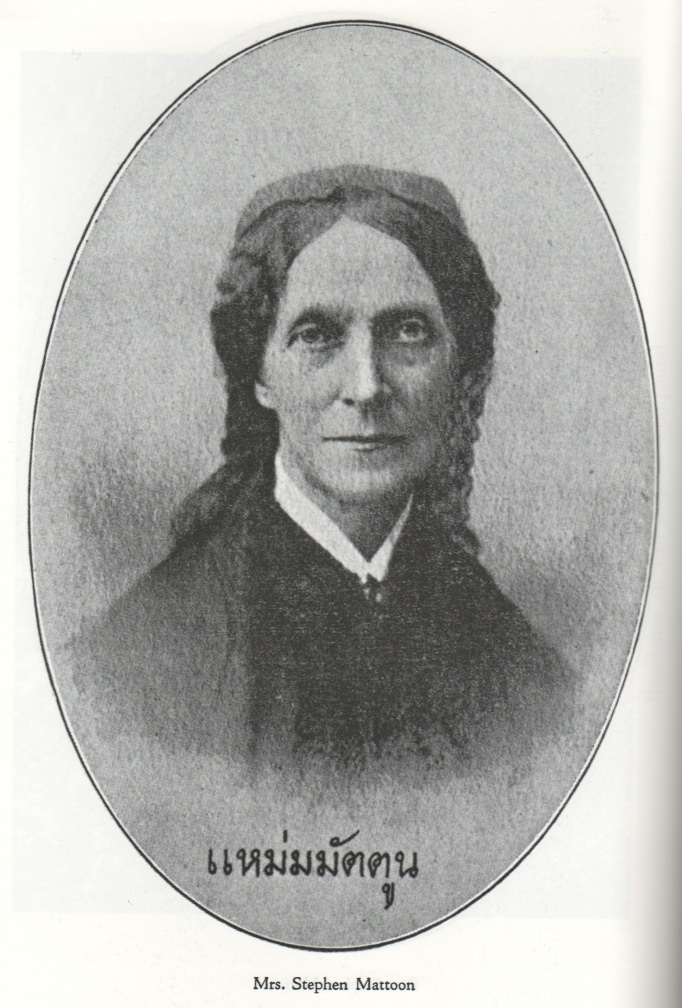
Mary Mattoon, wife of Stephen Mattoon, was one of the three American missionary women who taught the English language to court ladies and daughters of King Mongkut during 1851–1854. She later founded a school to teach local Siamese girls.

In August 1851, King Mongkut requested the three Protestant Missions to send missionary women to teach English to royal ladies in the woman's quarters of the royal palace, where men were forbidden to enter. The Baptist Mission sent Sarah Sleeper Jones, wife of John Taylor Jones. The Presbyterian Mission sent Mary Mattoon, wife of Stephen Mattoon. And the AMA Mission sent Sarah Bradley, wife of Dan Beach Bradley. John Taylor Jones, however, died in September 1851, eighteen years after his first arrival in Siam. In January 1852, King Mongkut assigned American physicians Dan Beach Bradley and Samuel Reynolds House, along with his younger half-brother the Royal Physician Prince Wongsa Dhirajsnid, to take care of a consort and her premature newborn princess, the first daughter of Mongkut, in the inner palace, where men were usually forbidden to enter. Bradley had earlier published Treatise on Midwifery in Thai language in 1842. Also in February 1852, the Prince Wongsa himself had Bradley tended to his consort during a difficult labor.

Funeral of King Nangklao was completed in April 1852. In July 1852, King Mongkut sent envoys to Beijing to ask for formal investiture from the Chinese Emperor per traditional practice. Mongkut's envoys reached Hong Kong in August and was well received by John Bowring the British Consul in Canton and the acting Governor of Hong Kong. Mongkut then wrote a letter in English to Bowring, inviting Britain to cultivate relations with Siam. This was the first encounter between Mongkut and Bowring. Gaining the king's favor, Bradley was granted by Mongkut a new place in Bangkok Yai for Bradley's AMA mission and his printing press, prompting Bradley to move from Kudichin, his original place, to his new place in 1852. Bradley and House were also assigned to tend Queen Sommanat, Mongkut's first queen, who died of postpartum complications in October 1852. The Queen's death affected the reputation of Western physicians but the Vice-King Pinklao helped them by appointing Bradley as his personal physician. Prince Wongsa studied Western medicine under Bradley and House and was elected as a Corresponding Fellow of the New York Academy of Medicine in 1853 under the name "Prince Viromma Luang Wang-se Tirat Sanik", even receiving an American medicine diploma through proxy.

=== American opening of Tokugawa Japan ===
American New England whalers had established "Japan Ground" as their whaling ground in the 1820s. The concept of Manifest Destiny had been pushing the Americans to the frontiers of Oregon Territory, Canton (Guangzhou) and Mexico. The United States was keen on maintaining its trade with China at a comparable level to Britain. After the British prevailed in the First Opium War, the United States concluded the Treaty of Wanghia with Qing China at Macau in July 1844, which was the American counterpart of the British Nanking Treaty and granted American access to five treaty ports. In the aftermath of the Mexican–American War and Treaty of Guadalupe Hidalgo in 1848, American territories reached the Pacific. The Chinese trade, whaling, and acquisition of American West Coast led to an increased presence of American sailing vessels in the Far East, which also led to occasional shipwrecks in the area that needed local assistance. The Far East became a new frontier for the Americans.

American merchant ship Morrison under Charles W. King attempted to contact Japan in 1837, leading to the Morrison Incident, during which the Morrison was attacked by Japanese cannon fires.

The Americans, however, could not rely on Tokugawa Japan as a friendly local due to Japan's Sakoku or seclusion policy. In 1842, in response to the Opium War, Japan allowed Western ships to resupply provisions from Japan but any foreigners arriving in Japan would still be imprisoned. By 1846, there were about seven hundred American whaling ships in the Japanese Seas. Successive commanders of U.S. East India Squadron were assigned to deal with Japan. James Biddle led a diplomatic mission with two warships and the presidential letter to Edo Bay (modern Tokyo Bay) in July 1846 but was turned away. American shipwreck castaways of the whaling ships Lawrence (1846) and Lagoda (1848) were imprisoned in Nagasaki by Japanese authorities. In 1849, David Geisinger sent James Glynn to successfully obtain the release of the Lagoda whalers detained at Nagasaki. In the aftermath, Geisinger presented a report to the House of Representatives in 1850, portraying the Japanese as cruel and unreasonable.

After these failed missions to establish contact with Japan, also after Joseph Balestier's failed mission to conclude new treaties with Siam and Vietnam in 1850, the United States began to consider political and strategic terms, not only commercial terms, of its policy in the Far East. San Francisco the "golden gate to trade with the Orient" was the new unique gateway to the Far East, instead of going through Europe and Suez. Advent of the engine-powered steamships facilitated Trans-Pacific journey even more, bringing East Asia closer to California. Secretary of State Daniel Webster came up with the idea of a chain of coal supply stations for American steamships from the West Coast to Asia and Japan was considered, in Webster's words, "the last link of the chain of oceanic steam-navigation".

John H. Aulick succeeded Philip F. Voorhees as the new commander of East India Squadron in 1851. In March 1851, a group of Japanese shipwreck survivors arrived in San Francisco. Aulick then proposed to Webster that he would return these Japanese sailors to Japan as a pretext of benevolent gesture to establish relations with Japan. President Millard Fillmore granted Aulick, in June 1851, full powers to conclude a treaty with Japan. However, Aulick quarreled with his colleagues on his journey and was consequently relieved of his mission to Japan. The president replaced Aulick with Matthew C. Perry, a distinguished naval officer with experiences of naval warfare and diplomacy, known for his role in the Mexican–American War, who had also been advocating for conversion of U.S. Navy to steam power and acquisition of American outposts in key locations in Asia.

Perry was appointed as the new commander of the East India Squadron in March 1852 and was also assigned the mission to establish relations with Japan. President Millard Fillmore wrote a letter to the Emperor of Japan that "The United States of America reach from ocean to ocean, and our Territory of Oregon and State of California lie directly opposite to the dominions of your imperial majesty. Our steamships can go from California to Japan in eighteen days" and "there is a great abundance of coal and provisions in the Empire of Japan. Our steamships, in crossing the great ocean, burn a great deal of coal". Perry departed from Norfolk, Virginia, in November 1852 with the steam frigate USS Mississippi.

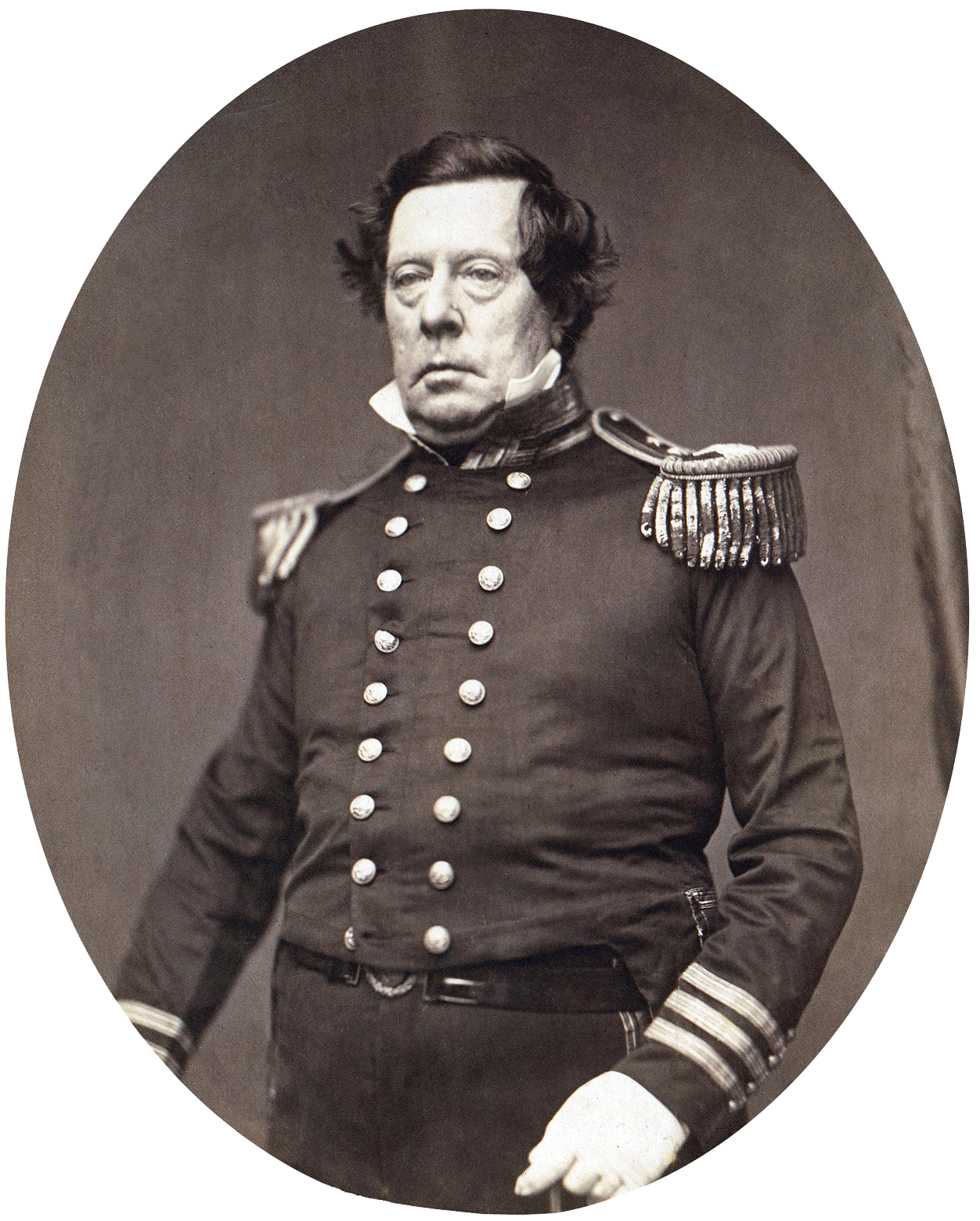
Matthew C. Perry, who was known for his opening of Japan from seclusion and the Convention of Kanegawa, came into contact through letters with the Siamese Second King Pinklao during 1853–1854.

Japan, however, was not Perry's only goal as he had been appointed with extensive powers to visit any Asian nations. By the time that Perry reached Galle in British Ceylon in March 1853, Franklin Pierce had become the new President of the United States. Simultaneously, King Mongkut had sent some Siamese Buddhist monks on the Siamese square-rigged sailing ship Favorite, earlier built by Chuang Bunnag in 1842, to go on a pilgrimage in Ceylon. In Galle, Perry met with the captain of Favorite and complimented that the ship Favorite was "one of beautiful form and construction". Perry wrote a letter to gift a Colt pistol to Pinklao the Second King of Siam, saying that Pinklao's reputation in America for scientific knowledge made him a fitting recipient of the weapon; "The renown which your highness has acquired in America for your attainments in every branch of science induces me to place at your disposal this trifling gift of Mr. Colt." and "I hope that you will send one of your ships of Siam to America", also thanking Siam for kindness to the late Edmund Roberts during his visits.

Matthew C. Perry continued his journey to fetch another warship USS Susquehanna at Shanghai in May 1853, where Perry met the American merchant in China Townsend Harris, who, like many other Americans, attempted to insert himself into Perry's historic mission to Japan but failed. Perry departed from Shanghai and reached Uraga Harbor in July 1853 with his two steam frigates USS Mississippi, USS Susquehanna and two sailing sloops-of-war USS Plymouth and USS Saratoga, which were called "Black Ships" by the Japanese. Unlike Biddle in 1846, Perry adopted a threatening stance to impose direct pressure on the shogunate at Edo (modern Tokyo). The shogunate sent officials to deal with Perry and attempted to divert the ships to Nagasaki but to no avail. Perry managed to deliver the presidential letter and left Japan for a time being, returning to Hong Kong.

The Second King Pinklao wrote a reply letter to Perry in September. In October 1853, Perry wrote to the American missionaries in Bangkok, urging them to secure a favorable reception for him upon his anticipated arrival in Siam and assigning them to tell the Siamese government that he promised to assist any Siamese ships going to the United States. In December 1853, Perry sent another letter to Pinklao, informing that he would be visiting Siam next summer with his East India squadron. Kalahom Chuang Bunnag replied that Perry should not bring more than two or three warships to Bangkok or else the Siamese populace would panic.

The British Foreign Secretary George Villiers the 4th Earl of Clarendon renewed the project of concluding a new treaty with Siam. Lord Clarendon appointed Sir John Bowring in January 1854 as the British plenipotentiary to conclude new commercial treaties with the three Asian nations of Japan, Siam and Vietnam. Clarendon, in his instructions to Bowring, prioritized Japan. Perry returned to Japan in February 1854 with even more warships including USS Powhatan, leading to the signing of the Convention of Kanagawa in March, in which the Japanese shogunate government opened Shimoda and Hakodate as treaty ports for American trades, properly assisted the American shipwreckers, not to mistreat nor imprison them and granted the Most Favored Nation status to the United States. Also in March 1854, Pinklao wrote to Perry acknowledging his upcoming visit to Siam.

=== The Straits Times Incident (1854) ===
In August 1852, Brigham Young the President of the Church of the Latter Day Saints sent off Mormon missionaries to preach around the world. Elam Luddington, an American Mormon missionary going to Siam, reached Singapore in March 1854, where he met an English Captain James Trail, who was commanding a barque Sirius trading under venture of the Siamese king Mongkut. At Singapore, Captain Trail fired gun salutes during a ball of his merchant friend, prompting William Butterworth the British Governor of the Straits Settlements at Singapore to inform Mongkut about Trail's misconduct. Elam Luddington boarded on Captain Trail's ship Sirius to arrive in Bangkok in April 1854, where Luddington allegedly converted and baptized Captain Trail to Mormonism. However, Captain Trail was soon arrested and incarcerated in Siamese prison for his misconduct in Singapore. After being imprisoned for about two months, through intercession of American missionaries, Captain Trail was pardoned and released by around June, reinstated to his former command but Mongkut required Trail to go to bathe himself in a sacred pond in Ayutthaya to repent his guilt.

The Baptist missionary J.H. Chandler, who had been in the United States since 1851, returned to Siam with the new Baptist missionary Robert Telford, reaching Paknam Samut Prakarn in June 1854. However, luggage of Chandler and Telford were held at Paknam for custom clearance. Another Baptist missionary Samuel J. Smith came down from Bangkok to retrieve the luggage but the Siamese custom officials at Paknam refused to release any unopened luggage that had not been inspected and Smith did not bring the keys with him, leading to an altercation between Smith and the Siamese officials at Samut Prakarn. News of this incident reached King Mongkut, who issued a new order forbidding all missionaries to venture out from Samut Prakarn, causing consternation among the American missionaries, who found their movement restricted as it had been their habit to go out of Paknam for summer retreat. In anticipation of Perry's visit, the Siamese had a chain laid across the Chaophraya River at Paklat (modern Phra Pradaeng) to prevent Perry's warships from going upstream to Bangkok.

In Bangkok, Elam Luddington the Mormon missionary attempted to preach but was rejected by both the Siamese and the Westerners. In July 1854, an unknown irate Westerner in Bangkok wrote a letter to the British newspaper press The Straits Times at Singapore, informing about the disappointed state of Westerners in Siam towards the new reign. According to the letter, Siam had not progressed as the Westerners had been expecting. The letter criticized Mongkut on many issues including the focus on taxation, recounting that the king had been obsessed about searching all incoming luggage at Paknam, the failure of the Siamese military expedition to Kengtung and the monetary fines imposed by officials on people for incorrect use of Thai word for shrimp paste. The letter also recounted the episode of imprisonment of Captain Trail in Siam. Luddington eventually left Siam in August 1854 on the same ship Sirius with Captain Trail, who vowed to "get even" with the Siamese government for the treatment he had received.

Upon his return from Japan to Hong Kong, in August 1854, having accomplished his mission in Japan, Matthew C. Perry decided to relinquish his position as U.S. East India Squadron commander and gave up his promised visit to Siam, citing the depletion of coal supply as his reason. The letter criticizing King Mongkut was published on the British newspaper The Straits Times at Singapore on 12 September 1854. Mongkut suspected the Baptist missionary Samuel J. Smith as the mastermind of this article because Smith was the protagonist of the earlier episode of altercation with the custom officials at Paknam. Mongkut threatened to expel all the American missionaries from Siam, except for Bradley and House. Mongkut also stopped the missionary ladies from further teaching in the Inner Palace.

Mongkut then had Chaophraya Si Suriyawong Chuang Bunnag gather all the American missionaries at his house to ask the missionaries whether they were the instigators of such article and to ask them to sign a document declaring that the offensive The Straits Times article was untrue, to which the missionaries refused to comply because they found the article to be partially true and signing such document would imply that they were responsible for the article – the accusation that they denied. The missionaries then wrote their own paper declaring that their conditions had improved under Mongkut. This incident negatively affected the position of the Americans in Siam. Relations between Mongkut and the American missionaries, which had been fostered for many decades, were strained to a great extent.

In December 1854, King Mongkut held a celebration for completion of the newly excavated Phadung Krung Kasem Canal as the outer Bangkok city moat. When Mongkut went on a tour along this new canal, he saw a Western-style house built closer to the edge of the canal than the regulation allowed. When he found out that this house belonged to Smith, Mongkut became enraged, forbidding all American missionaries from going downstream from Bangkok or they might be shot by Siamese officers. Mongkut also declared that if any American missionaries found ships to leave Siam he would be glad to let them go. The relation between the king and the American missionaries was plunged into the lowest state in this incident. House, in his memoir, suspected that Captain Trail was the writer of the letter. Mongkut eventually discovered that it was the Siamese minister Kalahom Chuang Bunnag who had permitted Smith to build the house. Chuang Bunnag was embarrassed by this incident, expressing his dissatisfaction over the whole affair and telling Bradley that during the reign of the previous king (Rama III) there had been a government but at the present there was no government.

=== Bowring Mission to Siam (1855) ===
Even though Sir John Bowring had been instructed by Lord Clarendon to conclude a treaty with Japan first, Bowring saw Japan as being preoccupied with the Americans, who had just coerced the Japanese shogunate government to sign the Convention of Kanagawa in 1854. Previously, in July 1854, King Mongkut of Siam wrote a personal letter in the English language to Bowring at Hong Kong, congratulating on Bowring's recent knighthood and appointment as plenipotentiary to Siam. Sir John Bowring then decided to go to Siam first, expecting a smooth and successful diplomatic venture. Sir John Bowring, the direct representative of British Foreign Office rather than East India Company, led his diplomatic mission to Siam, with Bowring himself as the principal envoy, accompanied by Harry Parkes the British Consul to Amoy and Bowring's own son John Charles, with British steam screw sloop HMS Rattler and the sailing brig-sloop HMS Grecian. Bowring's retinue reached the Chaophraya river bar on 24 March 1855. King Mongkut sent Chaophraya Si Suriyawong Chuang Bunnag down from Bangkok to fetch the British envoys.

Due to the earlier Singaporean newspaper incident, the Siamese government had negative sentiments on the American missionaries. Chaophraya Rawiwong Kham Bunnag the Phrakhlang or Siamese Foreign Minister forbade any American missionaries to make any contacts with these British envoys. Mongkut also sent the Isfahan-born Armenian man named Captain Joseph as an English interpreter to greet Bowring. Captain Joseph told Bowring that most of the Christians in Siam were Catholics and the American Protestant missionaries did not manage to convert many people because the Siamese were more attracted to Catholic rituals. Joseph also told Bowring about the offensive The Straits Times article incident five months ago and Mongkut's ongoing contempt on the American missionaries causing the Phrakhlang to forbid the missionaries from writing any letters or meeting with the British envoys. Harry Parkes objected to Phrakhlang Kham Bunnag, invoking the rights of "unimpeded intercourse", saying that the envoys should be allowed to meet any people in Siam. Kham Bunnag then gave in and consented to Harry Parkes' demand.

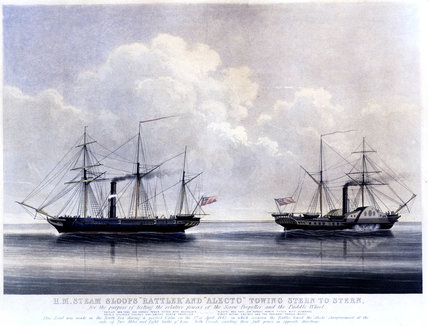
1845 Image of the British steam screw sloop HMS Rattler (left)

Bowring's retinue reached Paknam Samut Prakarn on April 2, where the 21-gun salutes were exchanged between both parties. Kalahom Chuang Bunnag, dressed in British military costume, assigned columns of Siamese soldiers to receive Bowring. Chuang Bunnag did not want the two British warships Rattler and Grecian to ascend to Bangkok for security reasons but Bowring insisted that the warships were parts of his diplomatic retinue. A compromise was reached that only the Rattler was allowed to ascend, while the Grecian was to stay anchored at the river bar all through Bowring's stay in Siam. The Rattler was also permitted to ascend only up to the Pong Patchamit Fort (in modern Khlong San, Thonburi district), which was about three kilometers downstream from the Bangkok Fort, not allowed to approach the Siamese royal palace. The three British envoys Sir John Bowring, Harry Parkes and John Charles Bowring were carried by Siamese riparian barges to reach Bangkok on 4 April 1855. Mongkut assigned Bowring and his retinue to stay at the British Factory formerly belonging to Robert Hunter. Bowring demanded that the Rattler should fire a 21-gun salute in Bangkok per Western diplomatic protocol, also as a display of force. An announcement had to be issued so that the Bangkokians would not panic at the explosive gun salute sounds.

After the 21-gun salute by the Rattler in Bangkok, on the same day of April 4, the British envoys were granted a grand audience with the Siamese Mongkut at Amarin Winitchai Throne Hall in the royal palace. Siamese royal riparian barges carried the envoys to the palace, where Bowring rode on a sedan chair carried on the shoulders of Siamese porters to enter. In the Throne Hall, Bowring, Parkes and John Charles sat on three separate chairs in front of Mongkut sitting on a royal throne, while Siamese princes and officials prostrated on the floor. Bowring presented the gift from Queen Victoria of a golden pendant watch. Bowring then had a conversation with Mongkut, asking the king who spoke English most proficiently in Siam, to which Mongkut replied that Captain Joseph the Armenian man spoke English best and the American missionaries also spoke good English. Mongkut then asked Bowring about the discovery of Neptune. After the audience, on April 8, King Mongkut appointed four Siamese commissioners to conclude a treaty with Bowring;

- Somdet Chaophraya Prayurawong Dit Bunnag, previously the chief negotiator of Burney (1826) and Roberts (1833) Treaties, also called Somdet Chaophraya Ong Yai or the Elder Somdet
- Somdet Chaophraya Phichaiyat That Bunnag, younger brother of Dit Bunnag, who had earlier received Joseph Balestier in 1850, also called Somdet Chaophraya Ong Noi or the Younger Somdet
- Chaophraya Si Suriyawong Chuang Bunnag, eldest son of Dit Bunnag, whom Bowring called Phra Kralahom
- Chaophraya Rawiwong Kham Bunnag, other son of Dit Bunnag, the Phrakhlang or Siamese Foreign Minister

Mongkut soon added his younger half-brother the Royal Physician Prince Wongsa Dhirajsnid as the fifth commissioner as the representative of Siamese royal family. Kalahom Chuang Bunnag expressed his opinion to Bowring that the antiquated Siamese taxation system, which had been reliant on the ethnic Chinese tax farmers, should be reformed. However, beneficiaries of the old system, most notably his own uncle Somdet Ong Noi That Bunnag, sought to retain the old system and disagreed with concluding a commercial treaty with Britain. Also on April 8, Bowring attended a Protestant religious service with the American missionaries. Dan Beach Bradley told Bowring that the American missionaries had been disappointed at the Siamese king but they did not want to officialize their grievances. The American missionaries recounted for Bowring to hear about the previous incidents of the Baptist missionary Samuel J. Smith going into verbal argument with custom officials at Paknam and the Singaporean newspaper article, resulting in Mongkut restricting their movement, forbidding them to go from Bangkok down to Paknam and beyond, where the missionaries had been going as summer retreat. The missionaries then beseeched Bowring to intercede with the Siamese king on their behalf.

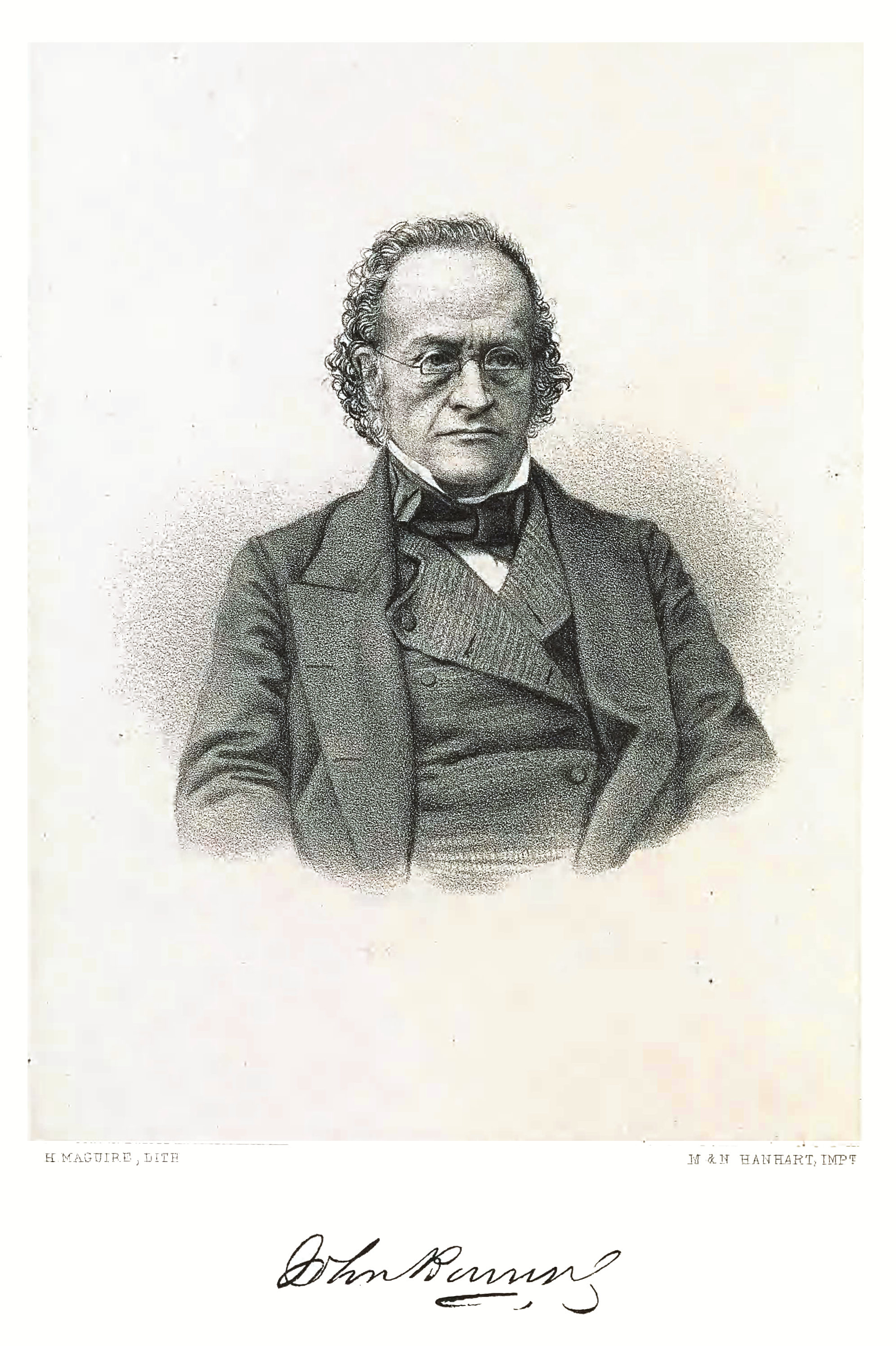
Sir John Bowring the Governor of British Hong Kong arrived in Bangkok in April 1855 as British plenipotentiary to conclude the eponymous Bowring Treaty, also arbitrating the strained relations between American missionaries and King Mongkut.

The three British envoys went to the first meeting at the mansion of the Elder Somdet Dit Bunnag on 9 April 1855, where Sir John Bowring presented his proposals including:

- Permission for British subjects to reside and buy lands in Siam: The Siamese commissioners replied that the British would be allowed to reside and buy lands only within the distance of a 24-hour boat journey from Bangkok but should also be further than four British miles from Bangkok city walls.
- Abolition of the measurement duties, which had been levied according to the breadth of merchant ships, in favor of a general import duty rate of three percent. Somdet Ong Noi That Bunnag vehemently objected to this proposal, while his nephew Chuang Bunnag supported the proposal.
- Extraterritoriality: Britain would appoint Consul to Siam to oversee British subjects in Siam, who would be under British consular jurisdiction instead of traditional Siamese law and judiciary.

Next day, on April 10, the British envoys discussed with Somdet Ong Noi, who seemed to be against their proposals. In the evening of April 10, Chuang Bunnag gave Bowring bad news that the Somdets were likely to reject Bowring's proposals and Chuang himself could not persuade the elders to accede to British demands. Enraged, Bowring threatened to take the warship Rattler to leave Siam immediately. Bowring's threat shifted the power balance towards Chuang, who remarked that Bowring's anger was "well suited to the occasion". Prince Wongsa of the pro-treaty faction called for a conference at his residence the Thonburi Palace. The two Somdets and Phrakhlang Kham Bunnag called in sick so only two Siamese delegates, Prince Wongsa and Chuang Bunnag, attended. Bowring also did not attend himself, sending Harry Parkes and John Charles. These four people, with the Baptist missionary Chandler as interpreter, agreed to all points of the treaty on April 11.

Sir John Bowring went to visit Prince Wongsa at the Thonburi Palace, where Bowring noticed Prince Wongsa's American medical diploma displayed at the palace front door. American missionaries undertook final translation of the treaty, which was presented to King Mongkut on April 16. Mongkut personally compared the English and Thai versions and made corrections with his own hands. On April 17, in a private audience, Bowring told Mongkut that the American missionaries had done a great service to Siam as interpreters and translators and asked Mongkut to lift travel restrictions on the missionaries. Mongkut replied that the travel restriction imposed on the American missionaries served to prevent them from meddling with Siamese politics as one of them had already done. Mongkut also told Bowring that he intended the travel restrictions to be temporary.

Next day, on April 18, Prince Wongsa told Bradley that King Mongkut had lifted all travel restrictions on American missionaries, allowing them to go to Paknam. Bradley and the Americans were more than rejoiced at such news. Six American missionaries, namely Chandler, Bradley, Smith, Mattoon, Telford and Ashmore, jointly wrote a letter to express their gratitude to Sir John Bowring for his role as the arbitrator on their behalf. Bradley personally visited Bowring to thank him. The Treaty of Friendship and Commerce between Great Britain and Siam, also known as the Bowring Treaty, was signed on that same day of 18 April 1855 at the mansion of the Elder Somdet. Twenty-one-gun salutes were exchanged between the Siamese Fort and the British warship Rattler. According to Bowring, Chuang Bunnag, whom Bowring called Phra Kalahom, was instrumental to persuading Siam to accept the treaty.

=== Bowring Treaty provisions ===
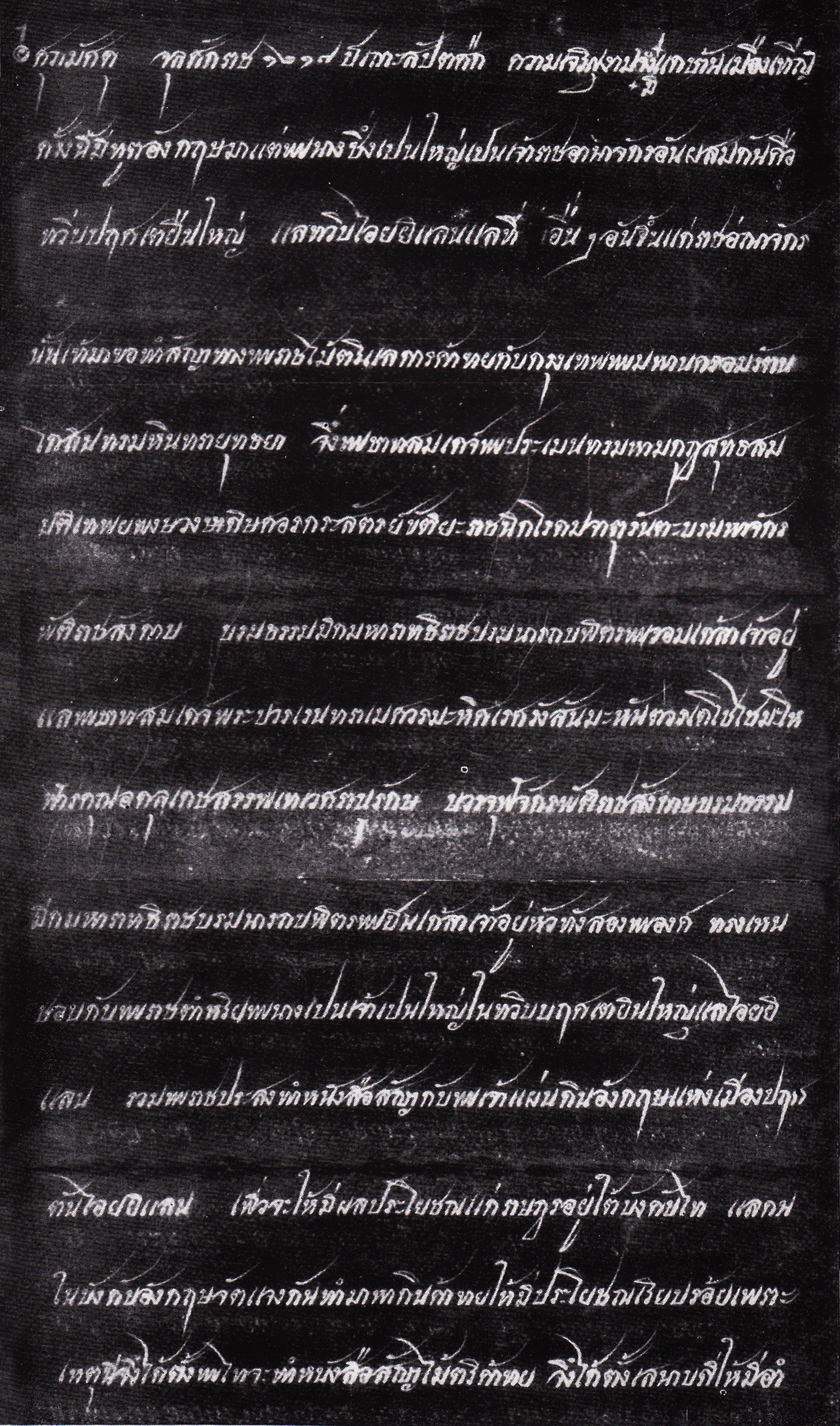
Anglo–Siamese Bowring Treaty of April 1855 became the prototype of unequal treaties that Siam would subsequently conclude with other Western nations.

- Extraterritoriality: Britain appointed Consul to Bangkok to oversee British subjects in Siam. In legal disputes between a British and a Siamese subject, nationality of the defendant determined jurisdiction. If the defendant was a British subject, the case would be judged by the British Consul. If the defendant was a Siamese subject, the case would enter traditional Siamese legal system. However, Article II of this Bowring Treaty still stipulated that the British Consul would 'jointly' oversee British subjects in concert with the Siamese government; "Any disputes arising between Siamese and British subjects shall be heard and determined by the Consul, in conjunction with the proper Siamese officers.". However, Britain could only appoint Consul to Siam only when the treaty had been ratified and ten British merchant vessels had already come to trade in Siam.
- Commerce: Abolition of the measurement duties or tonnage duties fixed by the Burney Treaty of 1826 at the rate of 1,700 ticals per one fathom of the breadth of British merchant ships, replaced by the general import duty of three percent on British-imported commodities, which would be levied Ad valorem only once through the whole trade venture in Siam.
- Travel and Land Ownership: British people were allowed to travel and buy land in Siam only within the designated area, which was the area surrounding Bangkok on all sides at the distance of 24-hour boat journey. Any British subjects desiring to travel beyond this area had to seek permission from the Siamese government through the British Consul. For land ownership, British subjects could only buy and own lands that were far from Bangkok at least for 200 Sen or four British miles, unless such British subjects had been living in Siam for at least ten years or had been specifically permitted by the Siamese government.
- Most Favored Nation status: If Siam were to grant any concessions or privileges not stipulated in this treaty to any other Western nations, the British would be automatically accorded such concessions and privileges; "The British Government and its subjects will be allowed free and equal participation in any privileges that may have been, or may hereafter be, granted by the Siamese government to the Government or subjects of any other nation.".
- The treaty was to come into effect on 6 April 1856, about one year after signing of the treaty.

On the evening of April 18, the Bowring Treaty signing day, Sir John Bowring paid visit to the Second King of Siam Pinklao. The British envoys; Bowring, Parkes and John Charles, had a farewell audience with King Mongkut on 24 April 1855. King Mongkut gave his royal letter to Queen Victoria engraved on a gold plate encased in a box with golden lock and the golden key to Harry Parkes, who would return to England, assigning Parkes to deliver his royal letter to Queen Victoria.

The British envoys left Bangkok and departed from Paknam Samut Prakarn on 25 April 1855 to leave Siam. The American Presbyterian missionary Samuel Reynolds House was also to leave Siam to return to the United States on a furlough on the same occasion. Mongkut gave the Siamese money worth of US$1,000 to House for him to deliver to the family of Jesse Caswell, Mongkut's deceased English teacher, in the United States. Bowring allowed House to leave Siam with the British envoys to Singapore and then continue his journey. Next day, on April 26, Somdet Chaophraya Prayurawong Dit Bunnag, the chief negotiator of the Burney and Roberts Treaties, died from illness, eight days after the signing of the Bowring Treaty. Harry Parkes was assigned to bring the Bowring Treaty to London for ratification by the British government, reaching London in July 1855.

== Harris Mission to Siam ==
=== Appointment of Townsend Harris to Japan and Siam ===
Townsend Harris was born in Sandy Hill, Washington County, New York, in 1804, later moving to New York City to join his family's Chinese ceramics import business. Harris became the president of New York City Board of Education in 1846 and campaigned for free education, leading to establishment of New York Free Academy in 1847. After the death of his beloved mother in 1847, Harris became a merchant and set sail from New York in 1849 to trade in the Far East, taking Penang as his main entrepôt and also trading in Hong Kong and Shanghai. At Shanghai, Townsend Harris attempted to join the historic diplomatic mission to open Tokugawa Japan from seclusion in May 1853 but was refused by Matthew C. Perry. The Convention of Kanagawa, negotiated by Perry with the Japanese shogunate government and signed in March 1854, only addressed preliminary issues including opening of Shimoda and Hakodate ports to American traders and Japanese assistance to American shipwreckers but it had not been a proper Treaty of Amity and Commerce yet. Article XI of the Convention of Kanagawa stipulated that the United States could establish a consulate in Shimoda.

Townsend Harris attempted to make a glorious debut in diplomatic career by applying for position of U.S. Consul to either Canton or Hong Kong. In March 1854, Harris proposed to the Secretary of State William L. Marcy that the United States should purchase Formosa or Taiwan from China to serve as an American coal supply station. President Franklin Pierce appointed Harris as the Consul to Ningpo in July 1854 and appointed John Romeyn Brodhead, a historian, as the U.S. Consul General to Japan in March 1855 but Brodhead did not want to go to Japan. Harris was not satisfied with his new Ningpo Consul position and never set foot in Ningpo. Harris then decided to return to the United States to personally make a bid for a prestigious consulate position in the Far East, leaving Penang in May 1855 and reaching New York in July, returning to New York after six years of trade in Asia. Eight prominent New Yorkers, including Brodhead himself, submitted a recommendation to President Pierce in favor of Harris as the Consul General to Japan. Townsend Harris went to Washington D.C. in July 1855, where he underwent intensive interview and dined with President Pierce. Even though Harris had secured support of Marcy the Secretary of State through his friend Prosper M. Wetmore, the president hesitated. On August 4, 1855, Harris wrote to President Pierce, expressing his strong desire to serve as the U.S. Consul to Japan, stating that he preferred Japan over China and declaring that, as Harris was not married, he would endure isolation and would not request to return home;

I have told Your Excellency that I have long had a strong desire to visit Japan; and so deep has this feeling become that, if I was offered the choice between Commissioner to China or Consul to Japan, I should instantly take the latter.

I have a perfect knowledge of the social banishment I must endure while in Japan, and the mental isolation in which I must live, and am prepared to meet it. I am a single man, without any ties to cause me to look anxiously to my old home, or to become impatient in my new one:

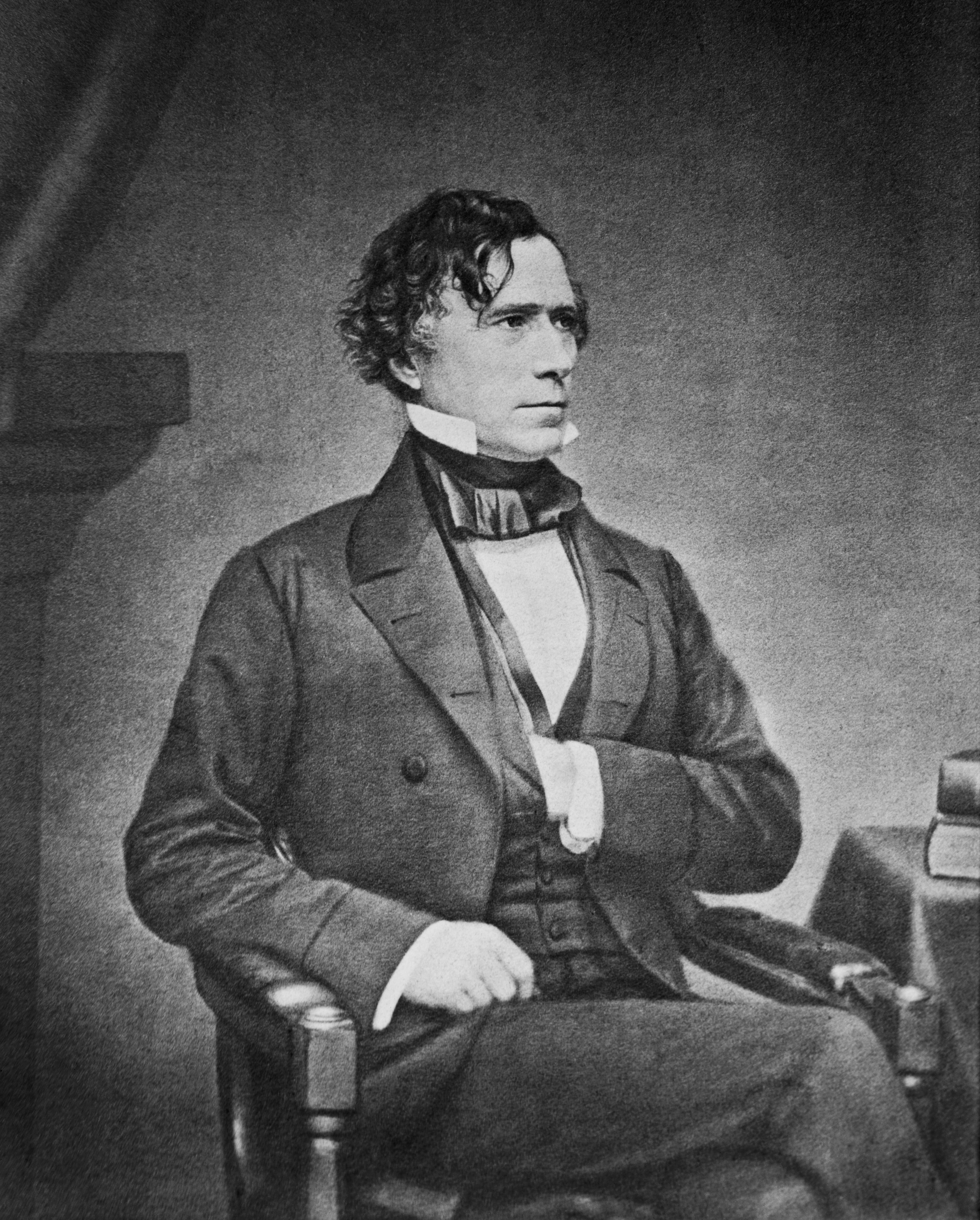
Franklin Pierce the President of the United States appointed Townsend Harris as the U.S. Consul General to Japan and plenipotentiary to conclude the American–Siamese Treaty of 1856.

On that same day, on August 4, President Franklin Pierce appointed Townsend Harris as the U.S. Consul General to Japan. Having accomplished his goal, Harris left Washington D.C. to return to New York. The news of Anglo–Siamese conclusion of the Bowring Treaty in April 1855 reached Harris. On August 21, Harris wrote to Secretary of State William L. Marcy suggesting that, on his journey to Japan, the U.S. East India Squadron should send a steamer to bring him from Singapore to Bangkok to conclude a new treaty with Siam. Harris speculated that only about ten days of his stay in Bangkok would be sufficient for him to conclude the treaty. Harris also suggested that his knowledge of Malay language would enable him to communicate directly with the Siamese without interpreters.

On September 8, 1855, President Franklin Pierce granted two separate instruments of power to Townsend Harris as the American plenipotentiary to conclude new treaties with Japan and Siam. On September 12, President Pierce wrote two letters to the Emperor of Japan and the King of Siam. To Emperor of Japan, President Pierce wrote; "the existing Treaty between the United States and Japan might be so amended as to secure greater facilities for the exchange of the rich and varied productions of Your Majesty’s vast Empire for those of the United States.". To the King of Siam, the president wrote;

Having long been aware of the extent of Your Majesty’s dominions, of the richness and variety of their productions, and of the desire of Your Majesty’s subjects to receive in exchange for them the production of other countries, it has occurred to me that the existing Treaty between the United States and Siam might be so amended as to secure greater facilities for that purpose. I have accordingly made choice of Townsend Harris, Esquire, the Consul General of the United States for the Empire of Japan, and a citizen of this country, who is the bearer of the present letter, to confer upon the subject with such Ministers or other officers as Your Majesty may designate. I trust that they may agree upon the terms of a treaty which will strengthen and perpetuate the bonds of amity between the United States and Siam, as well as increase the commercial intercourse between them to their mutual advantage.

President Franklin Pierce entrusted his two presidential letters to Japan and Siam to Townsend Harris. Secretary of State William L. Marcy gave instructions on Harris' mission to the two countries. For Japan, Marcy assigned Harris to make a new commercial treaty to secure free trade for the Americans in Japan, which might be in the same manner as in Siam; "If, however, its commercial stipulations were to be similar to those which you are instructed to insert in the treaty with Siam, it is believed that they would be sufficient, at least as a beginning.".

For Siam, Marcy assigned Harris to amend the existing American–Siamese Roberts Treaty of 1833 to obtain the same treaty provisions that Siam had conceded to Britain in the Bowring Treaty and to point out to the Siamese that the United States, unlike Britain, had no territorial ambitions in the East; "to show the difference between the foreign policy especially in the East, of this country and Great Britain. While the latter is herself an Eastern Power and as such by the late Burmese war has since become a near neighbor of Siam. We covet no dominion in that quarter." For the matter concerning American missionaries in Siam, Harris was to make sure that they should not be molested, be allowed to preach Gospel freely but also to tell Siam that the Protestant Mission was not connected to the United States government, who would not interfere with Siam's policy on Christianity.

Meanwhile, the British envoy Harry Parkes had brought the Bowring Treaty to the British government at London for approval. The Queen's Advocate saw that the Bowring treaty stipulations were vague, especially on the issue of jurisdiction over British subjects in Siam. Article II of the Bowring Treaty stated that British Consul would hear the cases involving British subjects in Siam "in conjunction with" Siamese officers. The Queen's Advocate suggested that British subjects in Siam should be under exclusive jurisdiction of British Consul without any interferences from the Siamese government. It was also needed to clarify which articles of the preceding Burney Treaty of 1826 would be abrogated by this new treaty and which articles would stay. Eventually, Harry Parkes was assigned, on his return to Siam to exchange ratifications, to renegotiate with Siam to amend and clarify some points of the treaty.

=== Journey of Townsend Harris from New York to Bangkok ===
By 1855, the United States had already had extraterritorial jurisdiction in the Asian nations of Oman (Roberts Treaty, 1833), China (Wanghia Treaty, 1844) and Brunei (Balestier Treaty, 1850). On 10 October 1855, the French Emperor Napoleon III appointed Charles de Montigny the French Consul to Shanghai, who was then in Paris, as the French plenipotentiary to go to Bangkok to similarly conclude a new Franco–Siamese Treaty in the same manner as the Bowring Treaty.

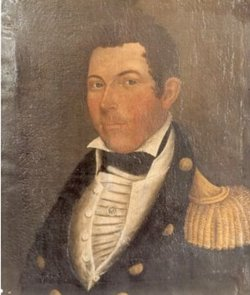
James Armstrong the new commander of East India Squadron, with his flagship USS San Jacinto, joined Townsend Harris' diplomatic mission to Siam during April–May 1856.

Townsend Harris put most of his luggage on the steamer USS San Jacinto, joined by James Armstrong the newly appointed commander of U.S. East India Squadron. This steamer San Jacinto would be his main vessel and also carried gifts for the Japanese shogun and the two Siamese kings. Townsend Harris departed from New York on October 17, 1855, on the mail steamer SS Pacific of the Collins Line to go on his diplomatic mission as the American plenopotentiary to Japan and Siam, crossing the Atlantic Ocean to Liverpool. James Armstrong and USS San Jacinto departed from New York on October 25, 1855, eight days after Harris. Harris and Armstrong were to travel on separate routes, with Harris going through the European route and Armstrong, with the San Jacinto, circumventing the Cape of Good Hope, both expecting to converge at Penang around February 1856.

Harris on the Pacific reached Liverpool on October 28, where he visited some friends before taking train to London next day on October 29. Harris stayed in London for three days and left England at Dover on November 1. On the same day, disembarking at Calais, Harris reached Paris, where he purchased some ornamented clothes to wear at the Siamese royal court. Harris' diplomatic mission coincided with the Crimean War, which rendered transport mail steamers in shortage. Harris left Paris on November 26 to go to Marseilles, where he managed to catch a mail steamer SS Vectis of the British Peninsular Oriental Company on November 29 to reach Alexandria in Egypt on December 4. From Alexandria, Harris took trains to Suez, where he boarded on British steamer SS Bengal of the same company on December 7, 1855. Harris on the Bengal arrived and disembarked at Galle in British Ceylon on December 26. Harris stayed in Ceylon for about three weeks until his departure from Ceylon and arrival in Penang on January 19, 1856, where Harris had to wait for the American warship San Jacinto to join him.

British envoy Harry Parkes, who had been assigned to go to Siam to clarify some issues of the Bowring Treaty, departed from London in January 1856, going through Paris to take a mail steamer at Marseilles to Asia. At Penang, Townsend Harris wrote to Charles William Bradley the U.S. Consul in Singapore asking for a copy of the Bowring Treaty and books about Siam, which Harris would study. Charles W. Bradley offered to bear the American–Siamese Treaty that Harris was going to make back to the United States. Harry Parkes the British envoy arrived in Penang on February 25. Harris met Parkes in Penang, who recounted his previous experience of diplomatic mission to Siam a year earlier in 1855 and gave Harris another copy of the Bowring Treaty. Townsend Harris had been waiting for James Armstrong and the San Jacinto for nearly two months in Penang. Armstrong and his flagship arrived in Galle on March 6, more than a month behind schedule.

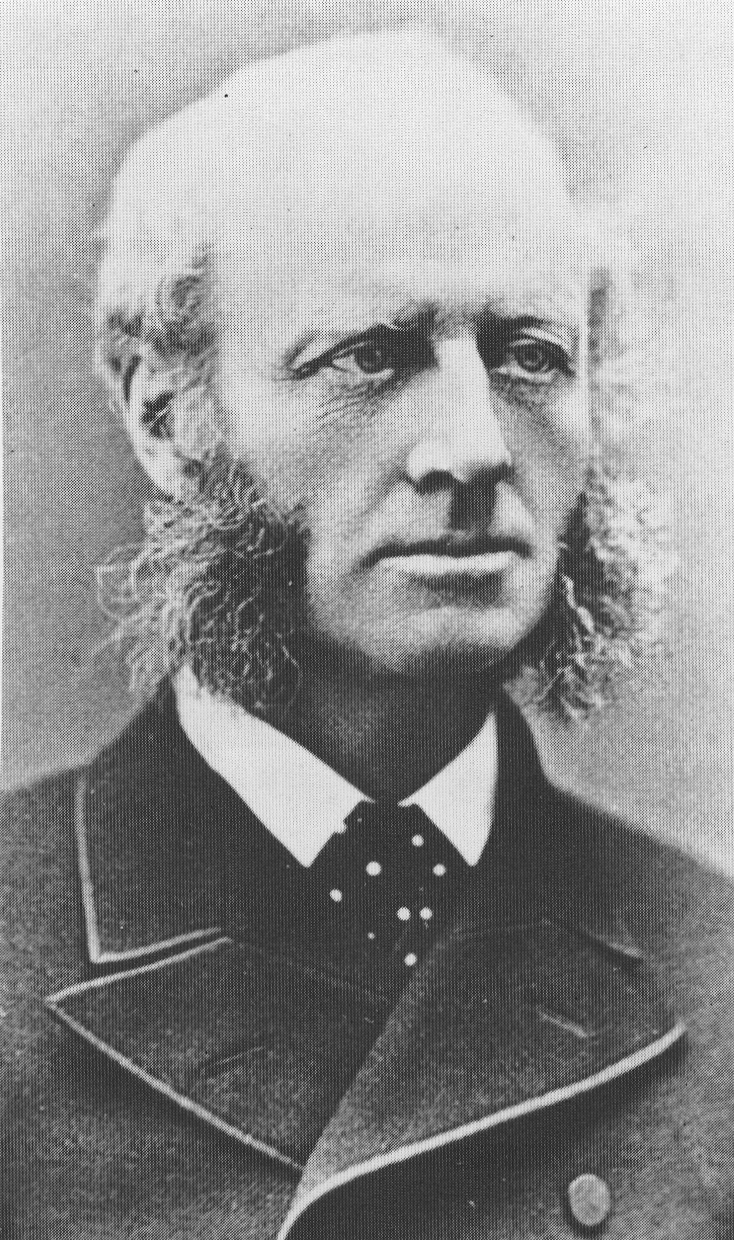
Harry Parkes the British envoy who brought the Bowring Treaty to exchange ratifications and to clarify some issues with Siam during March–May 1856. His presence in Bangkok caused Harris' negotiation to delay for one month.

In his hurry to meet the ratification deadline of the Bowring Treaty, Harry Parkes left Singapore on HMS Auckland to arrive at the Chaophraya river bar on 12 March 1856. The two Siamese kings; Mongkut and Pinklao, were delighted upon knowing that Parkes had brought a royal letter from Queen Victoria with him. In traditional Siamese ideology, a royal letter was the foremost sacred object of diplomacy, its honor surpassing the envoy himself and all the previous British envoys had never brought any letters from British monarchs with them. The Siamese royal court took an urgent preparation to ceremoniously receive the British royal letter, causing Parkes to wait at the river bar for ten days. After Harris having waited for two full months, Armstrong on the San Jacinto arrived in Penang on March 22, 1856. Next day, on March 23, Harry Parkes was admitted to Bangkok, where Parkes had a grand audience with King Mongkut at the Dusit Maha Prasat Throne Hall in the royal palace. Parkes delivered Queen Victoria's letter to the hand of King Mongkut and presented a plethora of gifts, which were so abundant that the Siamese could not record all of them.

Townsend Harris the American envoy and Commodore James Armstrong on the San Jacinto departed from Penang to arrive in Singapore on April 4, 1856. Upon arriving in Singapore, Harris heard an alarming news about imminent arrival of the French envoy Charles de Montigny, who, like Harris, would go to Bangkok to negotiate a Siamese Treaty. Arrival of a competing envoy of another Western nation would be detrimental to Harris' mission or even cause delay. Harris attempted to see Frédéric Gauthier the French Consul in Singapore for information but Gauthier was absent. Moreover, Harris saw the two French large corvettes Constantine and Nisus anchoring at Singapore in preparation for the French mission to Siam and heard that two more French warships would also arrive, bringing the total number of French warships to four, in comparison to one single warship of Harris' retinue. Harris feared that concurrent presence of the French mission in Siam would complicate or delay his own mission so Harris decided to initiate and finish his Siamese mission as soon as possible.

Ratification of the Bowring Treaty, which had been approved by the British government and brought to Siam by Harry Parkes, was exchanged on April 5 in a ceremony. Parkes then proposed to the Siamese government some amendments and clarifications of Bowring Treaty terms. King Mongkut appointed five Siamese commissioners to negotiate with Parkes for the Supplementary Agreement. Earlier, Mongkut saw the Anglo–Japanese Agreement of 1854, in which the British would abide to local Japanese laws and contained no commercial concessions apart from opening of ports, modeled after the Kanagawa Convention. Mongkut then became dissatisfied towards Kalahom Chuang Bunnag, the chief promoter of the Bowring Treaty, for the contrast between extensive Siamese concessions and the Japanese restrictions. Chuang Bunnag was thus sidelined and Mongkut engaged in direct contact with Harry Parkes during the negotiations rather than letting Chuang negotiate on his behalf.

=== Siamese reception of Townsend Harris ===
Townsend Harris and Commodore James Armstrong on USS San Jacinto left Singapore on April 8, 1856, and arrived at the Chaophraya river bar on April 13 along with their American diplomatic retinue, where they found the British warship Auckland anchoring. Harris was upset to see that the British envoy Harry Parkes had not finished business in Siam and knew immediately that his own American mission to Siam would be delayed. The Siamese king Mongkut assigned Chaophraya Si Suriyawong Chuang Bunnag to bring the Siam-owned steamer The Siamese Steam down from Bangkok to fetch the American envoys. Chuang Bunnag, whom Harris called Phra Kalahom the Prime Minister, met Harris on the San Jacinto at the river bar and told Harris that, because the British factory was currently occupied by Harry Parkes, the American delegates were to stay in a bamboo house. Chuang also told Harris that he would be undervalued because he was not a royal envoy from a monarch, upsetting Harris to a great extent. Harris gave account that the Kalahom Chuang Bunnag "is the father of the Siamese navy, as he built all the ships they have which are after European models". Harris then wrote to the First and Second Kings of Siam.

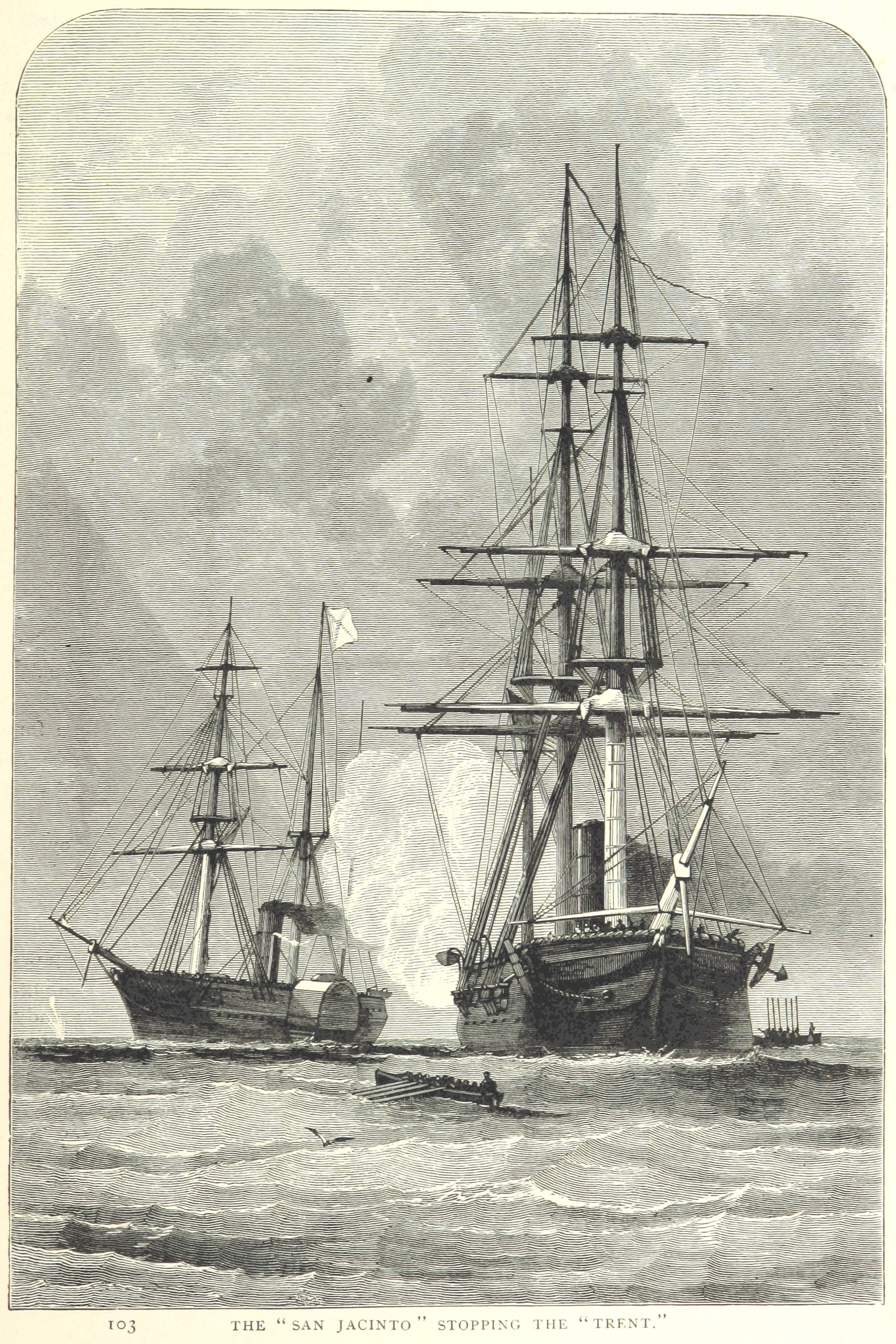
American screw frigate USS San Jacinto (right, during the Trent affair) accompanied Townsend Harris in diplomatic mission to Siam in 1856.

American Presbyterian missionary Stephen Mattoon joined Harris at the river bar as his interpreter. Harry Parkes the British envoy also visited Harris, saying that his own negotiation with the Siamese had been delayed and the distance of four miles from Bangkok stipulated in the Bowring Treaty had been demarcated. Parkes told Harris to expect delays. After waiting on the San Jacinto at the river bar for eight days, The Siamese Steam came to receive Harris, Armstrong and the American diplomatic retinue on April 21, 1856, to the Paknam fort of Samut Prakarn, where the Siamese fired 21-gun salute and played Hail, Columbia for Harris. The Siamese steamer took the Americans upstream to Bangkok, reaching the bamboo house, which was near the Portuguese Consulate on the Phadung Krung Kasem Canal, on the same day, where Harris was received by Dan Beach Bradley and Phrakhlang Kham Bunnag the Siamese Foreign Minister.

Harris had his first meeting with Phrakhlang at the bamboo house. Harris told Phrakhlang that the President of the United States had a great esteem for the King of Siam and was willing to strengthen the American–Siamese friendship. Phrakhlang asked for a copy of the Convention of Kanagawa, to which Harris refused, saying that he would later send it from China. Next day, on April 22, Phrakhlang told Harris that King Mongkut decided not to personally receive the presidential letter from Harris but rather through one of his ministers, not in the same manner as Sir John Bowring's embassy, to which Harris objected and requested to be received in the same honor as Bowring. Harris met the Baptist missionaries Chandler, Telford, Ashmore and also the AMA missionary Bradley, whom Harris mislabeled as "Presbyterian missionary". Harris then visited "Prince George Washington", eldest son of the Second King Pinklao, accompanied by Samuel J. Smith as interpreter. Mattoon informed Harris that he would not be admitted into a private audience with the Siamese king before public one (unlike Bowring in April 1855 and later Montigny in July 1856).

Townsend Harris the American envoy was apparently treated with lower honor than the British envoy (Sir John Bowring) and later the French envoy (Charles de Montigny), stemming from the fact that Harris was not a delegate of a monarch. Harris also learned that some Westerners of certain nation had told the Siamese that the President of the United States ranked not higher than British Admiral, Governor or Envoy. To salvage his situation, Harris visited Phrakhlang Kham Bunnag on April 23, explaining that the Americans considered their president as "the most exalted on earth", being highest rank in the country equivalent to Emperor of King. Phrakhlang, in turn, asked for the United States to be the arbitrator in the disputes between Siam and other Western nations, to which Harris replied that the United States had always been willing to do such thing, which was not necessary to be included in the treaty. Only then the Siamese decided to receive Townsend Harris with full honors on par with Sir John Bowring and the presidential letter would be directly handed to Mongkut by Harris.

Townsend Harris visited Chaophraya Si Suriyawong Chuang Bunnag, whom he called Prime Minister. Harris proposed to Chuang that the American Treaty with Siam would be essentially the same as the Bowring Treaty with some amendments. Chuang replied that Siam could only concede as much as Siam had already conceded to Britain, nothing more. Chuang told Harris that the treaty would be concluded without difficulties but he was not sure whether the Siamese themselves would understand and honor the treaty. Harris then asked whether there were any changes of dynasty in Siam, to which Chuang replied with republican sentiment, saying that "there was often a change at the fourth generation of princes of the same dynasty". Harris also visited Somdet Ong Noi That Bunnag, who had earlier received Joseph Balestier in 1850 and had opposed the Bowring Treaty, whom Harris found to be unexpectedly friendly. Somdet Ong Noi suggested that Harris make Mattoon the U.S. Consul to Siam because Mattoon had never lied and had never got angry.

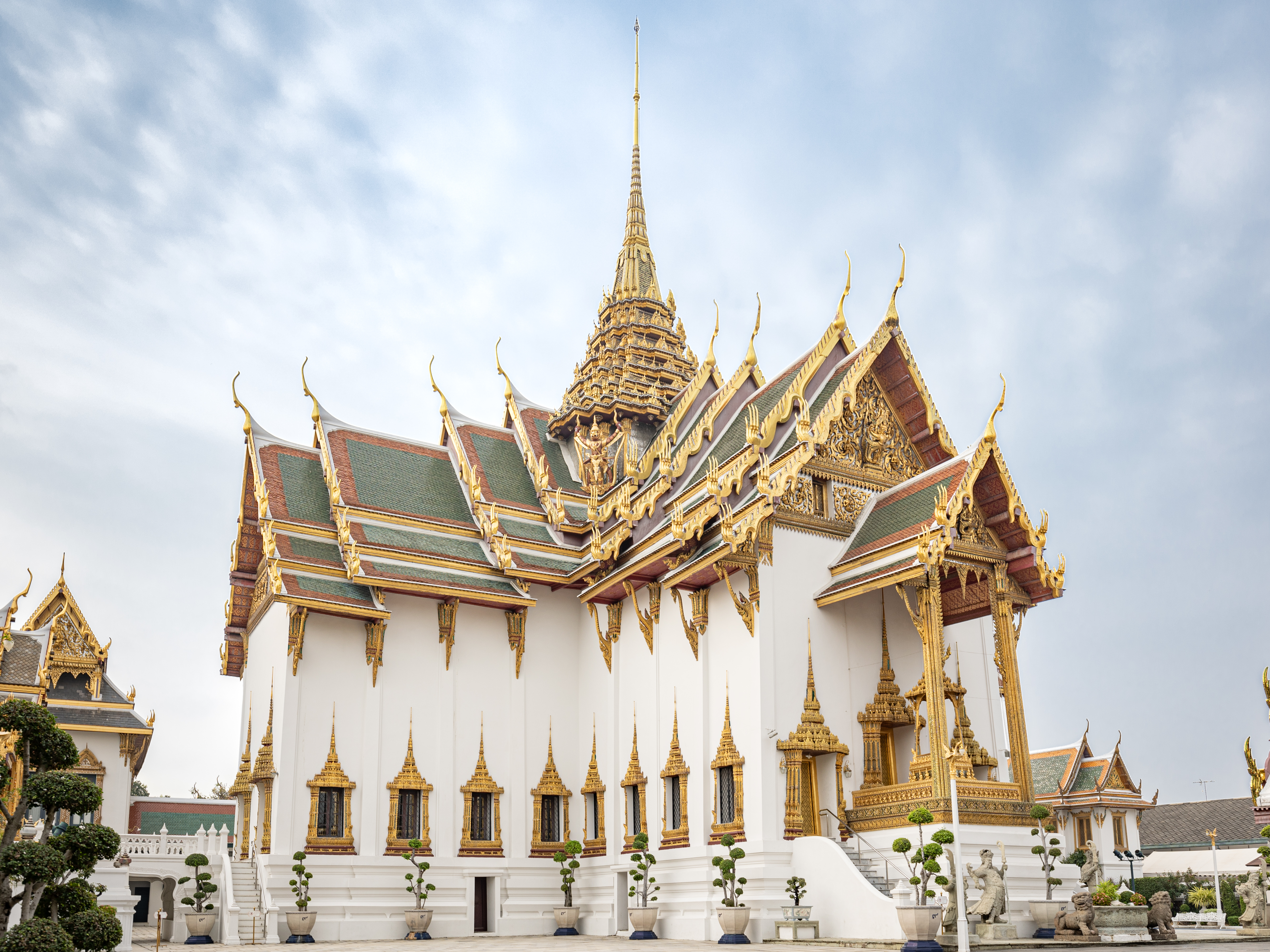
Townsend Harris the American envoy had a grand audience with King Mongkut at Dusit Maha Prasat Throne Hall in the royal palace on May 1st, 1856.

Townsend Harris had a grand audience with King Mongkut on May 1, 1856. Siamese riparian ceremonial barges came to fetch the American envoys from the bamboo house. The presidential letter was placed on a throne with canopy on the main barge, followed by the barge of Townsend Harris accompanied by Mattoon with a coxswain carrying the United States flag and the barge of James Armstrong. The whole riparian barge procession extended along the Chaophraya river for about a mile. When the riparian procession reached the Siamese royal palace, 21-gun salute was fired for the presidential letter.

Townsend Harris and James Armstrong rode on sedan chairs carried on the shoulders of Siamese bearers to the Dusit Maha Prasat Throne Hall, where the grand audience took place. The Americans were admitted into the Throne Hall, inside of which the Siamese princes, dignitaries and officials prostrated on the floor. The curtains opened, revealing King Mongkut sitting on the royal throne under tiered royal umbrella. Harris and Armstrong bowed to the Siamese king as Harris delivered the presidential letter to the hand of Mongkut and then read his own letter addressing the king. Mongkut then had a conversation with Harris, asking whether the United States had concluded treaties with other Asians nations and how long an American President would be in office. Even though Mongkut spoke English, Mattoon still served as interpreter.

Gifts from President Franklin Pierce to King Mongkut included life-sized portraits of Presidents George Washington and Franklin Pierce, two large mirrors, a Sharps rifle, a Colt pistol, two chandeliers, microscopes, books about the United States, Webster's American Dictionary, a large map of the United States and a collection of framed views of American cities including Washington D.C., New York, New Orleans, Boston, Philadelphia, etc. After the grand audience with King Mongkut, next day, on May 2, Townsend Harris and the American diplomatic retinue had an audience with the Second King Pinklao at the Front Palace, undergoing similar ceremonies. Harris noticed that the Front Palace troops were "the best drilled troops I ever saw", being more disciplined than Mongkut's troops. In his address to Pinklao, Harris stated that the United States had no territorial ambitions in the Far East;

The President is aware of the kind manner in which Your Majesty has received the Americans who have visited Siam for many years past. The United States does not hold any possessions in the East, nor does it desire any. The form of its government forbids the holding of colonies. The United States therefore cannot be an object of jealousy to any Eastern power.

The Americanophile Second King Pinklao stated that he knew the names of all the American presidents. Gifts from President Pierce to Pinklao were similar to those presented to Mongkut, plus a comprehensive electrical experimental apparatus.

=== Negotiations between Harris and Siamese commissioners ===
Even though Townsend Harris the American plenipotentiary had undergone the official audience with King Mongkut, he was unable to begin his negotiation with the Siamese, who had not finished their businesses with Harry Parkes the British envoy. Parkes–Siamese negotiations dragged on into early May 1856. On May 5, Harris wrote to Mongkut, asking the Siamese king to appoint commissioners to conclude a treaty with him but to no avail. Harris realized the Siamese would not turn attention to him when Parkes was around, as the Siamese could deal with both Harris and Parkes in the same time. As his provisions were running out on the British warship Auckland, Parkes urged the Siamese to comply to his proposals. The Anglo–Siamese Agreement supplementary to the Bowring Treaty was signed on 13 May 1856, in which the British Consul would exert exclusive jurisdiction over British subjects in Siam without any interferences of the Siamese government. Harris' negotiation was set to be immediately on May 14 but King Mongkut postponed the negotiation, prompting Harris to call Mongkut "pedantic", comparing Mongkut to King James I of England. Harry Parkes left Siam on May 15.

Eventually, on May 16, 1856, King Mongkut appointed five Siamese commissioners to negotiate a treaty with Townsend Harris, these five were the same commissioners that had dealt with Harry Parkes;

- Prince Wongsa Dhiraj Snid, younger half-brother of King Mongkut, the Royal Physician who had been a corresponding member of the New York Academy of Medicine, representing the Siamese royal family.
- Somdet Chaophraya Ong Noi That Bunnag, uncle of Chuang Bunnag, who had received Balestier in 1850 and had opposed the Bowring Treaty
- Chaophraya Si Suriyawong, personal name Chuang Bunnag, the Samuha Kalahom or Prime Minister of Southern Siam, whom Harris called the Prime Minister or Phra Kalahom
- Chaophraya Rawiwong Kham Bunnag, younger half-brother of Chuang, the Phrakhlang or Siamese Minister of Trade and Foreign Affairs
- Chaophraya Yommarat, personal name Nuch, the head of the Nakhonban police. He was not from the Bunnag family.

After waiting for one and a half month since his arrival in Siam, negotiation between Townsend Harris and the Siamese plenipotentiaries commenced on the evening of May 16 at Thonburi Palace, which was the residence of Prince Wongsa. Harris presented his treaty draft, which was essentially the same as the Bowring Treaty. The first article stated that American citizens in Siam would be protected by the Siamese government. As there would be virtually no Siamese going to the United States due to great distance, the United States, therefore, was unable to provide reciprocal protection to Siamese subjects in the treaty. Harris then presented his additional points including;

1. Instead of being restricted to Bangkok, the United States would be allowed to appoint Consuls to anywhere throughout the Kingdom of Siam.
2. The Americans would be allowed to visit the coasts of the Gulf of Siam and its islands with an annual pass rather than one permit for each occasion.
3. American businessmen would pursue mining industry in Siam, in which Chinese and Siamese laborers would be employed and ten percent of revenue would be given to the Siamese government.

The Siamese plenipotentiaries rejected all Harris' additional proposals, citing that if Siam conceded anything to the United States, Siam would also be compelled to grant the same concessions to other Western powers, namely Britain and France, per principle of the Most Favored Nation. The Siamese proposed that the United States should be the arbitrator for any conflicts Siam was going to have with other Western powers. Also, in the same manner as the Bowring Treaty, this American–Siamese Treaty would come into effect only at eighteen months from signing date, to which Harris objected, insisting that the treaty should take effect immediately upon signature. Harris also invoked Article X of the 1833 Roberts Treaty, which stated that if Siam allowed any other Western nations than Portugal to have a Consulate in Siam, in this case, Britain, the United States would be automatically allowed to appoint Consul to Siam. Harris asserted that he had already had power to appoint an American Consul to Bangkok right then.

Next day, on May 17, Townsend Harris fell ill and sent Mattoon to tell Prince Wongsa that Harris willingly withdrew all his amendments to the Bowring Treaty as the model to his treaty, except for the Consul issue. Harris visited Prince Wongsa at the Thonburi Palace on May 19, where Prince Wongsa told Harris that the Americans were mistaken that the Article IV of the Roberts Treaty granted them the Most Favored Nation status because the article only stated about reduction of duties. Prince Wongsa told Harris that King Mongkut wanted a paragraph narrating Siam's own diplomatic history of the last thirty years inserted into the treaty preamble, which Harris considered "a most absurd farrago of nonsense", saying that this was totally unnecessary and it would be a dishonor for the United States to have names of other countries in its commercial treaty with Siam.

On May 21, 1856, a conference between Harris and the commissioners was held again at Thonburi Palace with Mattoon as interpreter. The Siamese commissioners discussed among themselves, not giving Harris much attention. Chuang Bunnag the Kalahom said to Harris that the Siamese loved the United States because it had never sought to conquer any lands in the East, unlike Britain. American missionaries had also contributed to Siam. Chuang then asked Harris; if the United States had been such a friendly nation, why did it ask for the same concessions as the British? Harris realized that the Siamese were forcing him to accept less concessions than the Bowring Treaty. Harris replied that friendship would be a sorry thing if Siam gave a friend less than Siam had given to a foe. Next day, on May 22, the Siamese commissioners pressured Harris to accept less concessions than the British. Harris persisted and delivered an ultimatum that he would only accept concessions to the same degree as Bowring Treaty. Townsend Harris also added that American warships and American Consuls anywhere in the world would provide assistance to travelling Siamese, if only such assistance did not breach neutrality.

On May 24, 1856, Townsend Harris visited Prince Wongsa at Thonburi Palace again. Prince Wongsa suggested to Harris that King Mongkut wanted the word "Sovereign and Magnificent King" be written in the treaty in the same manner as the 1833 Roberts Treaty, to which Harris refused, saying it was a bad English. In fact, Harris did not want to glorify the King of Siam in the treaty. Prince Wongsa then told Harris that the treaty would be the same as the last one that Harris had proposed, indirectly informing Harris that Siam eventually gave the United States the same concessions as the British. Harris was relieved that his mission to conclude a treaty with Siam had been accomplished and ranted in his journal about the nature of Siamese kingdom and people with strong words and derogatory tone, ending in this paragraph;

I never met a people like them, and hope I may never again be sent here. The proper way to negotiate with the Siamese is to send two or three men-of-war of not more than sixteen feet draft of water. Let them arrive in October and at once proceed up to Bangkok and fire their salutes. In such a case the Treaty would not require more days than I have consumed weeks.

=== Conclusion of American–Siamese Harris Treaty ===
Townsend Harris assigned his Dutch secretary Henry Heusken to write the treaty paper. The treaty was made in three copies, each copy contained both English and Thai language versions. Harris informed Phrakhlang Kham Bunnag that he intended to leave Bangkok on May 31. Prince Wongsa told Harris that King Mongkut wished for Harris to stay until June 2 in order for the king to complete his letter to the President of the United States. Harris refused, insisting on leaving on May 31, saying that his food was running out and he was in hurry to continue his diplomatic mission to Japan.

The Treaty of Amity and Commerce, with General Regulations and Tariff of Export and Inland Duties was signed on May 29, 1856 at the Thonburi Palace, residence of the Prince Wongsa, where the treaty had been negotiated. Siamese administrative seals were imprinted on the treaty paper. The Siamese at Wichaiprasit Fort fired 21-gun salute to celebrate the occasion, "All was smiles and good humour". Among the three copies of the treaty, one was given to Prince Wongsa and two were given to Harris. On the same day, Harris announced that he would appoint the Presbyterian American missionary Stephen Mattoon as the U.S. Consul to Siam, the decision that received applause from the Siamese elites, who seemed to favor Mattoon.

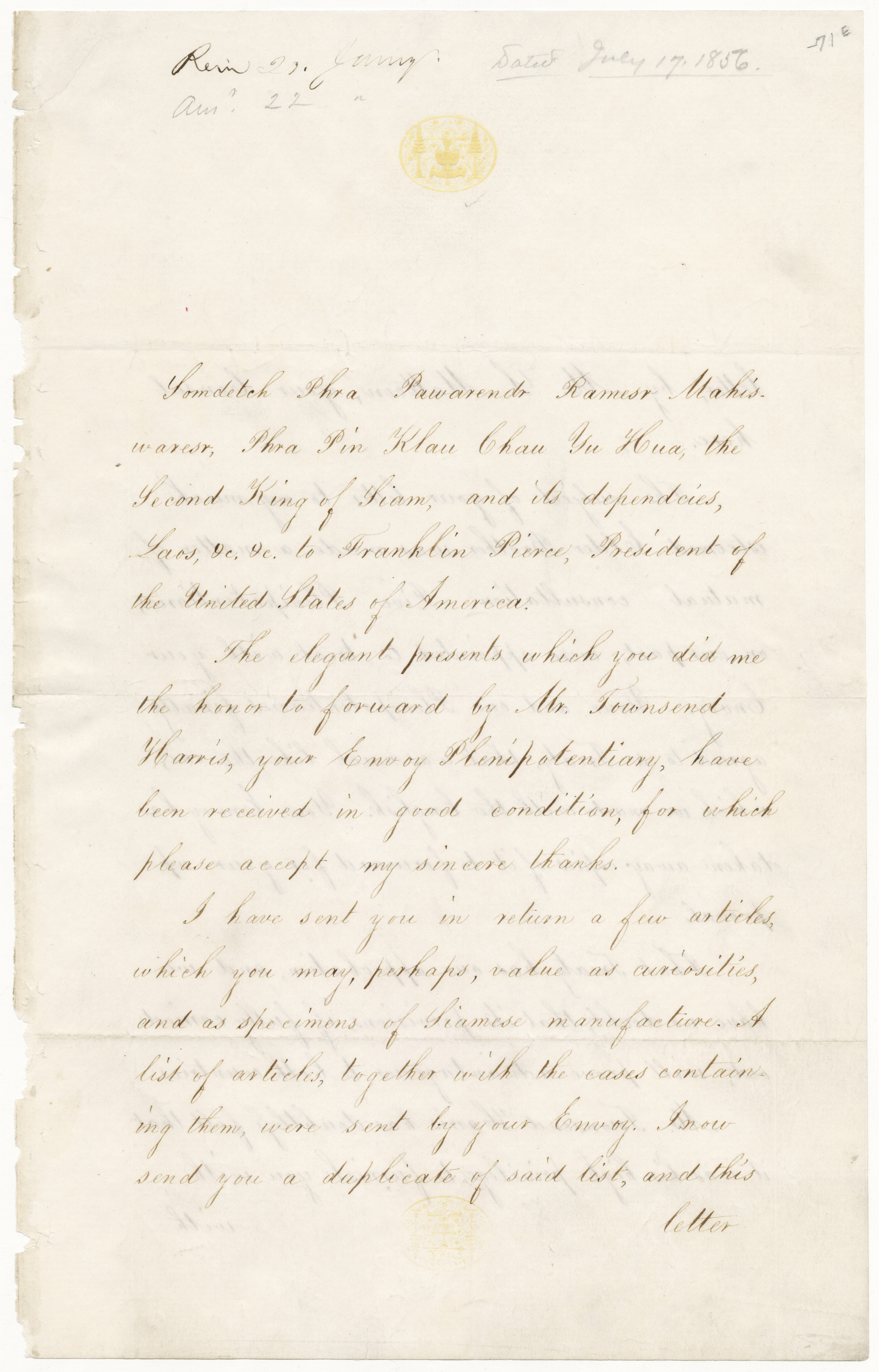
Letter of Second King Pinklao of Siam to President Franklin Pierce, dated to July 17, 1856

On May 30, Townsend Harris had a private audience with King Mongkut at Pong Patchamit Fort, where Harris bowed to King Mongkut and Mongkut bowed to Harris in return. On the same day, Harris visited the Second King Pinklao at the British Factory that used to belong to the late Robert Hunter, the house that also received Sir John Bowring. Pinklao told Harris that, back then when he was still Prince Itsaret, he visited the American envoy Edmund Roberts on his flagship USS Peacock, which anchored at this British Factory in 1833 and remembered the name of all American officers on the Peacock. Pinklao then entrusted Harris with gifts intending for the President including many pieces of silk and cloth, gold nielloware betel set, a brass drum, a brass gong and two brass Phan stands.

Next day, on May 31, Harris' departure date, Harris had a farewell audience with the Siamese king Mongkut at Amarin Winitchai Throne Hall or Hall of Justice. Mongkut told Harris that he could not finish his letter to the President in time. Harris replied that Mongkut could entrust his letter to Stephen Mattoon the newly appointed U.S. Consul to Siam. Mongkut ordered Chaophraya Yommarat (Pia Yumarat) to proclaim appointment of Mattoon as the U.S. Consul. Then Mongkut shifted to a private audience with Harris at another nearby place, where Mongkut shook Harris' hand and said "Good-bye", asked when would be the upcoming American presidential election and gave Harris a letter informing the President about the process of the negotiations. Phrakhlang Kham Bunnag the Siamese Foreign Minister wrote a letter to U.S. Secretary of State William L. Marcy to give account on Harris' diplomatic procedures in Siam.

Townsend Harris the American envoy and his retinue left Bangkok on the Siamese steamer to Samut Prakarn on the evening of that day, May 31. Next morning, on June 1, 1856, Harris embarked on USS San Jacinto, which had been anchoring at the river bar all through Harris' mission in Siam, flagship of Commodore James Armstrong the commander of U.S. East India Squadron, and left Samut Prakarn on that day, thus ending Harris' mission in Siam. Harris and Armstrong on the San Jacinto reached Hong Kong on June 12, 1856, where Harris and Armstrong met Sir John Bowring the Governor of British Hong Kong. Harris then gave Pinklao's gifts to the President to Armstrong & Lawrence Company at Hong Kong to be transported to New York and further sent to the President.

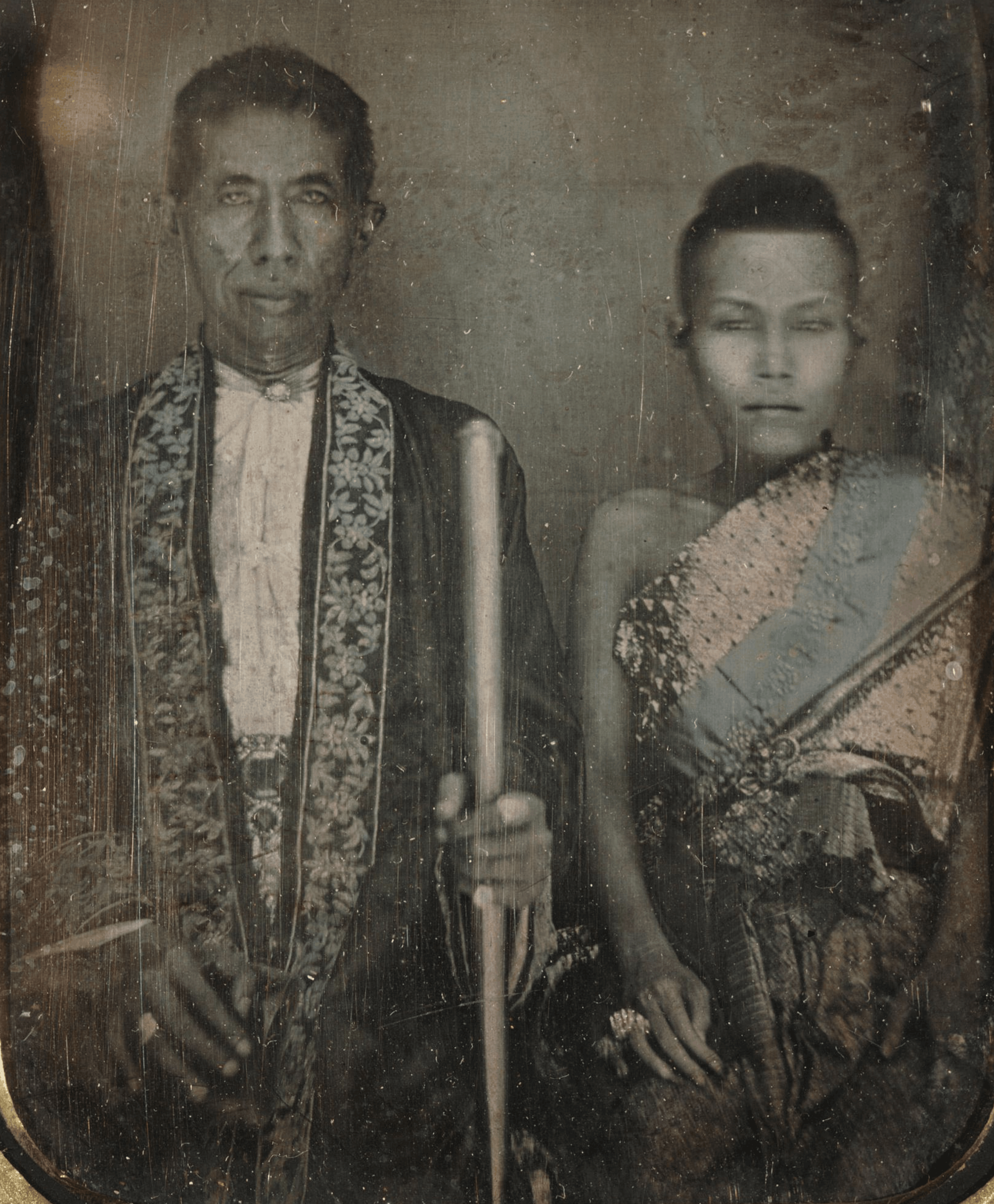
Daguerrotype of King Mongkut and Queen Debsirindra, gifted to President Franklin Pierce in 1856, now kept at the Smithsonian Institution

As Harris was in hurry to leave Siam, Mongkut could not prepare his letter and his gifts to the President in time. Mongkut then later entrusted his letter and his gifts to the U.S. Consul Stephen Mattoon, who forwarded these gifts to the President. As the President of the United States was not a monarch, Mongkut's gifts to the President were in the style of a high-ranking Siamese noble rather than of a king not decorated with jewels and Mongkut's letter to the President was in simple papers, in contrast to the ones Mongkut had sent to the Queen of the United Kingdom and later the French Emperor, who received gilded letters from Mongkut.

Mongkut's letter to President Pierce dated to June 10, 1856. In the letter, Mongkut acknowledged the presidential letter and gifts, informed the President about successful the conclusion of the Harris Treaty and expressed his wishes that American–Siamese relations would flourish. Mongkut's gifts to the President included a Siamese sword, a Malay kris, a pair of gilded spears, a pair of silver spears, a golden nielloware betel set, a golden tonsure scissor, golden cigar pipe and snuffbox set, a cat's eye ring, a golden inkstand, fine clothes and a daguerreotype of King Mongkut and his consort Queen Debsirindra.

In July 1856, Townsend Harris assigned Charles William Bradley the U.S. Consul to Ningpo, who was then in Hong Kong, to bring the Siamese Treaty papers back to the United States government for approval and ratification. On July 16, 1856, the Second King Pinklao wrote to Matthew C. Perry, who was then in New York, telling Perry that Perry had not been forgotten in Siam and that the Colt pistol Perry had sent to him in 1853 was of good use. In the letter, Pinklao also informed Perry that the United States had sent an envoy to successfully conclude a new treaty with Siam. Pinklao sent a Siamese spear to Perry to reciprocate Perry's Colt pistol gift. Next day, on July 17, Pinklao wrote a letter to President Pierce, acknowledging the President's gifts he had received and informing the President that the American–Siamese Treaty had been signed, which would be beneficial to both countries.

== Heads of State and Signatories ==
=== Heads of State ===
==== Siam ====
- Phra Bard Somdetch Phra-Paramendr Maha Mongkut Phra Chom Klau Chau Yu Hua (King Mongkut of Siam), the First King of Siam
- Phra Bard Somdetch Phra-Pawarendr Ramesr Mahiswaresr Phra Pin Klau Chau Yu Hua (Vice-King Pinklao), the Second King of Siam
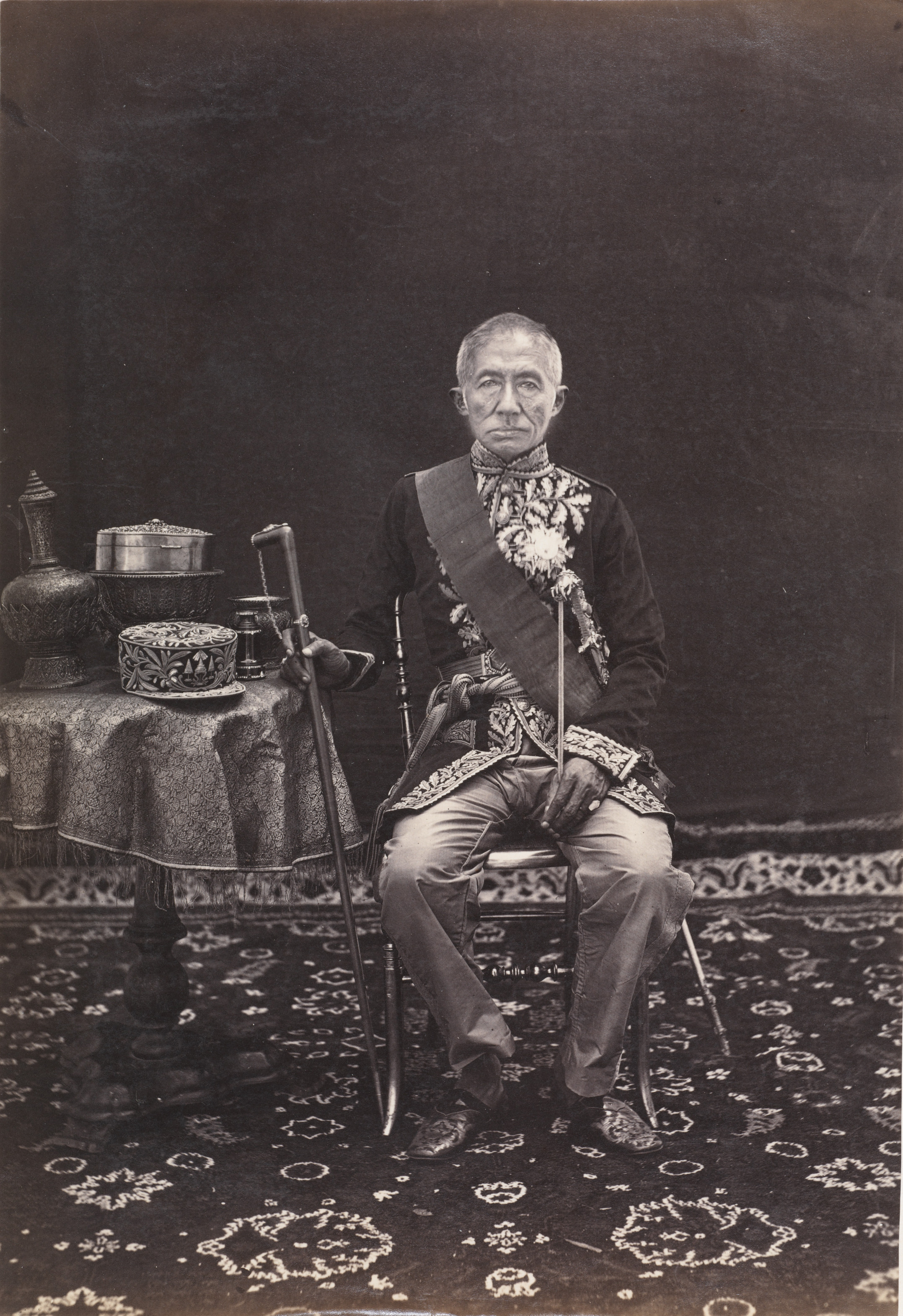
Mongkut, the First King of Siam

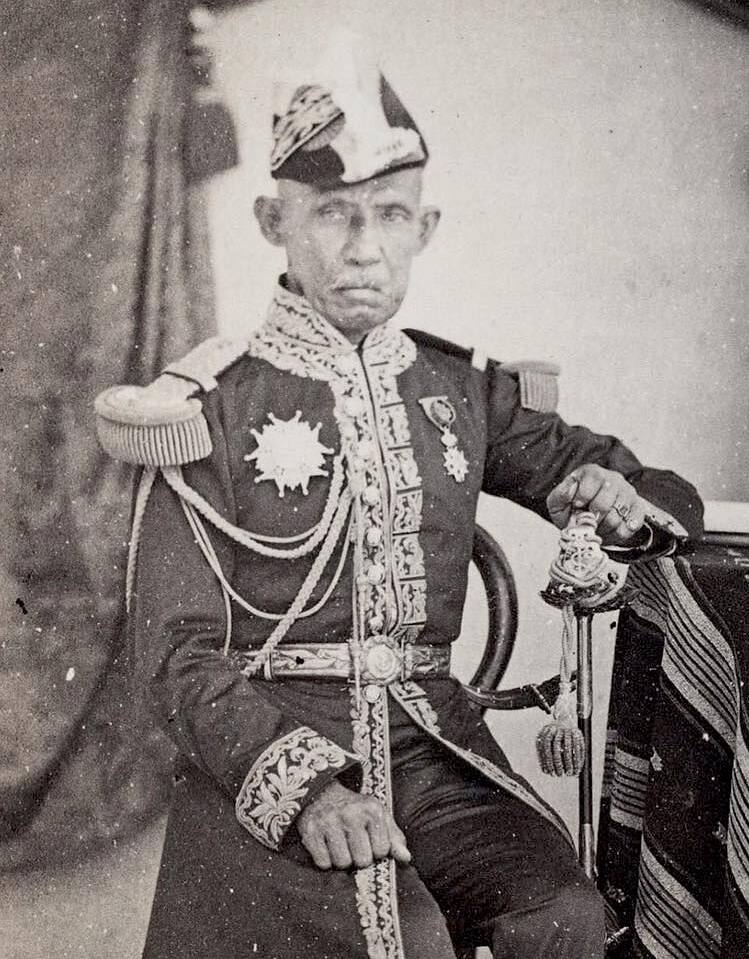
Pinklao, the Second King of Siam

==== United States ====
- The President of the United-States of America (Franklin Pierce)
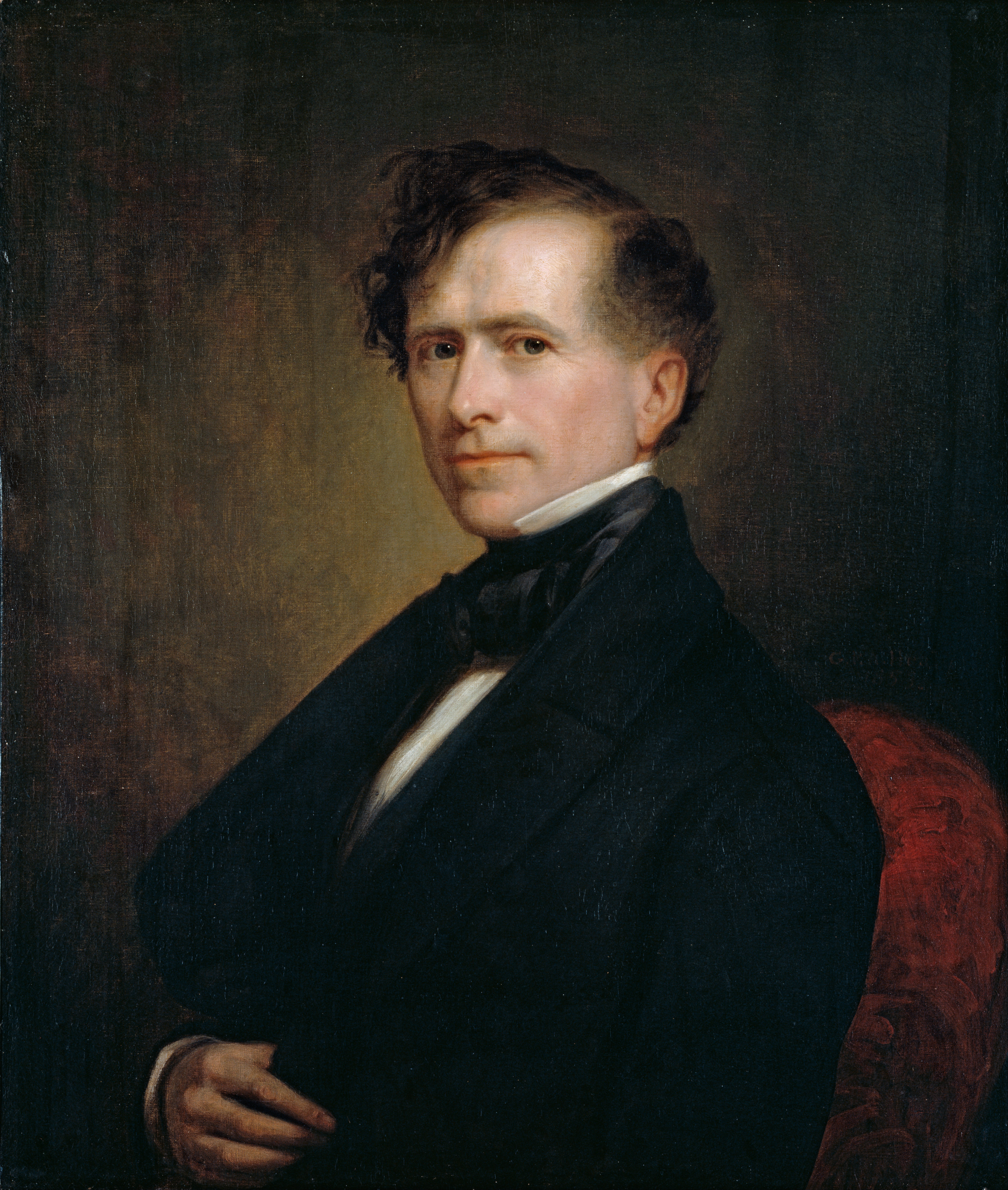
Franklin Pierce, President of the United States

=== Signatories ===
==== Siam ====
- His Royal Highness, the Prince Krom Hluang Wongsa Dhiraj Snidh (Prince Wongsa Dhiraj Snid)
- His Excellency Somdetch Chau Phaya Param Maha Bijai Neate (Somdet Chaophraya Phichaiyat, personal name That Bunnag)
- His Excellency Chau Phaya Sri Suriwongse Samuha Phra Kalahome (Chaophraya Si Suriyawong, personal name Chuang Bunnag, the Samuha Kalahom or Prime Minister of Southern Siam)
- His Excellency Chau Phaya Rawe Wongee Maha Kosa Dhipade (Chaophraya Rawiwong, personal name Kham Bunnag, younger brother of Chuang Bunnag), the Phra Klang
- His Excellency Chau Phaya Yomray (Chaophraya Yommarat, personal name Nuch), the Lord Mayor (Head of the Nakhonban police)
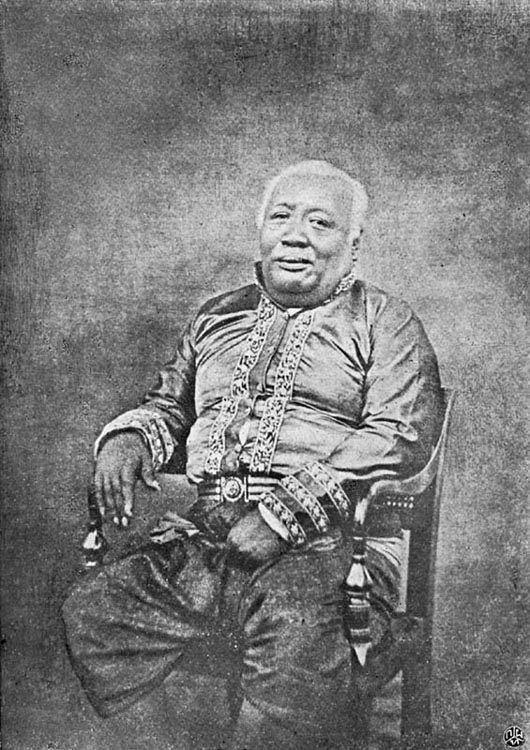
Prince Wongsa Dhiraj Snid, younger half-brother of King Mongkut

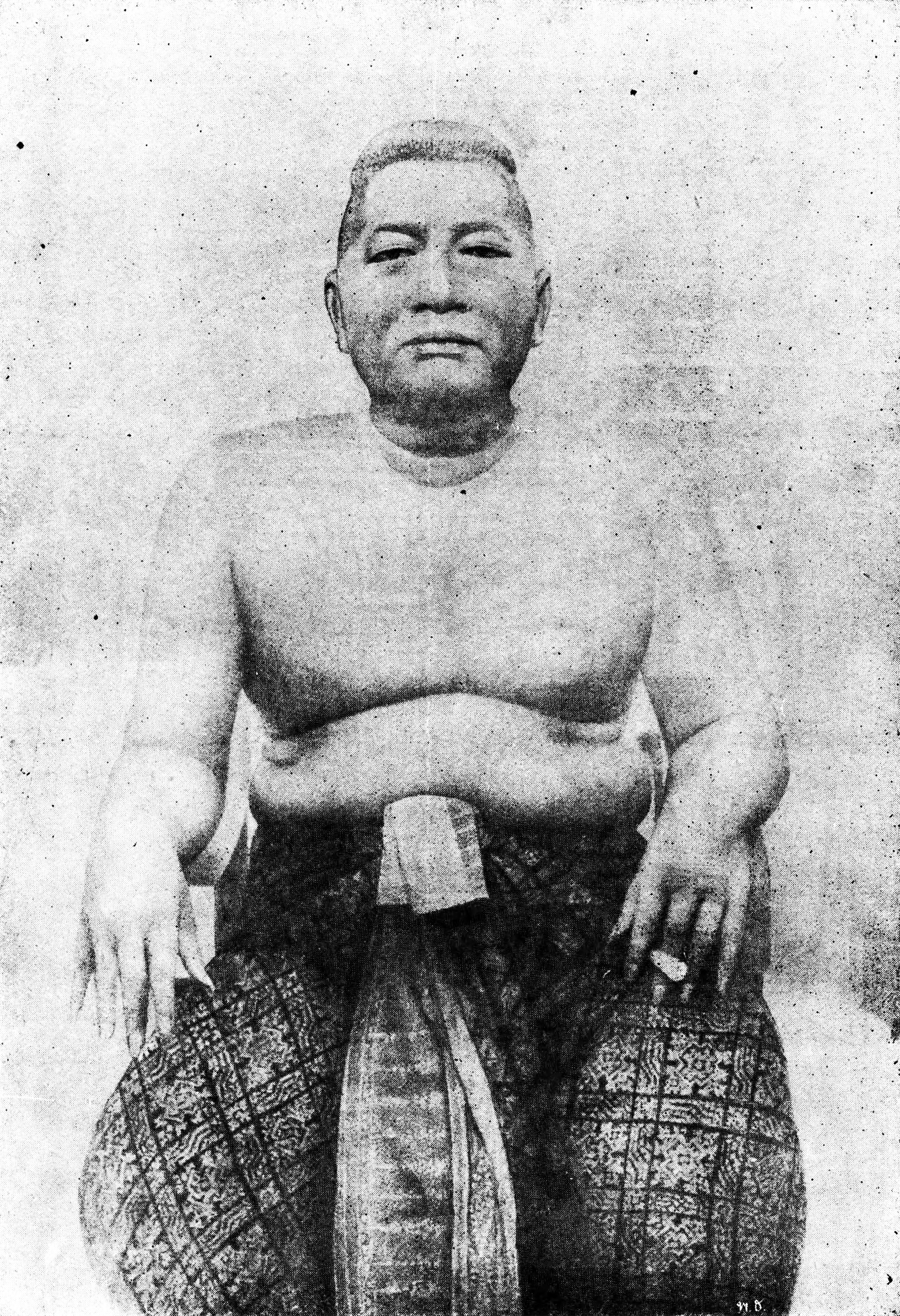
Somdet Chaophraya Phichaiyat (That Bunnag), overseeing Siam's trade duties

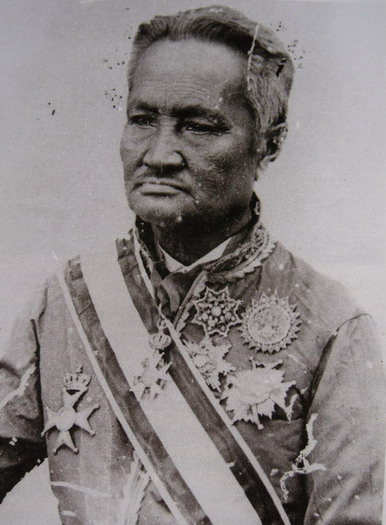
Chaophraya Si Suriyawong (Chuang Bunnag) the Samuha Kalahom or Prime Minister of Southern Siam

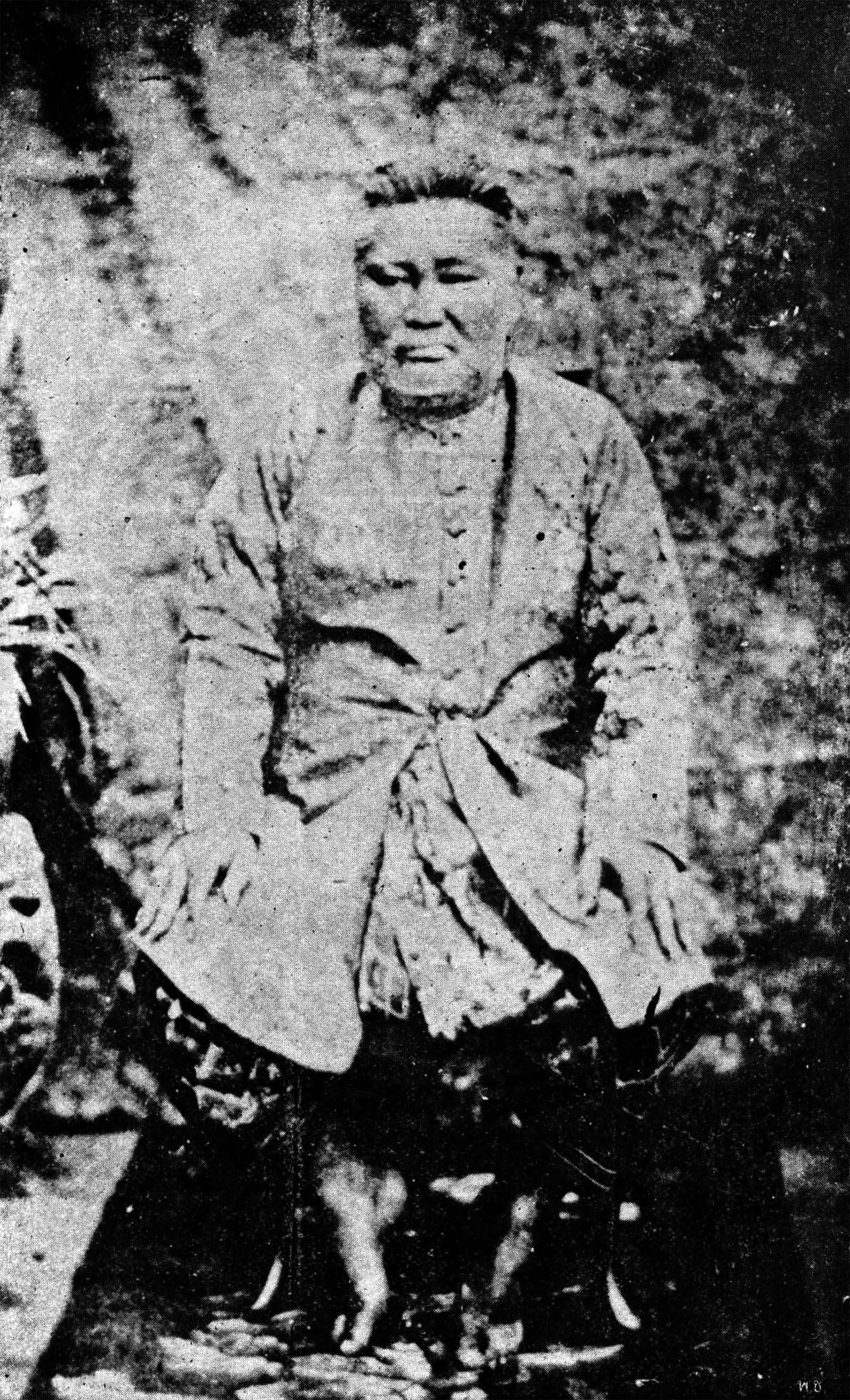
Chaophraya Rawiwong (Kham Bunnag) the Phrakhlang or Minister of Trade and Foreign Affairs.

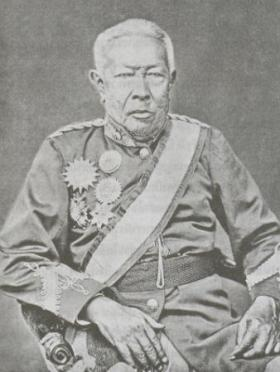
Chaophraya Yommarat (Nuch), head of the Nakhonban police, he later became Chaophraya Phutharaphai

==== United States ====
- Townsend Harris Esquire of New York, Consul-General of the United States of America for the Empire of Japan
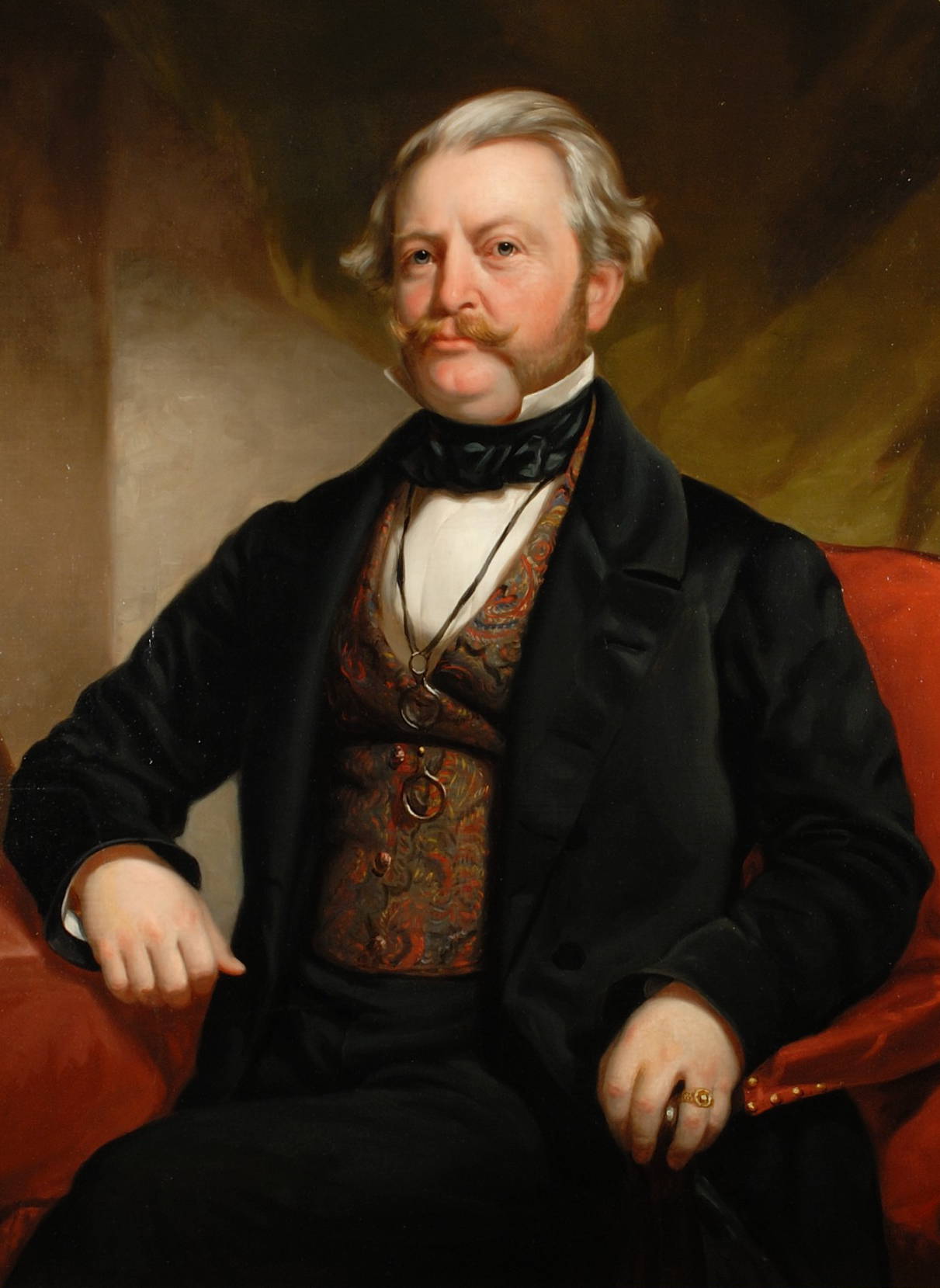
Townsend Harris, Consul-General of the United States to the Empire of Japan

== Ratification of the Treaty ==
=== Settlement of Townsend Harris in Shimoda ===
Stephen Mattoon the Presbyterian missionary was appointed as the first U.S. Consul to Siam in May 1856 by the American plenipotentiary Townsend Harris before Harris' departure from Siam. Mattoon obtained a land in Samre in Thonburi for the American merchant David Olyphant King to establish business. Samuel Reynolds House, another Presbyterian missionary, had earlier left Siam in April 1855 to go to the United States, where he married Harriet Pettit in November 1855. House returned to Bangkok with his wife in July 1856. Also in July, the French envoy Charles de Montigny arrived in Siam to similarly conclude a treaty with Siam, the Franco–Siamese Treaty of August 1856, which guaranteed freedom of proselytization of the French Catholic missionaries, in which the American Protestant missionaries were also accorded such same rights per the principle of the Most Favored Nation. J.H. Chandler resigned from the Baptist mission in 1856 to pursue his printing business in Bangkok full-time, leaving Samuel J. Smith, Robert Telford, William Ashmore and their wives as Baptist missionaries in Bangkok. Samuel J. Smith married Sarah Sleeper Jones, the widow of his adoptive father John Taylor Jones, who had died in 1851.

Screw frigate USS San Jacinto breaking down required extensive repairs at Whampoa in Canton, stranding Townsend Harris, who wandered around Canton, Hong Kong and Macau for two months. Harris and Commodore James Armstrong the commander of U.S. East India Squadron could only depart from Hong Kong on the San Jacinto on August 12, 1856, reaching the Japanese coastal town of Shimoda, where the Americans were entitled to establish a consulate, on August 21. Upon arrival in Shimoda, Harris requested Inoue Kiyonao (井上清直) the Japanese governor of Shimoda for permission to disembark, stay and establish the American consulate in Shimoda per the Kanagawa Convention of 1854. Harris also sent the letter from William L. Marcy the U.S. Secretary of State to the Tokugawa shogunate government at Edo (modern Tokyo).

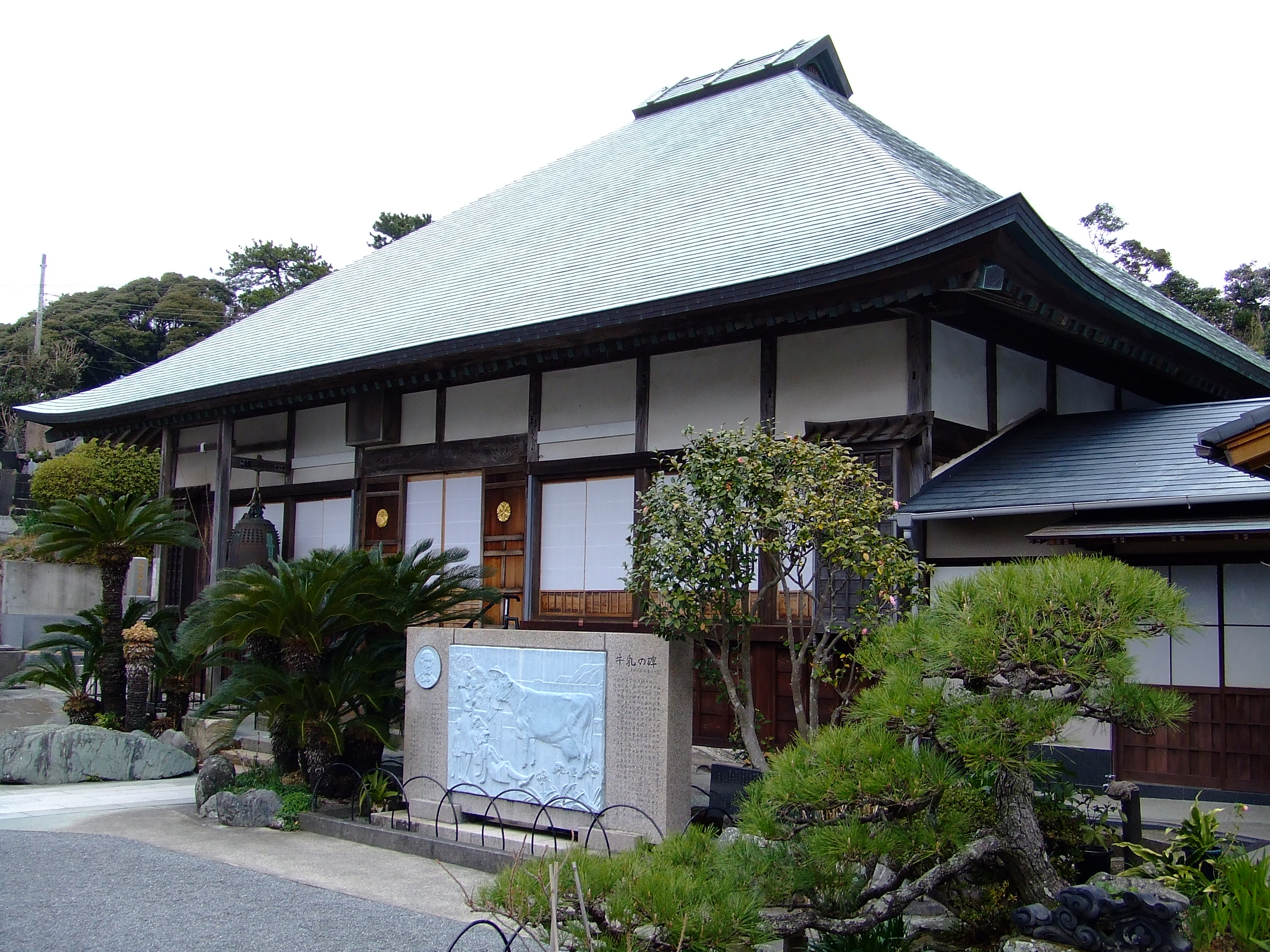
Gyokusen-ji Temple in Shimoda, where Townsend Harris established the first American Consulate in Japan in September 1856

Harris communicated with the Japanese through his Dutch interpreter Henry Heusken and the interpreter on Japanese part Moriyama Einosuke (森山栄之助), who had prominent roles during the previous visit of Matthew C. Perry to Japan during 1853–1854. The Japanese, however, were still reluctant to allow the Americans to have a permanent residence. Harris was allowed to move to settle at the Gyokusen-ji Temple, where the American Consulate was designated to be, on September 3. Next day, on September 4, 1856, Harris hoistered the American flag above the temple – the flag that Harris described as "the First Consular Flag" in Japan. James Armstrong and the San Jacinto left on the same day to return to Shanghai, leaving Harris and Heusken in isolation in Shimoda.

The Japanese authority in Shimoda controlled all of Harris' communications with outside of the temple and also forbid Harris to leave Shimoda. Harris attempted to make a direct contact with the shogunate at Edo but the Shimoda officials told Harris to surrender the presidential letter to them to be delivered to the shogun instead, to which Harris refused. Harris' Siamese Treaty, earlier concluded by Harris at Bangkok in May, was brought by Charles William Bradley the U.S. Consul at Ningpo to the United States for ratification, reaching Washington D.C. in September 1856 and on September 17, 1856, an abbreviated and inaccurate version of this Siamese Treaty, leaked, appeared on The New York Times, of which the word "American subjects" was used instead of "American citizens". Harris, however, had been instructed to conduct all negotiations with Siam in secrecy. President Franklin Pierce considered this leak of the Siamese Treaty to be a serious breach of diplomatic secrecy by Harris and considered relieving Harris of his Japan Consular position. Only through intervention of Harris' friends Prosper M. Wetmore and Marcy himself that prevented Harris from being sacked. Harris speculated that the Siamese themselves had leaked the treaty to the press.

Meanwhile, in Canton, China, the Arrow Incident, during which the Chinese authorities seized the lorcha Arrow hoisting British flag, happened on 8 October 1856, prompting Sir John Bowring the Governor of British Hong Kong and Harry Parkes the British Consul to Canton (Both Bowring and Parkes were formerly British envoys to Siam) to seek redress from Ye Mingchen (葉名琛) the Viceroy of Liangguang, capitalizing the incident as casus belli and exaggerating the conflict into the Second Opium War. Even though the Americans considered the British new war with China rather unjustified, they occupied the same vulnerable position in Canton at risk of being attacked by the Chinese. Oliver H. Perry the American Consul to Canton, son of Matthew C. Perry, requested protection from Commander Andrew Hull Foote of USS Portsmouth at Whampoa. Commander Foote was unable to propel the sloop-of-war Portsmouth deeper into the Pearl River so he led the American marines to march on land to guard the American factories in Canton against possible Chinese attacks. On October 31, Inoue Kiyonao the Shimoda governor came to have dinner with Harris at the temple with Moriyama serving as interpreter – the event that Harris asserted to be "an important day in the history of Japan".

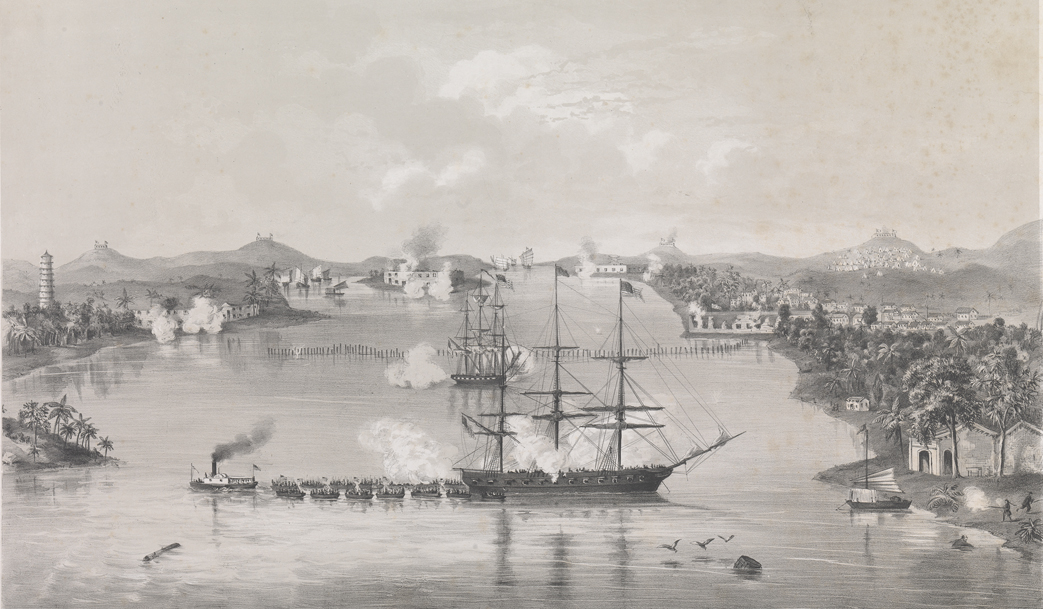
Battle of the Barrier Forts of Guangzhou in November 1856, during which USS Portsmouth and USS Levant bombarded the four Chinese barrier forts on the banks of Pearl River

Upon learning about the new war in Canton, Commodore James Armstrong took USS San Jacinto from Shanghai to Canton in late October to assist Commander Foote. In November 1856, James Buchanan was elected as the new President of the United States. As Armstrong negotiated and obtained from the Qing authority that the Americans would not be harmed, the Americans withdrew from Canton. However, on November 15, the Chinese at the Barrier Forts on the Pearl River fired at Commander Foote while he was withdrawing. Armstrong saw this as the Chinese violation of the agreement and ordered Foote to take the Portsmouth to attack and seize the four Chinese barrier forts on the Pearl River, leading to the Battle of the Barrier Forts in November 1856. By November 22, the Americans had taken control of all the four forts and spent next month demolishing all these four forts.

On the Christmas Day, December 25, Townsend Harris lamented that he had been in a virtual imprisonment in Shimoda and on the New Year's Day he missed New York City. On January 7, 1857, Inoue Kiyonao the Shimoda governor summoned Harris to his office and told Harris that the shogunate had assigned Shimoda officials to give only a verbal reply to Marcy's letter Harris had earlier sent to Edo, enraging Harris, who was upset that the shogunate chose not to give reply but instead relegated the task to local Shimoda officials. Seeing Harris persisting, the five Rōjū of the shogunate, including Hotta Masayoshi and Abe Masahiro, issued a formal reply to Marcy's letter. The reply was placed in a box and delivered to Harris at Shimoda on February 25. The content of the reply was that the shogunate had empowered Shimoda officials with full authorities to negotiate with Harris and Harris should not seek direct contact with the shogunate. Harris responded by proposing to Shimoda officials, including Inoue the Shimoda governor, that the Americans should be allowed to trade at Nagasaki, be allowed to exercise extraterritorial jurisdiction, be allowed to rent lands and erect buildings. Stress and isolation had taken toll on Harris. By March 1857, Townsend Harris had fallen ill, vomiting blood.

=== Bradley Mission to Siam (1857) ===
The president-elect James Buchanan sent Harris' Siamese Treaty to the 34th United States Congress on December 8, 1856, and the president's message was read to the Congress in December 17. In February 1857, the Dutch barque Henriette Maria departed from Macau with hundreds of Chinese laborers intending for Havana but the Chinese mutinied on board and seized control of the ship. Captain George W. Tucker found the ship Henriette Maria to be deprived of command in a piratical state so he took control of the ship and hoisted the American flag to claim salvation. Tucker brought Henriette Maria to Singapore in March 1857. Edmund Augustus Blundell the governor of Straits Settlements, however, considered the Americans having wrongfully taken control of the barque Henriette Maria, which should belong to the Dutch. The British in Singapore then took control of the ship for the Dutch and hauled down the American flag without ceremony, angering Thomas Biddle the U.S. Consul in Singapore. Commodore James Armstrong, being in poor health, sent Commander Foote on USS Portsmouth to claim American rights in the Dutch ship incident at Singapore.

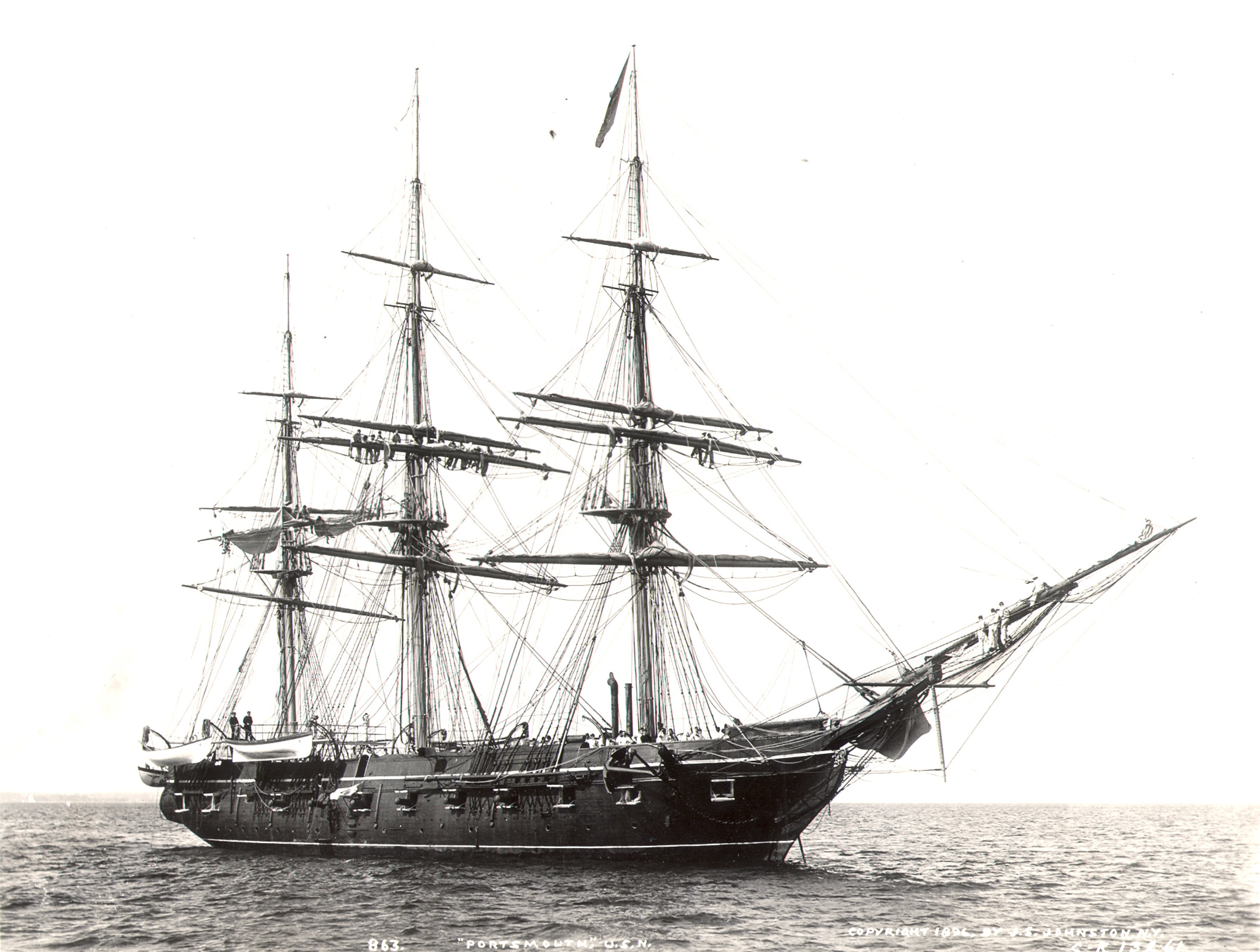
American sloop-of-war USS Portsmouth under Commander Andrew Hull Foote escorted the American envoy Charles W. Bradley to Siam during May–June 1857.

Upon inauguration of James Buchanan on March 4, 1857, the Siamese Treaty was sent into the Congress session. The Congress saw Article V of the treaty, which stipulated that all the Americans who came to reside and travel in Siam should register themselves to the American Consul in order to obtain the identification passport, which such Americans were required to carry and produce upon request of the Siamese police, who were empowered to arrest and detain any Americans who fail to produce such passports; "it will be their duty to detain those Persons, who, by travelling without a pass from the Consul render themselves liable to the suspicion of their being deserters", to be problematic. The Congress could not entertain the idea of allowing the Americans to be detained by any foreign authorities so the Congress rejected Article V of this American–Siamese Treaty, even though the term was identical to Article V of the Bowring Treaty. The Congress voted to turn down the Article V of Harris' Siamese Treaty on March 13, 1857 and agreed to all other points of the treaty. Approved by the Congress with amendment on Article V, the treaty was delivered to President James Buchanan, who ratified the treaty on March 16, 1857.

On March 17, 1857, President Buchanan assigned Charles William Bradley the U.S. Consul to Ningpo, who had earlier brought the Siamese Treaty from Harris to the United States government, to go to Siam to exchange ratifications of the treaty on his journey to Ningpo and to persuade the Siamese to accept Congress' rejection of Article V by giving the reason that the number of the Americans going to Siam would be very small due to great distance and, therefore, very few Americans would violate Siamese restriction of travel. If the Siamese did not accept this amendment, Bradley was to deposit the treaty paper to Oliver H. Perry the American Consul at Canton to wait for further instructions. On his journey passing through London, Charles W. Bradley consulted with George M. Dallas the United States Minister to Britain, who gave opinion that, even though the Congress had stricken down the Article V, Siam could still exert police regulations on the Americans.

James Armstrong had earlier promised to revisit Townsend Harris at Shimoda with his flagship USS San Jacinto after the lapse of six months. However, due to Armstrong's falling health and the ongoing Second Opium War, the San Jacinto did not come, causing Harris in April 1857 to resent Armstrong for failing to honor his promise. Moreover, absence of American warships on the Japanese shore would be detrimental to Harris' position in his negotiation with Japan. Charles William Bradley the American envoy to Siam arrived in Singapore on SS Aden of the Peninsular Oriental Company on May 15, 1857. Commander Andrew Hull Foote of the Portsmouth, who had been in Singapore to settle the Dutch ship affair, eagerly offered himself to escort Bradley in his diplomatic mission to Siam. Charles William Bradley and Commander Foote on the Portsmouth departed from Singapore on May 21 and reached the Chaophraya river bar on May 27, 1857. The Portsmouth was unable to cross the river bar so Bradley and Foote had to wait for the Siamese to fetch them up to Bangkok.

Six days after, the Siamese and Stephen Mattoon the U.S. Consul came down with a steamer at the river bar to receive Bradley and Foote on June 2. The Portsmouth fired 21-gun salute to honor Siam and another 9-gun salute to honor the U.S. Consul Mattoon. Bradley and Foote arrived at the Paknam Fort of Samut Prakarn where an American flag was hoisted and the Siamese fired 21-gun salute to honor the American envoy. Charles W. Bradley the American envoy (do not confuse with the missionary Dan Beach Bradley) wrote a letter informing Chaophraya Rawiwong Kham Bunnag the Phrakhlang or Siamese Foreign Minister that Bradley had come to exchange ratifications of the Harris Treaty and that the Article V of the treaty had been stricken out. Bradley, Foote and the American diplomatic retinued arrived in Bangkok on the same day of June 2 and they were arranged to reside at the mansion of Phrakhlang Kham Bunnag himself in modern Thonburi.

On June 4, 1857, a formal conference was held at the Phrakhlang's mansion between Charles W. Bradley and Prince Wongsa Dhiraj Snid, Phrakhlang Kham Bunnag, the Siamese commissioners who had earlier concluded the treaty with Townsend Harris in May 1856 a year earlier, concerning the Congress' rejection of the Article V, with presence of the U.S. Consul Mattoon. The Siamese commissioners initially rejected Bradley's proposal, saying that if Siam was to cut off Article V, Siam would also have to cut off the same provision in Siam's other treaties with Britain and France, thus the Siamese internal passport system would collapse. The Siamese commissioners took Bradley's proposal to the two kings of Siam; Mongkut and Pinklao. Next day on June 5, Charles W. Bradley, Commander Foote and other American personnel had an audience with the Americanophile Pinklao the Second King of Siam at the Front Palace, where Pinklao showed his large diamonds, worth from US$2,000 to US$6,000 each, to the Americans.

Amendment to American–Siamese Treaty of 1856
Regulation VII of the General Regulations under which American trade is to be conducted in Siam
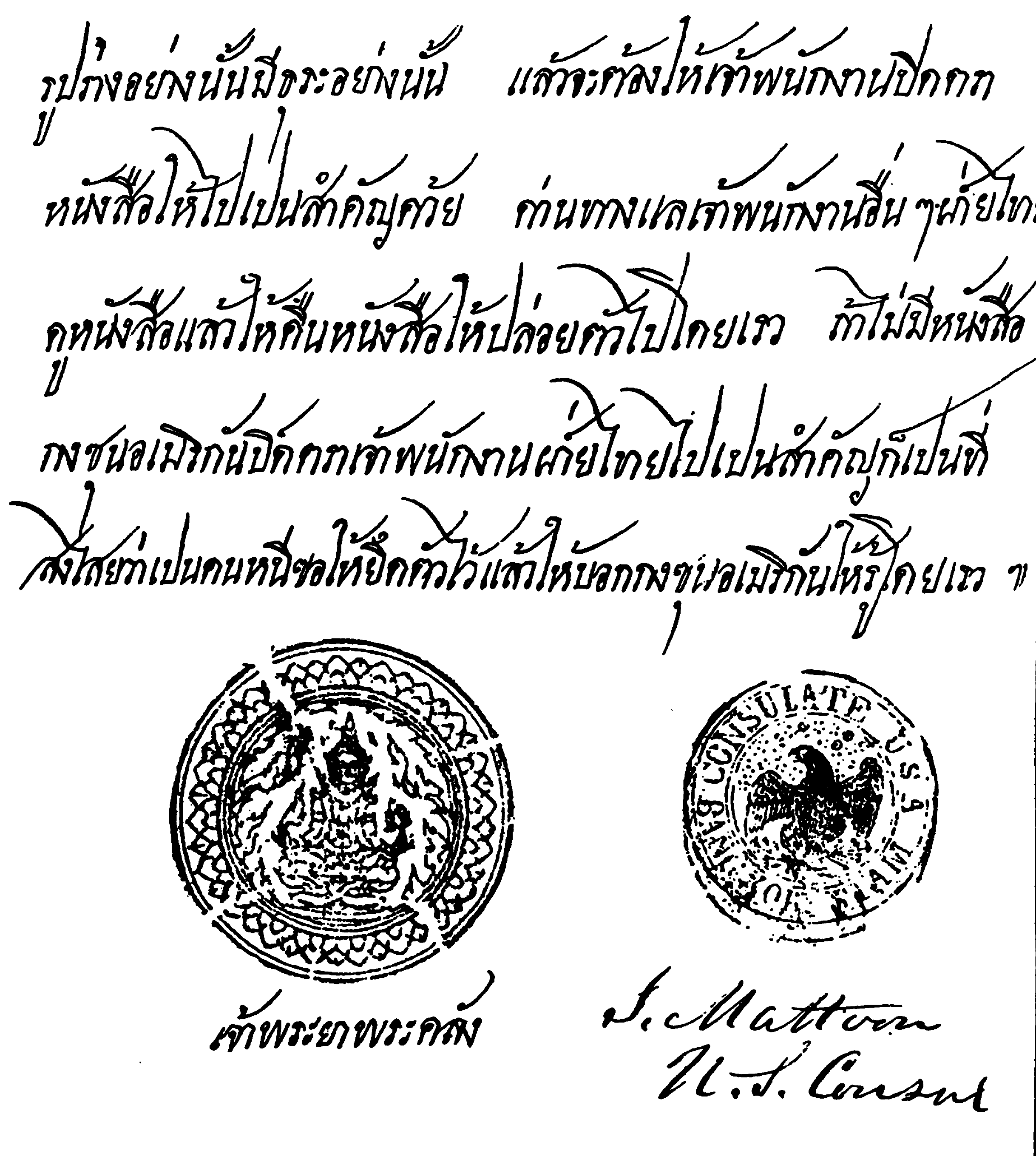
- Bottom excerpt of the June 1857 amendment of the U.S.–Siam Harris Treaty, which reinserted Article V, earlier rejected by the Congress, into the treaty as Regulation VII, with Lotus Seal of Phrakhlang Kham Bunnag (left), the seal and signature of Stephen Mattoon the U.S. Consul to Siam (right).
- Type: Amendment
- Signed: 15 June 1857
- Location: Mansion of Chaophraya Rawiwong; Thonburi, Bangkok
- Signatories: (United States) Stephen Mattoon; (Thailand) Chaophraya Rawiwong (Kham Bunnag)
- Parties: United States; (Thailand) Kingdom of Siam
- Language: English; Thai

On June 6, the Siamese commissioners came to tell Bradley that the two Siamese kings considered the Article V to be essential to the treaty. If the U.S. government did not accept Article V then the Harris Treaty would not be ratified. Bradley then faced a dilemma. Deletion of Article V from the treaty was going to render this Harris Treaty failed but he also could not reinsert the article against Congress' decision. Bradley then proposed a compromise that the Article V should instead be reinserted into the accompanying General Regulations. The Siamese did not agree but Bradley convinced them that, even though the Article V was out, Siam still had rightful power to enforce its own police authority within its own territories. Moreover, Article IX of the treaty had stated that the U.S. Consul could introduce new necessary regulations.

Meanwhile, on June 8, 1857, Townsend Harris the U.S. Consul to Japan concluded with Shimoda officials new treaty terms including opening of Nagasaki to American ships, rights of permanent residence of the Americans in Shimoda and Hakodate and the Americans being exclusively subjected to consular authorities not being under local Japanese laws.

During his stay in Siam, Charles W. Bradley gathered reports that, since Siam's conclusion of treaties with Britain, France and the United States, 270 Western merchant ships had come to trade in Bangkok, in contrast to twelve ships per annum pre-treaties. Fifty-four American ships had come to trade and, when Bradley was staying, seven American ships were trading in Bangkok. American merchants could buy good-quality rice and sugar from Siam at low prices. The rice would be sold in China and sugar at New York. The export value conducted by American merchants from Siam in this time duration was at US$430,514.

On June 12, 1857, Pinklao the Second King of Siam, who had been a shipbuilder in his younger years, along with his eldest son Prince Yotyingyot, who was known to the Americans as "Prince George Washington", came down from Bangkok to visit the American sailing sloop-of-war Portsmouth at the river bar. The Portsmouth fired gun salutes, demonstrated manning of yards and exercise of the crew at general quarters for Pinklao and his son to see. Ratification of the American–Siamese Treaty, earlier concluded by Townsend Harris in May 1856, was exchanged on June 15, 1857, between Charles W. Bradley and the Siamese under due ceremonies at the Siamese royal palace. The Siamese fired 21-gun salute to celebrate the occasion. King Mongkut had written the instrument of ratification in English language himself. Article V of the treaty, rejected by the Congress, was reintroduced as Regulation VII into the treaty. Charles W. Bradley, Commander Foote and their retinue left Bangkok on the same day of June 15, embarking on USS Portsmouth at the river bar to depart from Siam, ending Bradley's diplomatic mission to Siam.

Two days later, on June 17, Townsend Harris signed the new treaty terms with the Japanese into the Convention of Shimoda with Inoue Kiyonao the Shimoda governor and other Shimoda officials. Bradley and Foote on the Portsmouth arrived in Hong Kong on June 26 and Bradley delivered the ratified Siamese Treaty papers to Oliver H. Perry the U.S. Consul at Canton on June 29. Perry then sent the treaty papers to the United States, reaching New York in April 1858.

== Treaty provisions ==
The American–Siamese Treaty, concluded by the American plenipotentiary Townsend Harris with the five Siamese commissioners on May 29, 1856, was nearly identical to the preceding Anglo–Siamese Bowring Treaty of April 1855 word-by-word and article-by-article as both treaties were made in English language, with some differences. It was Harris' mission to obtain the same concessions from Siam as the British, which Harris struggled to get because the Siamese commissioners attempted to force Harris to accept less concessions than the Bowring Treaty but Harris persisted. This American–Siamese Treaty being identical to the Bowring Treaty was, therefore, the best outcome Harris could obtain from Siam. Provisions that Harris gained more than Bowring Treaty were;

1. Harris' Siamese Treaty immediately took effect upon signature, in contrast to the Bowring Treaty, which was set to take effect about one year after signing.
2. As a consequence, the United States was entitled to immediately appoint a Consul to exert extraterritorial jurisdiction in Siam.

The United States had already been accorded permission to appoint a Consul to Siam by Article X of the 1833 Roberts Treaty, which stipulated that if Siam enabled any other Western nations than Portugal to have Consulate, the United States would be automatically allowed to have a Consulate. In this case, Siam had already allowed Britain to appoint Consul to Siam in Bowring Treaty, even though a British Consul had not arrived yet. The British were subjected to even more restrictions as they could only appoint a Consul to Siam at fulfillment of certain conditions. Before his departure from Siam in May 1856, Harris appointed Stephen Mattoon as the first U.S. Consul to Siam, before arrival of the first British Consul Charles Hillier to Siam in June. This provision also affected Siam's future agreements with other Western nations, in which Siam allowed Western envoys to appoint Consuls to Siam upon their departures. The treaty was done in English and Thai language versions. The treaty could also be amended after the lapse of ten years upon ratification, with consent of both parties.

=== Reaffirmation of relations ===
Article I of the treaty reaffirmed perpetual peace between Kingdom of Siam and the United States with a slightly different wording than the 1833 Treaty;

There shall henceforward be perpetual peace and friendship, between the United States, and their Majesties the First and Second Kings of Siam and their successors.

In the Bowring Treaty, Siam promised protection to British subjects and Britain, in turn, also reciprocally promised protection to Siamese subjects in British territories. However, as the United States did not possess any territories adjacent nor bordering Siam and very few Siamese would ever go to the United States due to long distance, the United States could not reciprocally grant protection to the Siamese in return. Townsend Harris then came up with the treaty term that the United States would provide protection to Siamese seagoing vessels anywhere in the world where an American warship or an American Consulate had authority and by doing so not breaching neutrality;

In as much as Siam has no ships, trading to the Ports of the United States, it is agreed that the ship of war of the United States shall render friendly aid and assistance to such Siamese vessels as they may meet on the high seas, so far as can be done, without a breach of neutrality and all American Consuls, residing at Ports, visited by Siamese vessels, shall also give them such friendly aid, as may be permitted by the laws, of the respective Countries in which they reside.

Two months later, the Siamese also asked the French envoy Charles de Montigny in his treaty for French protection to any Siamese vessels around the world where French authority existed, to which Montigny only agreed on assumption that the Siamese would not venture out in great numbers. Siam's subsequent treaties with other Western powers also contained the provisions that those Western nations would globally protect the Siamese in their dominions.

Article IV of the preceding Roberts Treaty did not fully grant the Most Favored Nation Status to the United States as it only stated that if Siam reduced duties for other Western nations, the Americans would also be accorded the same duties reduction. Article X of this Harris Treaty officially granted the Most Favored Nation status to the United States, meaning that if Siam were to grant any rights or privileges to any other nations, the Americans would be automatically entitled to such rights and privileges;

The American Government and its citizens, will be allowed free and equal participation in any privileges that may have been, or may hereafter be granted by the Siamese Government to the Government, Citizens or Subjects of any other nation.

=== Consular and Extraterritorial Jurisdiction ===
In the same manner as the Bowring Treaty, in this Harris Treaty, Siam allowed the United States to appoint Consul and establish Consulate in Bangkok to oversee American citizens in Siam, who would be subjected to American consular authority not subjected to native traditional Siamese law and judiciary. Nationality of the defendant determined the jurisdiction. Any legal cases concerning American subjects as defendants would be judged by the American Consul, while legal cases with a Siamese as defendant would go to Siamese courts.

The interests of all American citizens, coming to Siam, shall be placed under the regulations and control of a Consul, who will be appointed to reside at Bangkok.

Any disputes arising between American Citizens and Siamese Subjects, shall be heard and determined by the Consul in conjunction with the proper Siamese Officers; and criminal offenses will be punished in the case of American Offenders, by the Consul, according to American laws, and in the case of Siamese Offenders, by their own laws, through the Siamese Authorities. But the Consul shall not interfere in any matters, referring solely to the Siamese, neither will the Siamese Authorities interfere in questions, which only concern the Citizens of the United States.

Unlike the British and the French, the Americans did not manage to find a permanent Consulate place in Bangkok until 1866. According to a writing of Dan Beach Bradley in 1866, the American Consulate in Bangkok moved between at least ten different places during the period of ten years from 1856 to 1866. Bradley gave the reason of the wandering of the American Consulate as the American government treating the Consulate in Siam as a pioneer and probation rather than a permanent agency with consular works tying closely to personal lives of individual Consuls. In April 1866, the American Consulate took a permanent place at a brick house belonging to Pickenpack, Thies & Co., a German trading company in Bangkok, in modern Yannawa. Establishment of American Consulate in this place remained uncertain until King Chulalongkorn granted a house in front of Wat Muangkhae Temple in Bangrak to the U.S. Minister to Siam John A. Halderman to lease as the American Embassy in 1884.

=== Commerce ===
Exemption of American merchants from the monopoly of Phra Khlang Sinkha or Royal Warehouse, stipulated in the Roberts Treaty, was reaffirmed, in which the Americans were allowed to trade freely with anybody in Siam without intervention of a third party; "American Citizens are permitted to trade freely in all the Sea-ports of Siam,".

Measurement duties (Thai: ภาษีปากเรือ Phasi Pak Ruea), which had been collected according to the width of incoming American merchant vessels, at the rate of 1,700 ticals per fathom, stipulated in Article III of the Roberts Treaty, was abolished in favor of a general three-percent tariff, which would be paid in cash or in kind, Ad valorem, only once all through a commercial venture in Siam. If the import duty was paid but the merchandise was not sold and had to be taken out of Siam, the paid import duty would be refunded to the American merchant.

The measurement duty hitherto paid, by American vessels, trading to Bangkok, under the Treaty of 1833, shall be abolished from the date of this Treaty coming into operation,

On the articles of Import, the duty shall be three percent, payable at option of the Importer, either in kind or in money, calculated upon the market value of the goods. Drawback of the full amount of duty shall be allowed upon goods found unsaleable and reëxported.

For export duties, which were to be paid only once, a table affixing to this treaty was produced to specify the export duty rate of each individual commodities. The commodities were divided into groups;

- Commodities whose export duties were paid internally within Siamese territories, called Inland Duties, and whose export duty would not be further collected upon departure from Siam, including sugar, pepper, salted fish, etc.
- Commodities whose export duties were paid only once at the custom upon departure of American merchants from Siam, including rice, ivory, gambodge, rhinoceros horns, cardamoms, etc.

American merchants coming to trade in Siam were subjected to Siamese trade regulations affixed to this treaty, the General Regulations under which American Trade is to be conducted in Siam, which were identical to the regulations Siam imposed on the British and other Westerners who would later arrive to conclude treaties with Siam;

- American merchant ships, upon arrival in Siam, should report to the custom house at Samut Prakarn downstream from Bangkok, where they would surrender all their weapons and ammunitions, which would be returned upon their departure. Any American ships proceeding towards Bangkok without completing this procedure would be subjected to a fine of 800 baht (ticals) and the offending ships would not be allowed to go further without completion of the required process.
- Upon arrival in Bangkok, the American ships should report to the American Consul within twenty-four hours the items of imported cargo in order for import duties to be collected, with exception on Sundays, which were Christian holidays. Failure to report in time or falsifying the report would be subjected to a fine of 400 baht.
- American merchant ships engaging in any kind of exchanges and trades before completion of these procedures would be subjected to a fine of 800 baht.

In shortage situation, the Siamese government could prohibit export of rice, fish or salt. However, such ban should be announced one month in advance.

=== Travel and Land Ownership ===
American citizens in Siam were allowed to reside, rent houses and buy lands only within the area of twenty-four hour boat journey from Bangkok in all directions but could not own lands within the "Inner Zone" of 200 Sen or four miles from the Bangkok city walls. The Americans could only reside and rent houses in this Inner Zone and would be able to buy and own lands in this Inner Zone only when they had been living in Siam for at least ten years or they had been specifically permitted by the Siamese government. Demarcations and boundaries of these four-mile and the twenty-four hour boat distances from Bangkok had been defined by the Anglo–Siamese Agreement of May 1856 concluded between the British envoy Harry Parkes and the Siamese.

American Citizens coming to reside at Bangkok, may rent land and buy or build houses, but cannot purchase land within a circuit of two hundred Seng (not more than four miles English) from the city walls, until they shall have lived in Siam for ten years, or shall obtain special authority from the Siamese government, to enable them to do so. But with the exception of this limitation, American Residents in Siam, may at any time buy or rent houses, lands or plantations, situated anywhere within a distance of twenty four hours journey from the city of Bangkok, to be computed by the rate at which boats of the country can travel.

Article V of the treaty stated that the Americans in Siam should register themselves to the American Consul in order to obtain identification passports. The Americans were also permitted to travel within only the twenty-four hour distance from Bangkok. If they wanted to go outside this designated area, they had to acquire a special permission from the Siamese government through the American Consul beforehand. The Siamese police were empowered to arrest and detain any Americans who had contravened this law by failure to produce proper passports upon inspection or venturing outside of the area without proper permissions. The Congress had rejected this Article V, not intending to empower any foreign governments to arrest or detain the Americans but the Siamese insisted on inclusion of this term, which was exactly identical to the corresponding article of the Bowring Treaty, sine qua non. This article was then reintroduced as Regulation VII into the General Regulations on Trade;

The Siamese officers at the government stations in the interior may at any time call for production of this pass; and immediately on its being exhibited they must allow the parties to proceed; but it will be their duty to detain those persons who, by travelling without a pass from the consul, render themselves liable to the suspicion of their being deserters, and such detention shall be immediately reported to the consul.

=== Other provisions ===
- The Americans in Siam were allowed to hire the local Siamese as their employees. However, as most Siamese men had been traditionally under corvée or service obligations to the elites, the Siamese "masters" might "reclaim" such Siamese employees under the Americans. If any Siamese under American employment in Siam were legally accused, such Siamese were to be under American consular protection and would be repatriated to the Siamese authorities only when the American Consul found the Siamese to be guilty.
- This treaty also guaranteed freedom of religion for the Americans in Siam, in which the Americans were allowed to practice their religion, in this case mostly Protestantism, and to build churches without hindrance. However, this treaty did not go as far as the French Treaty, which granted extensive rights on missionary activities and proselytization.
- In the same manner of the British, the Americans could only bring their warships to Siam by first reporting to the Paknam Fort at Samut Prakarn. Only with the consent of the Siamese government that such American warships could proceed upstream to Bangkok and when they went to Bangkok, they could ascend no further than the Pong Patchamit Fort (in modern Thonburi district) and the Pit Patchaneuk Fort (modern Samphanthawong district, the two forts were on both banks of the Chaophraya river), which were about 2.5 kilometers downstream from the actual Bangkok Fort. This was also in contrast to the French, who were generally allowed to ascend up to Bangkok with less restrictions and guarding clauses.
