= Franco-Siamese Treaty of 1856 =

Unequal treaty in modern-day Thailand

Franco–Siamese Treaty of 1856
Treaty of Friendship, Commerce and Navigation, between Siam and France
- Type: Unequal Treaty
- Signed: 15 August 1856
- Location: Thonburi Palace, Bangkok
- Ratified: 24 August 1857
- Expiration: 12 January 1926 (68 years); Franco–Siamese Treaty of 1925
- Signatories: (Second French Empire) Charles de Montigny; (Thailand) Wongsathirat Sanit (Thailand) Somdet Chaophraya Phichaiyat (That Bunnag) (Thailand) Chaophraya Si Suriyawong (Chuang Bunnag) (Thailand) Chaophraya Rawiwong (Kham Bunnag) (Thailand) Chaophraya Yommarat Nuch
- Parties: Second French Empire; (Thailand) Kingdom of Siam
- Language: French; Thai

Treaty of Friendship, Commerce and Navigation, between Siam and France (French: Traité d'Amitié de Commerce et de Navigation, entre le Siam et le France, Thai: หนังสือสัญญาทางพระราชไมตรีประเทศสยามแลประเทศฝรั่งเศส) was a treaty between Second French Empire under Emperor Napoleon III and the Siamese Rattanakosin Kingdom under King Mongkut or King Rama IV of Siam, signed on 15 August 1856 as one of many unequal treaties that Siam concluded with Western nations during this period, opening the new stage of Franco–Siamese relations in the era of Western imperialism.

This Franco–Siamese Treaty of 1856 was based on the preceding Anglo–Siamese Bowring Treaty of April 1855, also based on the Sino–French Treaty of Whampoa (1844). This treaty resulted from early stages of French expansion into the Far East in competition with Great Britain, also the result of Siamese efforts to establish relations with France in order to counter-balance other Western powers, namely Britain. In 1855, Emperor Napoleon III of France appointed Charles de Montigny the French Consul at Shanghai as French imperial plenipotentiary to negotiate a new diplomatic and commercial treaty with Siam (now Thailand). This was the first Franco–Siamese official diplomatic engagement since the late seventeenth century during the reigns of King Louis XIV of France and King Narai of Ayutthaya. Montigny arrived in Bangkok, Siam's royal capital, in July 1856. King Mongkut appointed five Siamese plenipotentiaries to discuss the new treaty with Montigny, leading to the conclusion and signing of the treaty on August 15, 1856. This Franco–Siamese treaty, negotiated by Montigny, contained twenty-four articles. The main terms of this treaty were;

- Establishment of French consular authority and French extraterritorial jurisdiction in Siam
- Siamese commercial concessions to France, including the low, fixed-rate import duty of three percent
- Siamese guarantee of freedom of Christian proselytization in Siam
- Right of residence and land ownership for French subjects in Siam, only in the area surrounding Bangkok

These treaty terms were mostly the same as the Anglo–Siamese Bowring Treaty, concluded in April 1855 between Siam and Great Britain. Many treaty terms were also introduced from the Sino–French Whampoa Treaty. Clause on the matters concerning Catholic propagation of faith in Siam was of special concern. Another important clause of this treaty was the unrestricted access of French warships to Bangkok, resulting in the French sending warships to Bangkok to impose gunboat diplomacy on Siam in 1865 and 1893.

The Franco–Siamese Treaty of 1856 remained in effect for 68 years. French extraterritorial jurisdiction in Siam was partially curtailed by the Franco-Siamese treaty of 1907, in which Siam ceded Northwestern Cambodia including Battambang, Siemreap and Sisophon to French Indochina. In 1924, Francis Bowes Sayre, an American Harvard Law professor, acting as the representative of Siam, went on a European tour to negotiate new treaties with various European nations on behalf of Siam, leading to the conclusion of the Franco–Siamese Treaty of 1925, which abolished most of the terms of the Franco–Siamese Treaty of 1856, including the low import duties and most of the French consular and extraterritorial jurisdiction in Siam.

== History of Franco–Siamese relations ==
=== Early relations ===
Alexandre de Rhodes, the French Jesuit missionary, was expelled by both the Trinh Lord of Tonkin (Northern Vietnam) and the Nguyen Lord of Cochinchina (Central Vietnam) in his attempt to spread Catholicism in Vietnam. Alexandre de Rhodes proposed Pope Innocent X to send more missionaries and to train local priests in the Far East in order to effectively make conversions in the region, leading to foundation of Paris Foreign Missions Society (French: Société des Missions Etrangères de Paris, MEP) in 1658. Pierre Lambert de la Motte, a French secular priest and the newly appointed Apostolic Vicar of Cochin, arrived in Ayutthaya the Siamese royal capital in 1663 on his way to Vietnam. However, the general anti-Christian attitude of the Vietnamese lords kept De la Motte in Siam. Even though Siam was not his direct responsibility, De la Motte saw Siam as a tolerant Asian kingdom, where Catholic churches stood and Catholics could practice their religion without being persecuted. Pope Alexander VII established the Apostolic vicariate of Siam in 1663. Meanwhile, the Dutch East India Company was in its apogee of political and commercial influence in Southeast Asia. Dutch naval blockade on Ayutthaya in 1663 led to the conclusion of Dutch–Siamese Treaty of 1664, in which, among many concessions, was the first known partial Western extraterritorial jurisdiction in Siam. If a Dutch merchant committed a grave crime in Siam, the case was to be judged by the Dutch opperhoofd in Ayutthaya not by the Siamese authorities.

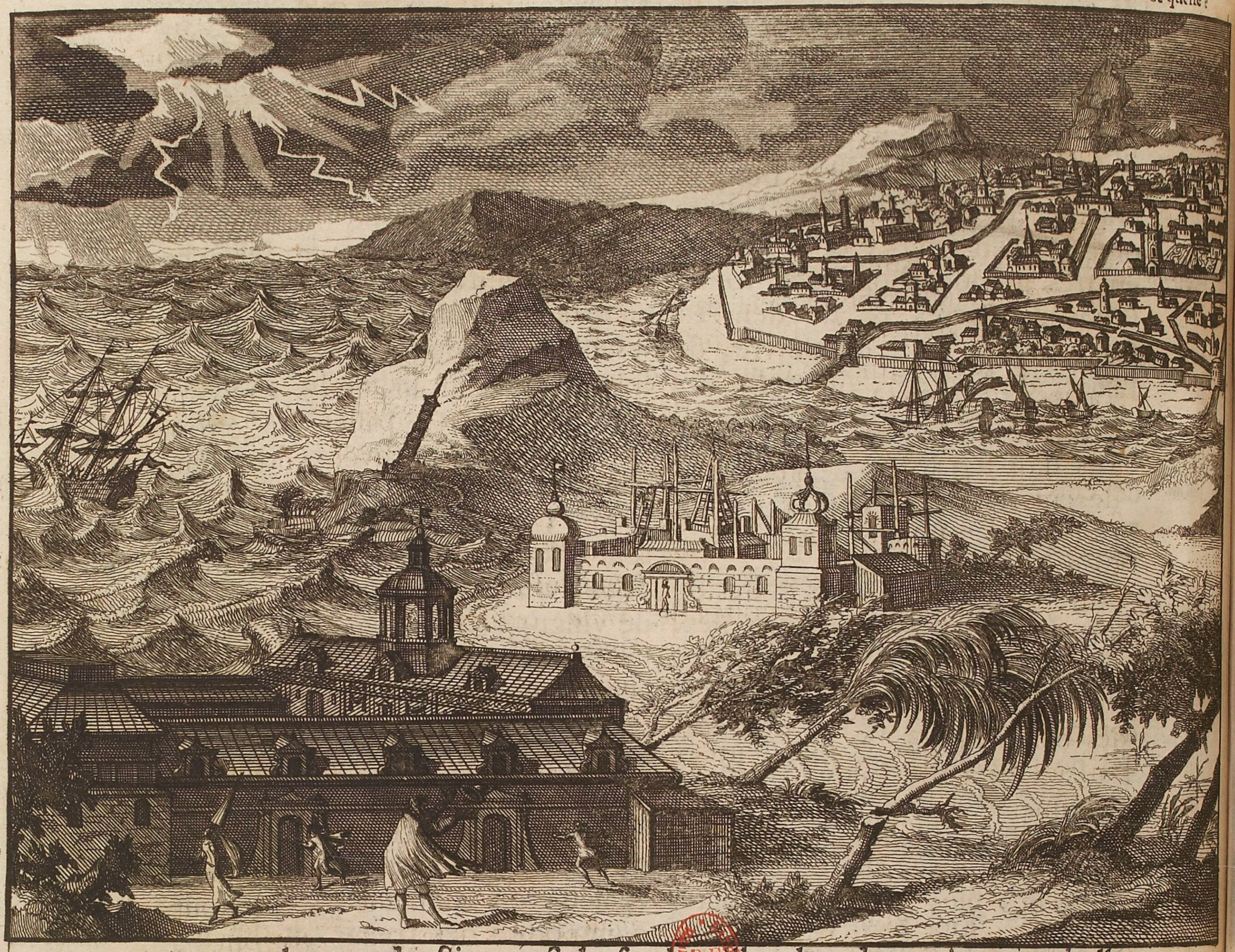
Seminary of Saint Joseph was built in 1665 on the land of Bangplahet in Ayutthaya granted by King Narai of Siam to the French priest Pierre Lambert de la Motte. The seminary later moved back and forth between Bangplahet and Mahaphram (in northwestern outskirt of Ayutthaya).

In 1665, King Narai of Siam granted the land of Bangplahet in Ayutthaya for De la Motte to build a church, the Seminary of Saint Joseph, which would be the main base for French Catholic missionary activities in the region until its destruction in 1767. Advancement of French MEP priests in Siam and Vietnam also served to pioneer French political and commercial interests. De la Motte reported to the French court of King Louis XIV that the Siamese king Narai was interested in Christianity and could possibly be converted. Early Franco–Siamese relations focused on the religious issues. In 1669, Pope Clement IX appointed Louis Laneau as the first Apostolic Vicar of Siam, also assigning François Pallu the Apostolic Vicar of Tonkin to bring the papal letter to the Siamese king Narai. In 1670, the French king Louis XIV, hoping for the Siamese king to convert, also wrote a royal letter to Narai, which François Pallu was to bring to Siam. François Pallu and Louis Laneau reached Siam in 1673. Pallu and De la Motte presented papal and French royal letters to King Narai, who received the letters with solemn ceremonies. Even though his responsible area was in Vietnam, De la Motte spent most of his time in Siam. De la Motte died at Ayutthaya in 1679.

Franco–Siamese relations then entered the political and commercial sphere. In 1680, François Martin the Governor-General of French India at Pondicherry sent André Deslandes-Boureau in the ship Vautour as the delegate of French East India Company (French: Compagnie des Indes Orientales, CIO) to establish commercial relation with Siam. This was the first official diplomatic contact between France and Siam. The French arrived just in time King Narai needed another Western nation to counter the Dutch influence. Next year, in 1681, King Narai sent a Siamese diplomatic mission to France under the Siamese envoy Okya Phiphatkosa the deputy Minister of Trade, boarding on the French ship Soleil d'Orient. However, the Soleil d'Orient shipwrecked off the coast of Madagascar and the whole crew was lost, including the Siamese envoys, presumed dead. In 1684, Deslandes-Boureau the French delegate in Ayutthaya concluded the Franco–Siamese Treaty of 1684, the first known Franco–Siamese treaty, with the Siamese court, in which French East India Company was granted free trade in Siam and monopoly over pepper export from Siam.

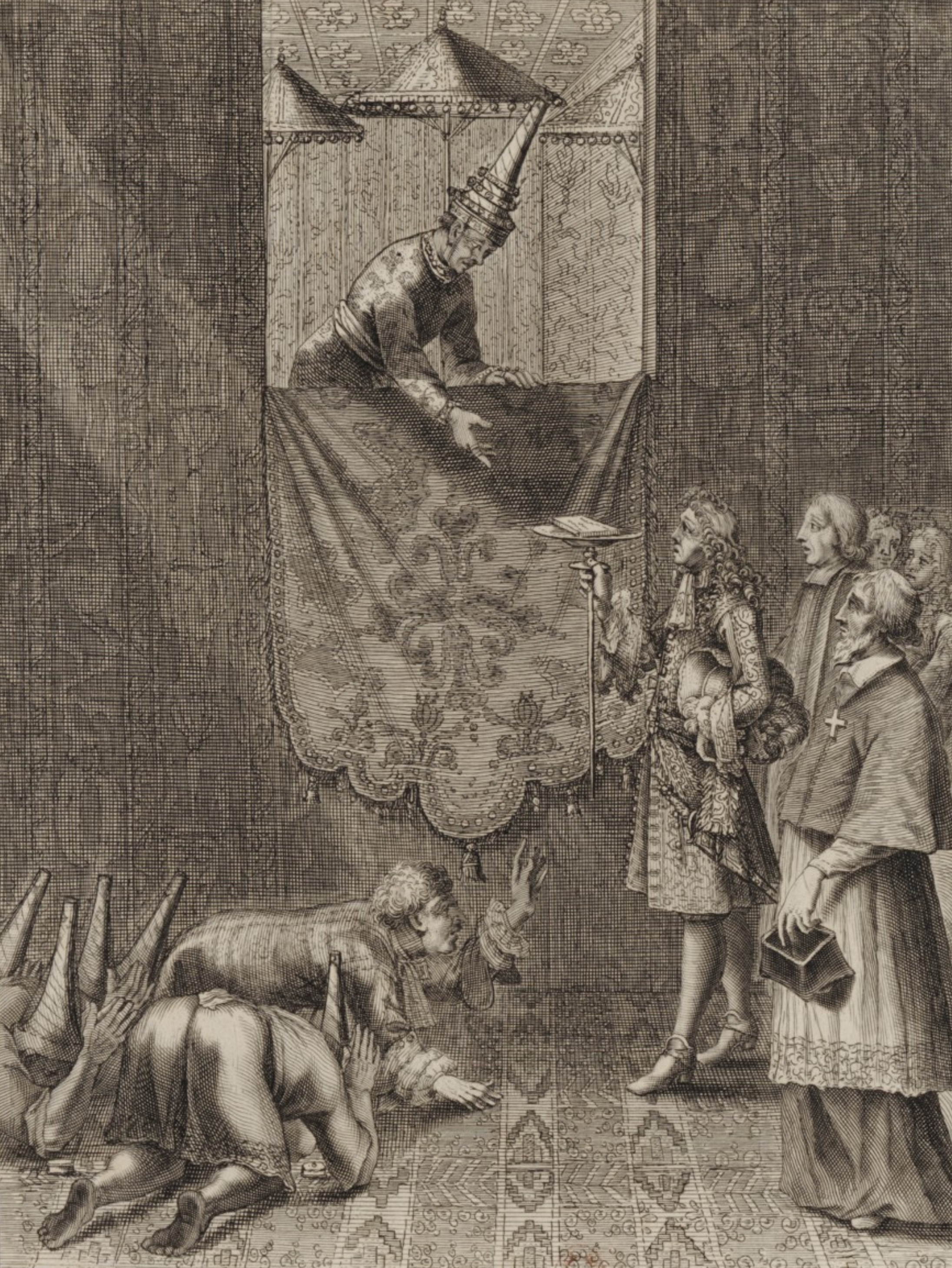
French envoy Chevalier de Chaumont presented royal letter from French king Louis XIV to King Narai of Siam in October 1685 at Sanphet Prasat Throne Hall in Ayutthaya, with Constantine Phaulkon prostrating and making instructing gesture on the floor.

Advent of Franco–Siamese relations coincided with the rise of Constantine Phaulkon, a Greek adventurer and former employee of English East India Company. By 1684, Phaulkon had become de facto Chief Minister of Siam with title Okya Wichaiyen (Thai: ออกญาวิไชเยนทร์). In his plan to put himself in power, Phaulkon conspired with the French to convert the Siamese king Narai to Catholicism. In 1684, the French MEP priest Bénigne Vachet brought the Siamese mission led by two Siamese envoys Okkhun Phichaiwathit and Okkhun Phichit Maitri to France. These two Siamese envoys were the first Siamese delegates to successfully reach France and they were granted audience with the French king Louis XIV in the Palace of Versailles. Vachet told King Louis XIV in private audience that there was a man named Phaulkon in Siam who would collaborate with the French to convert King Narai to Christianity. King Louis XIV then sent the first French diplomatic mission to Siam led by Chevalier de Chaumont, reaching Ayutthaya in 1685 with the ship Oiseau. French mission to Siam had two goals; the religious goal that was to convert the Siamese king to Catholicism and the commercial goal that was to procure trade concessions from Siam. Even though King Narai did not convert, the Franco–Siamese Treaty of 1685 did secure trade benefits for CIO. The treaty was composed of a religious treaty and a commercial treaty. The religious treaty granted freedom of Christian proselytization in Siam. The commercial treaty exempted French East India Company from all kinds of duties (but could only trade with Phra Khlang Sinkha or Royal Warehouse), granted tin export monopoly from Phuket to the French Company and permitted the French to settle in Songkhla in Southern Siam. The treaty also granted French extraterritorial jurisdiction in Siam, in which any legal cases involving French subjects as defendants, in both civil and criminal cases, the case was to be judged by the French delegate in Ayutthaya not subjected to traditional Siamese judicial system.

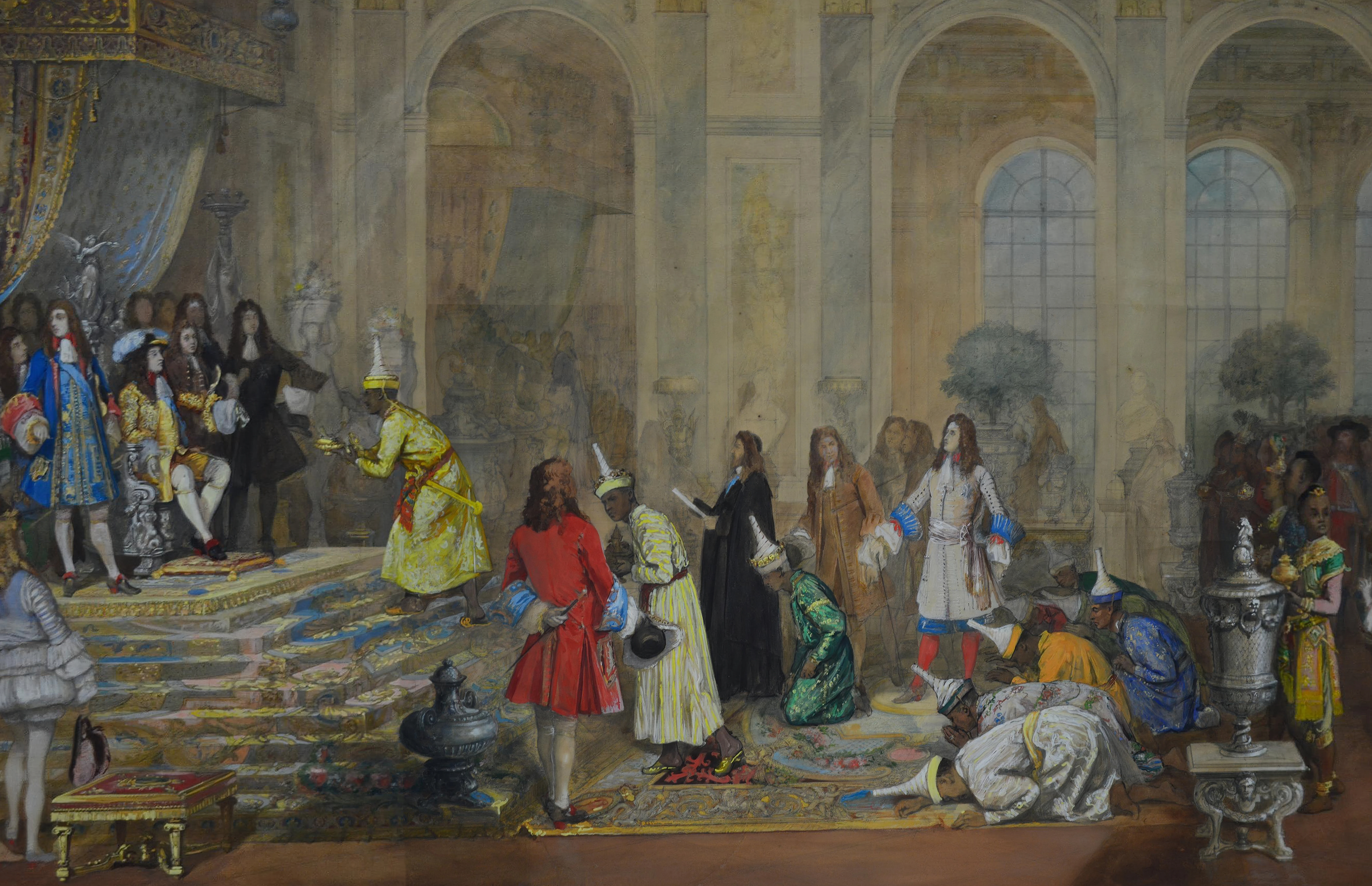
Siamese Embassy to France: The Siamese envoy Okphra Wisut Sunthorn, later known as Kosa Pan, presented the royal letter from King Narai to French king Louis XIV in the audience in the Hall of Mirrors at Versailles in September 1686.

Constantine Phaulkon then conspired with the French Jesuit priest Guy Tachard to bring the French to conquer Siam. In 1686, King Narai sent another diplomatic mission under Okphra Wisut Sunthorn to France. Guy Tachard, who accompanied the Siamese to France, secretly informed the French royal court about Phaulkon's plan. The French saw that Songkhla, which Siam allowed the French to settle, was too far from Ayutthaya and they demanded Bangkok and Mergui instead. King Louis XIV sent the second French diplomatic mission to Siam led by Simon de la Loubère to convert King Narai and Claude Céberet du Boullay to negotiate for commercial concessions, along with General Desfarges who brought 636 French soldiers to Siam. The French diplomatic mission reached Siam in 1687 as King Narai allowed French soldiers to garrison in Bangkok and Mergui at the discontent of native Siamese mandarins. To La Loubère's disappointment, Narai still did not convert. Franco–Siamese Treaty of 1687, signed by La Loubère and Okya Phrasadet the Phrakhlang or Minister of Trade and Foreign Affairs, was similar to the previous 1685 treaty but French extraterritorial jurisdiction in Siam was expanded as Véret the head of French trade factory in Siam would govern over French subjects in Siam. All employees of the French East India Company, regardless of nationalities, would be considered French subjects. In legal cases that French subjects were defendants, Véret the French headman in Siam would jointly judge the case with Siamese officials and Véret would have a definitive voice (voix définitive).

=== Siamese Revolution of 1688 ===
As Siam's sovereignty was under threat, with French soldiers garrisoned at Bangkok and Mergui, a native Siamese mandarin Okphra Phetracha led a nationalistic movement against the growing French influence in Siam. In his ninety-minute speech, Okphra Phetracha attempted to dissuade King Narai from over-relying on the French but to no avail. Phetracha also spread propaganda about Okya Wichayen Phaulkon and the French conspiring to conquer Siam and to destroy Theravada Buddhism. Nevertheless, in January 1688, King Narai commissioned the French Jesuit priest Guy Tachard, accompanied by three Siamese mandarins Okmuen Phiphitracha, Okkhun Wiset Phuban and Okkhun Chamnan Chaichong, to return with La Loubère to Europe to present Siamese royal letters to the French king and the Pope. In March 1688, King Narai fell terminally ill. Both Phaulkon and Phetracha strove to seize power. Like King Louis XIV who resided in Versailles, King Narai had been residing in Lopburi in his retreat from Ayutthaya. Phaulkon requested General Desfarges to bring French troops from Bangkok to support Phaulkon at Lopburi. However, upon reaching Ayutthaya, Desfarges was falsely informed that King Narai had already died so Desfarges and his troops returned to Bangkok. Absence of Desfarges in Lopburi allowed Phetracha to prevail over Phaulkon. Phetracha seized King Narai's Palace at Lopburi and had Phaulkon executed in May 1688. In June, Phetracha sent Siamese forces to besiege Desfarges at Bangkok. King Narai died in July 1688 as Phetracha usurped the throne as King Phetracha the new king of Siam, founding the Ban Phlu Luang dynasty that would rule Siam until the Fall of Ayutthaya in 1767. Kosa Pan, formerly known as Okphra Wisut Sunthorn who led diplomatic mission to France in 1686, was made Phrakhlang or Foreign Minister under Phetracha.

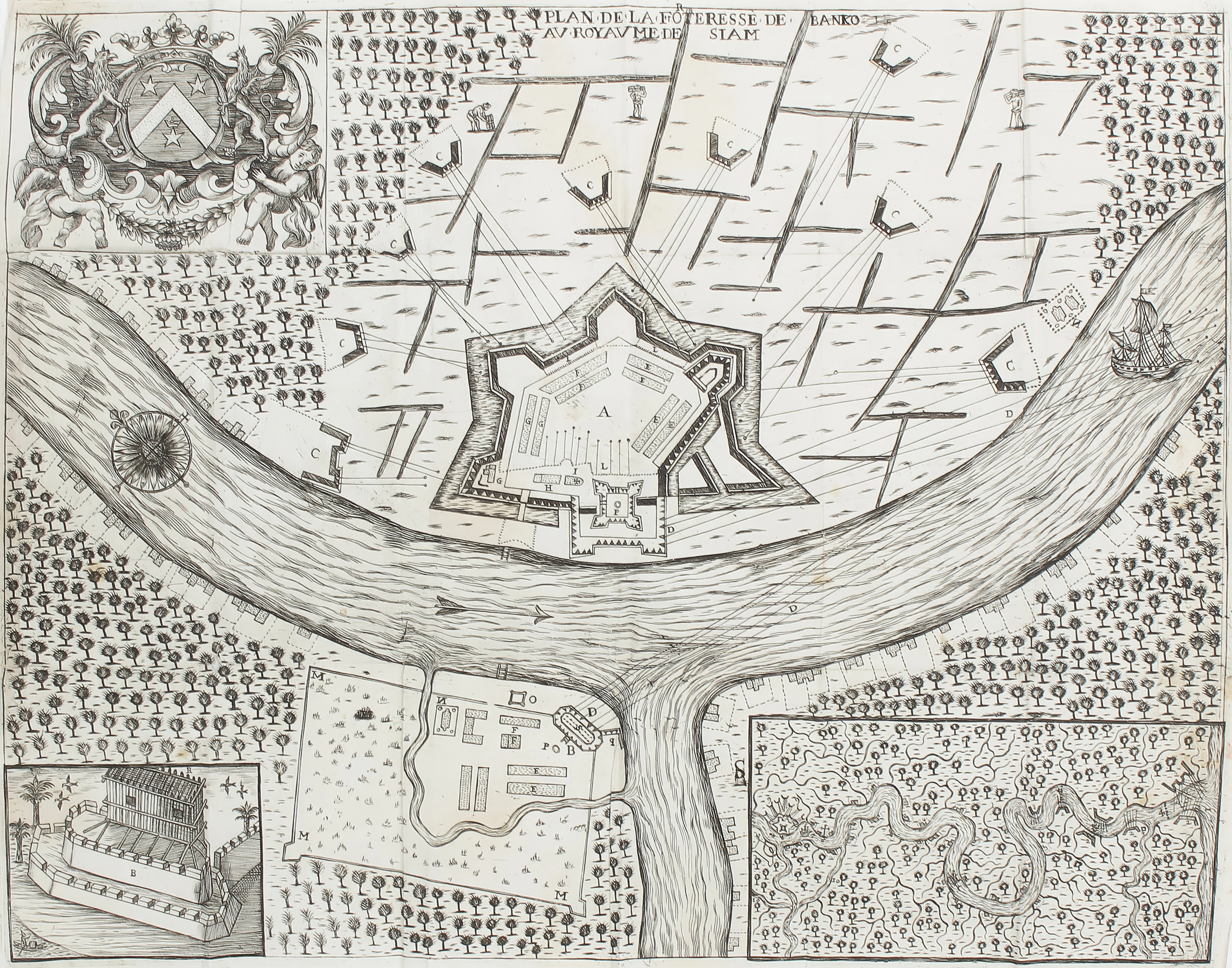
Siege of Bangkok: Siamese siege on the French-held Bangkok fort from June to November 1688

After five months of Siamese siege on the French-held Bangkok fort, an agreement was reached in November 1688, in which Kosa Pan allowed Desfarges and the French to peacefully retreat from Siam. Bishop Louis Laneau the Apostolic Vicar of Siam was posed as the guarantor of the terms and hostages were exchanged. Three Siamese nobles were sent to Desfarges as hostages and Véret the French headman was sent to the Siamese closely following behind. However, upon reaching the bar of Chaophraya River, Desfarges decided not to trust the Siamese and broke the terms by retrieving Véret and seizing the Siamese hostages to leave Siam, ending one-year presence of French troops in Siam. Desfarges and Véret brought Siamese hostages to Pondicherry in French India. Kosa Pan, as Desfarges did not return the Siamese hostages, punished Bishop Laneau, who was the guarantor of the terms Desfarges had broken. Bishop Laneau, along with French Catholic priests, French officials and French merchants in Siam, were arrested, imprisoned and subjected to most horrifying tortures and treatment, some of them even died in the process. At Pondicherry, Desfarges discussed with François Martin the Governor-General of French India to exact revenge on Siam. Martin suggested that Desfarges should seized Junkceylon (Phuket) as leverage in order to force a new humiliating treaty from Siam. Desfarges brought 330 French soldiers on a warship to Phuket in April 1689. From Phuket, Desfarges and Véret sent letters to Kosa Pan, demanding Siam to negotiate a new treaty and to cede Phuket to France. Kosa Pan, however, did not care about Desfarges and Véret. Desfarges anchored his warship on the shore of Phuket for seven months but was unable to push his demand further for his fear of Siamese harm on the French prisoners. In November 1689, eventually, Desfarges returned the Siamese hostages and left Phuket empty-handed, thus ending the Franco–Siamese conflicts.

Guy Tachard and the Siamese envoys in Europe were not yet aware of King Narai's death and Siamese expulsion of the French under the new king Phetracha. Tachard led the Siamese envoys to present Narai's letters to Pope Innocent XI at Rome in December 1688 and to King Louis XIV at Versailles in February 1689. French royal court had been planning to send more troops to Siam but the news of the revolution at Siam reached France in November 1689. The War of the Grand Alliance kept France busy as France was unable to send any troops to Siam so King Louis XIV assigned Guy Tachard to restore relations with Siam, to convince the new Siamese king to honor the previous Franco–Siamese treaties and for Siam to cede Mergui to France. France had been eyeing Mergui on Tenasserim Coast as strategic port in Indian Ocean. Tachard brought the French royal letter to Pondicherry in 1690 but Kosa Pan the Phrakhlang denied Tachard's entry into Siam because Tachard had been Phaulkon's chief conspirator. In 1691, King Phetracha decided to restore relations with France. Kosa Pan released Bishop Laneau and other French prisoners in 1691. Phetracha sent his French interpreter Okluang Worawathi Vincent Pinheiro, a Siamese Catholic convert with Portuguese name, to Pondicherry to fetch Tachard to Ayutthaya. However, Tachard refused to go to Siam this time because Tachard had been tasked with asking Siam to cede Mergui and Tachard saw that this was not the right time to ask.

In 1693, the Dutch conquered Pondicherry with both François Martin the Governor of French India and Father Guy Tachard captured by the Dutch. Tachard was deported to Holland and was later released back to France. Tachard was unwavering in his mission to restore Franco–Siamese relations and arrived in Siam in 1695. However, Kosa Pan again denied entry of Tachard because Tachard arrived in a mere Portuguese merchant ship without proper diplomatic honors. After some struggles, François Martin the restored Governor of French India assigned a French warship to bring Tachard from Pondicherry to Ayutthaya. Tachard arrived in Mergui in October 1698 and was allowed to proceed to Ayutthaya. In a grand audience in January 1699, Siamese king Phetracha received Tachard, who presented the French royal letter of King Louis XIV from ten years ago in 1689. Tachard, however, did not dare to ask Phetracha to cede Mergui to France. Phetracha wrote a reply letter to King Louis but it was only a blank ceremonial praise on the French king without any concessions as the French had been expecting. Even though Tachard managed to deliver the French royal letter to the Siamese king in his ten-year struggle but his eventual mission to Siam achieved nothing for France. Kosa Pan died in late 1699. France sent an MEP priest Louis Quémener to Ayutthaya in 1700 to ask again for Siamese cession of Mergui but the Siamese royal court responded with strong words, invoking the events of 1688 and saying that Siam would never allow the French to station troops in Mergui again.

=== Ban on Christian evangelism in Siam ===
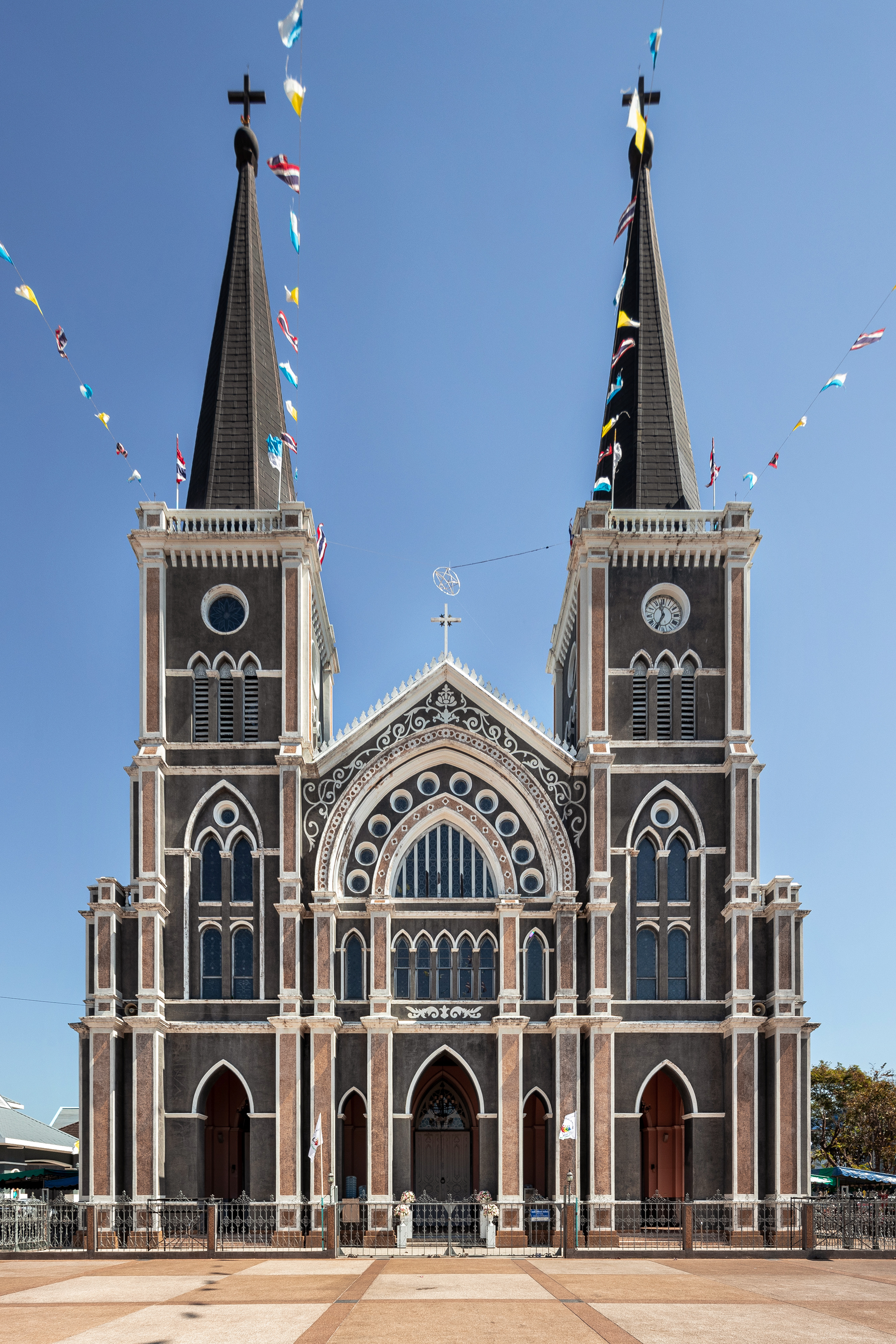
Church of Immaculate Conception of Chanthaburi was built in 1711 under supervision of Father Heutte to accommodate the Vietnamese Catholics fleeing persecutions from their homeland. Current structure was built in 1904 in Gothic Revival architecture.

Bishop Louis Laneau of MEP, the Apostolic Vicar of Siam, was arrested and imprisoned during the Siamese Revolution of 1688 for Laneau was the guarantor of the promise Desfarges had broken. Bishop Laneau was put in traditional Siamese Charit Nakhonban that were judiciary tortures including being chained in his neck in cangues, being whipped with rattan canes and being exposed to extreme heat of sunlight. Bishop Laneau was imprisoned for thirteen months until he was released, together with other French prisoners, in 1691. As Franco–Siamese diplomatic and commercial relations had not yet been restored, relations between France and Siam reverted to religious issues. Bishop Laneau died in Ayutthaya in 1697. Before his death, Laneau composed Encounter with Buddhist Sage (French: Rencontre avec un sage bouddhiste) about a fictional conversation between a Buddhist monk and a Catholic priest as a Christian catechism written in Siamese language. In this work, Laneau promoted Christianity as being superior to Buddhism. In 1700, Louis Champion de Cicé of MEP was appointed to succeed Laneau as the new Apostolic Vicar of Siam. Cicé arrived in Siam in 1702. In 1703, King Phetracha died and was succeeded by his son Phra Chao Suea as new king of Siam. Still hoping for commercial benefits, King Phra Chao Suea asked Cicé to write to the French at Pondicherry to resume commercial relations with Siam but the French would not renew any relations with Siam unless Siam agreed to cede Mergui to France. Cicé oversaw Portuguese Mestizo Catholics, Siamese and Vietnamese Catholics. Cicé was also accorded with temporal power as he judged legal disputes involving Catholics in Siam. There were Catholic communities in Ayutthaya, Mergui and Phuket. Church of Immaculate Conception was built at Chanthaburi in Eastern Siam in 1711 to accommodate the Vietnamese Catholics fleeing persecution from Vietnam there. During Cicé's tenure, Catholic missionaries were still allowed to freely preach Christianity.

After Cicé, Tessier de Quéralay of MEP was appointed to succeed Cicé in Siam. There was a Catholic named Laurent Teng in Siam, whose father was Chaophraya Phrakhlang Chin the previous Phrakhlang or Siamese Minister of Trade and Foreign Affairs of Chinese ethnicity and whose mother was a Vietnamese Catholic. Since childhood, Teng's mother had entrusted him to be a Catholic. In 1730, Teng was ordained as a Catholic priest but this action upset his Chinese paternal family, who filed the case to Prince Phon of the Front Palace, younger brother of the reigning king Thaisa (grandson of Phetracha), accusing the missionaries of coercing Teng to become Christian. Prince Phon summoned Teng to his palace, asking whether the Christian god could protect Teng from his princely power. Teng replied that Christian god could certainly do because the god was almighty. Angered, Prince Phon ordered Teng whipped with rattan canes and to remove his priestly robes, to shave his hair, wear yellow robe to become a Buddhist monk, to step on the Christian cross and to worship a Buddha image, in order to demonstrate that the power of the Christian god did not exceed his princely power. The prince then discovered Laneau's work Encounter with Buddhist Sage, which condemned Buddhism in favor of Christianity, written in Thai language using Khmer script. In Siamese Buddhism, the Khmer script, also called Pali script, was considered sacred and was used to inscribe Pali canon. Seeing this blasphemy on Buddhism, Prince Phon reported this matter to his older brother King Thaisa, who ordered Phraya Phichairacha the Phrakhlang, who was of Chinese ethnicity and had anti-Western attitude, to investigate. Bishop Quéralay and other French Catholic priests were arrested and put on Siamese judicial trial.

Phraya Phichairacha the Phrakhlang told the French priests that using the sacred Pali script to offend Buddhism was a great crime. Bishop Quéralay replied that if the Siamese king did not want Catholic priests to preach Christianity, he should allow them to leave Siam peacefully. Seeing this defiance, in January 1731, Phichairacha proposed a new law to King Thaisa forbidding the Christian missionaries from;

- Usage of Siamese script or Pali script (Khom Thai script) to write Christian catechisms.
- Proselytization on Siamese, Mon, Northern Thai and Lao people in Siam.
- Encouragement of the aforementioned Siamese, Mon, Northern Thai and Lao people to convert to Christianity.
- Condemning and offending Siamese Theravada Buddhism.

The Phrakhlang attempted to force Bishop Quéralay to accept and sign this new law but Quéralay refused, saying that this new order of the Siamese king was a contravention of his mission and could affect Franco–Siamese relations. Furious, Phraya Phichairacha proposed King Thaisa to expel all French Catholic priests from Siam but King Thaisa saw expulsion of French priests as too excessive so he allowed the French priests to stay but they should comply with the new law. Phichairacha then had a stone stele engraved with this new law banning Christian propagation of faith on native people placed in front of the Seminary in Ayutthaya in October 1731. During the event of 1730–1731, Catholics in Siam were persecuted. King Thaisa died in 1733, leading to a dynastic conflict between Prince Phon (Thaisa's younger brother) and two sons of Thaisa. Phichairacha the Phrakhlang sided with sons of Thaisa and, when Prince Phon prevailed, was executed. Prince Phon ascended the throne as King Borommakot the new king of Siam and appointed his supporter Chaophraya Chamnan Borirak as the new Phrakhlang.

Despite this persecution event, Westerners were allowed to practice Christianity freely in Siam but missionary works on native people were banned. Jean de Lolière-Puycontat of MEP arrived in Ayutthaya in 1742 as the new Apostolic Vicar. Lolière-Puycontat presented a royal letter from French king Louis XV to King Borommakot. King Borommakot wrote a reply to the French king but the French ship carrying the letter was caught by the British. In 1748, King Borommakot ordered Siamese Christian officials to join his royal procession to worship Buddha's Footprint at Saraburi. Bishop Lolière-Puycontat, however, refused to allow Siamese Christians to partake in this royal procession, even though Chamnan Borirak the Phrakhlang had explained to the bishop that Christians joining this procession would not be forced to partake in any Buddhist ceremonies. Enraged, King Borommakot ordered Phraya Tanaosi the governor of Tenasserim to place stone stele inscribed with the 1731 law banning Christian evangelism placed at the church at Mergui. Pierre Brigot, the French priest at Mergui, protested about this stone stele to the Tenasserim governor but to no avail. Pierre Brigot was appointed as new Apostolic Vicar of Siam in 1755.

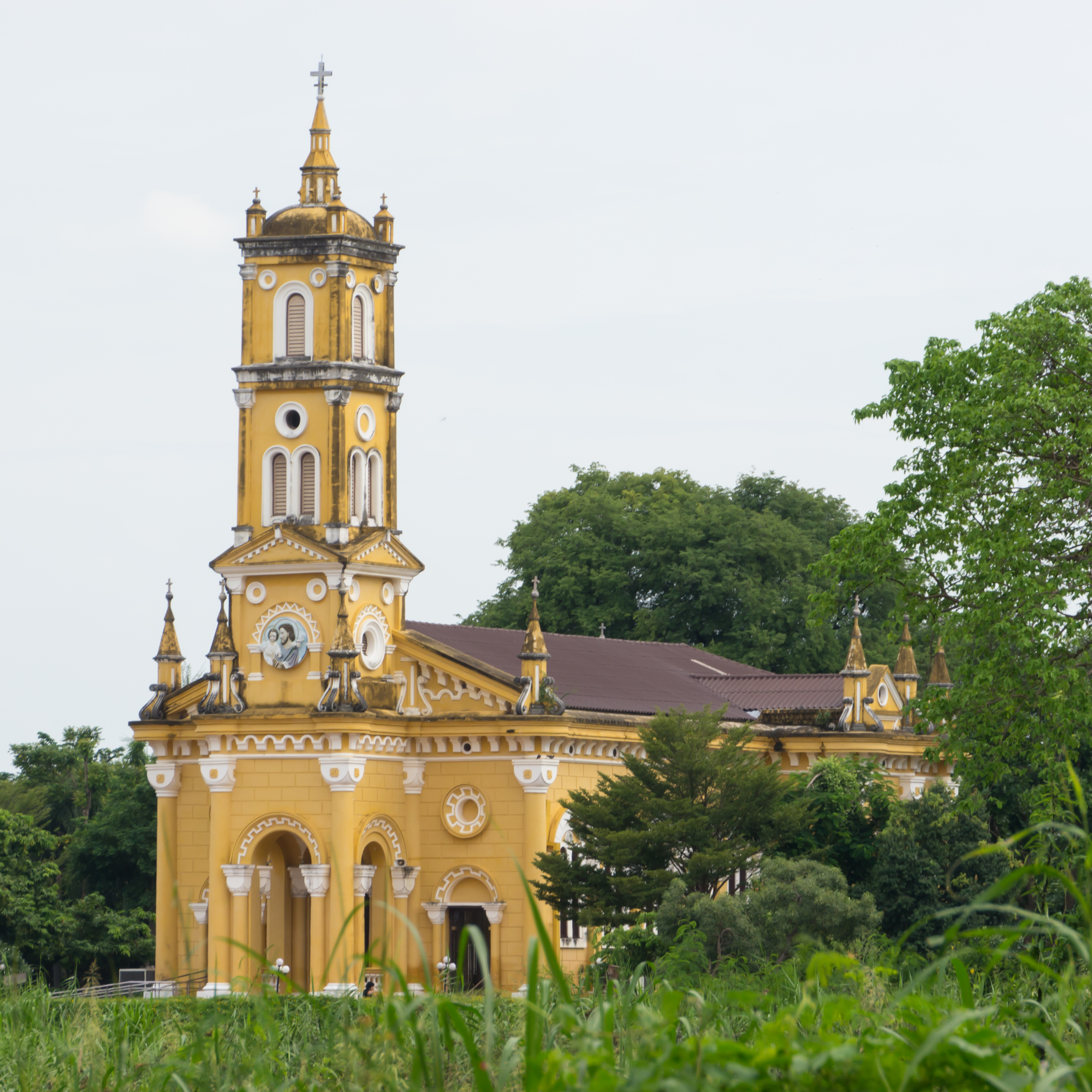
Seminary of Saint Joseph on the southern side of Ayutthaya, founded in 1665, was destroyed by the Burmese in March 1767, was rebuilt in 1831 by Jean-Baptiste Pallegoix as Saint Joseph's Church and was rebuilt in modern Neo-Romanesque architecture in 1883.

In the reign of King Ekkathat (Borommakot's son), the last king of Ayutthaya, the Burmese king Alaungpaya led the Burmese forces to attack Siam in early 1760. Alaungpaya attacked and seized Mergui in January 1760. French priests of Mergui fled across Indian Ocean to Pondicherry and, in doing so, they risked contravening the Siamese law concerning unauthorized exit from the kingdom. Five years later, in 1765, the Burmese commander Maha Nawrahta led the Burmese to attack Mergui again. A French priest capitalized this opportunity by destroying the stone stele banning Christian preaching at Mergui. However, all the French Catholic priests and Christians in Mergui were taken as captives by the Burmese to Tavoy. Maha Nawrahta then proceeded with his Burmese armies to lay siege on Ayutthaya in early 1766. Bishop Pierre Brigot led Christian gunners to successfully defend the Seminary of Saint Joseph, which located outside of the Ayutthaya citadel in the southern outskirt, from Burmese attacks. However, situation for the Ayutthayans had become detoriorated by early 1767. The Burmese lured Bishop Brigot into a peace negotiation but the Burmese detained Brigot and burnt down the Seminary, built in 1665, in March 1767. At the Fall of Ayutthaya in April 1767, Bishop Brigot, along with other Christians, were deported as captives by the Burmese to Burma. Brigot stayed in Rangoon in Lower Burma and then went to Pondicherry, never returning to Siam again. Some priests, however, managed to flee to Chanthaburi in Eastern Siam.

=== Catholic mission in Thonburi and Early Bangkok periods ===
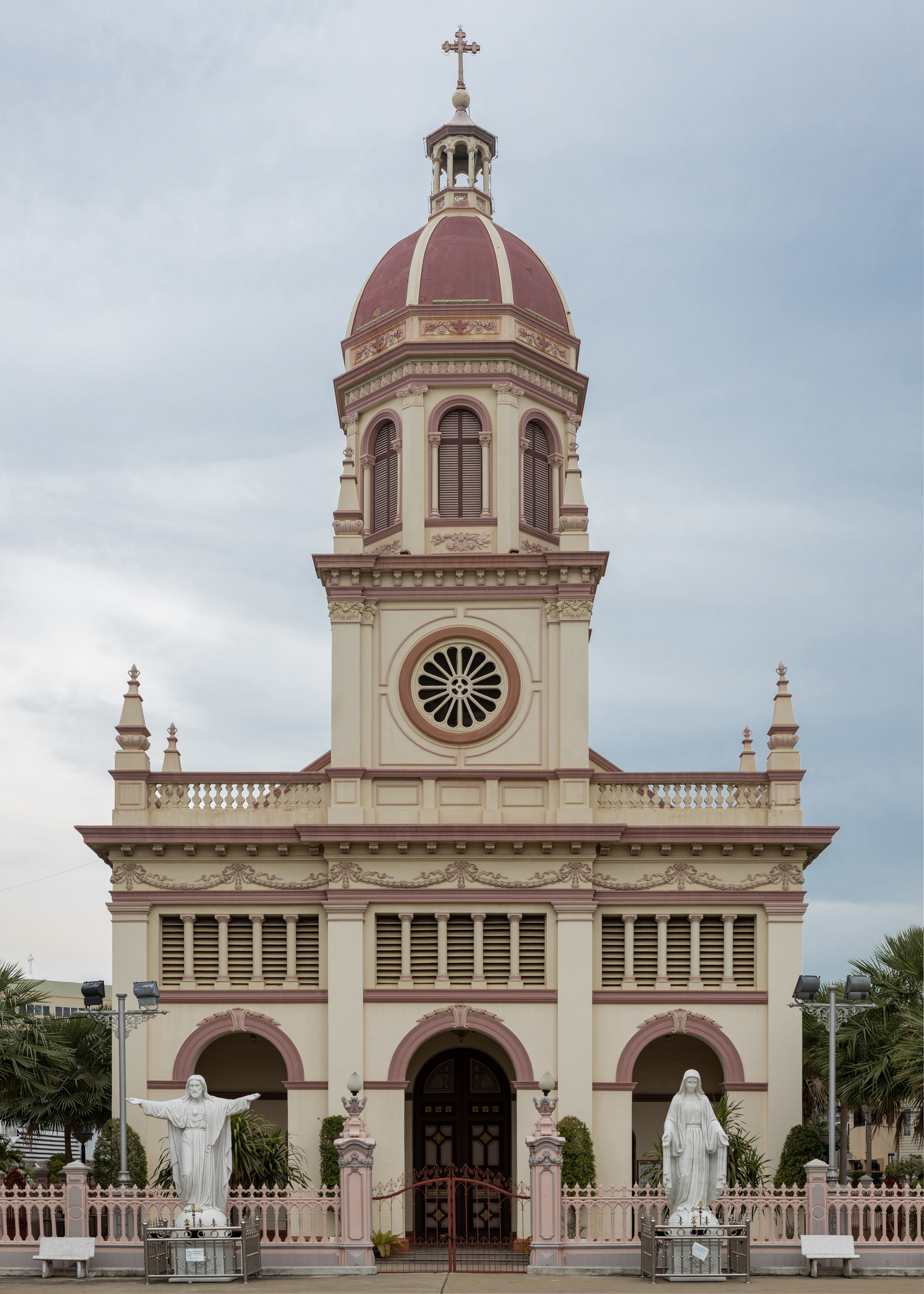
Santa Cruz Church in Kudichin was constructed in 1770 on the land granted by King Taksin to the French priest Jacques Corre. The church would be the seat of Apostolic vicars of Siam until 1821. The current structure is of Renaissance Revival style, built in 1913.

After the 1767 Fall of Ayutthaya, Father Jacques Corre, a French MEP priest who had taken refuge in Oudong the royal capital of Cambodia, knew that the Siamese had established the new capital at Thonburi under new king Taksin so Father Corre returned to Thonburi in 1769, where he found only 108 surviving Christians, most of them were of Portuguese–Siamese Mestizo descent. Father Corre was determined to restore Christian community in Siam. King Taksin granted a land in Kudichin for Jacques Corre to construct the Santa Cruz Church in 1770 as the new center of Catholic faith in Siam. Bishop Olivier-Simon Le Bon of MEP, the putative successor of Pierre Brigot, arrived in Thonburi in 1772 to restore the Apostolic vicariate of Siam. Le Bon arrived with his assistant Arnaud-Antoine Garnault. Le Bon and Garnault joined Jacques Corre at the Santa Cruz Church. Father Corre died in Thonburi in 1773 and Joseph-Louis Coudé, another MEP priest, arrived in Siam as his replacement. In Thonburi period, there were three French priests in Siam; Bishop Le Bon, Father Coudé and Father Garnault, in order of seniority.

In 1773, Siamese Christian officials, in the same manner as other officials, were to undergo the lustral-water-drinking ceremony to swear fealty to King Taksin. It was a Hindu–Buddhist ceremony, in which the Brahmins recited a curse mantra then a holy sword would be dipped into the lustral water. The water would then be distributed to the officials, who would drink the water while also swearing fealty to the king in the presence of a Buddha statue. Bishop Le Bon considered this ceremony to be a Buddhist ritual and discouraged Siamese Christian officials from participating. Le Bon proposed to the Siamese king that Christians would swear loyalty to the king in Christian rites. In October 1774, King Taksin held a public debate, inviting the Buddhist monks, Christian priests and Islamic imams to discuss whether killing an animal was a sin. Buddhist monks said that killing animals had always been sinful, while the Christian priests and Muslim imams asserted that killing animal was not sinful because god had created animals for the benefits of humankind. Taksin was extremely displeased with Christian and Islamic notion that killing animal was not sinful so he enacted a law in 1774 forbidding the native Siamese, Mon, Northern Thai and Lao people from converting to Christianity or Islam. This law was similar to the 1731 law banning Christian evangelism but in this 1774 law Islam was included and if any Christian priests or Muslim imams instigated the native people to partake in their religious rituals, such Christian priests and Muslim imams could be subjected to death penalty.

In September 1775, Bishop Le Bon had three Siamese Christian officials swear oath to the king in Christian rite, in which the three officials swore in Siamese language in front of a Christian altar. King Taksin then had the three defiant Christian officials arrested and whipped with rattan canes until these three Christian surrendered to undergo traditional ceremonies of drinking lustral water. The three French priests; Bishop Le Bon, Father Coudé and Father Garnault, were also arrested and flogged with rattan canes. They were imprisoned in Siamese Charit Nakhonban tradition including being chained in the neck, hands and feet bound to a cangue. In late 1775, the Burmese invaded Siam again so King Taksin had to march armies to war in Northern Siam, leaving the three French priests in Thonburi prison. Only when King Taksin returned from the war that Le Bon, Coudé and Garnault were released in August 1776, after nearly one year of imprisonment. After release, Le Bon was coincidentally made the new Apostolic vicar of Siam. The French Catholic priests subsequently offended King Taksin on many occasions as they refused to let Christians to partake in royal ceremonies. Eventually, in November 1779, King Taksin ran out of his patience and expelled all the three French priests; Bishop Le Bon, Father Coudé and Father Garnault from Siam. Bishop Le Bon went to Goa, where he died in 1780, while Coudé and Garnault went to Pondicherry. Coudé was appointed as the new Apostolic vicar to succeed Le Bon.

With expulsion of the three French priests from Siam by King Taksin in 1779, there was not a single Christian priest remaining in Siam. Coudé and Garnault settled in Kedah in 1780, where they found a friendlier and more-promising environment as they established Catholic mission in Kedah and Penang. Taksin was overthrown in 1782 and King Rama I ascended the Siamese throne, founding the Chakri dynasty. The new king Rama I or King Phuttha Yotfa Chulalok saw that there were no Christian priests in Siam to perform religious services for the Mestizo Catholics so the Siamese had his trade minister Chaophraya Phrakhlang Hon write to the Portuguese at Macau, requesting for a Catholic priest. Macau sent a Dominican priest Francisco das Chagas Ribeiro to Bangkok. When King Rama knew that Bishop Coudé was in Junkceylon (Phuket), the king also invited Coudé to Bangkok. The Portuguese Mestizos in Siam, however, had been resenting the French priests since the Ayutthaya period, preferring the Portuguese priest Francisco. Bishop Coudé arrived in Bangkok 1784 and had audience with the king. King Rama I ruled that Siamese Christian officials were not required to partake in the water-drinking ceremony and French priests were permitted to return to Siam. Coudé told the Portuguese priest Francisco that the Pope had granted Siam, in 1669, to be under exclusive authority of MEP so Francisco was obliged to return to Macau. This enraged the Mestizos, who refused to attend any religious services conducted by Bishop Coudé. Facing strong resistance, Coudé decided to leave Bangkok to return to Kedah but died from illness at Takuathung on his journey in 1785.

With the death of Coudé, Garnault was appointed as the new Apostolic vicar of Siam. However, Garnault stayed in Kedah. Garnault visited Bangkok in 1796, where he published the Christian catechism Khamson Christang ("Christian teaching") in Siamese language but using Latin alphabet as the ban on using Siamese alphabet in Christian teachings had still been in place. As the missionaries were forbidden to work on native Siamese, Mon and Lao people, they could only work on the Cambodians, Chinese and the Vietnamese, who were not included in the law, in Siam. Bishop Garnault the Apostolic vicar of Siam spent most of his tenure in Kedah, while also administrating Catholic communities in Bangkok, Chanthaburi, Kedah, Penang, Phuket and Mergui. In the early nineteenth century, the Catholic mission in Siam expanded exponentially with papal briefs adding Cambodia, Lower Burma and all the Malay Peninsula down to Singapore to the authority of the Apostolic vicariate of Siam.

=== Role of Bishop Pallegoix ===
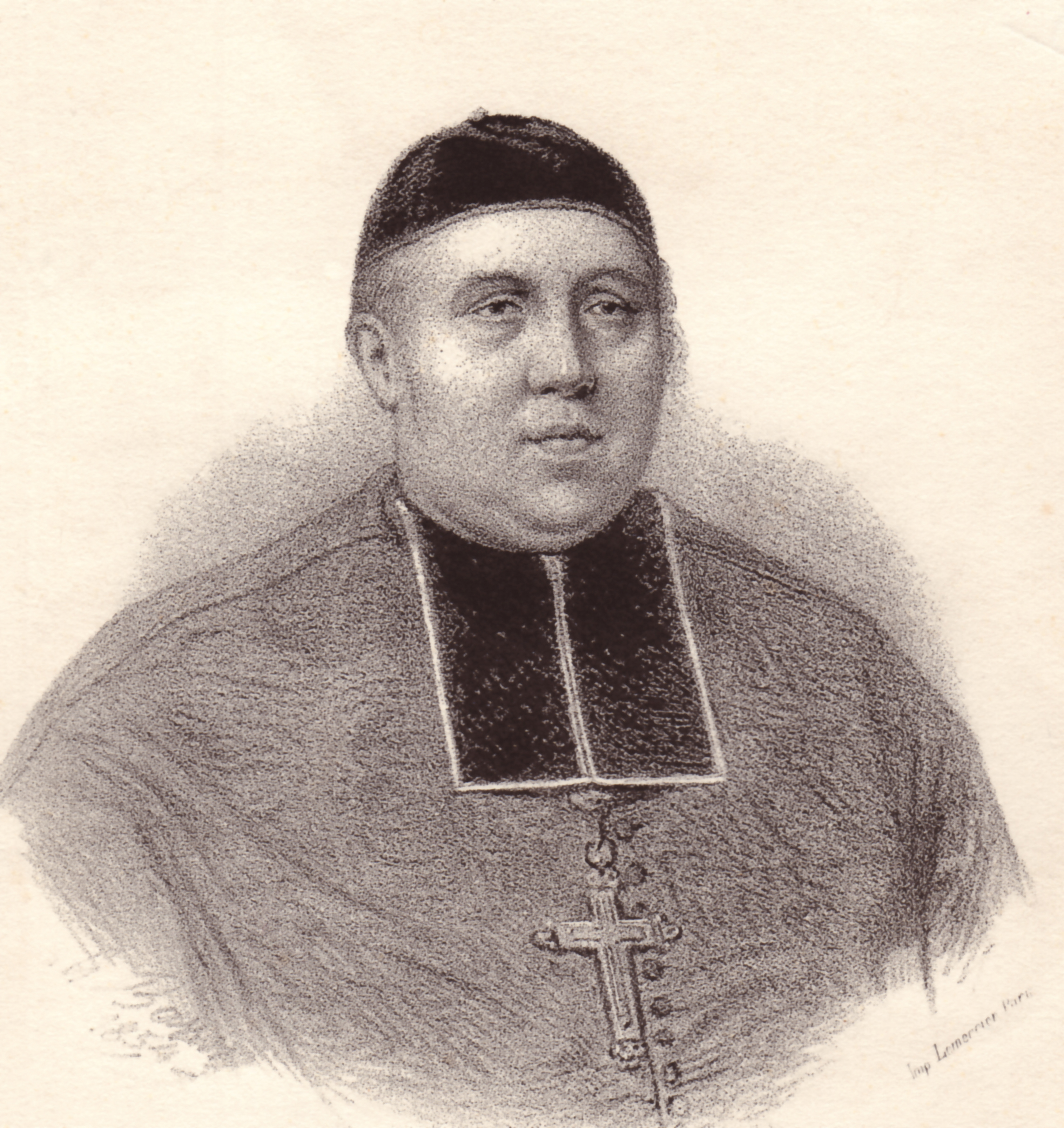
Jean-Baptiste Pallegoix, Bishop of Mallus, was appointed as the first Apostolic Vicar of Eastern Siam in 1841.

Jean-Baptiste Pallegoix was born in 1805 in Combertault, Côte-d'Or, joining MEP at the age of twenty-two and was ordained as an MEP priest next year in 1828. Pallegoix left France in 1828 for Siam, reaching Bangkok in 1830 at the age of twenty-five, where he learned the Siamese language. Pallegoix was assigned by Esprit-Marie-Joseph Florens the Apostolic Vicar of Siam to restore the Catholic community at Ayutthaya. At Ayutthaya, in 1831, Pallegoix restored the Seminary of Saint Joseph destroyed by the Burmese in 1767 as Saint Joseph Church. Pallegoix translated the Christian catechism Documenta rectæ rationis, originally composed by an MEP priest Georges Alary before 1803, into Thai language as Puxa-Vixachana (Thai: ปุจฉา-วิสัชนา, from Pali pucchā "question" and vissajjanā "answer") published in Latin script in 1834. This Christian catechism again criticized Buddhism in favor of Christianity, drawing ires from the Siamese elites. King Rama III did not take serious actions about this work but Pallegoix was warned not to publish to offend Buddhism.

In 1835, Pallegoix renovated the Santa Cruz Church of Kudichin previously built in 1773. Pallegoix also oversaw construction of the Immaculate Conception Church of Samsen to accommodate Cambodian and Vietnamese Catholics in 1838. In 1835, Jean-Paul Courvezy the Apostolic Vicar of Siam left Bangkok to establish the mission at Singapore so Courvezy appointed Pallegoix as his coadjutor, entrusting Pallegoix to administer the mission in Siam. In September 1841, Pope Gregory XVI issued the papal brief Universi Dominici separating the Apostolic vicariate of Siam into Apostolic vicariate of Western Siam centered on Singapore under Courvezy and Apostolic vicariate of Eastern Siam centered on Bangkok belonging to Pallegoix. Bishop Pallegoix thus became the first Apostolic Vicar of Eastern Siam after the division, at the age of thirty-six. Upon the appointment of Pallegoix to the vicariate, there were 4,300 Catholics in Siam;

- 1,700 Vietnamese Catholics assigned to the Saint Francis Xavier Church of Samsen
- 700 Cambodian–Portuguese Mestizo Catholics assigned to the Immaculate Conception Church of Samsen
- 500 Siamese–Portuguese Mestizo Catholics assigned to the Santa Cruz Church of Kudichin
- 500 Siamese–Portuguese Mestizo Catholics assigned to Holy Rosary Church
- 100 Siamese Catholics at Saint Joseph Church in Ayutthaya
- 800 Siamese–Vietnamese Catholics in Chanthaburi

Bishop Pallegoix cultivated friendship with Prince Mongkut the younger half-brother of the reigning king Rama III. In 1849, a cholera epidemic struck at Bangkok, where 40,000 people died from the disease. The Siamese king Rama III or King Nangklao, his effort to lessen the Buddhist karma, ordered the general Buddhist merit-making by releasing and feeding domesticated animals. Out of the nine French priests in Bangkok, only Pallegoix agreed to comply with the king's order. Other French priests saw that releasing animals to make Buddhist merits was a superstition and discouraged Christians from following the royal order. King Rama was enraged, ordering destruction of Catholic churches and expulsion of French Catholic priests from Siam. Bishop Pallegoix saved the situation by assigning Phra Wisetsongkhram Pascoal Ribeiro de Albergaria, a Siamese Catholic official of Cambodian–Portuguese Mestizo descent, to bring chicken, geese and goats from the churches into the royal palace for the king to release. King Rama was then satisfied and rescinded his order to destroy the churches. The eight French priests, however, chose to leave Siam rather than to comply with the king's order. Those eight French priests were Pierre Clémenceau, Jean-Baptiste Grandjean, Jean Claudet, Aimé Dupond, Séverin Daniel, Louis Larnaudie, Nicolas Lequeux and Pierre Gibarta, who scattered to Singapore, Penang and Hong Kong.

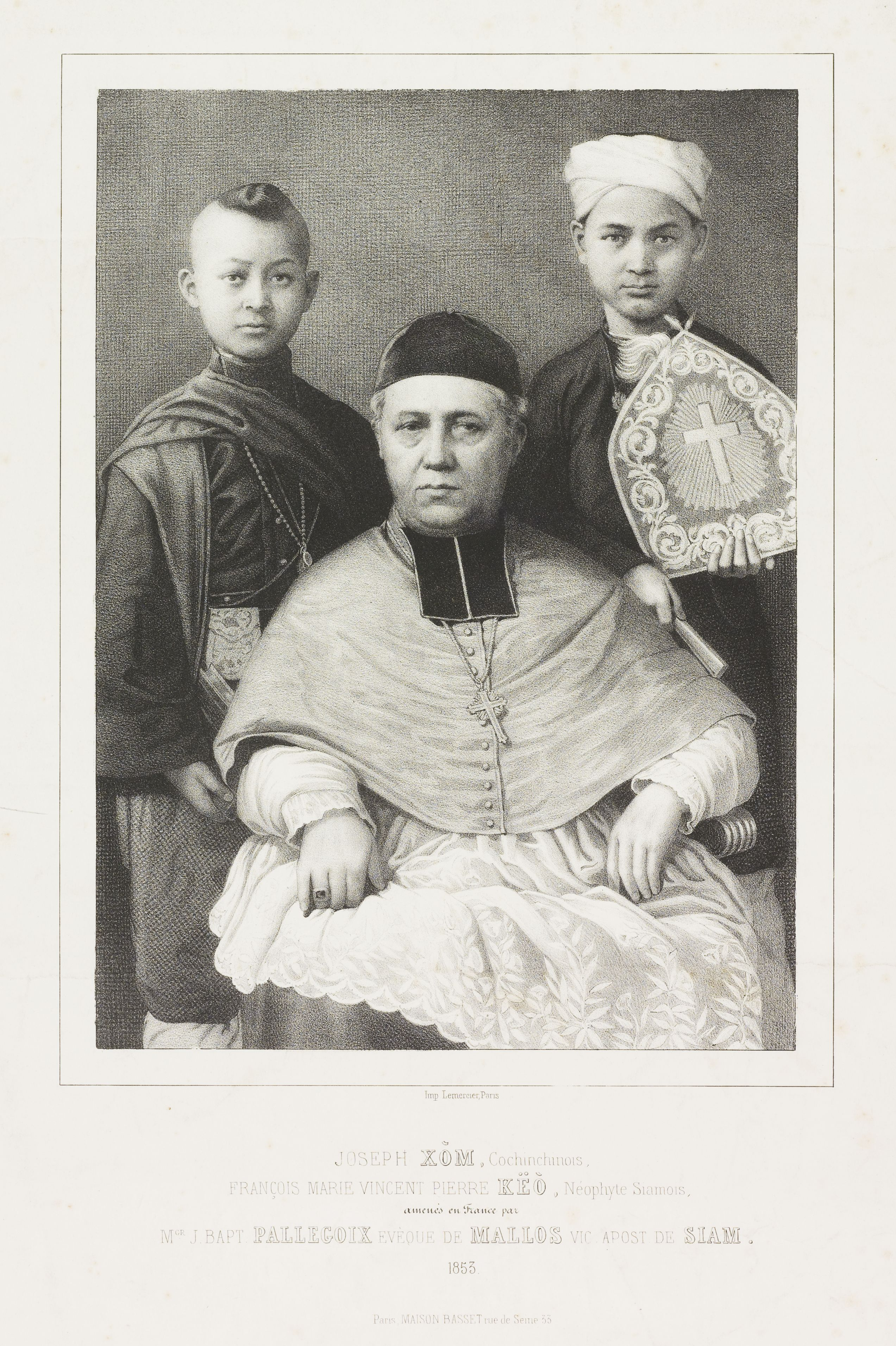
Bishop Jean-Baptiste Pallegoix with Siamese boy named Kaew (left) and Vietnamese boy named Xom (right) during his visit to Paris in 1852.

With departure of the eight French priests, there were only two Catholic priests remaining in Siam, with Pallegoix in Bangkok and Ranfaing in Chanthaburi. As King Mongkut ascended the throne in 1851, the new king personally wrote to the eight expelled missionaries, urging them to return to Siam and promising not to impose Siamese beliefs on the Christians in the future. Seven priests returned to Bangkok, with exception of Father Grandjean, who returned to France. Bishop Pallegoix brought the seven returning French priests to have an audience with King Mongkut in February 1852. Also in 1852, Pallegoix went to France to bring royal letters from the Siamese king Mongkut to the French Emperor and the Pope, reaching Paris in 1853. Bishop Pallegoix presented the royal letter from King Mongkut, along with Dictionarium Linguæ Thai, which was a four-way Thai, Latin, French and English dictionary and his own work Description of Kingdom of Thai or Siam (French: Description du Royaume Thai ou Siam) to Emperor Napoleon III, introducing the French Emperor to the Kingdom of Siam. In 1854, Pallegoix had an audience with Pope Pius IX at Rome, presenting a letter from the Siamese king Mongkut to the Pope. Pope Pius IX issued papal briefs Pergrata nobis (1852) and Summa quidem (1861) to express gratitude for King Mongkut for his tolerance on the Catholics.

== Bowring Treaty ==
=== Traditional Siamese commercial and legal systems ===
Siamese monarchs had been monopolizing Siamese trade with Western nations since the Ayutthaya period. Any incoming Western merchants or Western ships who came to trade in Siam were obliged to trade with Phra Khlang Sinkha or Royal Warehouse who, on behalf of the Siamese king, monopolized the Western trade, haggle the price and collect duties. Westerners who brought merchandises to sell in Siam were subjected to the three duties; import duty (of around eight percent in the early nineteenth century), measurement duty (any Western ships docking in Siam were levied of this measurement duty, which was collected according to the width of the ship itself) and export duty. For export, Westerners could purchase certain Siamese valuable goods only from the Phra Khlang Sinkha, who monopolized the export of such high-value articles. By the early nineteenth century, these exported items monopolized by the Royal Warehouse included sappanwood, tin, pepper, bird's nest, cardamom, ivory and cambodge. These duties imposed on Western traders had been important source of revenue for Siam. Westerners, however, saw this traditional Siamese custom levy as restrictive, in which Western traders were disadvantageous in their haggle with Phra Khlang Sinkha, who had been empowered with such monopoly and the Westerners were also deprived of their due trade benefits in Siam.

Pre-modern Siamese law and judiciary system were based on the Classical Indic legal system pertaining to Indian statecraft treatises such as Arthashastra and the Manusmṛti. In the Three Seals Law composed in 1805, technically the continuation of the Ayutthayan law, punishments for criminal offences included decapitation, amputation of limbs, imprisonment, whipping with rattan canes, etc. In Siamese legal ideology, crime was not only an offence to individuals but also an offence to society as a whole. Siamese legal punishments sought to create fear within society to prevent others from emulating the crime. During legal trials, when a suspected criminal did not confess, judiciary tortures known as Charit Nakhonban (Thai: จารีตนครบาล, Nakhonban creed) were to apply, including whipping with rattan canes, chaining in cangues, being tied up and thrown into water, being exposed to the heat of daylight, being slapped in the mouth. Presumption of guilt, in which the defendants were presumed guilty until proven innocent, was in contrast to presumption of innocence in Western jurisprudence. Siamese judiciary tortures were in accordance with Indic Arthashastra, which allowed tortures on criminals who did not confess. In cases when the truth could not be found, defendants would sometimes be made to walk through fire or dive into water to prove their innocence. This was in accordance to the trial by ordeal of Manusmṛti, borrowing supernatural forces to help judge the case. Westerners were generally horrified by this Indo–Siamese judicial system, which they considered barbaric, not conforming to Western ideology and sought to dissociate themselves from such Siamese legal system.

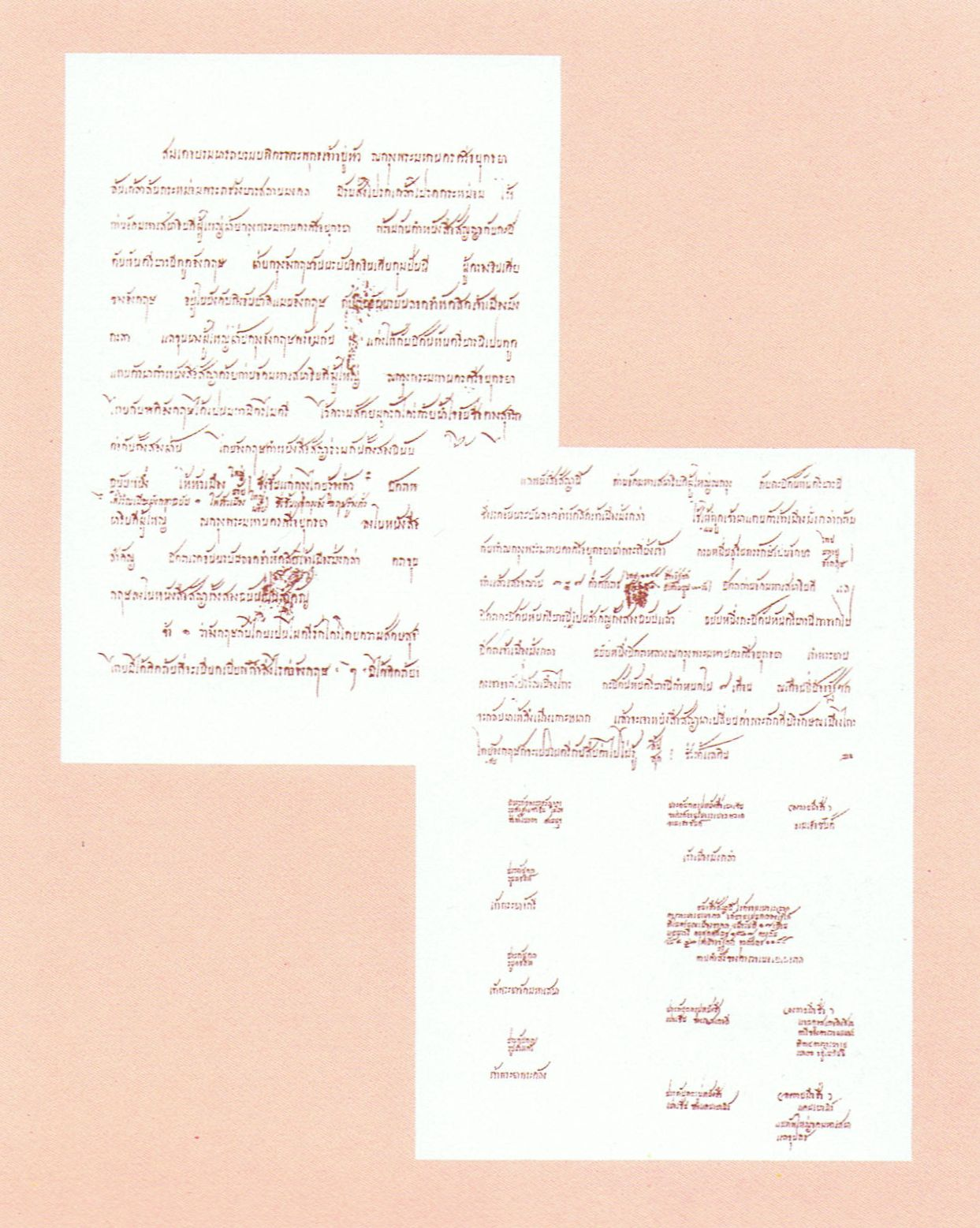
Anglo–Siamese Burney Treaty of 1826 ended Siamese royal monopoly on Western trades as British merchants were allowed to trade freely and privately in Siam. However, traditional Siamese import duties remained, only to be reduced by Bowring Treaty of 1855.

Impactful Siamese relations with Westerners in the nineteenth century began with the arrival of John Crawfurd, a British envoy from the Indian Government, in Siam in 1822. The British were the first to attempt to dismantle traditional Siamese royal monopoly on Western trades. Crawfurd proposed Siam for 'free trade' and a low-rate duty which was to be collected only once but, due to many shortcomings, Siam did not comply to Crawfurd's proposals. Four years later, in 1826, another British representative Henry Burney arrived in Siam to conclude the Burney Treaty of April 1826, in which British merchants were allowed to trade freely and privately with the Siamese as monopoly of the Royal Warehouse was abolished. However, most of the Siamese custom duties remained intact and British people in Siam were still subjected to traditional Siamese legal system. Siam concluded a similar treaty with the United States in the Roberts Treaty of 1833, in which American merchants were accorded similar rights to the British including exemption from the Siamese royal monopoly.

Siam's relinquish of trade monopoly resulted in a great revenue loss. In the 1840s, King Rama III or King Nangklao of Siam compensated the revenue loss by implementing the Chinese tax farmer system, in which Chinese merchants acting as tax farmers would compete in auction for a tax quota from Siamese government. British and American merchants, however, found this tax farmer system as reimposition of Siamese monopoly as Western merchants were obliged to pay duties to these Chinese tax farmers instead of Royal Warehouse. In the aftermath of the First Opium War, the British gained power and influence in the Far East and the Sino–British Treaty of Nanking (1842) served as the model for subsequent unequal treaties that Britain was going to conclude with other Asian nations, including the Anglo–Siamese Bowring Treaty. The terms of these unequal treaties included opening of ports for Western merchants to trade, establishment of consular authority, extraterritorial jurisdiction and stipulation of fixed low-rate duties. In 1850, Britain sent James Brooke and the United States sent Joseph Balestier to negotiate for new treaties with Siam. Balestier proposed reduction or abolishment of the measurement duty, while Brooke demanded that Siam allowed the British to establish a consulate in Siam, establishing British extraterritorial jurisdiction. However, the Siamese king Nangklao was ill and the Phrakhlang or trade minister Dit Bunnag did not agree to these British–American proposals in general anti-Western sentiments of the Siamese court. Both Brooke and Balestier left Siam incensed and empty-handed, with Brooke threatening to apply gunboat diplomacy on Siam.

=== Bowring's mission to Siam ===
King Rama III or King Nangklao died in 1851, succeeded by his younger half-brother Mongkut, who had been a Theravadin Buddhist monk for 27 years, as the new King of Siam. Before his ascension to the throne, Mongkut, as a Buddhist monk, learned about Western science and philosophy. Mongkut learnt English language from American Presbyterian missionary Jesse Caswell and learnt Latin from French Catholic missionary Jean-Baptiste Pallegoix. King Mongkut made his own younger brother Pinklao as Vice-king of the Front Palace or Second King of Siam. Pinklao had been a strong admirer of Anglo–American culture and a fluent English speaker. Pinklao had been the most prominent figure of Westernization in the preceding reign of King Nangklao. As Mongkut was politically supported by the Bunnag family in his ascension to the throne, Mongkut appointed the Bunnags to high ministerial positions;

- Chaophraya Phrakhlang Dit Bunnag, who had been the Phrakhlang or Minister of Trade and Foreign Affairs since 1821, was made Somdet Chaophraya Borom Maha Prayurawong (Thai: สมเด็จเจ้าพระยาบรมมหาประยูรวงศ์) the king's regent kingdom-wide, colloquially called Somdet Chaophraya Ongyai (Thai: สมเด็จเจ้าพระยาองค์ใหญ่) or the 'Elder Somdet Chaophraya'. Somdet Chaophraya was the highest rank a noble could attain with honor equal to that of a prince.
- Phraya Siphiphat That Bunnag (younger brother of Dit Bunnag), who had been the director of Phra Khlang Sinkha or Royal Warehouse, was made Somdet Chaophraya Borom Maha Phichaiyat (Thai: สมเด็จเจ้าพระยาบรมมหาพิไชยญาติ) the king's regent in Bangkok, colloquially called Somdet Chaophraya Ongnoi (Thai: สมเด็จเจ้าพระยาองค์น้อย) or the 'Younger Somdet Chaophraya'.
- Chuang Bunnag, eldest son of Dit Bunnag, was made Chaophraya Si Suriyawong (Thai: เจ้าพระยาศรีสุริยวงศ์) the Samuha Kalahom or Prime Minister of Southern Siam. Chuang Bunnag had also learnt English language.
- Kham Bunnag, other son of Dit Bunnag, was made Chaophraya Rawiwong (Thai: เจ้าพระยารวิวงศ์มหาโกษาธิบดี) the Phrakhlang or Minister of Trade and Foreign Affairs. His title was later changed to Chaophraya Thiphakornwong.

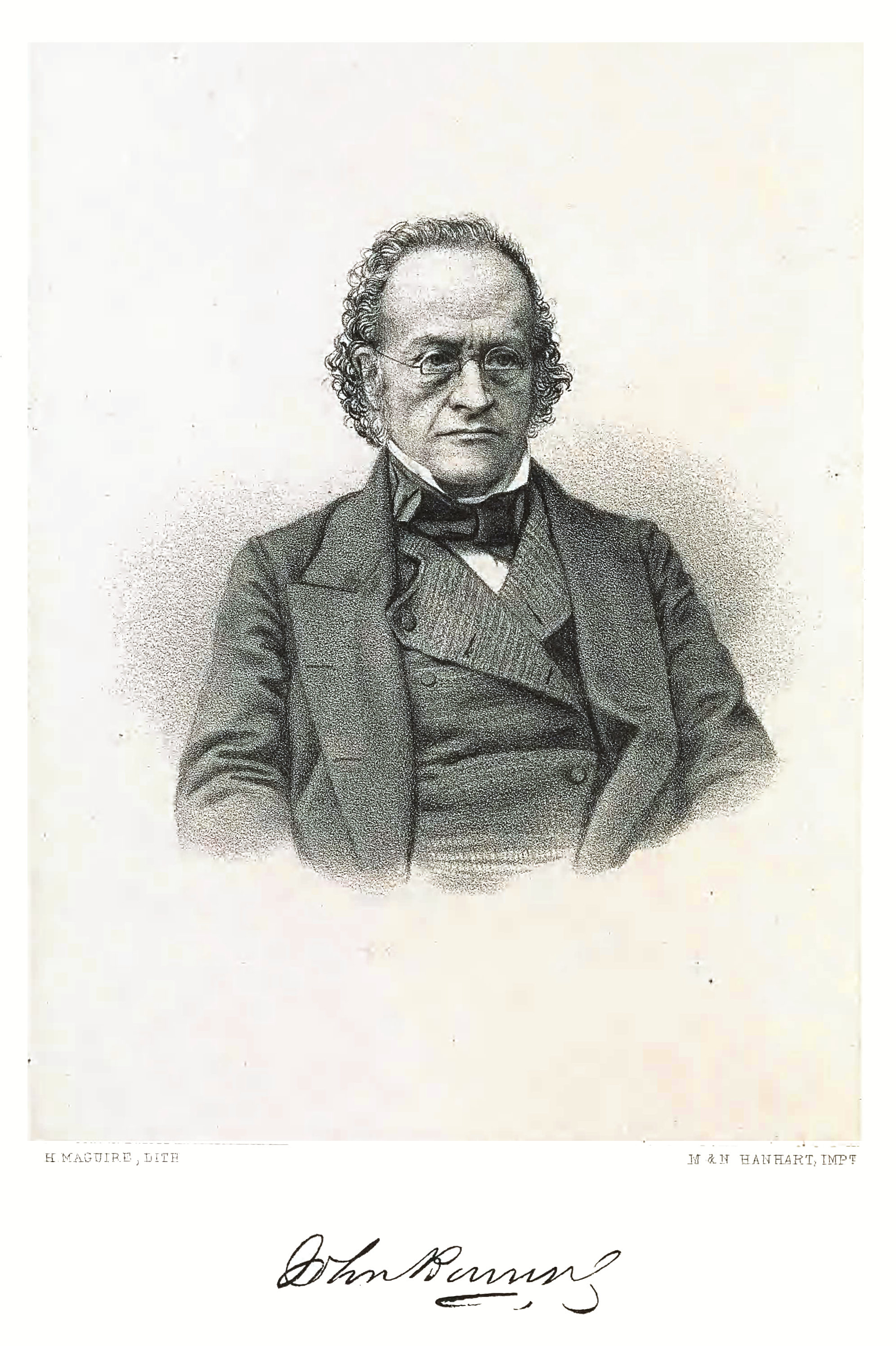
Sir John Bowring the Governor of Hong Kong was appointed as British plenipotentiary to conclude the eponymous Bowring Treaty with Siam in April 1855.

With the ascension of King Mongkut in 1851, the Siamese government had more pro-Western sentiments. In 1854, George Villiers, 4th Earl of Clarendon, the British Foreign Secretary, appointed Sir John Bowring the Governor of Hong Kong as plenipotentiary to negotiate for a new treaties with Asian polities including Japan, Siam and Vietnam. Bowring had earlier been in personal correspondences with King Mongkut through written letters. Bowring, unlike Crawfurd or Burney, was the representative of British royal government at London rather than of British East India Company. Bowring arrived in Bangkok in April 1855 in steam sloop HMS Rattler with Harry Parkes the British Consul at Amoy. The Siamese government received the British diplomatic mission with salute cannons. This was the first time that Siam received Western envoys with Western protocol. King Mongkut appointed five Siamese plenipotentiaries to discuss the new treaty with Britain;

- Prince Wongsathirat Sanit, half younger-brother of King Mongkut
- Somdet Chaophraya Prayurawong Dit Bunnag the king's regent kingdom-wide
- Somdet Chaophraya Phichaiyat That Bunnag the king's regent in the royal capital of Bangkok
- Chaophraya Si Suriyawong Chuang Bunnag the Samuha Kalahom or Prime Minister of Southern Siam
- Chaophraya Rawiwong Kham Bunnag the Phrakhlang or Minister of Trade and Foreign Affairs

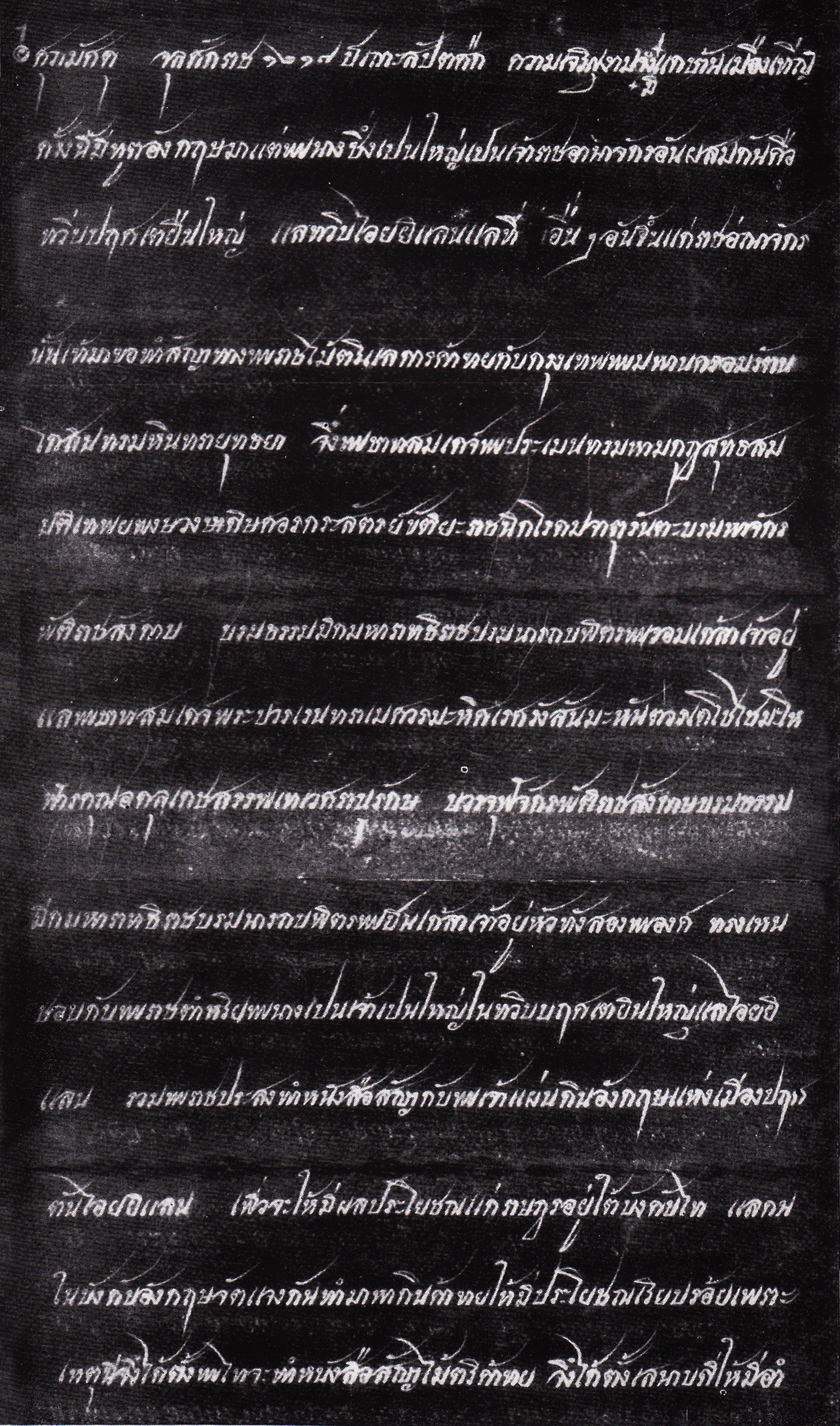
Bowring Treaty of April 1855, concluded between Siam and Britain, marked the beginning of Siam's modern international relations and became the prototype of unequal treaties that Siam would conclude with other Western nations.

Bowring's and Harry Parkes' proposals were the right of residence and land ownership of British subjects in Siam, dissolution of traditional Siamese import and measurement duties into one single duty that would be collected only once at the low rate of three percent and establishment of British consulate to exercise jurisdiction over British subjects in Siam. Siamese negotiators countered that the British would be allowed to reside and own lands only within the area of twenty-hour riparian boat journey from Bangkok but they should not be nearer than 200 sen (six kilometers) from Bangkok. The Siamese also protested that allowing the British to establish consulate would compromise Siam's sovereignty. The Somdet Chaophrayas, the Bunnags of older generation, were against British proposals, while Chuang Bunnag of the younger generation supported Siam's compliance to British terms. During the negotiations, Dit Bunnag became ill, leaving his younger brother That Bunnag as the main opponent of Bowring. Upon knowing that Siam would not concede, Bowring threatened that he would immediately leave Siam with the Rattler to return to discuss with his colleagues in China what to do to the Siamese kingdom. Facing Bowring's threats, the older Bunnags gave in as Chuang Bunnag prevailed over his father and his uncle.

=== Bowring Treaty terms ===
Treaty of Friendship and Commerce between Great Britain and Siam, known colloquially in Thai historiography as the Bowring Treaty, was signed on 18 April 1855. According to Bowring, Chuang Bunnag, whom he called Kalahom, was instrumental in convincing other Siamese plenipotentiaries, his father and his uncle, to concede to the British proposals. Bowring Treaty terms included:

- Establishment of British consular authority in Siam: British subjects in Siam came under jurisdiction of the British Consul in Bangkok (The interests of all British subjects coming to Siam shall be placed under the regulation and control of a Consul.). In cases of legal disputes between British and Siamese subjects in Siam would be 'jointly' overseen by both the British Consul and the Siamese authority (Any disputes arising between Siamese and British subjects shall be heard and determined by the Consul, in conjunction with the proper Siamese officers.).
- Extraterritoriality: In legal cases in Siam, nationality of the defendant determined what authority would judge the case. If the defendant was a British subject, the case would be judged by the British Consul in accordance with British law. If the defendant was a Siamese subject, the case would be handled by the traditional Siamese legal and judicial system (Criminal offences will be punished, in the case of English offenders by the Consul, according to English laws, and in the case of Siamese offenders, by their own laws, through the Siamese authorities.)
- Commerce: Measurement duty, which was levied by the measurement of the width of the merchant ship, was abolished (The measurement duty hitherto paid by British vessels trading to Bangkok, under the treaty of 1826, shall be abolished.) and the overall import duties were streamlined into a single import duty of low rate of three percent, which could be paid in money or paid with the merchandise itself (On all articles of import the duties shall be three percent, payable at the option of the importer, either in kind or money.) For the export duty, the duty rates of each commodity were listed in an agreement attached to the treaty.
- Travel and Land Ownership: Siam established two layers of permissible zone of travel and land ownership of British subjects in Siam;
  - Inner Layer: The area of 200 sen (four miles) around Bangkok, which was four British miles, measuring from the Bangkok city walls. the British were allowed to reside but not allowed to own lands unless they had been residing in Siam for ten years or were specifically allowed by the Siamese government (cannot purchase lands within a circuit of 200 Sen (not more than four miles English) from the city walls, until they shall have lived in Siam for ten years, or shall obtain special authority from the Siamese Government.).
  - Middle Layer: The area from 200 sen around Bangkok to the distance of the journey of twenty-four hours by boat passage from Bangkok. The British were allowed to travel and own lands (British residents in Siam may at any time buy or rent houses, lands, or plantations, situated anywhere within a distance of twenty-four hours journey from the city of Bangkok, to be computed by the rate at which boats of the country can travel.).
  - Outer Layer: The area outside of the twenty-four hour journey from Bangkok, of which the British were not permitted to travel nor reside nor own lands.

=== Harry Parkes' Supplementary Agreement ===
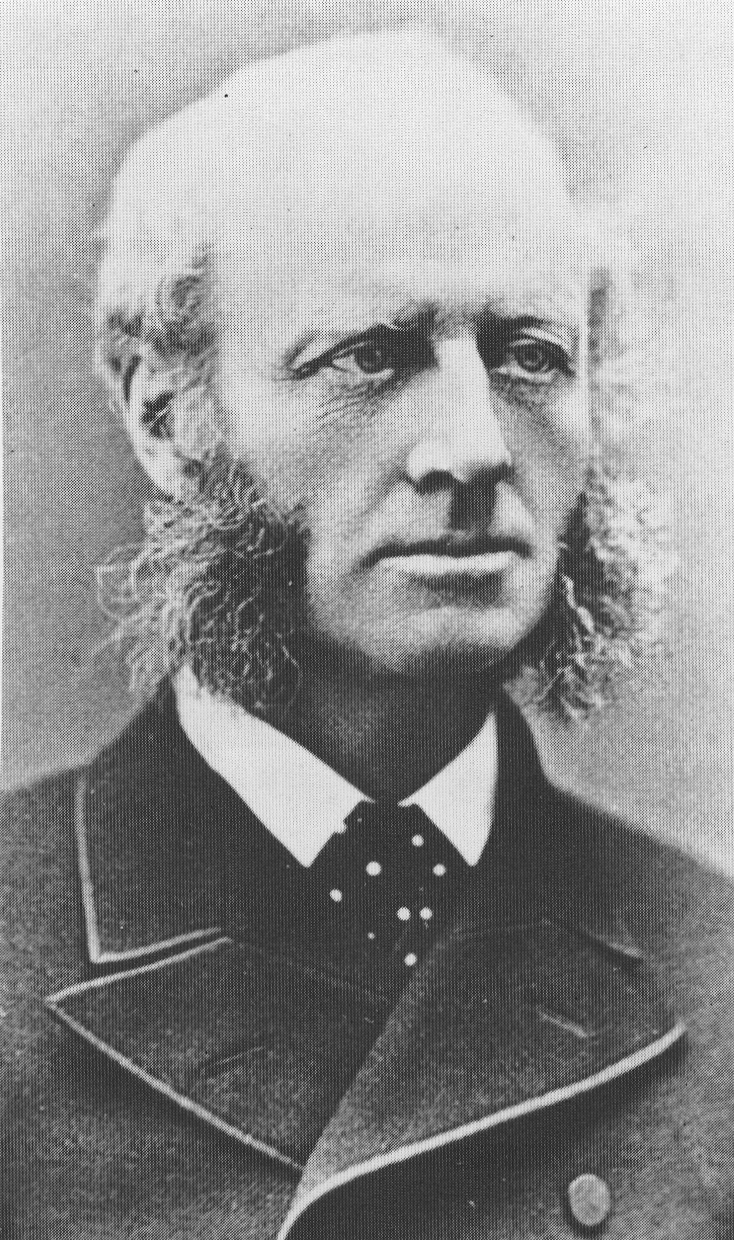
Harry Parkes the British Consul at Amoy joined Sir John Bowring in the British mission to conclude the Bowring Treaty with Siam in 1855, assigned to bring the treaty to London and then tasked with returning to Siam in 1856 to conclude a supplementary agreement to clarify vagueness of Bowring Treaty.

After the signing of the Bowring Treaty in April 1855, Sir John Bowring assigned Harry Parkes to bring the treaty to London for ratification, while Bowring himself returned to Hong Kong. Somdet Chaophraya Prayurawong Dit Bunnag or the Elder Somdet Chaophraya died from illness eight days after the signing of Bowring Treaty. During Harry Parkes' journey to Britain, Franklin Pierce the president of the United States appointed Townsend Harris as Consul General to Tokugawa Japan in August 1855. As Harris himself had been an American merchant in China, Harris was aware of Bowring's mission to Siam so Harris proposed to the American president that the United States should also send a diplomatic mission to conclude a new treaty with Siam. President Franklin Pierce then commissioned Townsend Harris in September 1855, on his journey to Japan, to make a detour to Siam to conclude a new American–Siamese treaty.

At London, the Queen's Advocate and Law Officers of the Crown pointed out vagueness of the Bowring Treaty;

- It was not specified what articles of the 1826 Burney Treaty were abrogated and superseded by this 1855 Bowring Treaty and what articles were to remain in effect.
- In the Bowring Treaty, the British Consul was to 'jointly' govern the British subjects in Siam with the Siamese government. However, the Queen's Advocate preferred the British subjects in Siam to be in exclusive authority of British Consul without Siamese interference.
- The 200 sen and twenty-four-hour-journey limits of permissible residence of the British in Siam were vague and not properly demarcated.

The British government then assigned Harry Parkes to bring suggestions from the Queen's Advocate to the Siamese government in Bangkok to clarify the vagueness and obscurities. Parkes was also assigned a royal letter from Queen Victoria to be delivered to the Siamese king. Harry Parkes reached Penang in February 1856, where he met Townsend Harris the American plenipotentiary. Parkes and Harris discussed their proposals to Siam and Parkes gave a copy of the Bowring Treaty to Harris. Harry Parkes arrived in Bangkok first in March 1856 in frigate HMS Auckland. The Siamese were delighted that Parkes brought a royal letter from the British monarch and considered Parkes to be a proper royal envoy. Parkes was received with even more pomp ceremonies than that of Bowring, with King Mongkut granting a grand audience to Parkes in Dusit Maha Prasat Throne Hall.

During Parkes' negotiation with Siamese government, Townsend Harris the American envoy arrived in Bangkok in April 1856 in the screw frigate USS San Jacinto. Supplementary Agreement of Harry Parkes was concluded on 13 May 1856, in which it was clearly stated that what terms of the 1826 Burney Treaty were terminated and what terms were continued, the British imposed exclusive jurisdiction of the British Consul on British subjects in Siam without intervention of Siamese government (The Consul shall not interfere in any matters referring solely to Siamese, neither will the Siamese Authorities interfere in questions which only concern the subjects of her Britannic Majesty.) and the limits of 200 sen and twenty-four-hour-journey distance were demarcated.

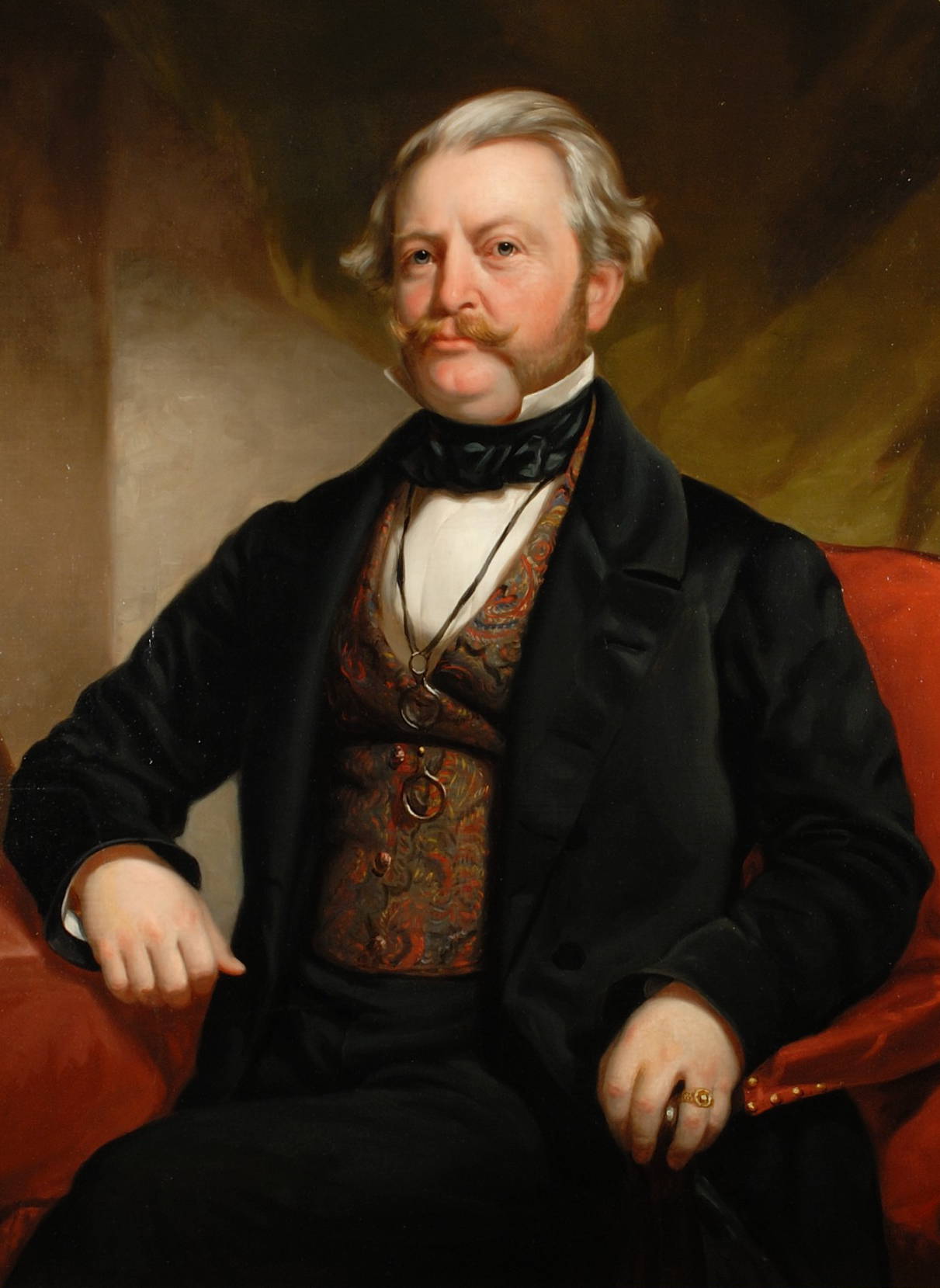
Townsend Harris was appointed by President Franklin Pierce as the Consul General to Japan in 1855. Harris was also assigned to conclude the American–Siamese Treaty of Amity and Commerce in 1856.

With the conclusion of Parkes' agreement, Harry Parkes left Siam and King Mongkut appointed five plenipotentiaries to discuss the new American–Siamese treaty with Harris. They were Prince Wongsathirat Sanit, Somdet Chaophraya Phichaiyat That Bunnag, Chaophraya Si Suriyawong Chuang Bunnag, Chaophraya Rawiwong Kham Bunnag and Chaophraya Yommarat Nuch. American–Siamese Treaty of Amity and Commerce was signed on 29 May 1856, in which the United States was granted similar Siamese concessions to Britain including establishing an American consulate in Bangkok, American extraterritorial jurisdiction in Siam, abolition of measurement duty, stipulation of the low three-percent import duty for American merchants and the two-layer areas where the Americans could travel, reside and own lands. After the conclusion of this American–Siamese Harris Treaty, Townsend Harris continued his journey to Japan to conclude the American–Japanese Harris Treaty of 1858.

== Montigny's mission to Siam ==
=== Preparation ===
By the mid-nineteenth century, the British Empire had established political and commercial influence over the Far East. France, in contrast, had not been engaging in the affairs of the Far East, maintaining only the colony of French India based on Pondicherry. Siam had concluded the Burney Treaty (1826) with Great Britain and the Roberts Treaty (1833) with the United States. During the July Monarchy, France established a consulate in Singapore in 1839 as the first step of French expansion in the Far East, with Eugène Chaigneau as the first French Consul in Singapore. Meanwhile, the British were gaining power and influence over Qing China in the aftermath of the First Opium War, after which the Treaty of Nanking (1842) stipulated several concessions from China. Chaigneau arrived in Singapore in 1840. Also in 1840, during the time of British prevail over China in the Opium War, the Siamese royal court of King Rama III contacted Chaigneau the French Consul at Singapore, requesting for a Franco–Siamese commercial treaty in the same manner that Siam had earlier concluded with Britain and the United States. Chaigneau, however, saw Siamese intention as political rather than commercial as Siam sought alliance with France to counter the British influences. French interests in the region concerned China more than any other Asian polities. The French were still not interested in a new treaty with Siam. In 1844, France concluded the Treaty of Whampoa (黃埔條約) with China, in which the treaty terms were similar to the Sino–British Treaty of Nanking and the upcoming Franco–Siamese Treaty, including opening of ports, establishment of French consular and extraterritorial jurisdiction in China, stipulation of a fixed import duty and freedom of Christian missionary activities.

Charles de Montigny was appointed as the first French Consul to Shanghai in 1847. Montigny arrived in Shanghai and established the French Concession in Shanghai in 1849. The February Revolution of 1848 overthrew the July Monarchy of King Louis-Phillippe of the Orléans dynasty, establishing the French Second Republic, during which Louis-Napoléon Bonaparte, nephew of Emperor Napoleon of the First French Empire, was elected as the President of France. When King Mongkut of Siam ascended the throne in 1851, it became internationally known that the new Siamese king was on more amicable terms with Westerners than his predecessors so Western nations, including Britain, France and the United States, contemplated negotiating for new treaties with Siam. France sent Frédéric Gauthier as the new French Consul in Singapore. In July 1852, the French government assigned Rear Admiral Laguerre (Contre-Amiral Laguerre) the commander of French naval squadron in Réunion as the French plenipotentiary to go to Bangkok to conclude a new treaty with Siam. Also in 1852, Louis-Napoléon the President of France proclaimed himself Napoleon III the Emperor of the French, establishing the Second French Empire. Emperor Napoleon III reaffirmed Rear Admiral Laguerre as the French imperial plenipotentiary to Siam. However, the ongoing Crimean War prevented France from sending any ships to bring the French diplomatic mission to Siam. In 1853, Jean-Baptiste Pallegoix, the Apostolic Vicar of Eastern Siam in Bangkok, also a close friend of Siamese king Mongkut, arrived in Paris to present the royal letter from King Mongkut, Dictionarium Linguæ Thai, a Thai-Latin-French-English dictionary and his own work Description of Kingdom of Thai or Siam (French: Description du Royaume Thai ou Siam) to Emperor Napoleon and Empress Eugénie, introducing the Kingdom of Siam to the French Emperor.

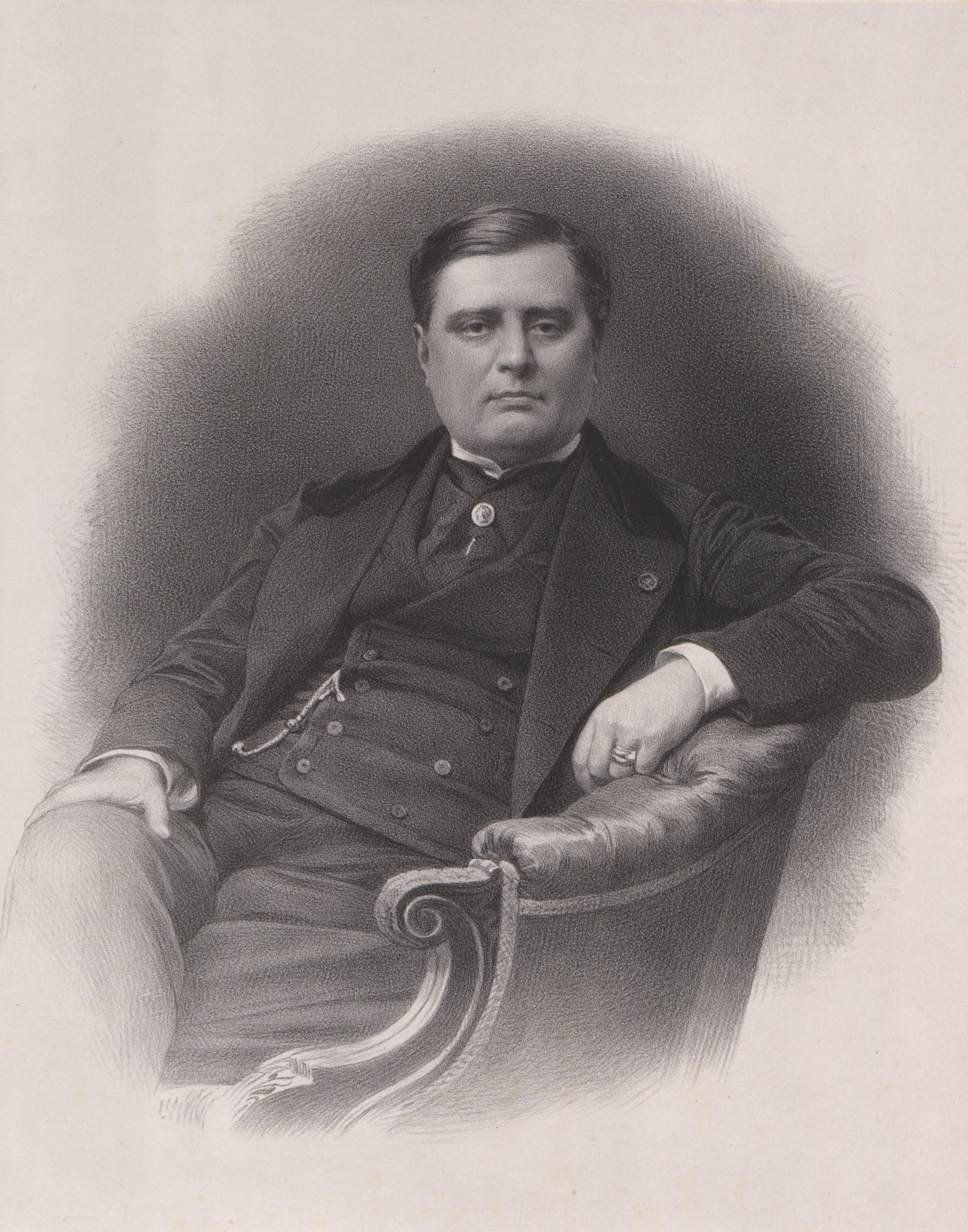
Alexandre, Count Colonna-Walewski the French Minister of Foreign Affairs drafted the Franco–Siamese Treaty based on the Anglo–Siamese Bowring Treaty and, in November 1855, assigned Charles de Montigny to bring the treaty draft to the Siamese government at Bangkok.

As Rear Admiral Laguerre was unable to go to Siam, in 1854, only nine days after appointment of Sir John Bowring as the British plenipotentiary to negotiate the new Anglo–Siamese treaty, Emperor Napoleon III appointed Alphonse de Bourboulon as French plenipotentiary in Canton (Guangzhou) and also French plenipotentiary to negotiate and conclude a new treaty with Siam. In August 1855, after receiving the Bowring Treaty, Earl of Clarendon the British Foreign Secretary, in a mocking gesture, sent a copy of the Bowring Treaty to Count Colonna-Walewski the French Minister of Foreign Affairs at Paris, expressing regret that France would not catch up concluding a new treaty with Siam at the same time with Britain during the high tide of Siam's positive sentiment towards the West. Count Walewski then realized the urgency of sending French envoy to conclude a treaty with Siam to catch up with the British. As Bourboulon was unable to go to Siam, Charles de Montigny the French Consul of Shanghai, who was then at Paris, volunteered to be the imperial envoy to Siam. On 10 October 1855, Emperor Napoleon III, for the third time, appointed a French Plenipotentiary to Siam, this time it was Montigny who took charge of the mission and who would actually go to Siam to conclude the Franco–Siamese Treaty. Montigny was also the candidate favored by the French Catholic mission. Paris Foreign Missions Society (French: Société des Missions Etrangères de Paris, MEP) asked Montigny to include the agreement that guaranteed freedom of Catholic missionary activities in Siam in the treaty.

Count Walewski drafted twenty-two articles in his proposed Franco–Siamese treaty. Walewski took the Anglo–Siamese Bowring Treaty (1855), the Sino–French Treaty of Whampoa (1844) and the Treaty between France and the Imamate of Muscat (modern Oman) concluded in 1844 as models for the new treaty. Most of the treaty terms were identical to that of the Bowring Treaty with expanded details and more articles to clarify any vagueness and obscurities. In November 1855, Count Walewski officially assigned the task of bringing his twenty-two articles of the proposed treaty to negotiate for a new Franco–Siamese treaty at Bangkok. Walewski instructed Montingy that Siam should concede to France no less than that Siam had conceded to the British, at least getting the same concessions as the British. Walewski also instructed that if Siam did not concede, Montigny might directly put forward the Anglo–Siamese Bowring Treaty to become the new Franco–Siamese Treaty with any alterations. Apart from conclusion of a new treaty with Siam, Montigny was also assigned to go to remonstrate the Vietnamese persecutions of Catholic missionaries in Nguyễn-dynasty Vietnam.

=== Montigny's journey to Siam ===
By that time, France had already had extraterritorial jurisdiction in China (Whampoa Treaty, 1844), Oman (Defossés Treaty, 1844) and recently Qajar Persia (Bourée Treaty, July 1855). Charles de Montigny, then 50 years old, left Paris in December 1855, accompanied by his junior diplomat and apparentice the 23-year-old Ernest-Napoléon Godeaux, bringing gifts from the French Emperor including large portraits of Emperor Napoleon and Empress Eugénie encased in glass to present to the Siamese king in his diplomatic mission to negotiate and conclude a new treaty with Siam for France. Montigny became the first French envoy to Siam since the missions of Simon de la Loubère (1687) and Guy Tachard (1698), about 160 years prior. As France sought to position itself as the global protector of Roman Catholic religion and Catholic missionaries, Montigny was obliged to visit Rome first and had to spend some months in Rome waiting for an audience with Pope Pius IX.

Montigny was instructed to join with the British and the Americans in the joint tripartite negotiation with Siam for a new treaty in March 1856. However, Harry Parkes the British representative and Townsend Harris the American representative had earlier left Singapore for Siam in March–April 1856, while Montigny only arrived in Singapore in May, apparently too late. Two weeks after Montigny's arrival in Singapore, the American–Siamese Treaty was signed at Bangkok in May 1856. At Singapore, Montigny faced logistic problems. The corvette Capricieuse that would carry the gifts for the Siamese king would not arrive until June. Montigny also complained that the steamship Marceau that would be his main vessel was too small in size.

Montigny had been in a personal competition with Sir John Bowing the governor of Hong Kong and the British envoy to Siam during the conclusion of the eponymous Bowring Treaty in April 1855. Montigny intended that, in his mission to Siam, the French mission would surpass the preceding British mission in every aspects. At Singapore, apart from his mission to secure the safety of Catholic priests in Vietnam, Montigny was assigned an additional mission from Walewski at Paris to conclude a diplomatic and commercial with Vietnam in similar manner to his Siamese mission. Montigny was also assigned to go to Cambodia because three years earlier, in 1853, Jean-Claude Miche the Apostolic Vicar of Cambodia, on behalf of King Harireak Reamea Ang Duong of Cambodia, sent gifts to Gauthier at Singapore in efforts to establish Franco–Cambodian relations, asking Gauthier to bring the Cambodian presents to the French government at Paris. These Cambodian gifts had indeed reached France in 1854 but the French government had not yet relayed a response so Gauthier asked Montigny to go to Cambodia to explain to the Cambodian king at his presents had not reached France. Siamese government, who regarded Cambodia as Siam's tributary kingdom, was still unaware of this secret Cambodian diplomatic overture with the French Consul at Singapore.

At Singapore, Montigny wrote to Bishop Pallegoix the Vicar Apostolic of Eastern Siam in Bangkok, informing Pallegoix of the imminent arrival of the French imperial diplomatic mission in Siam. Montigny also assigned Pallegoix to secure an introduction letter written by the King of Siam to present Montigny to the Vietnamese Emperor. Pallegoix, who had been residing in Siam since 1830, replied that having the King of Siam write to the Vietnamese Emperor would be of no use because Siam and Vietnam had been enemies, having recently waged wars with each other. Montigny, with unrealisitic expectations, was enraged by Pallegoix's reply, insisting that the King of Siam was obliged to write a letter introducing Montigny to the Vietnamese imperial court to smoothen Montigny's entrance into Vietnam. This incident caused Montigny to adopt a very negative view on the French Bishop Pallegoix.

=== Arrival of Montigny in Siam ===
Charles de Montigny, the French imperial envoy to Siam, eventually left Singapore for Bangkok on 29 June 1856 along with his assistant Godeaux with three vessels; the steamship Marceau, the steam corvette Catinat and the sailing corvette Capricieuse, also with Commodore Jules Collier as the commander of his navy ships. The French diplomatic mission reached the river bar of the Chaophraya River on July 9. Through the course of his mission in Siam, Montigny strove to demonstrate to the Siamese government that France was superior to Britain and the United States, also seeking to follow Bowring's footsteps in Siam. According to Siamese law, all incoming foreign vessels had to report to the post of Paknam or Samut Prakarn first. Montigny sent his assistant Godeaux to report to Phraya Samut Buranurak the governor of Samut Prakarn, also informing the Siamese that Montigny demanded nothing short of Bowring's diplomatic reception house in Bangkok, where Bowring resided during his mission to Siam last year in 1855. This two-storey, European-style reception house, locating in front of Wat Prayurawong temple in modern Thonburi district, had been receiving British envoys since 1822. This house, however, was occupied by the British Consul in Siam Charles Hillier, who refused to leave to make room for the French. The Siamese government then assigned the house of the recently deceased Siamese trade minister Somdet Chaophraya Prayurawong Dit Bunnag, who was a leading negotiator of the Bowring Treaty and had died in April 1855, locating near the British reception house, for Montigny to reside. The Siamese told Montigny that this house was where the Bowring Treaty was signed and had belonged to the trade minister himself. Montigny was satisfied with this arrangement.

King Mongkut of Siam then sent twenty-five small riparian barges to take the French envoys upstream from Samut Prakarn to Bangkok. Two Bunnag brothers-ministers, Chaophraya Si Suriyawong Chuang Bunnag and Chaophraya Rawiwong Kham Bunnag, brought the barges to Samut Prakarn on 12 July 1856. In similar manner to the previous Siamese reception of Western envoys, Chuang Bunnag had Siamese soldiers in red British military costume receive Montigny, who disembarked from his vessel Marceau at Samut Prakarn. Siamese cannons shot 17-gun salute and the military band played British God Save The Queen. Chaophraya Si Suriyawong Chuang Bunnag, whom Montigny called Kalahom (Kalaoum), conversed with Montigny in English language, expressing his joy for France and Siam to resume relations after the long period of hiatus since the reign of King Narai of Ayutthaya in the seventeenth century. The Siamese expected the French mission to leave their warships at Paknam and proceeded to Bangkok, like the previous occasions of British and American missions to Siam. However, Montigny refused to leave French warships at Paknam, saying he wished to take his French warships to salute the Siamese royal flag at Bangkok. The Siamese surprisingly consented. In his later report to the French Foreign Ministry, Montigny boosted that the Siamese consent for Montigny to take French warships to Bangkok was unprecedented.

Montigny, in his steamship Marceau, arrived at Wichaiprasit Fort in Bangkok (where the Siamese attack on the French had taken place in 1688) two days later on July 14, where Prince Kromma Luang Wongsathirat Sanit, King Mongkut's younger half-brother, brought all the five Siamese plenipotentiaries to greet Montigny on the Marceau. Vice-king Pinklao of the Front Palace, the second king of Siam, also wrote a personal letter in English to greet Montigny. The two other French corvettes Catinat and Capricieuse stayed at the river bar through Montigny's mission in Siam. Next day, on July 15, Montigny disembarked from the Marceau with the French shooting 21-gun salute. The Siamese at Wichaiprasit Fort responded by shooting reciprocal 21-gun salute. However, during the cannon shots, one of the French cannon exploded, amputating arms of two French soldiers. Chuang Bunnag and Kham Bunnag escorted Montigny to his assigned residence near Wat Prayurawong temple.

=== Siamese reception of Montigny ===
Bishop Pallegoix had earlier promised Montigny to assign a French Catholic priest as interpreter for Montigny. Montigny, however, held a negative opinion on Pallegoix since even before his arrival in Siam due to the previous letter incident. Pallegoix was further slandered by his fellow French Catholic missionaries, who called Pallegoix as "already becoming Siamese" for his high degree of sympathy towards the Siamese king. Father Larnaudie, one of the eight French priests who had earlier defied the order of the Siamese king in 1849, was then assigned as his interpreter.

On 21 July 1856, the Siamese king Mongkut requested a private audience with the French envoy Montigny. Bishop Pallegoix and Father Larnaudie led Montigny from his residence to ride in a palanquin to have an audience with the king at Amarin Winitchai Throne Hall, where the Siamese king had earlier received Bowring, in the Siamese royal palace. Montigny found the audience not so private as the king was surrounded by his officials prostrating on the floor. King Mongkut asked whether Montigny brought an imperial letter from the French Emperor. The Siamese had been expecting all incoming foreign envoys to bring letters from their respective sovereigns as this would mean a great respect to the Siamese king and the Siamese kingdom. Siamese treatment of the envoy also depended on whether the envoy was bringing a letter from the sovereign or not. Harry Parkes had brought a royal letter from Queen Victoria and Townsend Harris had brought a presidential letter from Franklin Pierce. In his report to Quai d'Orsay, Montigny admitted that him not bringing an imperial letter was a mistake of France. Montigny replied to the Siamese king that if the Siamese king wrote a letter to the French Emperor, the French Emperor would reply in kind. Mongkut further asked why France waited for Britain and the United States to conclude treaties with Siam and then sent envoy after. Montigny replied that the French Empire had been contemplating and preparing sending an envoy to conclude a treaty with Siam no later than the British nor the Americans but, due to many unfortunate shortcomings, the French envoy could only arrive late.

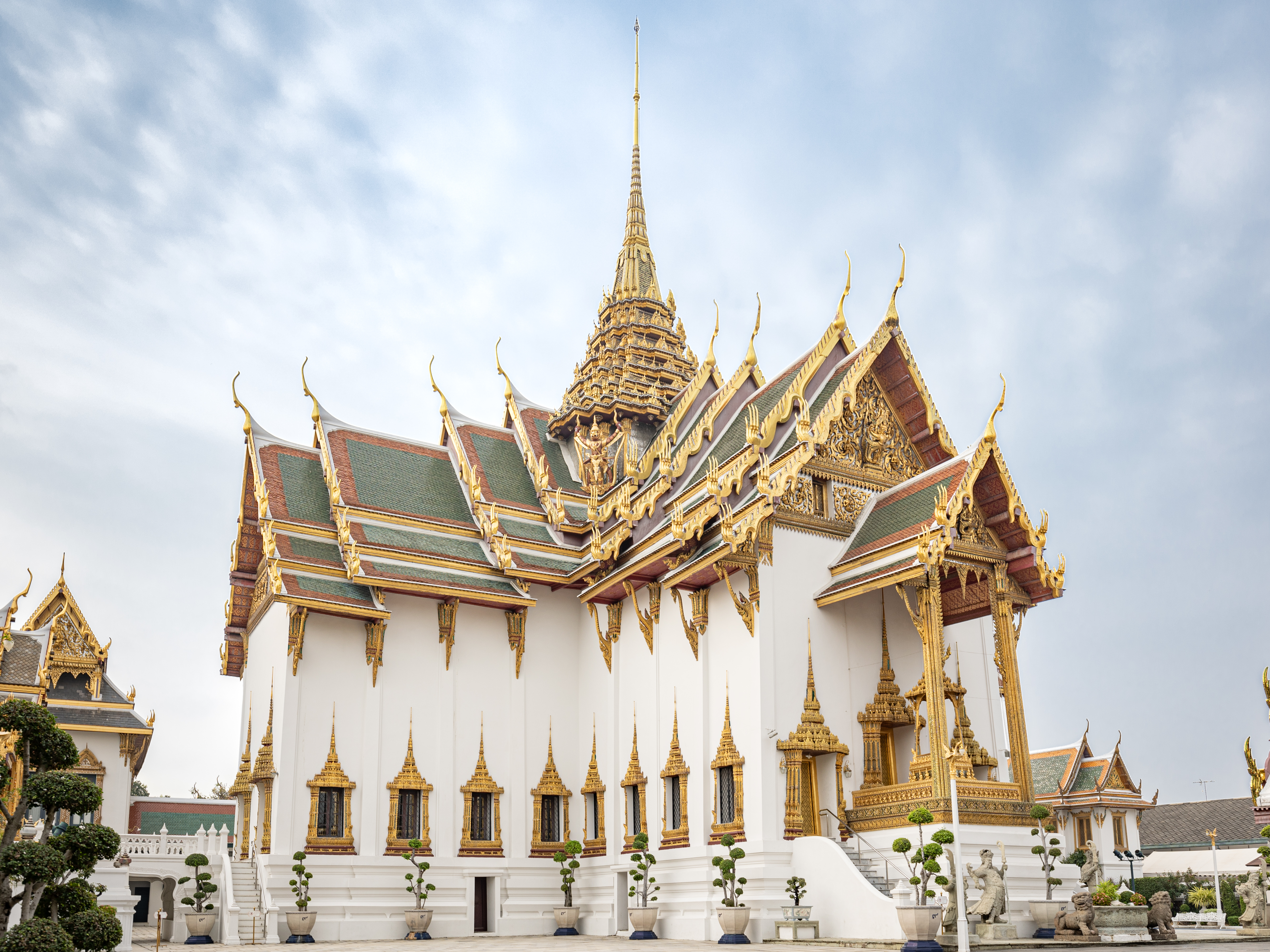
Dusit Maha Prasat Throne Hall in Grand Palace in Bangkok was where King Mongkut ceremonially received the French imperial envoy Charles de Montigny on July 24, 1856.

Montigny's grand audience with King Mongkut was scheduled to be on 24 July 1856. Montigny chose the ceremonies to take place in daylight (in contrast to Bowring's and Harris' audiences with Mongkut, which took place after sunset) in order for the Siamese to clearly see and grandeur of French diplomatic entourage. The procession began on 24 July 1856, at one o'clock in the afternoon. Without imperial letter, the portraits of the French Emperor and the French Empress were placed on the throne of the gilded royal riparian barge as substitute. The procession, in the equal scale of grandeur comparing to the Siamese reception of Chevalier de Chaumont (1685) and Simon de la Loubère (1687), moved from Montigny's residence to the royal palace. Montigny's barge followed the main royal barge. Montigny's assistant Godeaux, the naval commander Collier and Father Larnaudie the interpreter were in the same barge as Montigny. Following Montigny's barge was a separate barge for Bishop Pallegoix. In all these Siamese royal barges were Siamese oarsmen in red costume. Behind the Siamese reception procession were the French warships. Upon arrival of Montigny at the royal palace, the Siamese shot twenty-one salute cannon shots. French warships reciprocated with seventeen cannon salute shots.

Montigny disembarked from the royal barge and he was transported, sitting on a sedan chair carried on the shoulders of Siamese porters, to the Dusit Maha Prasat Throne Hall, where the royal audience took place. In the throne hall, male members of Siamese royal family, ministers and officials all prostrated on the floor in absolute silence and great solemnity. Unlike the Siamese, Montigny was not required to prostrate himself on the floor but rather standing, flanked at his both sides by Collier and Pallegoix, in front of the king, who had been sitting on the high throne. The life-sized portraits of Emperor Napoleon and Empress Eugénie were placed to flank at both sides of Mongkut's throne. Montigny bowed to King Mongkut, read his own diplomatic letter to the Siamese king in French language and then Father Larnaudie read the English-translated version. In his royal speech, Mongkut expressed his joy of the French diplomatic mission to Siam. After the conclusion of the grand Siamese royal reception, Kham Bunnag the Phrakhlang led Montigny on a tour to visit Theravadin Buddhist temples in Bangkok and also to see the royal elephants.

=== Conclusion of the Montigny Treaty ===
After the grand audience, on 30 July 1856, King Mongkut appointed five Siamese plenipotentiaries to discuss and negotiate the Franco–Siamese Treaty with Montigny (Note that the Bunnag surname was only granted in 1913 and Thai historians apply the surname onto historical figures to keep track of familial lineages);

- Prince Wongsathirat Sanit, younger half-brother of King Mongkut
- Somdet Chaophraya Phichaiyat, personal name That Bunnag, the king's regent in the royal capital of Bangkok
- Chaophraya Si Suriyawong, personal name Chuang Bunnag, the Samuha Kalahom or Prime Minister of Southern Siam
- Chaophraya Rawiwong, personal name Kham Bunnag, the Phrakhlang or Minister of Trade and Foreign Affairs
- Chaophraya Yommaraj, personal name Nuch, the Head of Nakhonban Police and Minister of Justice, not from Bunnag family

Franco–Siamese negotiation began on 30 July 1856, taking place at the Thonburi Palace, which had been the residence of Prince Wongsathirat Sanit. The negotiation went smoothly and quickly as most of the terms had been settled in accordance with the Bowring Treaty. However, there were some issues;

- Montigny demanded that the Siamese government should guarantee the safety of the wealth of French subjects in Siam. Montigny cited the example of a British merchant named Hubertson, who was robbed in China in 1845 and the Chinese imperial government did not compensate for Hubertson's losses. Siam refused to guarantee the French wealth, giving the reason that the Siamese government had no means to measure the wealth of French subjects in Siam. Montigny compromised by adding the clause that, in case of robbery on French subjects in Siam, both on land and sea, the Siamese government would do the best to arrest the thief and retrieve the stolen goods. However, the Siamese government was not obliged to compensate for the losses if Siam did not manage to return the goods.
- According to Montigny, French navy was the expression of French power and prestige to the world so France tolerated no restrictions on its naval navigation. Montigny insisted that all French vessels, including French warships, should be granted free passage to Bangkok. This demand was unique to France. The Siamese apparently did not agree with this notion due to concern over possible security breach. France and Siam did not settle on this issue, resulting in discrepancies in French and Siamese language versions of the treaty. In the French version, French ships were allowed free access to Bangkok. Informing the Siamese government was just a formality. However, in the Siamese language version, all foreign vessels especially the warships should be granted permission by the Siamese government first in order to travel upstream from Samut Prakarn to Bangkok. This issue would have future complications as France would be the only Western nation who brought warships to Bangkok in gunboat diplomacy threats in 1864 and 1893.
- The French accepted the Siamese restriction of travel and land ownership of French subjects in Siam to the area of twenty-four hours of boat passage from Bangkok. However, Montigny proposed that French Catholic missionaries should be allowed to go to preach in the faraway Siamese regional cities and that French naturalists should be allowed to go the explore Siamese geography and wildlife. Siam agreed to this proposal on conditions that any French subjects who wished to venture out of the allowed area should obtain permission and a travel passport from the Siamese government in conjunction with the French consul. French missionaries had been expecting Bishop Pallegoix, as the Vicar Apostolic of Siam, to issue travel permits but Montigny gave this power to the French consul instead due to his contempt for Pallegoix.
- Siam wanted France to provide assistance to Siamese ships in France and anywhere in the world that French consulates existed, in case of need. This clause originated from the American–Siamese Treaty of May 1856, in which the United States promised to provide assistance to the Siamese anywhere in the world that American consulates stood. Montigny consented to this proposal as Montigny speculated that there would not be so much Siamese venturing around the world to be the burden of France and that helping non-enemy neutral nations had been an established international protocol.

Discussion on this Franco–Siamese treaty took only ten days as every points had been presumably agreed on 5 August 1856. The signing of the treaty, during which traditional Siamese administrative seals were imprinted on the treaty, took place on Friday, fourteenth waxing of the ninth month, Year 1218 of Culāsakaraj Era, Year of Dragon, 15 August 1856, at the Thonburi Palace. Montigny personally chose August 15 as the signing day because it was the day when the French celebrated the Feast Day of the late Emperor Napoleon I (Napoleon was born on August 15). After the signing of the treaty, the Siamese at Wichaiprasit fort shot 21-gun salute, while the French warship Marceau at Wichaiprasit fort shot 21-gun salute in response.

== Sovereigns and signatories ==
=== Sovereigns ===
==== France ====
- His Majesty Napoleon III, Emperor of the French (Sa Majésté Napoleon III, L'Empereur des Français)
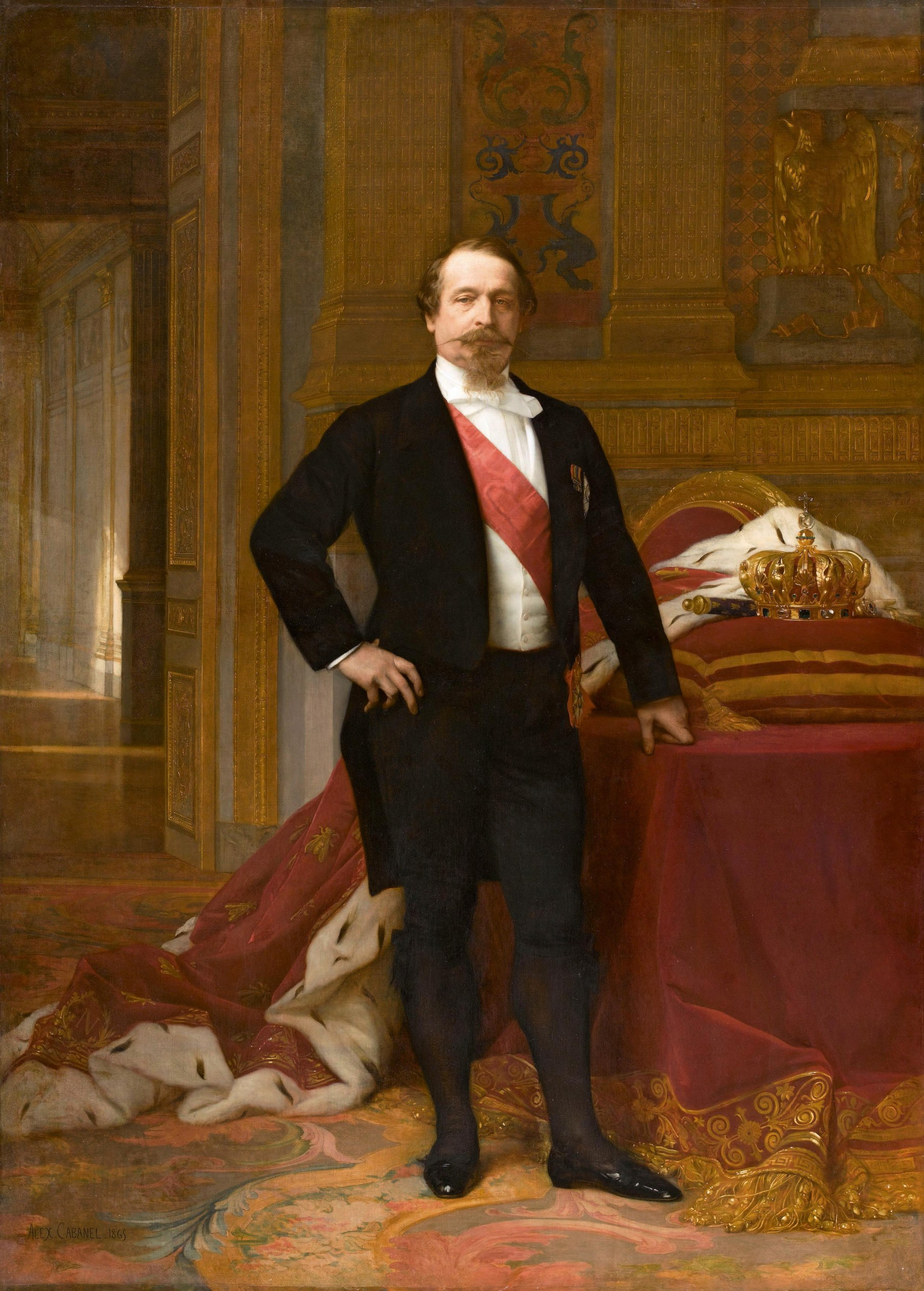
Napoleon III, Emperor of the French

==== Siam ====
- Phrabath Somdet Phrabaramend Mahamakout Southasamouti Thephaya Phongsavongsadit Vorakasatri Vorakhatya Raxani Karodom Chaturanta Boromma Maha Chakraphati Raxa Sangkat Boroma Thamika Maha Raxathirat Borommanaroth Bophith Phra Chom Klao Chao You Houa (King Mongkut of Siam), the First King of Siam (premier Roi de Siam).
- Phrabath Somdet Phrabovorentharamesoum Mahisvaret Raxan Mahantavoradexo Xaya Moholan Khoun Adoundet Sarapha Thevesaranouraka Bovora Choula Chakraphati Raxa Sangkat Bovora Thamika Raxa Bophith Phra Pin Klao Chao You Houa (Vice-King Pinklao), the Second King of Siam (second Roi de Siam).
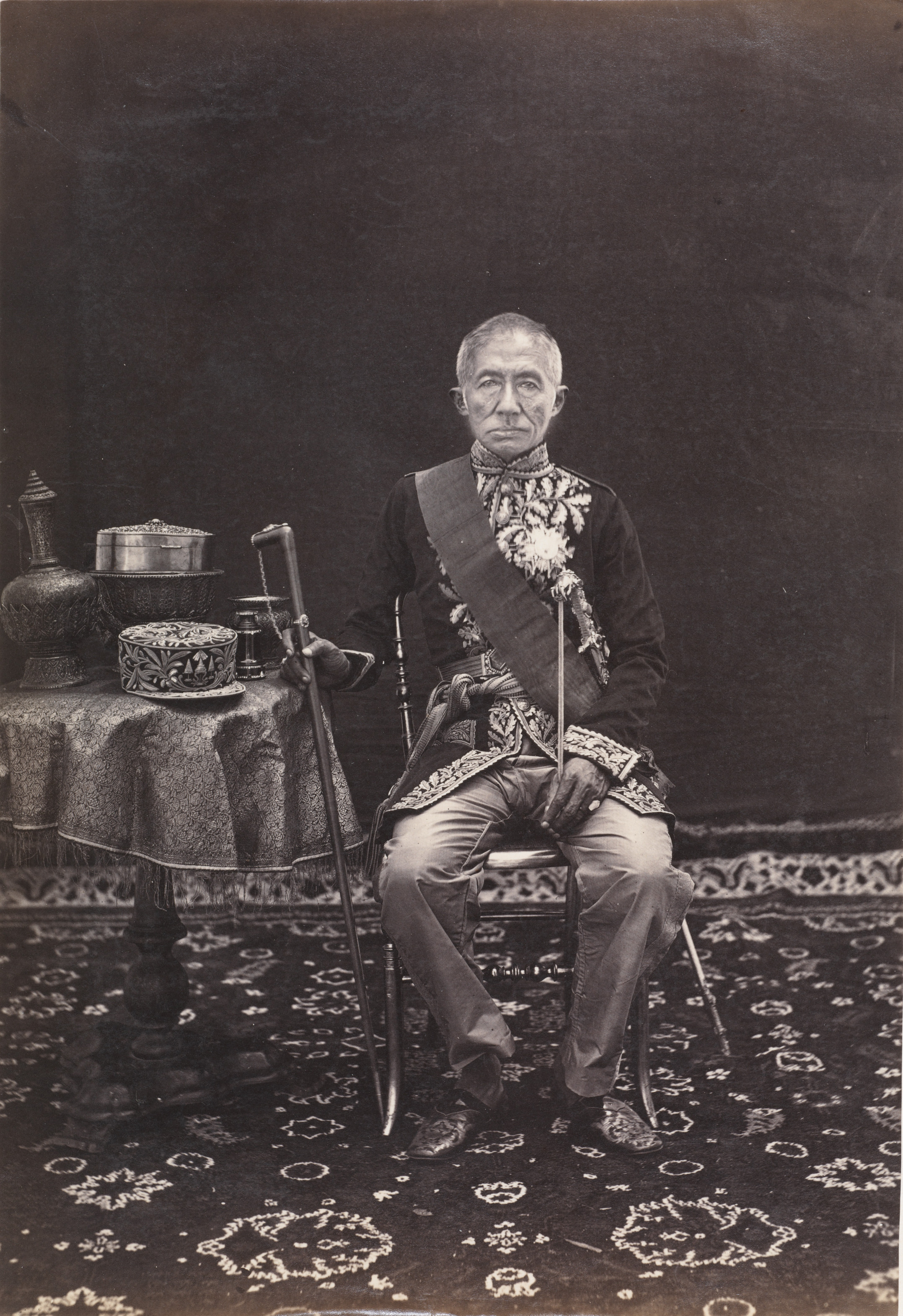
  Mongkut, First King of Siam
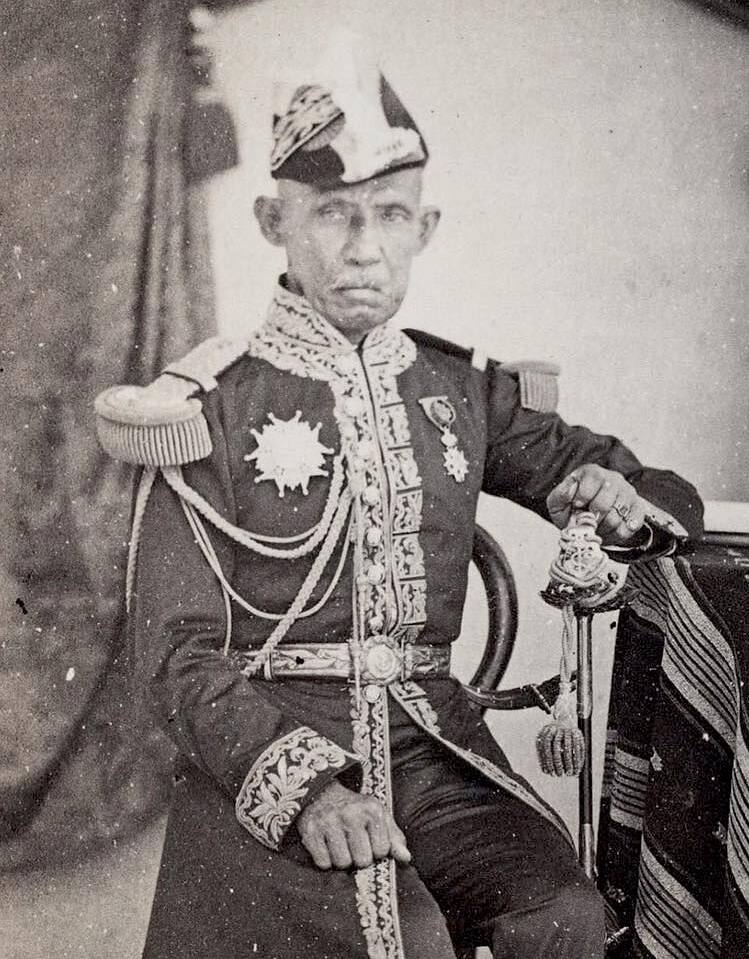
  Pinklao, Second King of Siam

=== Signatories ===
==== France ====
- Charles-Louis-Nicolas-Maximilien de Montigny, official of the Imperial Order of Legion of Honour (officier de l'Ordre impérial de la Légion d'Honneur)

==== Siam ====
- Phra Chao Nougyathen Kromalouang Vougsathiraxa Sanith (Prince Kromma Luang Wongsathirat Sanit, younger half-brother of King Mongkut)
- Somdet Chao Phraya Boroma Maha Phixayati Naranetra Naroth Raxa Sourya Vongsa Sakonla Phongsa Patittha Moukha Matayathibodi Traya Sarana si Batana Chada Sakonla Maha Raxa xati Benthon Paramenton Maha Raxa Varo Prakan Maho Dexanouphab Bophith (Somdet Chaophraya Phichaiyat, personal name That Bunnag) the Siamese king's regent in the capital (chargé du gouvernement de la capitale)
- Chao Phraya sisouriyavong Samanta Phonxa Phisoutha Maha Bourout Ratanodom (Chaophraya Si Suriyawong, personal Chuang Bunnag, the Samuha Kalahom or Prime Minister of Southern Siam), Minister of War (ministre de la guerre, this was the direct translation of Kalahom, which, by the nineteenth century, was not responsible for war anymore), in charge of the Southern provinces (chargé du gouvernement général des provinces du sud-ouest)
- Chaophraya Ravivongsa Mahakosatibodi (Chaophraya Rawiwong, personal name Kham Bunnag, younger brother of Chuang Bunnag) the Phrakhlang or Siamese Minister of Trade and Foreign Affairs (ministre des affaires étrangères), in charge of the Eastern provinces (chargé du gouvernement général des provinces du sud-est)
- Chao Phraya Yomarat Xatisenangkha Narinthon Mahintharatibodi Sivixai Raxa Mahaya Souen Borirak Phoumi Phitak Lokakarathanta Ritti Naqhouban (Chaophraya Yommarat, personal name Nuch, head of the Nakhonban police), Minister of Justice (ministre de la justice)
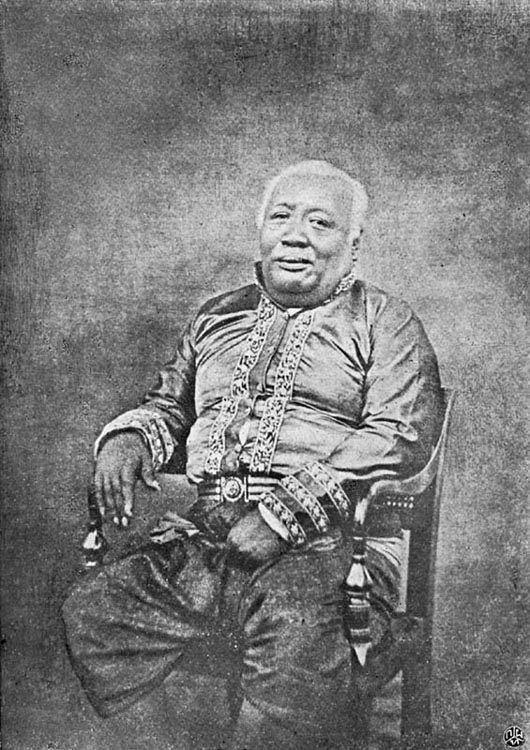
Prince Wongsathirat Sanit, younger half-brother of King Mongkut

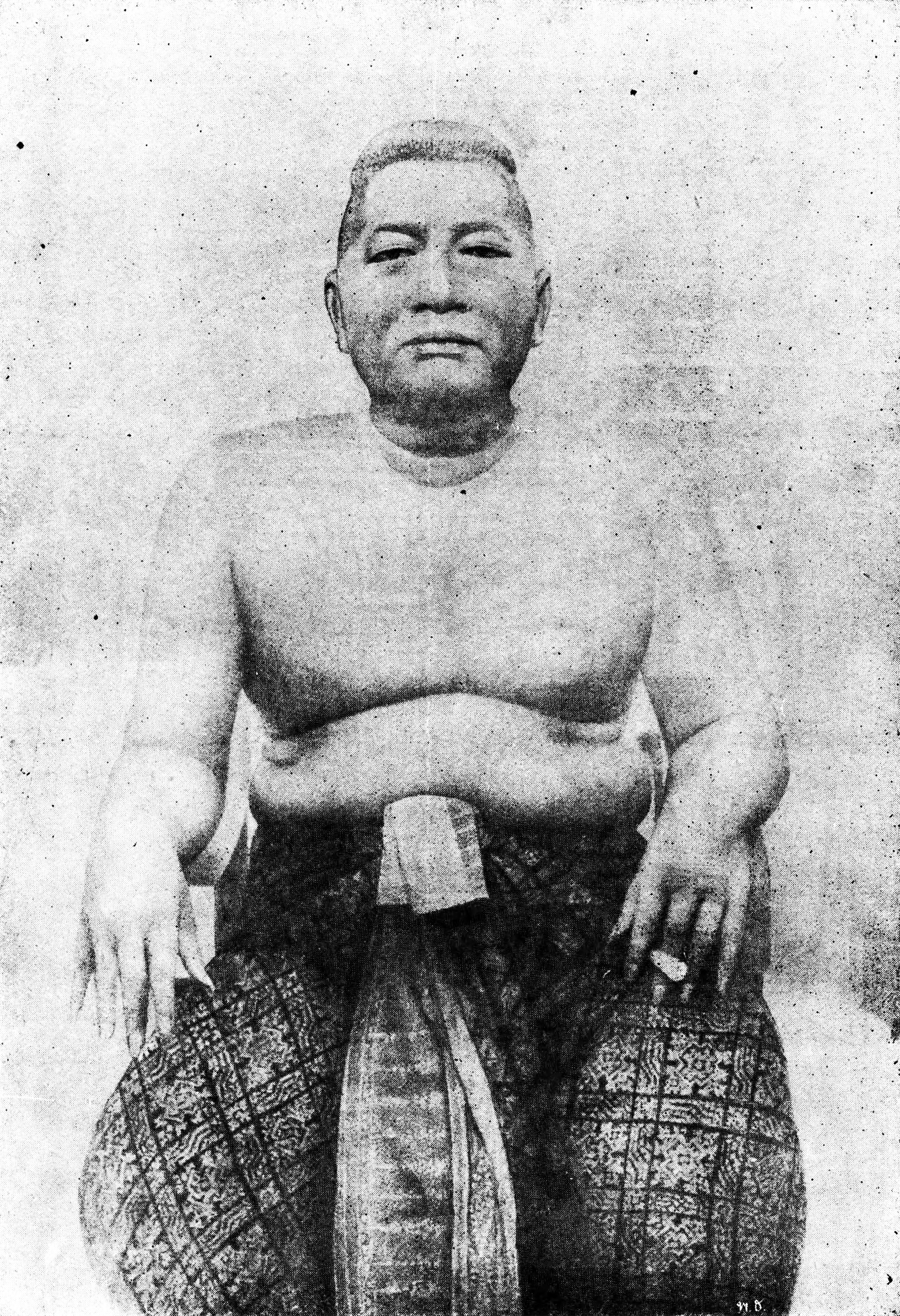
Somdet Chaophraya Phichaiyat (That Bunnag), the king's regent in the capital

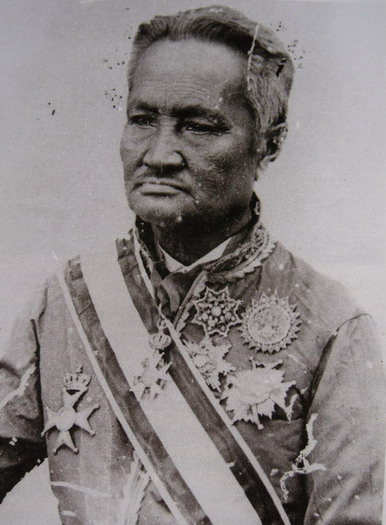
Chaophraya Si Suriyawong (Chuang Bunnag) the Samuha Kalahom or Prime Minister of Southern Siam

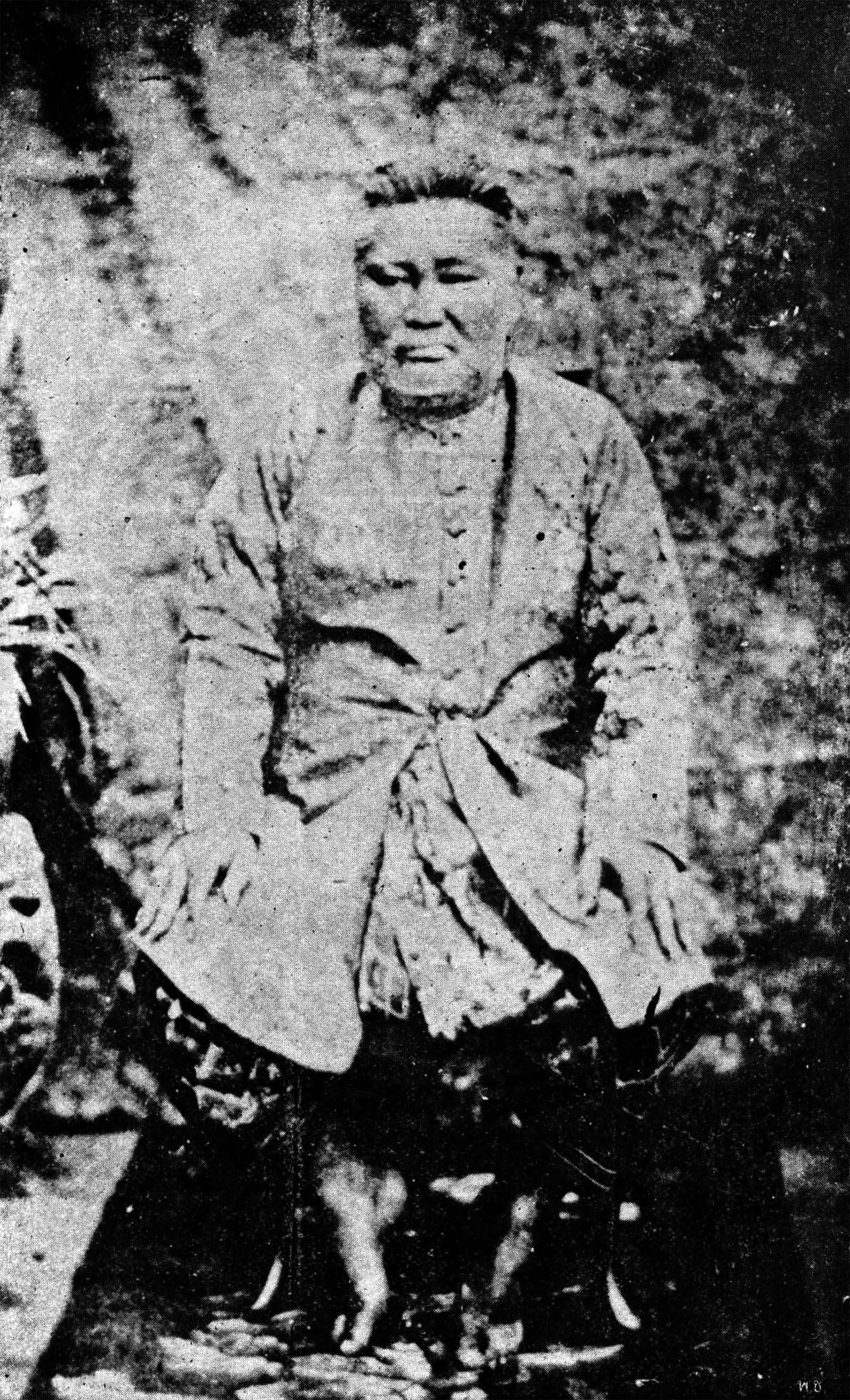
Chaophraya Rawiwong (Kham Bunnag) the Phrakhlang or Minister of Trade and Foreign Affairs, his title was later changed to Chaophraya Thiphakorawong.

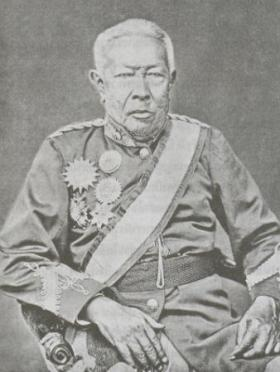
Chaophraya Yommarat (Nuch), head of the Nakhonban police, he later became Chaophraya Phutharaphai the Prime Minister of Northern Siam

== Treaty terms ==
The terms of this Franco–Siamese Montigny Treaty of 1856 were largely identical to those of the Anglo–Siamese Bowring Treaty, which was concluded between Great Britain, with Sir John Bowring as the British plenipotentiary and the Siamese government in April 1855, one year and four months before the conclusion of Montigny's Treaty. Anglo–Siamese treaty terms also included the Supplementary Articles of Harry Parkes, concluded in May 1856, clarifying some unclear and vague articles of the Bowring Treaty, two months before the arrival of Montigny in Bangkok in late July 1856. Earl of Clarendon the British Foreign Secretary had sent a copy of the Bowring Treaty to Count Walewski, the French Minister of Foreign Affairs. Taking the Anglo–Siamese Bowring Treaty as the model, Count Walewski drafted twenty-two articles for this proposed Franco–Siamese treaty and assigned Montigny to bring these twenty-two drafted articles to the Siamese government. Franco–Siamese negotiation and discussion of this proposed treaty in Bangkok lasted only for ten days as most of the terms were identical to the earlier treaty Siam had concluded with Britain as the Siamese government readily accepted Walewski's draft treaty.

The final version of this Franco–Siamese Treaty consisted of twenty-four articles, in comparison to the Bowring Treaty, which contained only ten articles. More articles were from the clauses of the Sino–French Whampoa Treaty (1844) introduced by Walewski not present in the Bowring Treaty. The treaty was made in both French and Siamese languages and the treaty versions of both languages could be used as the references (Le présent Traité ayant été rédigé en français et en siamois, et les deux versions ayant la même portée et le même sens, le texte français sera officiel et fera foi sous tous les rapports, aussi bien que le texte siamois.). The treaty was to be in effect one year after the signing or once the treaty had been ratified by the French imperial government at Paris. The treaty also provided the permission to amend of the terms after twelve years. After twelve years, if France or Siam wanted to alter the terms, it was to be done through at least one-year prior notification and the consent of both parties (Bowring and Harris Treaties stipulated possible amendment after ten years).

=== Establishment of relations ===
The Article 1 of the treaty stipulated perpetual friendship between the French Emperor and the two Siamese kings and their respective successors, as well as between the people of two countries;

Il y aura paix constante et amitié perpétualle entre S. M. l'Empereur des Français, ses héritiers et successeurs, d'une part, et Leurs Majestés les premier et second Rois de Siam, leurs héritiers et successeurs d'autre part, ainsi qu'entre les sujets des deux Etats sans exception de personnes ni de lieux.

There shall be constant peace and perpetual friendship between His Majesty the Emperor of the French, his heirs and successors, on the one hand, and Their Majesties the first and second Kings of Siam, their heirs and successors, on the other hand, as well as between the subjects of the two States without exception of persons or places.

This kind of introduction to the treaty was similar to the Bowring Treaty.

Also in the Article 1, Siam and France reciprocally granted the Most Favored Nation status to each other, meaning that if Siam was to concede any benefits and privileges to any other nations, France would be automatically accorded such benefits and privileges. (et auront réciproquement droit à tous les privilèges et avantages qui sont ou pourront être accordés aux sujets des nations étrangères les plus favorisées, and shall reciprocally be entitled to all the privileges and advantages which are or may be granted to the subjects of the most favored foreign nations) Siam was first exposed to the concept of "Most Favored Nation" in the American–Siamese Roberts Treaty of 1833. The Most Favored Nation clause also appeared on the Article X of the Bowring Treaty; "The British Government and its subjects will be allowed free and equal participation in any privileges, that may have been, or may hereafter be, granted by the Siamese Government, to the Government or subjects of any other nation."

France promised to provide aid and protection to any Siamese subjects or merchant ships in need of assistance anywhere in the world where French consulates and French warships were available. (Les sujets et les navires de commerce siamois recevront, en outre, à l'étranger, aide et protection des consuls et des bâtiments de guerre français, Siamese subjects and merchant ships will also receive aid and protection abroad from French consuls and warships.) This clause originated from the Article I of the American–Siamese Harris Treaty of May 1856. Because the United States was very far from Siam and virtually no Siamese would ever go to the United States to trade, the United States could not reciprocally give a concession to Siam so the United States promised to provide support and protection to any Siamese it found abroad with available nearby American consulates. However, these touching promises did not materalize because the Siamese did not venture out into the world in great numbers.

=== Extraterritoriality ===
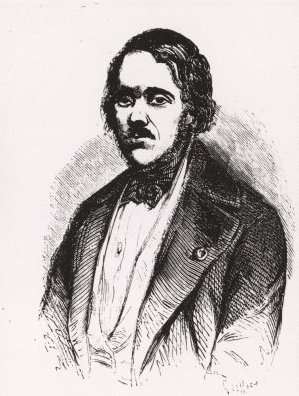
François-Louis Laporte, comte de Castelnau, a French naturalist, was the first official French consul to Siam (two unofficial consuls preceded him), arriving in Bangkok in 1858. Castelnau was the first of successive French consuls who would have problematic relations with Siamese government.

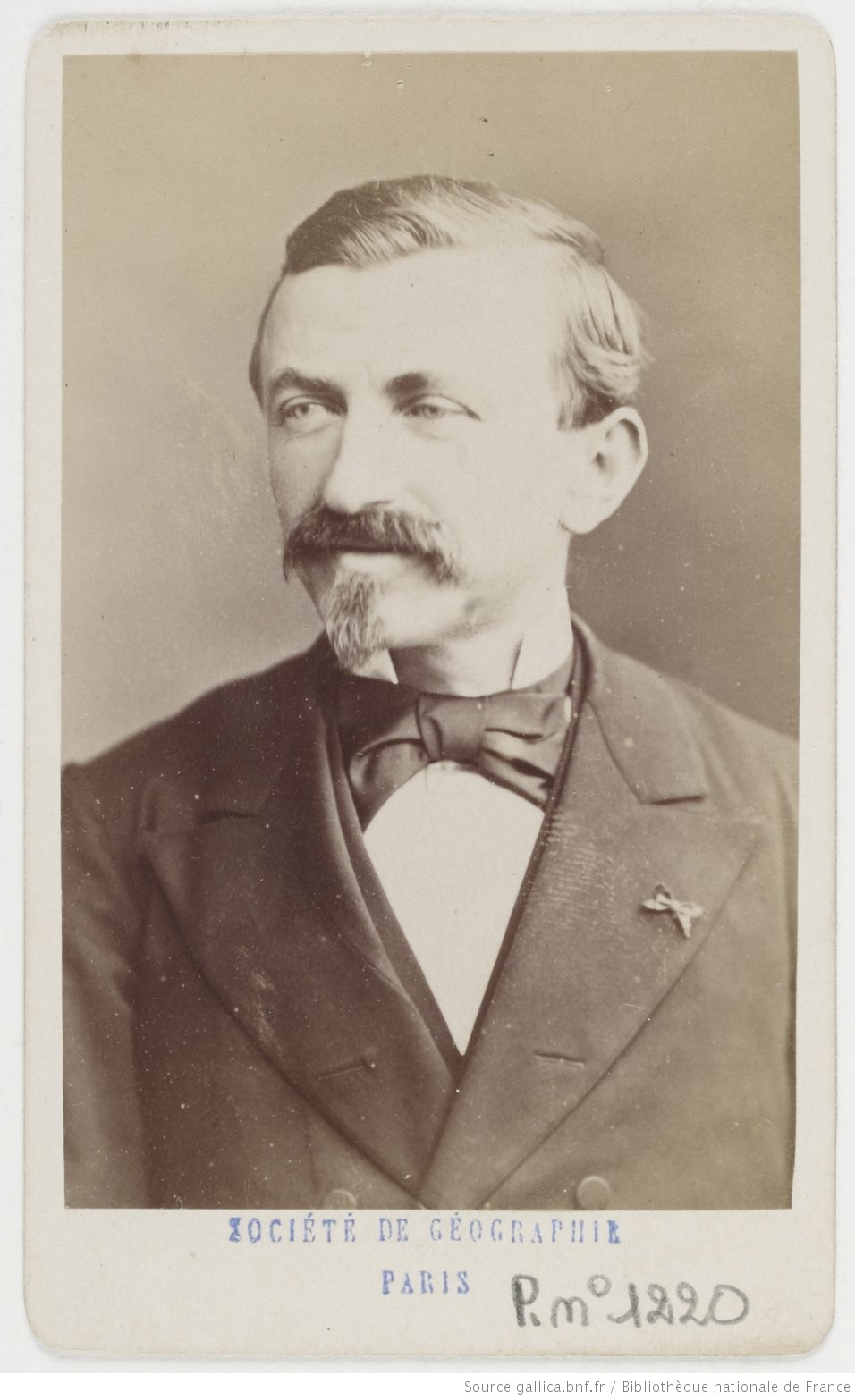
Amédée Gréhan, a friend of Montigny, was appointed by King Mongkut as Siam's consul in Paris in 1863 with Siamese title Phra Sayam Thuranurak (Thai: พระสยามธุรานุรักษ์). Gréhan would remain de facto representative of Siam in France for sixteen years until his death in 1879.

Article 2 stipulated establishment of French consular authority in Siam (se reconnaissent réciproquement le droit le nommer des consuls et agents consulaires pour résider dans leurs Etats respectifs, mutually recognize each other's right to appoint consuls and consular agents to reside in their respective States). This permission to establish consular jurisdiction was reciprocal, meaning that Siam could also establish a consulate in France. France was the first Western nation to allow Siam to establish a consulate. King Mongkut would later appoint Amédée Gréhan, a friend of Montigny, with Siamese title Phra Sayam Thuranurak, as the Siamese Consul at Paris in 1863.

The initial version of the Bowring Treaty stipulated that legal cases involving British subjects as defendants would be "jointly" overseen by both British and Siamese officials. However, Law Officers of the Crown saw that British subjects in Siam should be under exclusive authority of the British consul in Siam without any interference from the Siamese government. Supplementary Agreement of Harry Parkes, concluded in May 1856, clarified the issue by stating that legal cases involving British subjects in Siam were to be under unilateral authority of the British consul without Siamese interference. On this matter, in this Montigny Treaty, French subjects were under exclusive authority of French Consul in Siam as any legal cases involving French subjects as defendants would be judged by the French consul alone without Siamese interference, under similar conditions to the British. The French, in return, promised not to interfere in any legal cases involving native Siamese subjects;

Le consul de France s'abtiendra de toute intervention dans les contestations entre sujets siamois ou entre des Siamois et des étrangers. De leur côte, les Français dépendront, pour toutes les difficultés qui pourraient s'élever entre eux, de la jurisdiction française, et l'autorité siamois n'aura à s'en mêler en aucune manière, non plus que des differénds qui surviendraient entre Français et étrangers.

The French consul will refrain from any interventions in disputes between Siamese subjects or between the Siamese and other foreigners. For their part, the French will be subjected to French jurisdiction for any difficulties that may arise between them, and the Siamese authorities will have no involvement whatsoever, nor in any disputes that may arise between the French and other foreigners.

However, exception existed in case of an escalated armed brawl, the Siamese authority was obliged to intervene (à moins que ces differénds dégénérant en rixes à main armée, ne la force à intervenir, unless these disputes escalate into armed brawls, forcing [Siam] to intervene).

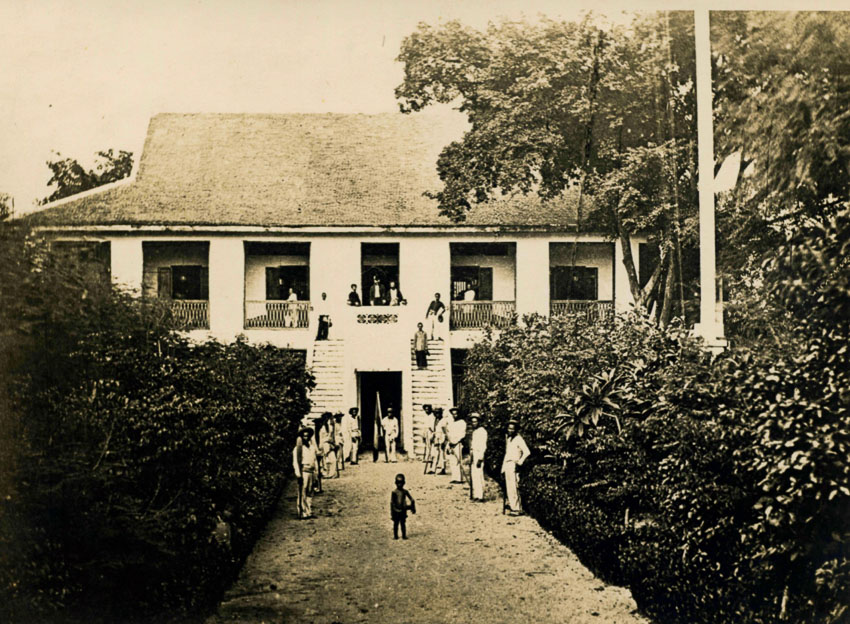
French consulate in Bangkok around the 1860s; in 1857, Montigny rented a land on the bank of Chaophraya River to establish the French consulate, becoming modern French Embassy in Bangrak District.

Duties of the French consul in Siam were to exercise jurisdiction over French subjects in Siam, acting as judge on any legal cases involving a French subject as defendant, to enforce these treaty terms on the French subjects in Siam, to act as intermediary in any contacts between French subjects and the Siamese government and to issue patents and permits to the French subjects in Siam. Also, according to the Most Favored Nation principle, if Siam granted any rights and benefits to the consul of any other nations, the French consul would also be accorded similar privileges (Ils jouiront, ainsi que les agents consulaires et les chanceliers de consulat, de tous les privilèges et immunités qui pourront être accordés dans leur résidence aux agents de même rang de la nation la plus favorisées, They [French consuls], along with consular agents and consulate chancellors, shall enjoy all the privileges and immunities that may be granted in their residence to agents of the same rank of the most favoured nation.). Siamese government held no authorities over the crew of any French vessels, who were subjected to exclusive consular jurisdiction.

=== Commerce ===
Article 5 stated that French merchants were allowed to trade privately and directly with the Siamese without having to trade through Phra Khlang Sinkha (Royal Warehouse) or through the Chinese–Siamese tax farmers. The British and the Americans had already been granted exemption from Siamese royal monopoly in their respective Burney (1826) and Roberts (1833) Treaties;

à s'y livrer au commerce en toute sécurité, à acheter et à vendre des marchandises à qui bon leur semblera, sans que cette liberté puisse être entravée par aucun monopole ou privilèges exclusif de vente d'achat.

to engage in trade safely, to buy and sell goods to whomever they please, without this freedom being hindered by any monopolies nor exclusive buying and selling privileges.

Commercial concessions of Siam to France were mostly identical to the Siamese concessions to Britain in the Bowring Treaty, in which the general import duty of all commodities was fixed at the low rate of three percent, stipulated in the Article 18;

Le droit à percevoir sur les marchandises importées par navires français dans le Royaume de Siam n'excèrdera point trois pour cent de la valeur. Il sera payable en nature ou en argent, au choix de l'importateur.

The duty to be levied on goods imported by French ships into the Kingdom of Siam shall not exceed three percent of the value. It shall be payable in kind or in cash, at the importer's option.

The import duty would be levied according to the value (Ad valorem) of the merchandises, not for the quantity as Siamese duties had traditionally been levied. The duties could be paid by money or by the commodity good itself, according to the choice of the merchant. The imported goods would be levied of customs only once through the merchant's venture in Siam (Après le payement du droit d'entrée de trois pour cent, les marchandises pourront être vendues en gros ou en détail, sans avoir à supporter aucune charge ou surtaxe quelconque, After payment of the three percent entry fee, the goods can be sold wholesale or retail, without having to bear any charges or surcharges whatsoever).

For export duty, like in the Bowring Treaty, each individual exported good was assigned a fixed rate of export duty. To prevent confusion, thirteen trade articles were listed as paying tax "internally", meaning that the export duties of these goods were levied inside of Siam, while other fifty-two articles were listed as paying export duties upon departure from Siam. The Siamese government was forbidden to raise this concluded import duty in the future, as stipulated in Article 20; Moyennant l'acquittement des droits ci-dessus mentionnés, et dont il est expressément interdit d'augmenter le montant à l'avenir, Subject of the payment of the aforementioned fees, the amount of which may not be increased in the future. Also, according to the principle of Most Favored Nation; le Gourvernement siamois venait réduire des droits prélevés sur les marchandises importées ou exportées par navires siamois ou autres, le bénéfice de cette réduction serait immédiatement applicable aux produits similares importés au exportés par navires français (If, subsequently, the Siamese Government was to reduce duties levied on goods imported or exported by the Siamese or other vessels, the benefit of this reduction would be immediately applicable to similar products imported or exported by French vessels.).

In case of famine or food shortage, the Siamese government reserved its right and power to impose ban on the export of rice, fish and salt. (le Gouvernement siamois se réserve la faculté d'interdire la sortie du sel, du riz et du poisson, pour le cas où il y aurait lieu appréhender une disette dans le Royaume de Siam, The Siamese Government reserves the right to prohibit the export of salt, rice and fish, in the event that there is reason to expect a famine in the Kingdom of Siam.) However, in order to impose the ban, the Siamese government had to notify one month in advance and the ban would not have retrospective effect, meaning that if French merchants had already bought the rice, fish and salt before the ban, they were to retain and export the food; cette interdiction, qui devra être publiée un mois à l'avance, ne saurait avoir aucun effet rétroactif, This ban, which must be published one month in advance, will not have any retroactive effect.

In the same manner as in the Bowring Treaty, attached to this Montigny Treaty was the "Regulations of French trade in the Kingdom of Siam" (French: Réglement anquel le commerce français sera soumis dans le royaume de Siam); the Siamese regulations on foreign commerce, which the French merchants were obliged to comply. These regulations imposed by Siam on the French were exactly the same that Siam had been imposing on the British and the Americans;

- Upon arrival in Siam, all French merchant vessels had to report to the Siamese authority at Paknam Samut Prakarn, downstream from Bangkok at the mouth of Chaophraya River. French merchants had to inform the Siamese at Samut Prakarn the amount of firearms, weapons and gunpowder they had been carrying and had to unload all of the weapons and ammunitions to the Siamese at Samut Prakarn in order to proceed to Bangkok. These weapons left to the Siamese at Samut Prakarn were to be retrieved upon their departure. Any vessels who failed to report and make these obligatory procedures at Samut Prakarn would be subjected to an 800-baht fine and they had to return to Samut Prakarn to undergo their skipped procedures in order to be allowed to go to Bangkok.
- Upon arrival in Bangkok, the French merchants had to submit the list of their imported goods to the French Consul within twenty-four hours of their arrival (with exception on Sundays or any Christian holidays) in order for the Siamese custom to levy the import duties. Failure to report the list of imported goods within twenty-four hours or incomplete submission of the articles would be subjected to a 400-baht fine.
- French merchants were strictly forbidden to sell any of the imported goods before the completion of the levy of import duties. Contravention of this law would result in an 800-baht fine.

=== Travel and Land Ownership ===
In the same manner as the treaties Siam had earlier concluded with Britain and the United States, Siam assigned two layers of permissible travel and land ownership of Westerners;

- Inner Layer: the area of 200 sen (six kilometers) surrounding the royal capital of Bangkok, measuring from Bangkok city walls.
  In this inner area, French subjects could reside and rent lands but could not take possession of lands. Only when the French subject had resided in Siam for ten years or was specially granted permission by the government that the French subject would be able to buy and own lands in this inner area. Boundaries of this inner layer had already been demarcated in the Harry Parkes Agreement of May 1856 that the northern limit was at Nonthaburi, the eastern limit was at Bangkapi, the western limit was at Bangphrom Canal and the southern limit was at Bang Pakok.
- Middle Layer: the area from the limit of the Inner Layer to the distance of twenty-four hours of riparian boat passage from Bangkok.
  In this Middle Layer, French subjects could freely reside, buy and own lands without restrictions. The limits of this Middle Layer had already been defined in the Parkes Agreement that the northern limit was at Lopburi, the eastern limits were at Bangpakong River and the Sichang Island and the western limits were at Suphanburi, Ratchaburi and Phetchaburi. Once a French subject had owned a land, he was obliged to develop the land within three years or else he would be forced to sell the land back to the Siamese government in its original price. (Foreigner land ownership in Siam was terminated in post-WWI treaties of the 1920s.)

Mais il ne pourront résider d'une manière permanente qu'à Bangkok, et, autour de cette ville, dans un rayon d'une étendue égale à l'espace parcouru en vingt-quatre heures par les bateaux du pays. Dans l'intérieur de ces limites, ils pourront, en tout temps, acheter, vendre, louer et bâtir des maisons, former des dépôts ou magasins d'approvisionnements, acheter, vendre et affermer des terrains et des plantations. Toutefois, lorsqu'ils voudront acheter des terrains sìtuès à moins de six kilomètres des murs de Bangkok, il sera nécessaire qu'ils y soient spécialement autorisés par le Gouvernement siamois, à moins qu'ils n'aient déjà résidé pendant dix années dans le Royaume de Siam.

However, they may only reside permanently in Bangkok and, around that city, within a radius equals to the distance traveled in twenty-four hours by the country's ships. Within these limits, they may, at any time, buy, sell, rent, and build houses, establish depots or supply stores, and buy, sell, and lease land and plantations. Nevertheless, when they wish to purchase land situated within six kilometers from the walls of Bangkok, they must obtain special permission from the Siamese government, unless they have already resided for ten years in the Kingdom of Siam.

- Outer layer: the area outside of the twenty-four hour travel time by boat from Bangkok. Westerners in general were not allowed to venture out of the designated area into this outer layer. However, Montigny proposed that French Catholic missionaries and French naturalists should be allowed to go out to Siam's peripheral regions. Siam then established the system of allowing French subjects to travel out of the allowed area with the endorsement of both the Siamese government and the French consul.

Si ces Français sont des savants, tels qui naturalistes et autres, voyageant pour le progrès des sciences, ils recevront de l'autorité siamoise tous les soins et bons offices de nature à les aider dans l'accomplissement de leur mission.

If these Frenchmen who are scholars, such as naturalists and others, traveling for the advancement of science, they will receive from the Siamese authorities all the care and good offices necessary to help them in the accomplishment of their mission.

French subjects venturing out into Siam's periphery were required to carry the permit and identification passport or else they could be arrested by the Siamese police.

In the eighteenth century, many French Catholic missionaries risked offending Siamese law as they left Siam without permission of the Siamese king. By traditional Siamese law, any people leaving Siam, both the native Siamese and the foreigners, should seek permission from the Siamese royal government first, though they were usually allowed to. Article 7 of this Montigny Treaty stated that any French subjects wishing to leave Siam should be at freedom to do so without the requiring the consent of the Siamese government: Les Français ne pourront être retenus, contre leur volonté, dans le Royaume de Siam, The French cannot be held against their will in the Kingdom of Siam. However, the Siamese government reserved its power to request the French Consul to detain and prevent a specific French subject from leaving Siam.

=== Catholic Church in Siam ===
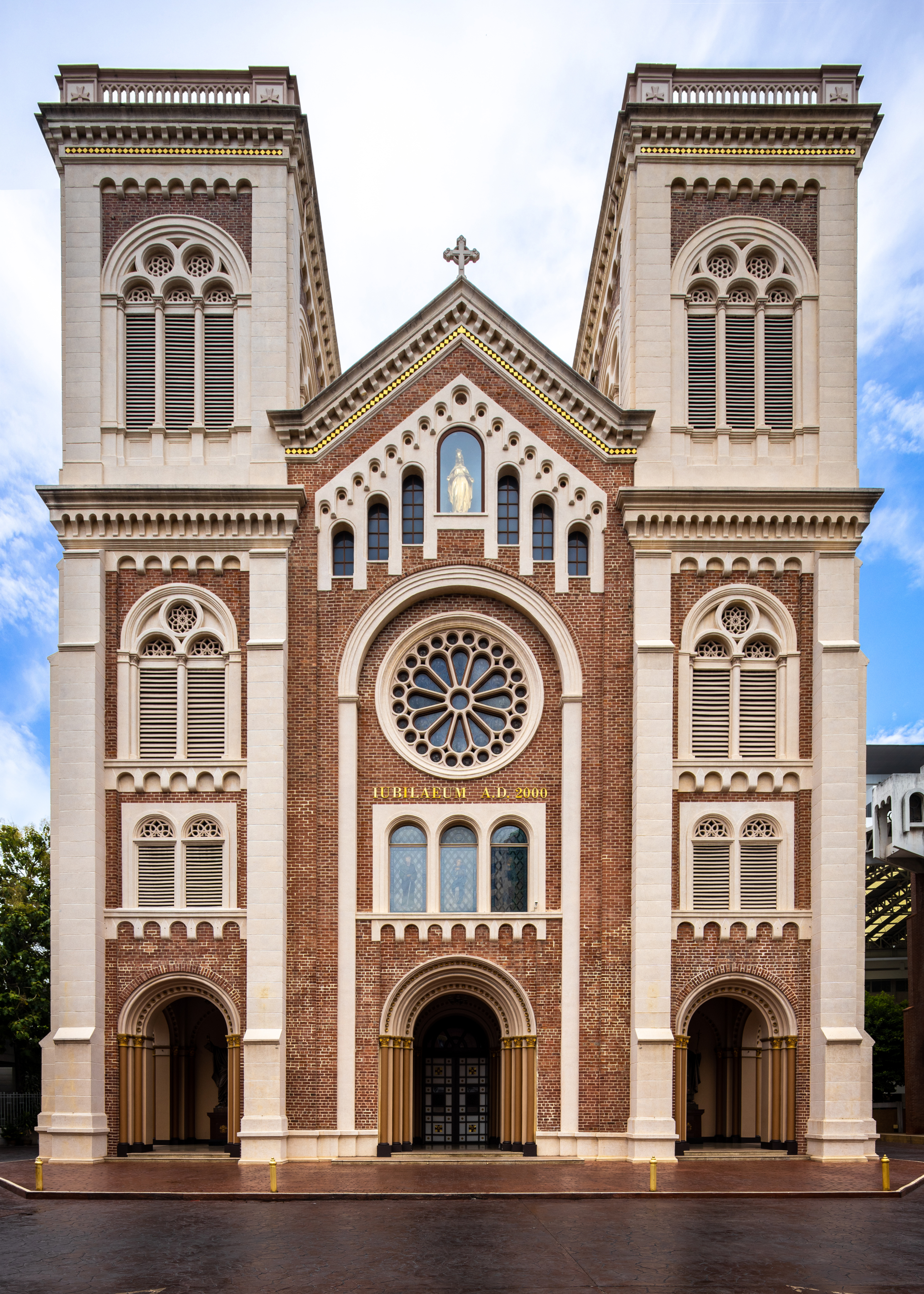
Assumption Church had been the seat of Vicars apostolic of Siam since 1821. The church was the residence of Bishop Pallegoix and the center of Roman Catholic Church in Siam in the nineteenth century. The current church was built in 1910 in Neo-Romanesque style.

Article 3 stipulated the freedom of French subjects to practice their Roman Catholic religion in Siam without persecution. This clause was similar to the treaties allowing the Protestant British and Americans to practice their religion freely in Siam. However, through history, Westerners had always been allowed to practice Christianity in Siam without persecution. The restriction was that, since 1731 in the Ayutthaya period, the Siamese royal court had been banning Catholic missionaries from preaching on and converting the native Siamese, Mon, Northern Thai and Lao people in Siam. French Catholic missionaries could only evangelize on the Cambodians, Chinese and the Vietnamese, who were not included in the law, in Siam. As France had been positioning itself as the champion of the Catholic cause in the Far East, freedom and security of Catholic priests for their works on propagation of faith was a concerning issue for France. Article 3 of this Montigny Treaty also stipulated freedom of Catholic propagation of faith in Siam, thus undoing the Christian conversion ban on native people that had been in place for 125 years.

French Catholic missionaries were allowed to build churches in the areas designated by local Siamese authorities. French missionaries were also allowed to go outside of the twenty-four-hour-journey limit to preach Christianity in Siam's peripheral regions but they had to acquire permission from both the Siamese government and the French Consul beforehand. Montigny assigned the power of issuing permits for French priests to travel in Siam to French consular authority rather than the vicariate authority because of Montigny's personal contempt for Bishop Pallegoix the incumbent Vicar Apostolic of Siam.

Three years after the conclusion of this Montigny Treaty, in January 1859, Isidoro Francisco Guimarães the Portuguese Governor of Macau arrived in Bangkok as the Portuguese envoy to conclude a treaty with Siam. The Catholic Church was a concern for Guimarães because majority of Catholics in Siam were of Asian–Portuguese Mestizo identity. The Portuguese Padroado Mission in Siam had long been superseded by the Paris Foreign Missions Society since the Ayutthaya Period. In the Luso–Siamese Guimarães Treaty, the word "Catholic" was included in the treaty. Guimarães asserted in his treaty that any new churches built by Portugal should be administered by Portuguese priests, a direct challenge to French dominance. However, reestablishment of the Portuguese Padroado Mission in Siam did not actually happen and Siam's Catholic church remained dominated by French missionaries.

Comparison of clauses concerning freedom of Christian religion in Siam
	Franco–Siamese Montigny Treaty (1856)	Luso–Siamese Guimarães Treaty (1859)
Treaty Excerpt	Art. 3. Les sujets français jouiront, dans toute l’étendue du Royaume de Siam, de la faculté de pratiquer leur religion ouvertement et en toute liberté, et de bâtir des églises dans les endroits que l’autorité locale, après s’être concertée avec le consul de France, aura désignés comme pouvant être affectés à ces constructions. Les missionnaires français auront la faculté de prêcher et d’enseigner, de construire des églises, des séminaires ou écoles, des hôpitaux et autres édifices pieux, sur un point quelconque du Royaume de Siam, en se conformant aux lois du pays. Ils voyageront en toute liberté dans toute l’étendue du Royaume, pourvu qu’ils soient porteurs de lettres authentiques du consul de France ou, en son absence, de leur évêque, revêtues du visa du gouverneur général, résidant à Bangkok, dans la juridiction duquel se trouveront les provinces où ils voudront se rendre.	Artigo 8o. Os subditos portuguezes gosarão em todo o Reino de Siam e suas dependencias de inteira liberdade de consciencia conforme os principios da absoluta tolerancia, podendo, como desde remotos tempos lhes foi concedido, cumprir com os seus deveres catholicos, e assistir aos cultos christãos, tanto em suas casas, como nas Igrejas publicas, que poderão livremente construir nos lugares, que as Authoridades siamezas de accordo com o Consul para esse fim destinarem; as quaes Igrejas serão administradas por padres portuguezes, que gosarão de todos os privilegios concedidos aos padres de outras nações europeas, que tem feito Tratados com Siam. Igualmente os subditos siamezes nunca serão molestados nos dominios portuguezes por causa da sua religião, e se observará com elles o mesmo, que se pratica com os de outras nações de differente communhão religiosa.
Translation	Article 3: French subjects shall enjoy, throughout the whole extent of the Kingdom of Siam, the right to practice their religion openly and freely, and to build churches in the places which the local authority, after consultation with the French Consul, shall have designated as suitable for such constructions. French missionaries shall have the right to preach and teach, and to build churches, seminaries or schools, hospitals, and other religious or charitable buildings anywhere in the Kingdom of Siam, while conforming to the laws of the country. They shall travel in complete freedom throughout the whole extent of the Kingdom, provided that they carry authentic letters from the Consul of France, or, in his absence, from their bishop, bearing the visa of the governor-general residing at Bangkok, within whose jurisdiction shall lie the provinces to which they wish to visit.	Article 8: Portuguese subjects shall enjoy, throughout the Kingdom of Siam and its dependencies, complete freedom of conscience in accordance with the principles of absolute tolerance, being able, just as has been granted to them since ancient times, to fulfil their Catholic duties and attend Christian worship both in their homes and in public churches, which they may freely build in places that the Siamese authorities, in agreement with the Consul, shall designate for that purpose. These churches shall be administered by Portuguese priests, who shall enjoy all the privileges granted to the priests of other European nations that have concluded treaties with Siam. Likewise, Siamese subjects shall never be molested in Portuguese dominions because of their religion, and the same shall be observed toward them as is practiced with those of other nations of a different religious communion.

=== Crime and Arrest ===
Siamese Nakhonban police held exclusive power of arrest on both French and Siamese subjects in Siam. When a French subject committed a crime in Siam, it would be the Siamese police not the French consular police who would arrest the French subject suspected of committing a crime and the suspect would be handed over to the French Consul for trial in French law, according to the principle of French extraterritorial jurisdiction in Siam. When a Siamese person committed a crime against a French subject, it would be Siamese police not French consular police who would arrest the Siamese suspect, who would be placed on trial in Siamese judicial system. French consular police could not, in any situations, arrest both French and Siamese subjects in Siam, as in Article 9;

Les Français seront également régis par la loi française pour la répression de tous crimes et délits commis par eux dans le Royaume de Siam. Les coupables seront recherchés et arrêtés par les autorités siamoises, à la dilligence du consul de France, auquel ils devront être remis, et qui se chargera de les faire punir conformément aux lois françaises. Si des Siamois se rendent coupables de délits ou de crimes envers de Français, ils seront arrêtés par l'autorité siamoise et livrés à la sévérité des lois du Royaume.

The French [in Siam] will also be subjected to French law for the repression of all crimes and offenses committed by them in the Kingdom of Siam. Those found guilty will be sought and arrested by the Siamese authorities, at the behest of the French consul, to whom they must be handed over, and who will be responsible for their punishment in accordance with French law. If any Siamese commit offenses or crimes against French citizens [in Siam], they will be arrested by the Siamese authorities and subjected to the full force of the [Siamese] Kingdom's laws.

In practice, however, French consular police usually arrested Siamese people who committed offenses against French subjects in Siam, when the French considered Siam's sentences on the Siamese offenders not in accordance with their demand. Siamese government saw French consular handling of Siamese offenders as arbitrary, leading to deteriorating relationships between French Consuls and the Siamese royal government in the 1860s.

=== French naval access to Bangkok ===
The clauses concerning French naval access to Bangkok, stipulated in Article 15 and Article 16, there were discrepancies between the French and Thai language versions. In the Siamese language version, the French could not directly bring warships to Bangkok, only anchoring at Paknam Samut Prakarn downstream from Bangkok. If the French warship wished to proceed to Bangkok, the responsible French naval commander should ask for permission from the Siamese government first. Then, the Siamese government would assign a designated place for the French warship to anchor. In the French language version, the French were at relative freedom to bring warships to Bangkok, even though they had to inform the Siamese government first but they did not have to 'ask for permission'.

When a French vessel, naval or commercial, was in distress or in need for repair, the French vessel could enter Siamese ports for support and repair. In Siamese language version, any incoming French vessels in need for repair should ask for permission from Siamese government first. Only then Siam would send an inspector to make sure that French vessel was genuinely in need of repair so that the French vessel could proceed to Bangkok for repair. In French language version, however, requirement for Siamese official to inspect the ship was totally not mentioned but instead cooperation from local Siamese authorities to assist the French in repairing French ships was emphasized.

Comparison of French and Thai language versions on the Article 15 and Article 16 of the Montigny Treaty (1856)
	French language version	Thai language version
Article 15	Les bâtiments de guerre de français pourront pénétrer dans le fleuve et jeter l'ancre à Paknam; mais ils devront avertir l'autorité siamoise pour remonter jusqu'a Bangkok, et s'entendre avec elle relativement à l'endroit où ils pourront mouiller.	เรือรบฝรั่งเศสจะเข้ามาทอดอยู่ได้แต่เพียงหน้าด่านเมืองสมุทรปราการ ถ้าจะขึ้นมาถึงกรุงเทพฯ ให้บอกให้เสนาบดีฝ่ายไทยให้รู้ก่อน ท่านเสนาบดีฝ่ายไทยยอมให้ขึ้นมาจอดอยู่ที่ไหน ก็ขึ้นมาจอดได้
Article 15	Translation: French warships may enter the river and anchor at Paknam; but they must notify the Siamese authority before going upriver to Bangkok, and come to an agreement with them regarding where they may anchor.	Translation: French warships are only allowed to anchor off the outskirts of Samut Prakan. If they wish to reach Bangkok, they must inform the Thai minister beforehand. The Thai minister will then grant permission for them to anchor wherever he deems necessary.
Article 16	Si un navires de guerre ou de commerce français en détresse entre dans un port siamois, les autorités locales lui donneront toute faculté pour se réparer, se ravitailler ou continuer son voyage.	ถ้าเรือรบของฝรั่งเศสก็ดี เรือลูกค้าฝรั่งเศสก็ดี ชำรุดควรจะเข้าอู่ ขุนนางในเรือรบฝรั่งเศสจะต้องบอกกับเจ้าพนักงานฝ่ายไทย เจ้าพนักงานฝ่ายไทยเห็นว่าเรือชำรุดจริง ควรจะขึ้นมาเข้าอู่ที่กรุงเทพฯ ก็จะให้ขึ้นมาซ่อมแปลงเข้าอู่ที่กรุงเทพฯ
Article 16	Translation: If a French warship or merchant vessel in distress enters a Siamese port, the local authorities will give it every opportunity to repair itself, resupply or continue its voyage.	Translation: If a French warship, or any French merchant ships, was damaged and needed to be taken to shipyard, the nobleman on the French warship had to inform the Thai officials. If the Thai officials believe the ship is genuinely damaged and should be taken to a shipyard in Bangkok for repairs, then they will allow it to be brought to Bangkok for maintenance.

Interpretation of Article 15 of this Montigny Treaty had serious complications for Siam as France became the only Western nation to bring warships to Bangkok in gunboat diplomacy in 1865 and 1893;

- In 1865, eight years after conclusion of this Montigny Treaty of 1856, Gabriel Aubaret the French Consul in Siam brought gunboat Mitraille to Bangkok in order to force the Siamese government to agree to the Convention of April 1865, in which Siam relinquished all claims over Cambodia, ultimately leading to the Franco–Siamese Treaty of 1867, in which Siam accepted French protectorate over Cambodia.
- In 1893, during the Paknam Incident, 36 years after conclusion of the Montigny Treaty, Auguste Pavie the French Consul in Bangkok, invoking the Article 15 of this Montigny Treaty, brought two French gunboats Inconstant and Comète to Bangkok to pressure Siam, resulting in Siamese cession of all Lao lands east of Mekong to French Indochina.

=== Terms introduced from Whampoa Treaty ===
Apart from the terms taken from the Bowring Treaty, Walewski the French Foreign Minister who drafted this treaty, through Montigny, who had been a part of the mission of Théodose de Lagrené to conclude the Sino–French Treaty of Whampoa of 1844, introduced many clauses from the Whampoa Treaty and the France–Oman Treaty of 1844 into this Franco–Siamese Montigny Treaty, greatly expanding the details of treaty into twenty-four articles, in comparison to the Anglo–Siamese Bowring Treaty, which contained only twelve articles and the American–Siamese Harris Treaty, which also contained twelve articles. The terms that originated from the Whampoa Treaty included;

- Article 4: Any French petitions, claims or accusations against the Siamese should go through the French Consul first, who would make sure the complaints were reasonable and properly written before forwarding to the Siamese government. This was taken from the Article 33 of the Whampoa Treaty, in which any French complaints on the Chinese government should go through the French Consul.
- Article 6: The French legation in Siam were allowed to hire local Siamese people as employees. This was taken from Whampoa Treaty Article 24, which stipulated that the French could hire Chinese people as employees.
- Article 8: The Siamese government had no authorities over any French ships nor vessels in Siam. This was taken from Whampoa Article 28, in which the Chinese did not have any authorities over French merchant ships in China.
- Article 29 of the Whampoa Treaty stated that, if any French ships were plundered in the Chinese Seas, the Chinese authorities were obliged to strive their best to apprehend the perpetrator and to retrieve the stolen goods. Failure to do so accorded punishments on the responsible Chinese officials. Montigny took this article into Article 10 but added that if the French were looted or plundered in Siamese territories, both on land and at sea, the Siamese authorities should arrest the perpetrator and retrieve the valuables but failure to do so did not accord punishments on nor compensations from the responisible Siamese officials.
- Both China (Whampoa Article 31) and Siam (Montigny Article 11) were required to assist the French in recovering French deserters and fugitives and both should not shelter such people.

Some articles were also taken from the France–Oman Treaty of 1844, negotiated by French naval commander Romain Desfossés with the Omani Empire;

- If any Omani (Desfossés Article 9), Chinese (Whampoa Article 10) or Siamese (Montigny Article 13) people were indebted to French subjects and did not pay the debts, Omani, Chinese and Siamese governments were to assist the French creditors to recover payments. Conversely, French Consuls would also assist any Omani, Chinese and Siamese claimants against French debtors.
- Local Omani (Desfossés Article 15), Chinese (Whampoa Article 30) and Siamese (Montigny Article 16) authorities were required to assist in cases of French shipwrecks or any French vessels in need of supplies and repairs.
- If a French subject became bankrupt in Oman (Desfossés Article 8) or in Siam (Montigny Article 12), the French Consuls in respective polities shall take possession of all the property of such bankrupt person to be delivered and distributed to the creditors.
- If a French subject died in Oman (Desfossés Article 7) or in Siam (Montigny Article 14), property of such deceased person would be inherited by rightful heirs according to the will or, if not possible, to the French consular authorities in respective polities.

The expanded articles of this Franco–Siamese Treaty of 1856 served as the model for all of Siam's subsequent unequal treaties with other Western nations including the Danish–Siamese Jarvie Treaty of 1858, which contained 25 articles, the Luso–Siamese Guimarães Treaty of 1859, which contained 39 articles, the Dutch–Siamese Curtius Treaty of 1860, which contained 25 articles and the Prusso–Siamese Eulenburg Treaty of 1862, which contained 25 articles.

== Consequences and Subsequent Events ==
=== Montigny's mission in Cambodia and Vietnam ===
Charles de Montigny the French imperial plenipotentiary appointed by Emperor Napoleon III arrived in Siam in early July 1856, concluding the Franco–Siamese Treaty in August 1856 and staying in Siam for the total of two months and a half until his departure. In his diplomatic mission to Southeast Asia, Montigny was not only assigned to Siam but also commissioned to go to Cambodia and Vietnam. Cambodia under King Ang Duong had been under joint Siamese–Vietnamese suzerainty in the aftermath of the Siamese–Vietnamese War, paying tributes to both. Previously, in 1853, Ang Duong, through Bishop Jean-Claude Miche the Apostolic Vicar of Cambodia, had sent Cambodian merchandise to Frédéric Gauthier the French Consul in Singapore in efforts to procure relations with France. Gauthier sent these gifts to France, ending up in Toulon in Southern France but the French government could not find these Cambodian gifts and considered them lost.

During his stay in Bangkok, Montigny asked King Mongkut about Cambodia and Vietnam. This made the Siamese aware of Ang Duong's earlier attempt to enter relations with France without Siam's consent. In Cambodia, in a side mission, Montigny was only to inform the Cambodian king Ang Duong that his earlier Cambodian gifts to the French government had lost. For Vietnam, which was his main objective, Montigny was to tell the Vietnamese court that the French Emperor was unhappy about Vietnam's Christian persecutions and to conclude a commercial and religious treaty with Vietnam in similar manner to Siam.

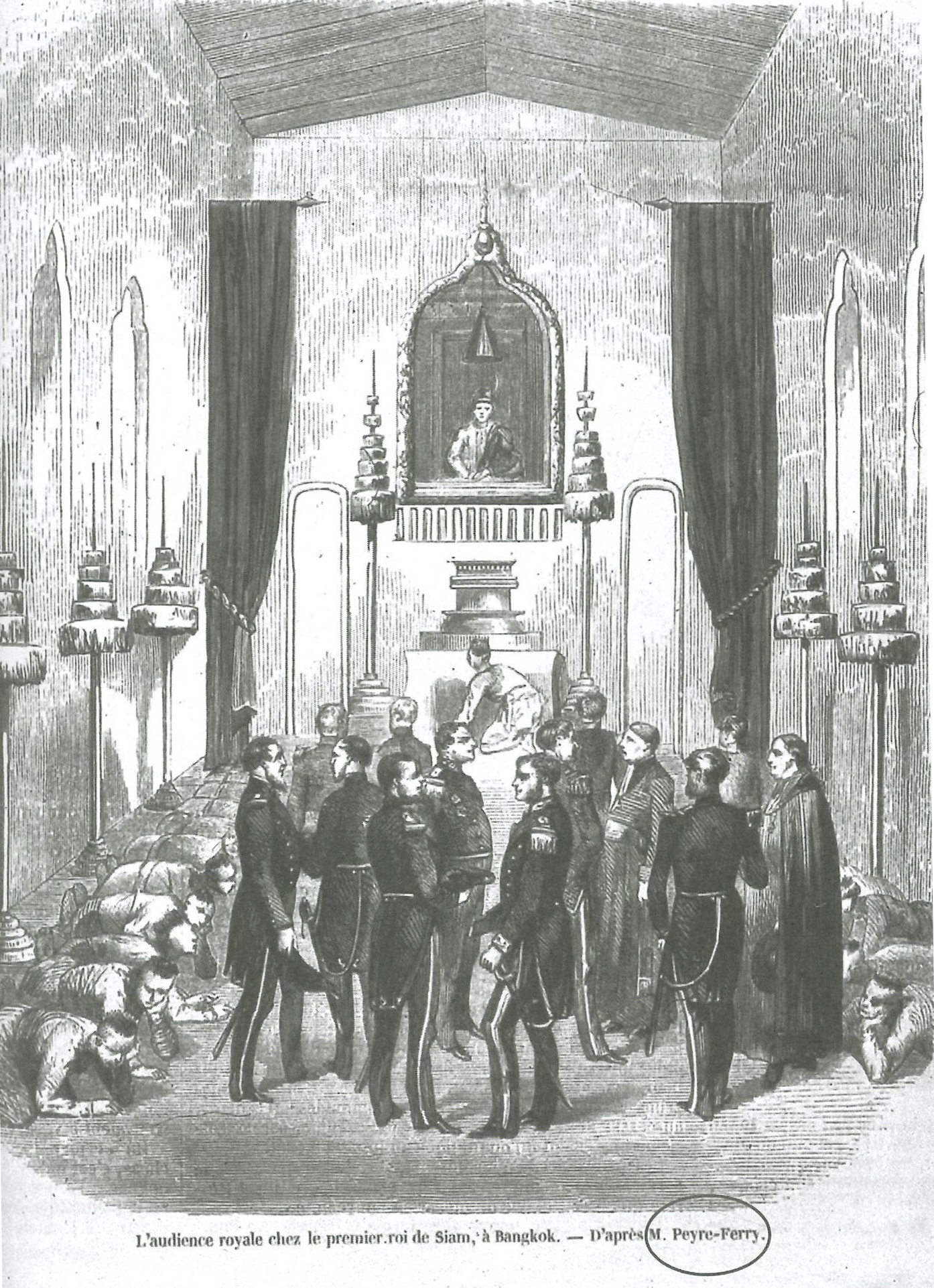
Depiction of Charles de Montigny having audience with Siamese king Mongkut, published on L'Illustration in 1857

On 19 September 1856, Montigny had a farewell audience with King Mongkut of Siam, during which the Siamese king entrusted Montigny with his gilded royal letter to the French Emperor. Mongkut also granted, per Montigny's request, a number of exotic wild animals to France for display including two elephants, a tapir, a gaur, a serow, a gibbon, a peacock, etc. However, these animals could not be transported immediately and they had to wait for France to send a separate ship to carry them. Montigny and his retinue; Captain Jules Collier on the Capricieuse and Montigny on the Marceau, left Samut Prakarn on 21 September 1856, sailing eastwards. The Siamese prince Kromma Luang Wongsathirat Sanit, younger half-brother of Mongkut, had Collier take nine Khmer men from Bangkok to return to Cambodia.

Somehow, among these nine Cambodians on the Capricieuse were three Siamese officials. As Montigny was running late on his schedule, Collier decided to leave Cambodia for Vietnam with the Capricieuse, leaving Montigny in Cambodia. Upon disembarkation at Kampot, the two disguised Siamese officials went to Oudong to deliver Mongkut's letter to Ang Duong, while the other one stayed in Kampot to spy on Montigny. This Siamese official in Kampot threatened the Cambodian officials in Kampot not to cooperate with the French.

Montigny on the Marceau arrived in Kampot, the seaport of Southwestern Cambodia, in early October 1856. Montigny was received by Bishop Jean-Claude Miche, who warned Montigny about the Siamese "spy" in Kampot. Montigny summoned the Siamese official and recognized that he had seen this Siamese man before during one of his audiences with Prince Kromma Luang Wongsa in Bangkok. Montigny was convinced that Siam intended to monitor his actions in Cambodia. Montigny then expelled this Siamese official from Kampot.

At their own initiatives, Montigny and Bishop Miche proposed a Franco–Cambodian Treaty to guarantee Catholic religious freedom in Cambodia. Even though Montigny recognized Siam's suzerainty over Cambodia, Montigny thought that Cambodia could independently sign a treaty with France without Siam's consent. King Ang Duong was departing from Oudong the Cambodian royal capital to meet Montigny in Kampot when Phra Ratchathani, called "Mi Muang Thip raj dhany", the chief Siamese official among the three, arrived in Oudong to deliver Mongkut's letter. In the letter, Mongkut granted permission for Ang Duong to conclude a treaty with France, given that the treaty terms were appropriate, also sending a copy of the recently concluded Franco–Siamese Montigny Treaty for Ang Duong to examine. Also in the letter, Mongkut was aware of Ang Duong's earlier secret endeavor with the French Consul in Singapore. After reading Mongkut's letter, Ang Duong decided not to go to meet Montigny in Kampot.

Montigny and Bishop Miche had been waiting for Ang Duong in Kampot when the Cambodian king sent his fifteen ministers, officials and two hundred elephants to fetch Montigny to Oudong instead, citing his sudden illness as the cause of his inability to arrive in Kampot. According to Bishop Miche, however, Ang Duong was not ill but was prevented by the Siamese from coming to meet Montigny. Montigny refused to go to meet Ang Duong at Oudong for he had already been late in his schedule to reach Vietnam and he was supposed to spend very little time in Cambodia. Journey from Kampot to Oudong was arduous, going through thick forests and muddy roads. As Montigny refused to go to Oudong, Ang Duong assigned Bishop Miche as the Cambodian plenipotentiary to negotiate a treaty with Montigny. Montigny and Miche then drafted the fourteen-article Franco–Cambodian Commercial and Religious Convention (French: Convention Commerciale et Religieuse), which largely contained the same provisions as the preceding treaty Montigny had just concluded with Siam but with less details.

As Montigny required Bishop Miche to be his interpreter in his Vietnamese mission, Montigny assigned the 26-year-old inexperienced French MEP missionary Arsène Hestrest to bring Montigny's Cambodian Treaty draft for Ang Duong to sign at Oudong. Montigny and Bishop Miche hurriedly left Kampot on the Marceau in late October 1856, going to Danang. However, strong seasonal northeastern winds prevented Montigny and the Marceau from proceeding directly to Danang, instead having to circumvent through Singapore, Labuan, Borneo and Manila in order to reach Danang. Meanwhile, in late November 1856, Hestrest presented Montigny's treaty draft to Ang Duong and found that the Cambodian king was closely watched by the presenting Siamese officials including Phra Ratchathani and Luang Aphai, son of the Siam-appointed governor of Battambang. Ang Duong rejected Montigny's treaty, refusing to listen to any explanations from Hestrest and expressing his anger that Montigny did not come to see him in person. Captain Collier of the Capricieuse had been waiting for Montigny's arrival in Danang for three months.

After three months of wandering at sea, Montigny on the Marceau finally arrived in Danang in late January 1857. In Danang, Montigny adopted a tough stance on the Vietnamese, threatening that if Vietnam did not comply to French demands, France would be obliged to intervened militarily. Montigny's threats did not incur fear among the Vietnamese, who responded that if France wanted to fight, Vietnam would fight. After some conflicts, the negotiation took place in early February 1857. The Vietnamese insisted that the French merchants could only come to trade in Danang in a limited time period, to which Montigny countered that, in the same manner as the unequal treaties that Western nations had forced upon Asian nations, the French should be allowed to trade freely in any Vietnamese ports and build Christian churches in any Vietnamese towns. The negotiation broke down as both sides refused to find a compromising ground. Montigny departed from Danang in early February 1857 empty-handed, after only a short stay, without achieving his assigned objective in Vietnam, thus ending his seven-month diplomatic mission among the Southeast Asian polities of Siam, Cambodia and Vietnam.

=== Ratification of Franco–Siamese Montigny Treaty ===
Bishop Jean-Baptiste Pallegoix the Apostolic Vicar of Eastern Siam, also a close friend of the Siamese king Mongkut, put forward himself as a candidate as the French Consul in Siam. However, Montigny the French plenipotentiary took a negative view on Bishop Pallegoix due to the earlier incident. Instead, before his departure from Siam in September 1856, Montigny appointed the Portuguese Consul in Bangkok António Frederico Moor as gérant or interim manager of French Consulate in Siam due to shortage of French diplomatic personnel in the Far East. France and Portugal, fellow Catholic nations, had an agreement that, in case where any of the two nations, France or Portugal, lacked representatives, French or Portuguese Consul would oversee the nationals of the other nation. Portugal had been allowed to have Consulate in Bangkok since the Luso–Siamese Agreement of 1820 but the Portuguese Consuls were not yet accorded with extraterritorial jurisdiction, while the French Consul had already been granted such privileges by the Montigny Treaty. The Siamese saw the Portuguese Consul Moor as a merchant from a 'small nation' and was upset by Montigny's decision, viewing French appointment of a Portuguese Consul as France not caring about Siam.

After the conclusion of Montigny's mission, Ernest-Napoléon Godeaux, Montigny's young assistant, brought Mongkut's gilded letter to Emperor Napoleon III and the Franco–Siamese Treaty to Paris for ratification, where the French Foreign Ministry quickly approved Montigny's Siamese Treaty in February 1857. Montigny and Bishop Miche returned to Singapore in mid-March 1857, where they learned, through Hestrest's letter, that King Ang Duong of Cambodia had rejected Montigny's treaty. Angered, Montigny wrote a letter in March 1857 to confront the Siamese king Mongkut about the incident, accusing Siam of having prevented Ang Duong from accepting Montigny's treaty. In the letter, Montigny told Mongkut about the insolence of the Siamese spy and how he had recognized this official as being under the service of Prince Wongsa. The Siamese, however, saw Montigny's accusation as untrue, as King Mongkut had earlier granted permission for Cambodia to conclude a treaty with France. The Siamese saw their own watchful assistance to Cambodia, a vassal of Siam, in dealings with the French envoy as rightful.

With the death of British Consul in Bangkok Charles Hillier in October 1856, the British sent William Raymond Gingell as acting British Consul, who was received with solemn ceremonies by the Siamese court for the Siamese had a positive impression on Queen Victoria's letter to King Mongkut. As Siam had signed a commercial treaty with France, French merchant ships came to trade in Bangkok. Dominique Rémi, a French merchant and Montigny's aide from Shanghai, came to rent a place in Bangkok for his Remi Schmidt & Co company to trade, also acting as Montigny's agent in Bangkok. Rémi reported to Montigny in Singapore that, since signing of Siam's treaties with Britain, France and the United States, hundreds of Western merchants vessels had come to trade in Bangkok, among them only six were French. They were the Benjamin and the Lion from Bordeaux, the Pur-Sang and the Concorde from Nantes, the Guillaume Tell from Le Havre and the Émilie from Marseilles.

Montigny eventually returned to resume his position as the French Consul in Shanghai in June 1857, after four years of absence. On 10 June 1857, Count Walewski the French Foreign Minister appointed Auguste Heurtier, younger brother of the French Councillor of State Nicolas Heurtier, to be the new gérant or manager of French Consulate in Siam. However, journey of Heurtier from France to Siam took time. Siamese king Mongkut had been planning to send diplomatic missions to Paris and London. As Siam did not possess marine vessels strong enough to travel to Europe, the Siamese had to rely on Western steamships for the missions. In one of the audiences, Montigny had promised Mongkut that a French vessel would arrive to fetch Siamese envoys to France. However, the British would not let the French supersede them. In July 1857, British screw sloop HMS Encounter arrived in Bangkok, much to the delight of Mongkut. HMS Encounter took the Siamese envoys to London, leaving Bangkok in the same month. Mongkut also expected France to honor Siam in the same way that Britain had done.

In mid-July 1857, the French merchant ship Aigle from Marseilles arrived in Bangkok, also bringing the Franco–Siamese Treaty concluded last year in August 1856, ratified by the French government in February 1857, to be ratified on the Siamese side. As the Siamese king Mongkut had sent his gilded letter to the French Emperor, he had been expecting a response. France sending the ratified treaty by mail on a merchant ship without an official envoy and without a response letter from the French Emperor was an insult to Siam's national prestige. The incident put France in direct comparison with Britain, who had been attending to Siam's requests. Earlier, in March 1856, Harry Parkes the British envoy arrived in Siam for ratification of the Bowring Treaty with a letter from Queen Victoria to the two Siamese kings. Charles W. Bradley the American Consul at Ningpo also arrived in Siam in June 1857 on USS Portsmouth for ratification of the American–Siamese Harris Treaty concluded earlier in May 1856.

When the Portuguese Consul Moor, the manager of French Consulate in Siam, presented the treaty to King Mongkut on July 23, Mongkut refused to ratify the treaty, saying that France should not send the treaty for ratification by simple mail but rather with more solemnity with an envoy on a state vessel. This incident detoriorated the Franco–Siamese relations. Prince Wongsa told Rémi that France had humiliated Siam. Rémi reported this incident to Montigny at Shanghai. King Mongkut eventually ratified the Franco–Siamese Montigny Treaty on 24 August 1857 but the Siamese contempt was not resolved. Montigny wrote to Walewski in August 1857; "Our interests and influence are in grave peril in Siam", reminding Walewski that France had commercial stake in Siam because French merchant ships had come to trade in Siam in the numbers that had not even been realized in China and deploring Walewski to have the French Emperor respond to Mongkut's letter.

=== Franco–Siamese relations after Montigny Treaty ===
Through 1857, the French were ramping up their naval forces in the China Seas in preparation for wars against China (Second Opium War) and Vietnam (Siege of Tourane, 1858). Auguste Heurtier the new manager of French Consulate in Siam arrived in Singapore in early September 1857 but Heurtier was told by Frédéric Gauthier the French Consul in Singapore that the King of Siam was angry at recent French diplomatic gestures towards Siam. Heurtier then decided to wait in Singapore for three months until he eventually decided to enter Siam in December 1857. King Mongkut greeted Heurtier, who did not even bring a letter from the French Foreign Ministry with him, with a very cold reception as a private citizen without any gun salutes, even though Bishop Pallegoix, a friend of Mongkut, introduced Heurtier in the audience, in contrast to the British Consul Gingell, who had been received with great pomp.

Walewski managed to get the French Emperor Napoleon III to write a reply letter to the two kings of Siam, which Walewski sent off from France in December 1857 with more gifts. According to Article 2 of the Montigny Treaty, for an appointed consul to rightfully assume his position in Siam, an exequatur from the Siamese king was required. However, one month had passed since his arrival and Mongkut had not yet granted the exequatur. Heurtier requested to return to France in late December, citing illness. Facing such ill treatments, Heurtier threatened to leave. Only then Mongkut granted Heurtier the due exequatur in January 1858 to be the acting French Consul in Siam. Napoleon's letter eventually arrived in Bangkok in March 1858. The French imperial letter was presented by Heurtier to King Mongkut with Bishop Pallegoix as interpreter. In the letter, Napoleon III promised to send a state warship to bring Siamese envoys to France. Eventual arrival of the French imperial letter placated the discontent of the Siamese king to some degree for a time being.

John Jarvie, a Scottish merchant from Singapore, also acting as the Danish Consul in Singapore, arrived in Siam to conclude, on behalf of Denmark, the Danish–Siamese Treaty, another Bowring-type unequal treaty, in May 1858. This Danish–Siamese Jarvie Treaty contained twenty-five articles, which were mostly the same as the preceding Franco–Siamese Montigny Treaty of 1856. As Heurtier returned to France, the French Foreign Ministry sent Charles François Pavion as the new gérant or manager of French Consulate.

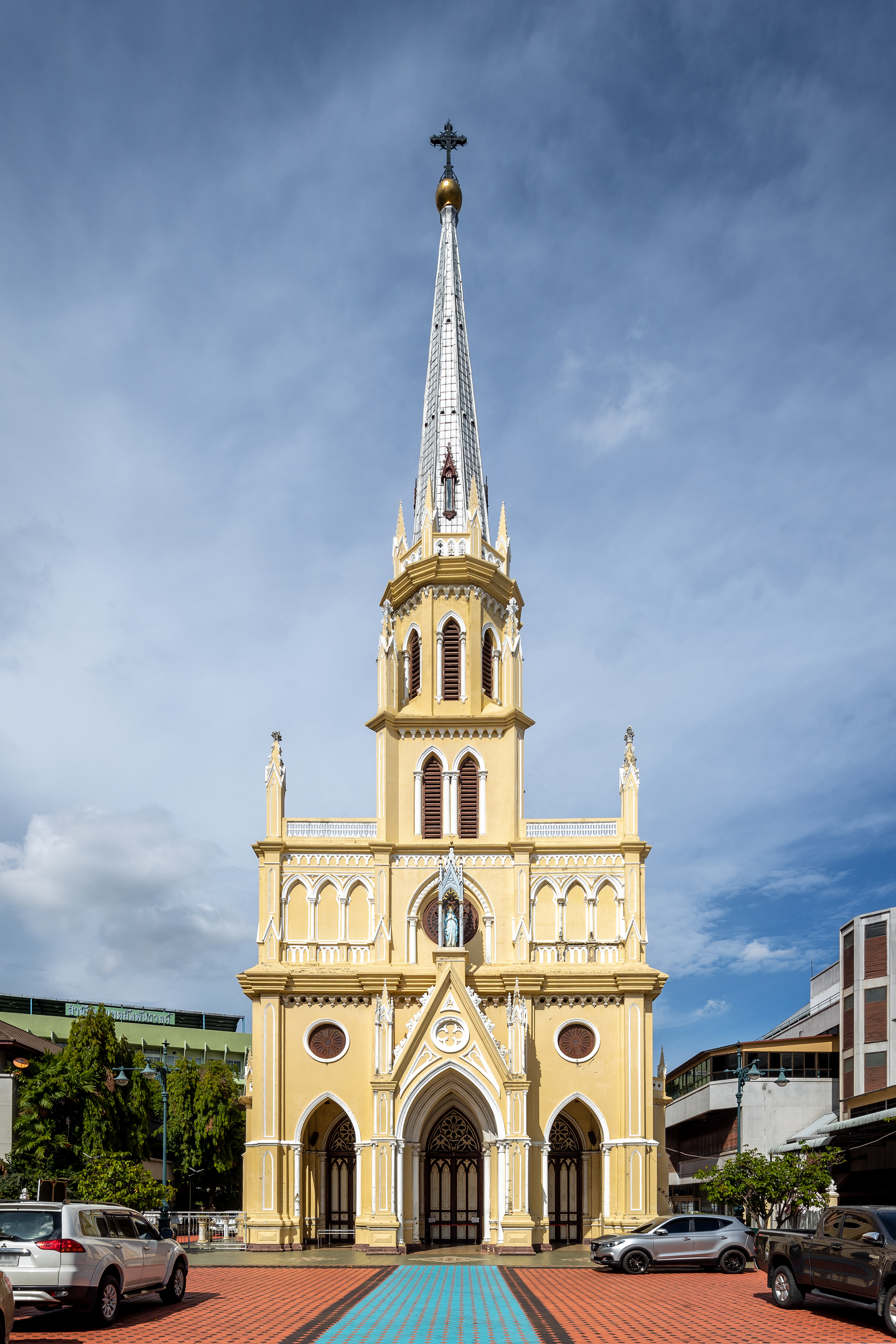
In October 1858, a Thai Christian man was persecuted for unauthorized fireworks during a Catholic celebration at Holy Rosary Church, causing Siam to cede a plot of land to the Catholic Mission.

In October 1858, the Holy Rosary Church in Bangkok celebrated the Patronal Feast, which included fireworks. However, the Siamese Catholic headman of the church named Klom failed to procure permission from the Siamese government to ignite the fireworks beforehand. The Siamese police came to arrest Klom at the Holy Rosary Church during the Catholic Mass. Klom was punished with fifty lashes of rattan cane in front of the Holy Rosary Church and was then shamefully paraded in his injured state through the crowds. French missionaries in Bangkok were extremely displeased with this punishment on a Siamese Christian by royal orders. Even Bishop Pallegoix, who had always been sympathetic to Siam, saw this sentence as excessive, considering it as an insult to the Catholic Church. Pallegoix gathered signatures of the French missionaries in Bangkok and handed a petitioned protest to the French Consulate Manager Pavion.

Consulate Manager Pavion brought the complaint to Phrakhlang Kham Bunnag the Siamese Foreign Minister, pointing out that Siam had violated Article 6 of the Montigny Treaty, which stated that any Siamese employed under French services would be protected by French authorities. Pavion demanded that Klom should be immediately released and the land where Klom had been whipped should be ceded to the French Catholic Mission. Four Siamese commissioners; Prince Wongsa, Kalahom Chuang Bunnag, Phrakhlang Kham Bunnag and Chaophraya Yommaraj decided to concede to all of French demands.

The Siamese were again upset that the French government kept sending gérant or Consulate Managers to Siam, whom the Siamese considered of inferior ranks, not full-honorary official Consuls. Eventually, Count of Castelnau arrived in October 1858 as the first-ever official French Consul to Siam. The Siamese government received Consul Castelnau with propriety on par with the British Consul Robert Schomburgk only because of Castelnau's persistence. According to Article 9 of the Montigny Treaty, only the Siamese Nakhonban police could arrest offenders, both native and French. French consular authorities could not, under any circumstances, make arrests. When a gang of Chinese coolies plundered the French legation, Siamese police only captured a few of them and they were soon released. Castelnau found Siam's punishment of these Chinese gangsters inadequate so he sent his own police to arrest the Chinese perpetrators, demanding more severe sentences. Siamese government found actions of French consular police arbitrary and not conforming to the established treaty terms.

As Siam had opened itself to Western trade, more Westerners came to Siam but only four Western nations, namely Britain, France, the United States and Denmark, had already made treaties concerning extraterritorial jurisdiction with Siam. The Siamese government was concerned that any other Westerners, whose countries of origin had not yet concluded treaties with Siam, were subjected to traditional Siamese law. Castelnau secured the release of some Spanish and Italian men from the Siamese prison. The Spanish Consul in Macau asked Castelnau to protect Spanish subjects in Siam. Consul Castelnau then arbitrarily extended his jurisdiction over all Southern European Catholics in Siam, except for Portugal. French–Portuguese rivalry over Catholic jurisdiction in Southeast Asia had been going on since the seventeenth century. Paris Foreign Missions Society had long prevailed over the preceding Portuguese Padroado Mission in Siam, which had been obsolete, even though majority of the Catholics in Siam then were of mixed Luso–Asian identity.

Earlier, the French historian Auguste-Alphonse Étienne-Gallois wrote an article The Siam Expedition in the Seventeenth Century (French: L’Expédition de Siam au XVIIe siècle), which was published in 1853 on Le Moniteur universel, discussing the Franco–Siamese diplomatic relations in the seventeenth century. The article related that King Louis XIV had intended to conquer Siam and to convert King Narai to Catholicism. This article in French language somehow found its way to the Siamese king Mongkut in 1858. King Mongkut was curious and asked Bishop Pallegoix to translate the article for him to read. The French Consul Castelnau was at a loss to know how such academic article that portrayed France in negative light came to Bangkok. Pallegoix came up with an incomplete translation for Mongkut to read, leaving out the French plan to seize control of Siam. However, the American missionaries provided Mongkut with full translation of this article anyway, affecting the Siamese attitude towards France.

Isidoro Francisco Guimarães the Governor of Macau arrived in Bangkok in January 1859 as the Portuguese delegate to conclude the Bowring-type Luso–Siamese Treaty, which was signed in February. The issue of Catholic Church was also a primary concern for Guimarães, owing to the presence of a large number of Luso–Asian Mestizo Catholics in Siam. In similar manner to Article 3 of the Montigny Treaty, the Article 8 of this Guimarães Treaty stipulated Catholic religious freedom in Siam. Guimarães included the word "Catholic" into his treaty. French Consul Castelnau claimed that he successfully thwarted the Portuguese attempt to challenge French dominance over Catholic Church in Siam.
