= Treaty of Friendship, Commerce and Navigation between Siam and Japan =

- Signed: February 25, 1897
- Location: Bangkok
- Expiration: March 10, 1923
- Signatories: (Empire of Japan) Inagaki Manjirō; (Thailand) Devawongse Varoprakar
- Parties: Empire of Japan; (Thailand) Kingdom of Siam
- Language: th, jp, en

Treaty of Friendship, Commerce and Navigation between Siam and Japan (Thai: สนธิสัญญาทางไมตรีพาณิชย์และการเดินเรือระหว่างสยามและญี่ปุ่น พ.ศ. 2440) is a treaty that was concluded on February 25, 1898, between the Empire of Japan, during the Meiji era under Emperor Meiji, and the Kingdom of Siam, during the Rattanakosin period under Chulalongkorn. Japan was represented by its Minister Resident to Siam, Inagaki Manjirō, while Siam was represented by Devawongse Varoprakar. Under this treaty, both Japan and Siam granted each other most favoured nation status. Siam granted Japan low import tariffs and extraterritoriality, consistent with the privileges it had previously accorded to other Western powers.

The Treaty of Friendship, Commerce and Navigation between Siam and Japan marked a significant milestone in Siam's renegotiation to abolish extraterritoriality, as it was the first treaty to include an expiration clause. In contrast, other unequal treaties that Siam had previously signed with Western powers lacked any defined duration or termination date.

== Background and Prelude ==
=== Siam's unequal treaties with Western powers ===
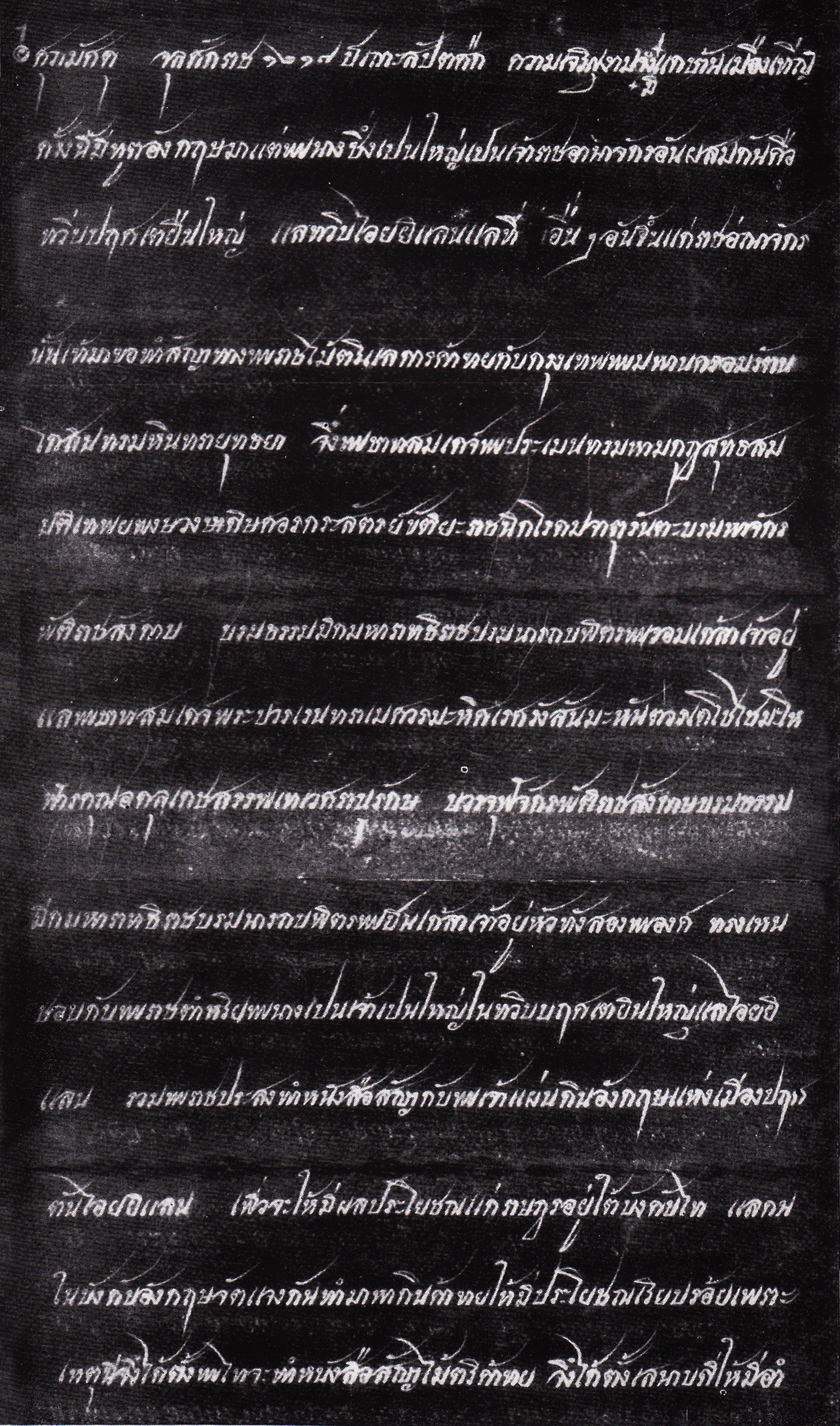
The Bowring Treaty marked the onset of Siam granting extraterritoriality to Western powers

The Siamese law enforced during the Rattanakosin period was the Three Seals Law, inherited from the Ayutthaya Kingdom. Criminal punishments under the Three Seals Law were severe compared to modern standards. Penalties under the public criminal code included decapitation with asset forfeiture, amputation of hands and feet, indefinite imprisonment, and flogging with rattan whips. Trial processes utilized trial by ordeal, such as submersion under water or walking through fire. Criminal investigations employed the Charit Nakhonban (metropolitan customary law), which permitted the torture of suspects through methods like inserting needles under fingernails, compressing the temples, or placing a suspect inside a rattan ball to be kicked by an elephant.

Mongkut recognized that Siam was compelled to conclude a commercial treaty with Britain in order to avert British military threats, a view shared by Chaophraya Sri Suriyawongse. John Bowring, the Governor of Hong Kong, and Harry Parkes, the British representative, arrived in Bangkok in 1855, leading to the conclusion of the Bowring Treaty. Siam agreed to reduce import tariffs for Britain to just three percent and granted Britain extraterritoriality, meaning that British subjects in Siam were exempted from the jurisdiction of Siamese courts and laws. Instead, they were tried in a British consular court, which adjudicated cases using British law. This stemmed from the Western view that Siamese law was cruel, archaic, and incompatible with Western legal principles, leading Westerners to refuse to submit to Siamese laws and courts.

Harry Parkes brought the draft treaty to present to the British government in London, where the government revised it and proposed several additional clauses. Parkes subsequently returned to Bangkok with the amended clauses in 1856. During Parkes' stay in Bangkok, Townsend Harris, the American envoy en route to Japan, arrived in the city in 1856 to negotiate a similar agreement with Siam. This led to the conclusion of the Harris Treaty between Siam and the United States later that year, under which Siam granted the United States low import tariffs and extraterritorial jurisdiction. Six weeks later, Charles de Montigny, the French envoy, also arrived in Bangkok in 1856 to conclude a treaty, under which Siam granted France low import tariffs and extraterritoriality. Subsequently, Siam signed similar agreements with other European nations, including Denmark, Portugal, the Netherlands, and Prussia. These accords were considered unequal treaties, as they caused Siam to lose its fiscal sovereignty and independence in tax collection—thereby reducing the revenue of the royal treasury—while the granting of extraterritoriality resulted in a loss of judicial autonomy.

=== Japan's unequal treaties with Western powers ===
The legal system of the Japanese court was the Ritsuryō, a framework modeled after Chinese law and adopted during the Asuka period. However, as the imperial court lost power and the bakufu (shogunate) assumed control, the Ritsuryō ceased to be effectively enforced. In 1615, Tokugawa Ieyasu, the first shogun of the Tokugawa shogunate, promulgated the Buke-shohatto, a legal code governing the samurai class. Nevertheless, the central shogunate did not enact laws concerning commerce or agriculture for the commoners; instead, the daimyo (feudal lords) established trade and agricultural regulations within their own domains, leading to regional variations in the law. Criminal punishments in customary Japanese law were severe, with capital punishment frequently applied. This was particularly true for the samurai class, who faced ritual suicide by seppuku as a penalty. Furthermore, if a commoner or lower-ranking individual insulted the honor of a samurai or a superior, the samurai was legally permitted to execute the offender on the spot. Similarly, if a husband caught his wife committing adultery, he had the legal right to kill her immediately.

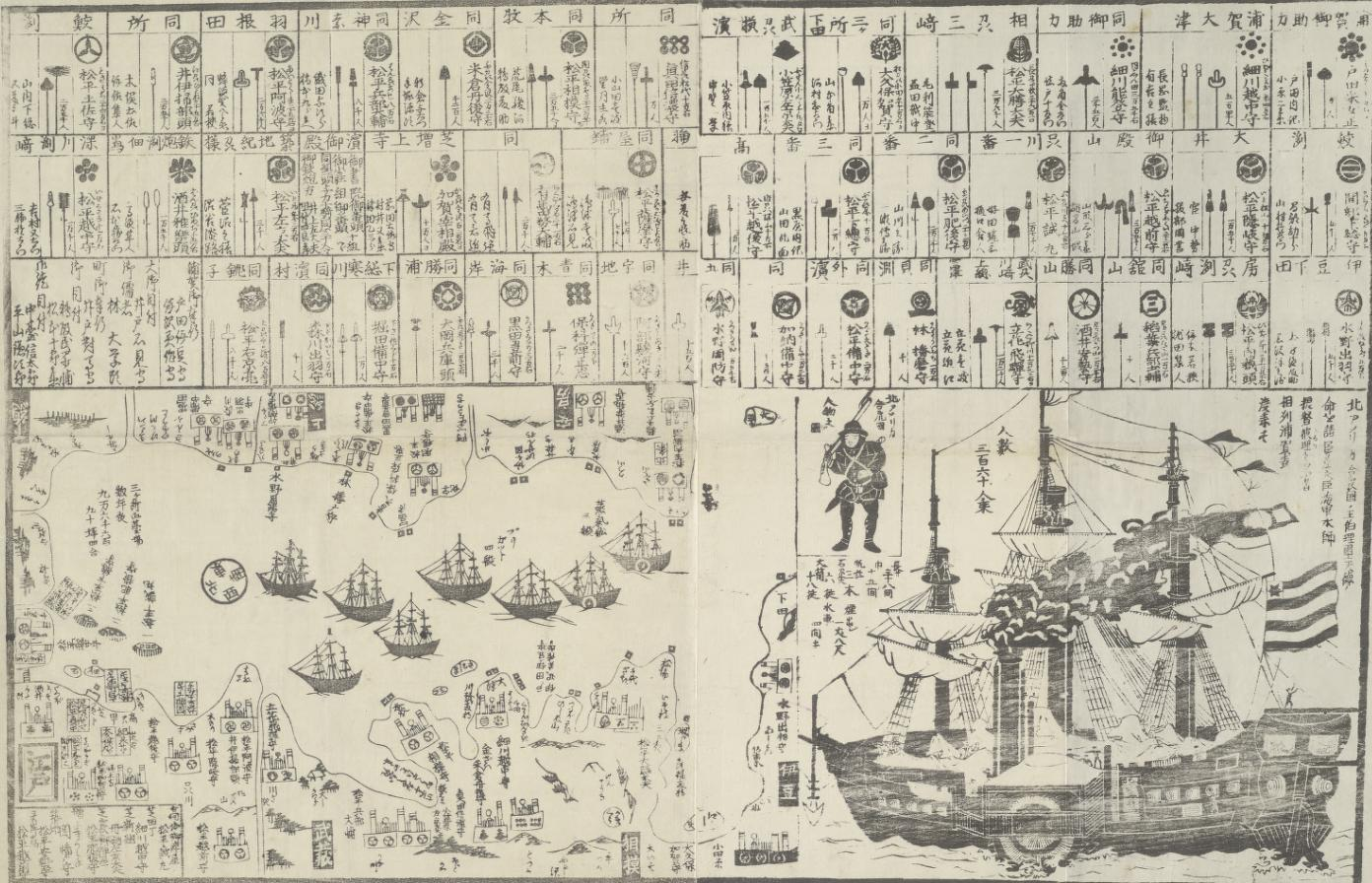
Japanese prints of the Black Ships or gunboats of Commodore Matthew C. Perry, which entered Edo in 1853 to compel Japan to end its isolationist policy and open its ports to commerce

Since 1633, during the shogunate of Tokugawa Iemitsu, Japan pursued an isolationist policy known as Sakoku, severing ties with foreign nations. This lasted until the Bakumatsu period (the late Edo period) in 1853, when Commodore Matthew C. Perry arrived at Uraga Harbor near Edo with gunboats—termed "Black Ships" by the Japanese—to compel the shogunate to open the country for trade with the United States. The following year, in 1854, Perry concluded the Convention of Kanagawa with the shogunate, in which the government agreed to open treaty ports to American commerce, effectively ending Japan's isolation. Townsend Harris departed Bangkok and arrived in Japan in 1858, leading to the conclusion of the Harris Treaty. Under this agreement, the shogunate granted extraterritoriality to American citizens residing within designated port areas, making it the first unequal treaty Japan signed with a Western power. Subsequently, the shogunate signed similar treaties with other Western nations, including Britain, Russia, the Netherlands, and France. Collectively known as the Ansei Treaties, these accords allowed Western powers to establish consular courts in Japan. Consequently, Western nationals were exempted from Japanese law and instead subject to the jurisdiction of their respective consular courts when legal disputes arose, as Westerners viewed Japanese legal codes as cruel and brutal, akin to those of other Asian empires. Furthermore, the shogunate entered into joint agreements with these Western powers to reduce import tariffs to just five percent.

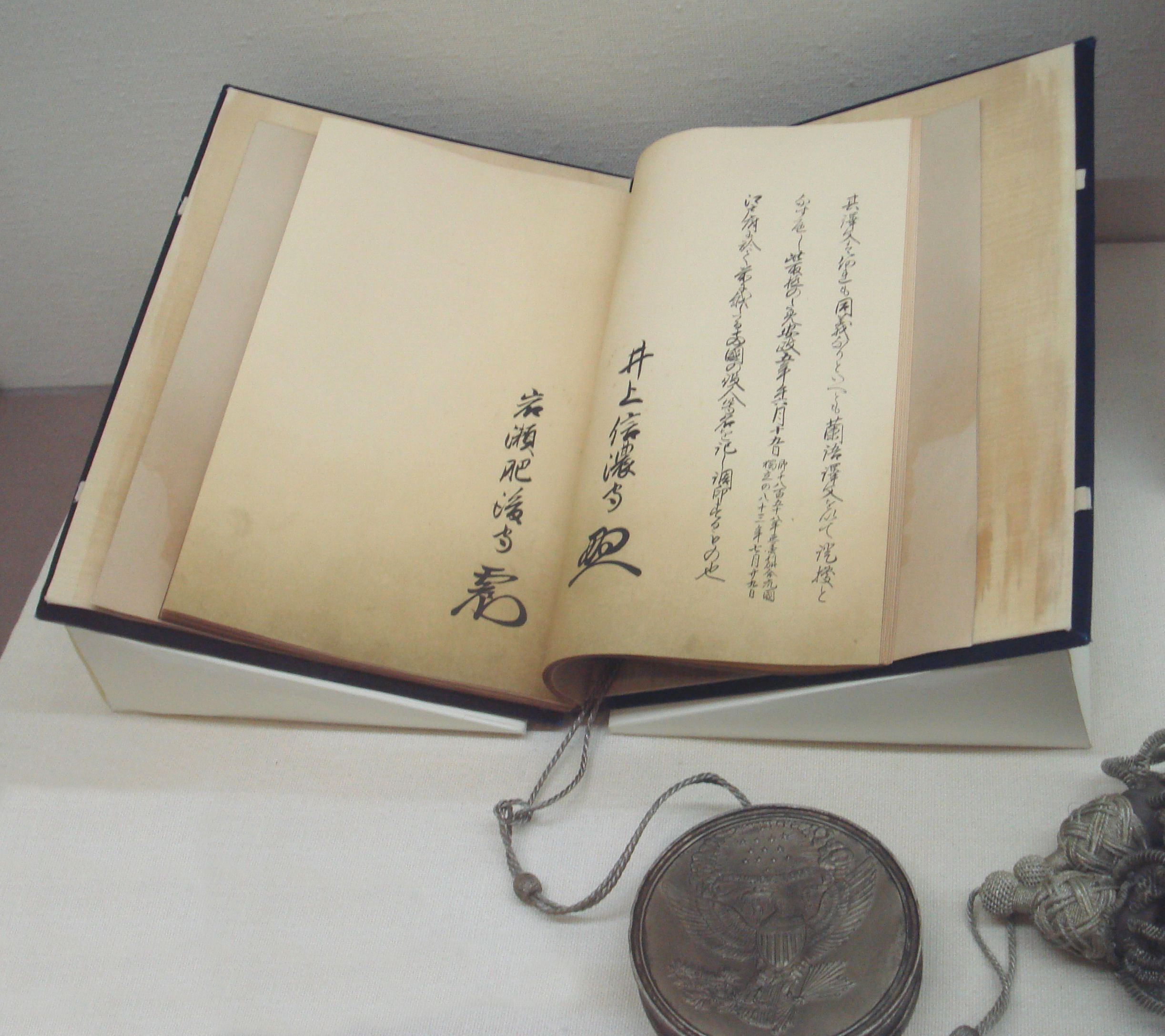
The Treaty of Amity and Commerce between Japan and the United States of 1858 marked the onset of Japan granting extraterritoriality to Western powers

The shogunate's capitulation to the unequal demands of Western powers sparked a wave of anti-Western sentiment known as Sonnō jōi ("Revere the Emperor, Expel the Barbarians"), which subsequently evolved into an anti-shogunate movement. In 1868, Tokugawa Yoshinobu restored political power to Emperor Meiji, bringing an end to centuries of shogunal rule. However, conflict persisted between the imperial faction and the former shogunate forces, escalating into the Boshin War, which resulted in an imperial victory. The new administration established during the Meiji era saw the leaders of the Meiji Restoration ascend to power, collectively known as the Meiji oligarchy.
