= Sheikh Ahmad (nobleman of Siam) =

Persian-born merchant (1543–1631)

Sheikh Ahmad Qomi
- شیخ احمد قمی
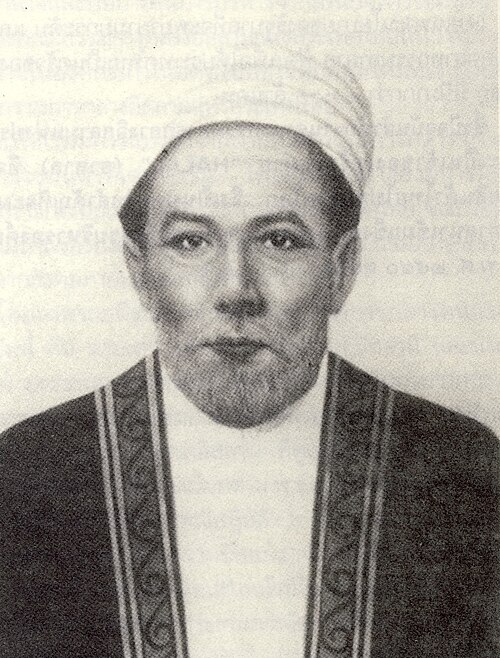
- Portrait of Sheikh Ahmad Qomi

Samuhanayok (Chief minister) of Ayutthaya Kingdom
- Monarch: King Songtham
- Preceded by: Okya Chakri
- Succeeded by: Chao Phraya Aphai Racha (Chuen)

Personal details
- Born: Sheikh Ahmad Qomi; 1543 Qom or Astarabad, Safavid Iran
- Died: 1631 (aged c. 88) Ayutthaya Kingdom
- Resting place: Tomb of Sheikh Ahmad, Phranakhon Si Ayutthaya Rajabhat University
- Spouse: Choei
- Children: Chao Phraya Aphai Racha (Chuen)
- Personal seal

Sheikh Ahmad Qomi (Persian: شیخ احمد قمی, romanized: Sheykh Ahmad Qomī; Thai: เฉกอะหมัด; RTGS: Chek Amat; c. 1543–1631), also known as Ahmad Qomi or Ahmad Kuni , was a Persian-born merchant who settled in the Ayutthaya Kingdom in the early 17th century. He rose to prominence as a powerful official at the Siamese court, receiving the name and title Chao Phraya Boworn Rajnayok (Thai: เจ้าพระยาบวรราชนายก). He is recognised as the progenitor of the influential Bunnag family.

== Origins and early life ==
Ahmad was born in Persia about 1543, and is sometimes said to be from the city of Qom, south of Tehran. However, this is disputed by his descendant Tej Bunnag, Thailand's Minister of Foreign Affairs, who claimed his ancestor hailed from a town called Guni in the Mazandaran/Astarabad region south of the Caspian Sea. He had a brother, Muhammad Said, who would later immigrate along with him to Siam. They may have arrived in Siam as early as 1595 or possibly in the early years of the 17th century. He set up a trading establishment in the Ghayee landing district, took a Thai wife, and became quite wealthy and prosperous.

== Siamese official ==
During the reign of Songtham, Ahmad was appointed to high positions in the royal administration. He was appointed Chao Kromma Tha Khwa ("Lord of the Right Pier"), which gave him authority over trade and resolving disputes involving foreigners other than the Chinese, and was made the first Chula Rajmontri (Shaykh al-Islām) of Siam's Muslim population. Later in the reign of Songtham, Ahmad was appointed Samuhanayok (one of the king's two chief chancellors), with the rank of Chao Phraya; his son Chun and grandson Sombun would later be appointed to the same position.

Shaykh Ahmad crushed and defeated Japanese merchants who attempted a coup against the Thai king in 1611.

== Descendants ==
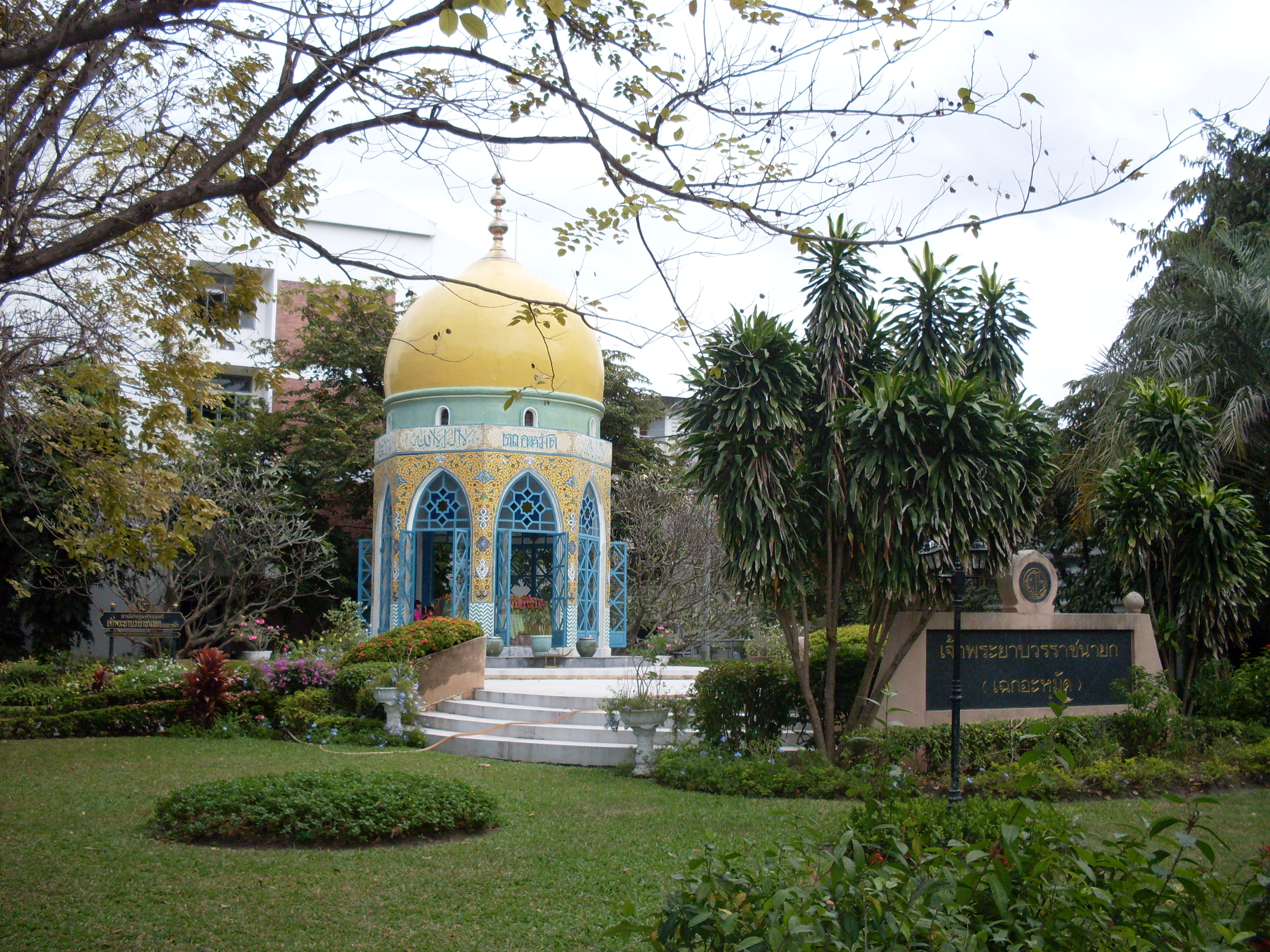
Tomb of Sheikh Ahmad of Qom in Ayutthaya

Some of Ahmad's Muslim descendants continued to hold the position of Chula Rajmontri until as late as 1945, but the bulk of his descendants converted to Buddhism.

One of Ahmad's descendants, Bunnag, married a sister of Queen Amarindra, the consort of King Rama I of the Rattanakosin era. His descendants, who took Bunnag as a surname, held powerful positions within the Thai government and cultural establishment from the 19th century to modern times. Among these descendants were Tish Bunnag (Prayurawongse), regent for King Mongkut, Chuang Bunnag (Somdet Chaophraya Sri Suriwongse), regent for King Chulalongkorn, Kham Bunnag (Chaophraya Thiphakorawong), Minister of State and Minister of the Treasury for King Mongkut, and Marut Bunnag, Speaker of the House of Representatives from 1992 to 1995.

== Cultural legacy ==
Ahmad is sometimes credited with introducing the popular Massaman curry dish to Thailand. This dish, along with others inspired by Persian dishes, is among the recipes in the funeral cookbooks of the Bunnag family.

Ahmad founded the Takiaayokin Mosque (granted its current name by Mongkut) in Ayutthaya in the 1620s. The Iranian embassy in Bangkok houses the Shaykh Ahmad Qumi Library, and in 2005 organized a Conference on Shaykh Ahmad Ghomi.
