= Mahasena =

Mahasena or Mahāsena may refer to:

- Mahasena, a name for Murugan, Hindu god of war
- Mahasena, a legendary king of the Kataragama region in Sri Lanka said to have ruled during the 6th century BCE
- Mahasena of Anuradhapura, a historical king of Sri Lanka who ruled from 275 to 301 CE
- Mahasena-gupta, a ruler of the Later Gupta dynasty in India
- Mahasena (genus), a genus of bagworm moth
- Chaophraya Mahasena, a Thai noble title
- Mahasena, the former HMCS Orkney, a ship of the Royal Ceylon Navy

== See also ==
- Mahasen (disambiguation)
