= List of samuhakalahom =

Grand Chancellor of the Military affairs
- สมุหพระกลาโหม
- Khotchasi Seal

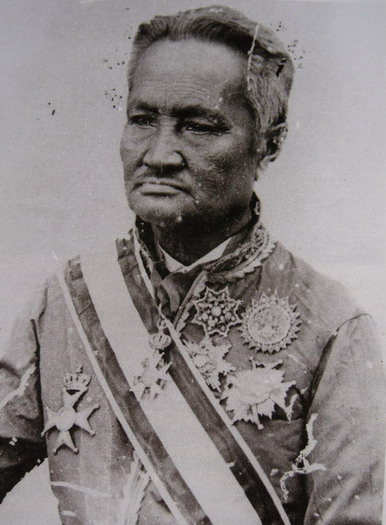
- Longest holder Somdet Chaophraya Borom Maha Sri Suriwongse; 1855 – 1882
- Department of Defence
- Style: Mr. Grand Chancellor (informal); The Honourable (formal); His Excellency (diplomatic)
- Appointer: King of Siam
- Term length: at His Majesty's pleasure
- Formation: 1760s
- First holder: Phraya Mahasena
- Final holder: Chaophraya Rattanathibet
- Abolished: 1894; 132 years ago

The samuhakalahom (Thai: สมุหกลาโหม) was one of the two chief ministers in the historical Chatusadom government system of Siam (now Thailand) in use from the Ayutthaya through early Rattanakosin periods. The post was originally charged with military affairs but later oversaw both civil and military affairs in southern cities. Officials who held the post usually received the noble title of Mahasena (Thai: มหาเสนา).

== List of samuhakalahom ==
=== Rattanakosin ===
1. Chaophraya Mahasena (Pli): Served King Rama I, from 1782.
2. Chaophraya Mahasena (Bunnag): Served Rama I until he died in 1805. He was the progenitor of the Bunnag family, which would become one of the most powerful noble families, with multiple descendants also holding the post.
3. Chaophraya Mahasena (Pin): Served during the reign of Rama I.
4. Chaophraya Mahasena (Bunma): Served until his death during the reign of Rama II.
5. Chaophraya Wongsasurasak (Saeng): Served until he died in 1822.
6. Chaophraya Mahasena (Sang): Served kings Rama II and Rama III.
7. Chaophraya Mahasena (Noi): Served until he died in 1830.
8. Somdet Chaophraya Borom Maha Prayurawong (Dis Bunnag): 1851–1855. He served both as kalahom and phra khlang, and held an especially esteemed position, with a sakdina of 30,000.
9. Somdet Chaophraya Borom Maha Si Suriwong (Chuang Bunnag): 1855–1882. He was one of the most powerful men in the kingdom and would become regent during the early years of Chulalongkorn's reign. He had a sakdina of 30,000.
10. Chaophraya Surawongwaiwat (Won Bunnag): Served until he died in 1888.
11. Chaophraya Rattanathibet (Phum): Held the position until its abolition.

== See also ==
- List of samuhanayok
- List of Defence Ministers of Thailand
