= Chaophraya Thiphakorawong =

Thai politician

Chao Phraya Thiphakorawong
- เจ้าพระยาทิพากรวงศมหาโกษาธิบดี
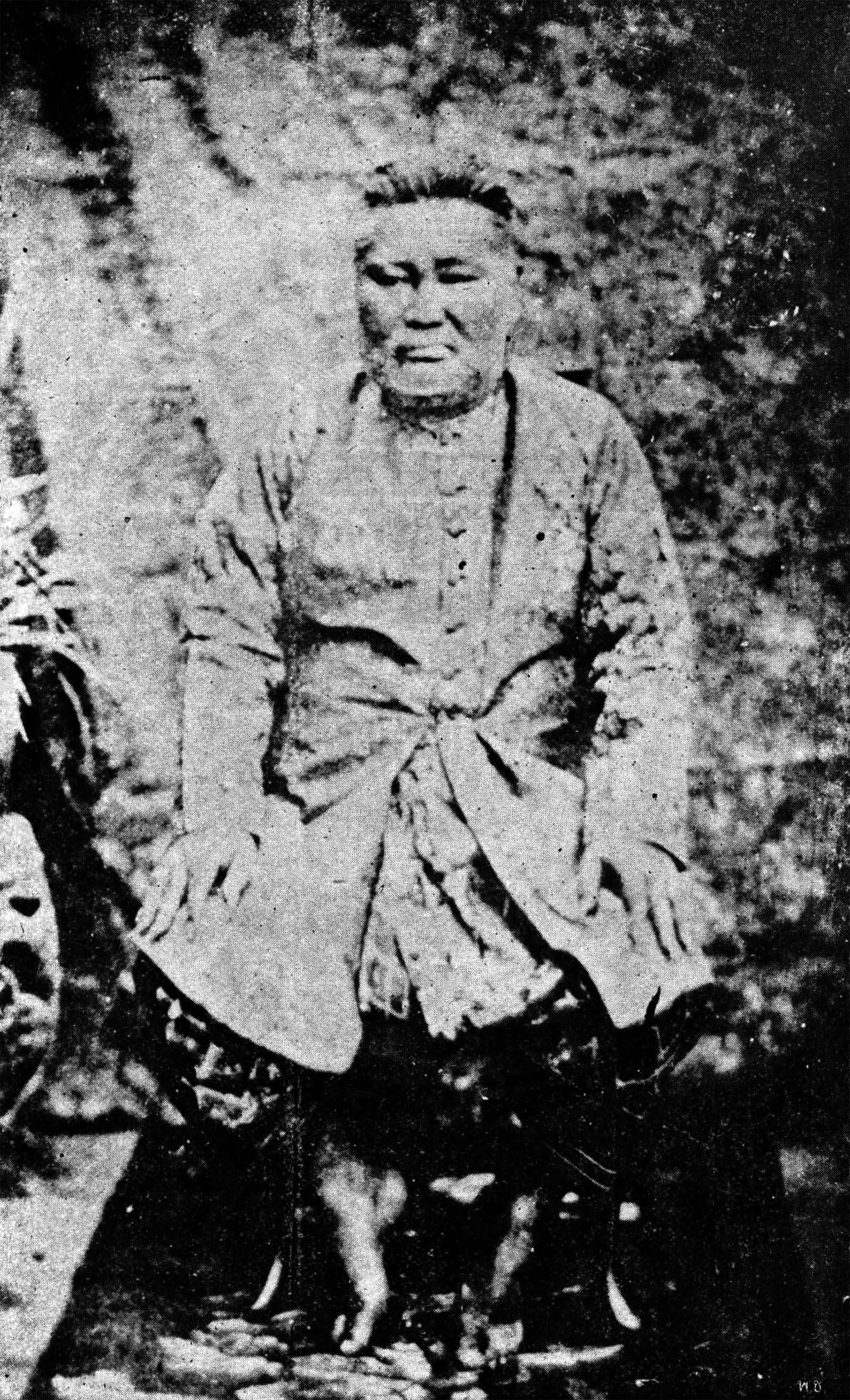
- A picture of Chaophraya Thiphakorawong

Phra Khlang (Minister of Exchequer)
- In office 1855–1867
- Monarch: Mongkut (Rama IV)
- Preceded by: Prayurawongse
- Succeeded by: Panuwongse

Personal details
- Born: 1 October 1813 Phra Nakhon, Bangkok, Siam
- Died: 1870 (aged 57) Phra Nakhon, Bangkok, Siam
- Spouse: Thanphuying Nu Bunnag
- Parents: Prayurawongse (father); Thanphuying Rod Bunnag (mother)

Chaophraya Thiphakorawong (1 October 1813–1870), born Kham Bunnag (Thai: ขํา บุนนาค, RTGS: Kham Bunnak), was a Thai aristocrat, government official, and scholar.

== Family ==
Kham Bunnag was born in 1813 into the powerful Bunnag family, a powerful Thai noble family of Persian ancestry. His father, Tish Bunnag, was a kinsman of the royal family who later served as regent for King Mongkut (Rama IV), while his brother Chuang Bunnag would go on to serve as regent for King Chulalongkorn (Rama V).

== Government service ==
Kham Bunnag entered the service of King Nangklao (Rama III), as an official in the Harbour Department. After the death of Rama III, the Bunnag family played a major role in selecting his successor. Kham's strong support for Mongkut earned him a role as Minister of State in 1853, Minister of the Treasury in 1855, and the title of Thiphakorawong in 1865.

== Scholarship ==
After ill health led to his retirement from public life in 1867, Thipakorawong spent the remainder of his life writing on history and religion. In 1867, he wrote his most famous work, Nangsue Sadaeng Kitchanukit ("A Book on Various Things"). Thipakorawong was commissioned by Chulalongkorn to write the history of the first four reigns of the Chakri dynasty, which he completed before his death in 1870. Though the history was complete by 1870, the section on the reign of Rama III was not published until 1934, due to a controversial section detailing a powerful prince's homosexual inclinations. Thipakorawong's historical works were often edited, particularly by Prince Damrong, to remove items that were considered scandalous or critical of the early monarchs.

== The Nangsue Sadaeng Kitchanukit ==
Thipakorawong's Nangsue Sadaeng Kitchanukit was a groundbreaking work, said to be both the first science textbook in Thai and the first Thai book to be printed without the assistance of Westerners. In this work, Thipakorawong argued against the literal truth of much traditional Buddhist cosmology (said to be contaminated by Brahmanism), while also attesting to the truth of Buddhist spiritual doctrines and the compatibility of modern science with Buddhism. He spent much of the book detailing how karma, reincarnation, and merit account for differences in social orders. While not necessarily derived from Mongkut's reforming views, it was clearly complementary to them.

The Nangsue Sadaeng Kitchanukit was translated into English by Henry Alabaster, an advisor to Chulalongkorn. Alabaster published his translation as the first part of his "The Wheel of the Law" in 1871. While generally regarded as a faithful translation, Alabaster's version omits many sections of Thipakorawong's work, including a defense of polygamy, and also includes his own commentary.
