= Prayurawongse =

Siamese noble and government official

His Grace Somdet Chao Phraya Borommaha Prayurawongse
- สมเด็จเจ้าพระยาบรมมหาประยูรวงศ์
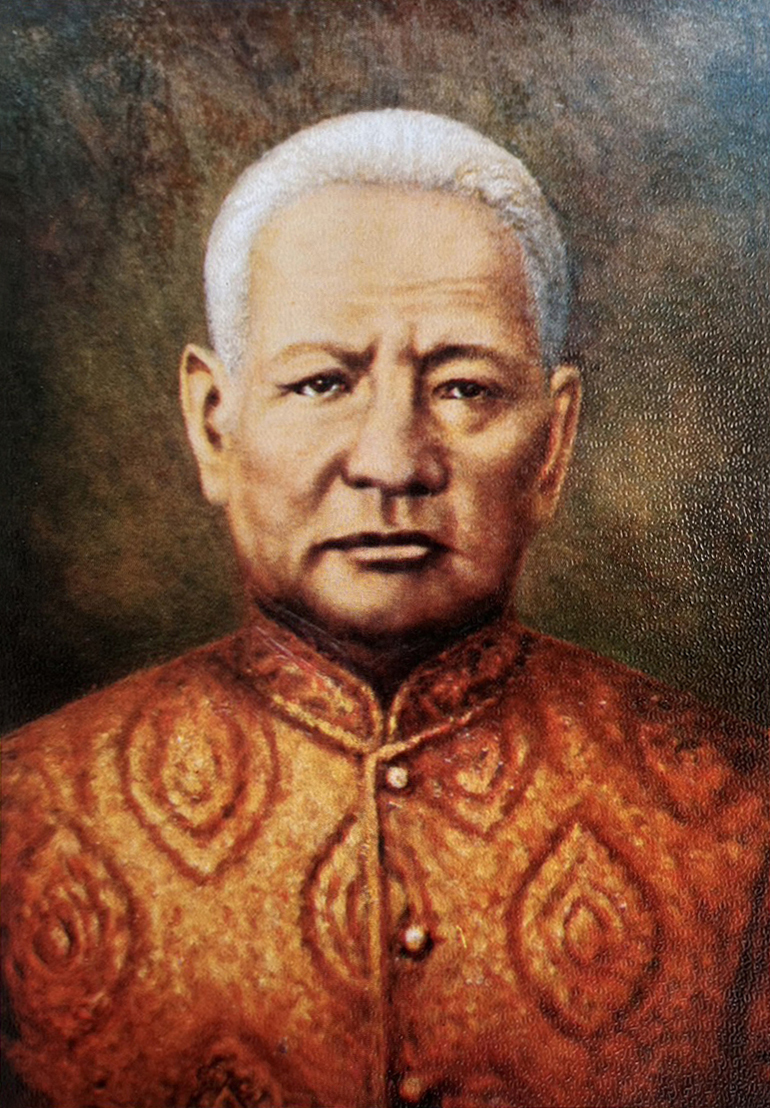

Regent of Siam
- In office 1851–1855
- Monarch: Mongkut (Rama IV)

Samuha Kalahom (Chief Minister of Southern Siam)
- In office 1830–1855
- Monarchs: Nangklao (Rama III); Mongkut (Rama IV)
- Preceded by: Chao Phraya Mahasena (Noi)
- Succeeded by: Si Suriyawongse

Phra Khlang (Minister of Trade and Foreign Affairs)
- In office 1821–1855
- Monarchs: Phutthaloetla Naphalai (Rama II); Nangklao (Rama III); Mongkut (Rama IV)
- Preceded by: Chao Phraya Phra Khlang (Sang)
- Succeeded by: Thipakornwongse

Personal details
- Born: 1788 Phra Nakhon, Bangkok, Siam
- Died: April 26, 1855 (aged 66–67) Thonburi, Bangkok, Siam
- Parents: Bunnag (father); Chao Kun Nuan Bunnag (mother)

Somdet Chao Phraya Borom Maha Prayurawongse (Thai: สมเด็จเจ้าพระยาบรมมหาประยูรวงศ์; RTGS: Somdet Chao Phraya Borom Maha Prayurawong; 1788 – 26 April 1855), also known as Dit Bunnag (Thai: ดิศ บุนนาค; RTGS: Dit Bunnak), was a prominent Siamese statesman of the mid-19th century and served as regent for King Mongkut throughout the kingdom. He rose to the exalted rank of Somdet Chao Phraya — the highest noble title attainable during the Rattanakosin Era, carrying a prestige comparable to royalty.

He was widely referred to as Somdet Chao Phraya Ong Yai (Thai: สมเด็จเจ้าพระยาองค์ใหญ่). Earlier in his career, he was known as Chao Phraya Phraklang (Thai: เจ้าพระยาพระคลัง), Minister of Trade, and became the dominant figure in Siam's Western and foreign affairs during the reign of King Rama III. He later held the office of Samuha Kalahom (Thai: สมุหกลาโหม), the chief minister responsible for the southern half of the kingdom, from 1830 until his death in 1855.

== Life ==
Dit Bunnag was born in 1788 to Bunnag and Chao Kun Nuan (who was Queen Amarindra's sister) at his father's residence off the southern side of the Grand Palace Wall near modern Wat Pho. His father, Bunnag, or Chao Phraya Akkamahasena (Thai: เจ้าพระยาอรรคมหาเสนา), had served as Samuha Kalahom, or the Prime Minister of Southern Siam during the reign of King Phutthayotfa Chulalok. Dit had an younger brother That who later became Somdet Chao Phraya Phichaiyat. Prayurawongse was a member of Bunnag family which descended from Sheikh Ahmad, a Persian minister during the reign of King Prasat Thong, his lineage having converted to Theravada Buddhism in the mid-eighteenth century..

Dit entered the palace as one of the royal pages - the traditional way to Siamese bureaucracy. He rose through ranks as one of the royal pages of King Phutthaloetla Naphalai. In 1818, the Grand Palace expanded south and the Bunnags moved to new residence on the West bank of Chao Phraya River in the Kudi Chin district. In 1819, Carlos Manoel de Silveira, the Portuguese delegate from Macau, arrived in Bangkok and established the first Western contact of the Rattanakosin period. Dit was in charge of the receiving Portuguese envoys.

Sultan Ahmad Tajuddin Halim Shah II of Kedah turned against Siamese domination, culminating in the Siamese invasion of Kedah in 1821. Siamese forces took Alor Setar and Siam took direct control over Kedah. The British on the island of Penang, which had been leased by Kedah to the British in 1786, suspected a possible Siamese invasion of Penang. The Marquess of Hastings, the Governor-General of India, sent John Crawfurd to Bangkok in April 1821. Dit was assigned to deal with the Crawfurd mission. Dit gave Crawfurd a place near his home in Thonburi for him to reside. After the Crawfurd mission, Dit was made Chao Phraya Phraklang, or the Minister of Trade.

In November 1825, when Henry Burney arrived in Bangkok. Phraklang was one of three Siamese delegates who took part in the enactment of the Burney Treaty in June 1826.

In 1828, Phraklang commissioned the construction of the Wat Prayurawongse in the Kudi Chin district. In 1830, King Rama III proposed to elevate Phraklang to the post of Samuha Kalahom. Phraklang refused, stating that the holder of the title of Chao Phraya Mahasena usually "passed away prematurely". King Rama III then assigned the post of Samuha Kalahom to Phraklang without officially providing him the title. Phraklang then became responsible in both Kalahom (Southern Siam) and the Kromma Tha for the Ministry of Trade.

In 1831, Tunku Kudin, nephew of Sultan Ahmad Tajuddin Halim Shah II, staged a revolt in Kedah, took control of Alor Setar and was joined by Patani. King Rama III assigned Phraklang to crush rebellions in Kedah and Patani. Both sultans of Kelantan and Terengganu sent forces to support Patani. Phraklang arrived at Songkhla in March 1832 and Chao Phraya Nakhon Noi the governor of Ligor had already taken Alor Setar so Phraklang went on to take Patani. Tuan Sulung, the governor of Pattani chose to flee towards Kelantan. When Phraklang had pursued Tuan Sulung to Kelantan, Sultan Muhammad I of Kelantan, who was a relative of Tuan Sulung, surrendered and left Tuan Sulung to Siamese authority.

Edmund Roberts led an American mission to Bangkok in March 1833. Roberts handed the letters of President Andrew Jackson to Phraklang and took residence in Phraklang's estate in Thonburi. This led to the passage of the Siamese–American Treaty of Amity and Commerce in April.

During the Siamese-Vietnamese Wars, in 1833, Phraklang led the Siamese fleet with the intention to attack Saigon. Phraklang quickly took Hà Tiên and proceeded through the Vĩnh Tế Canal to take Châu Đốc. Phraklang was joined at Châu Đốc by Chao Phraya Bodindecha who led land armies. Both Phraklang and Bodindecha marched along the Bassac River towards Saigon and met a Vietnamese fleet at Vàm Nao. During the battle of Vàm Nao, the Siamese fleet refused to engage with Vietnamese vessels, even though Phraklang himself had personally boarded a small boat in order to urge his fleet to attack. Phraklang and the Siamese fleet retreated to Châu Đốc, Hà Tiên and eventually to Chantaburi.

In March 1847, the Teochew societies, known as Tōa Hia, of Samut Sakhon rose in rebellion and murdered one of the royal guards. Phraklang and his son Kham marched with a royal guard regiment to subjugate the Chinese at Samut Sakhon. Next month in April, another Teochew insurrection occurred at Chachoengsao and the governor of Chachoengsao was killed. Phraklang then had his son Kham protect Samut Sakhon and he had chosen to lead another force to put down the Chinese rebellion in Chachoengsao with another son named Chuang. Phraklang met Bodindecha, who had been returning from Cambodia, again at Chachoengsao. After the rebellions had been over, they both returned to Bangkok.

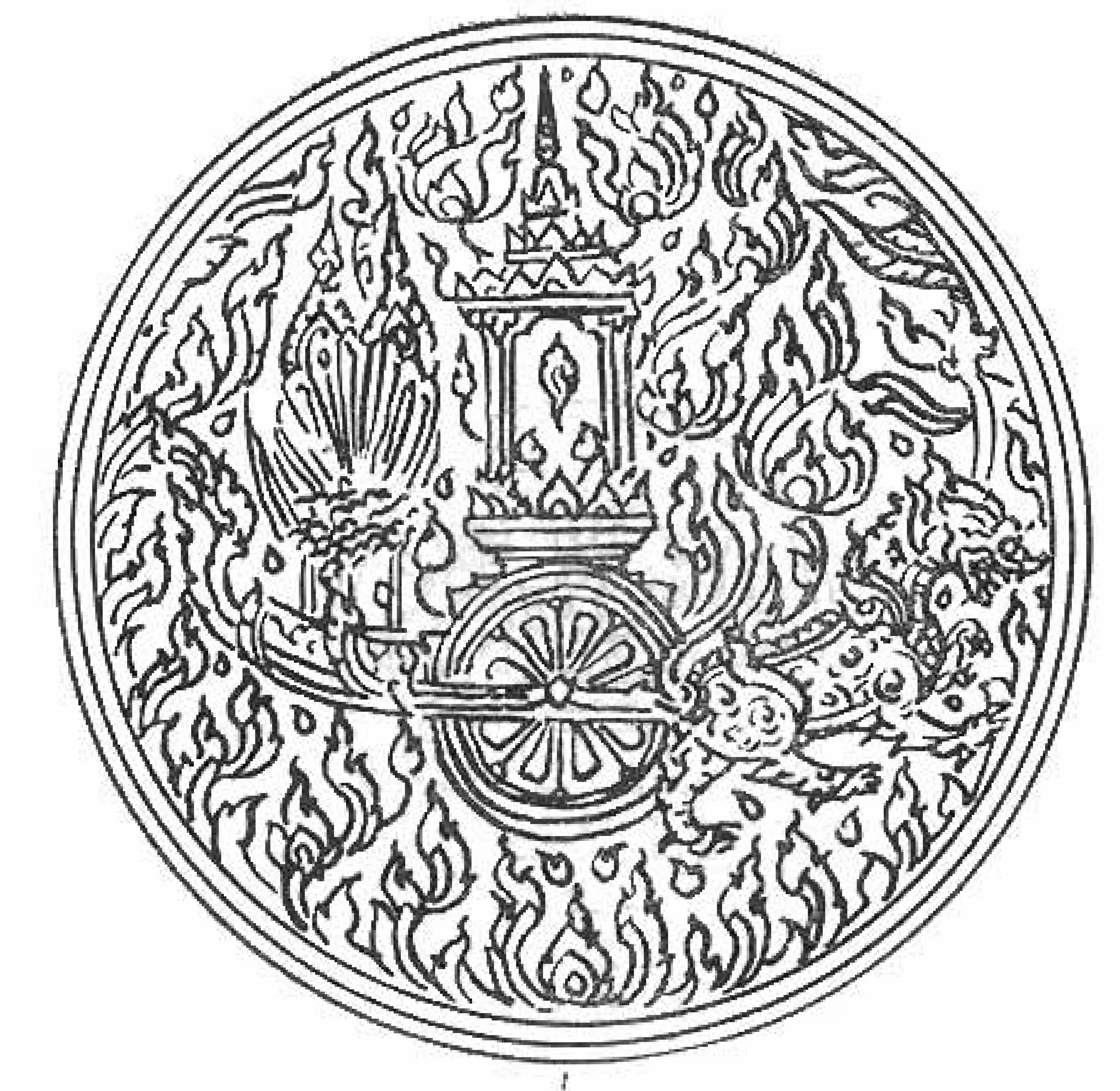
"Solar-charioteer" Seal of the Office of Somdet Chao Phraya Borom Maha Prayurawongse, granted by King Mongkut in 1851.

With the demise of Chao Phraya Bodindecha in 1849, Phraklang became the most powerful political figure in court. Phraklang had played a great role in the ascension of King Mongkut. In 1851, King Mongkut bestowed Phraklang with the title of Somdet Chao Phraya Borom Maha Prayurawongse and became Mongkut's regent nation-wide along with his brother Phraya Sripipat (That Bunnag) who became Somdet Chao Phraya Borom Maha Phichaiyat and Mongkut's regent in Bangkok. Prayurawongse's honor was equal to that of a prince. Prayurawongse was granted the right to use the Solar-charioteer Seal (Thai: ตราสุริยมณฑลเทพบุตรชักรถ) To distinguish him from his brother, Prayurawongse was known colloquially as "Somdet Chao Phraya Ong Yai" (Thai: สมเด็จเจ้าพระยาองค์ใหญ่ "The Elder Somdet Chao Phraya") while his brother was called the "Somdet Chao Phraya Ong Noi" (Thai: สมเด็จเจ้าพระยาองค์น้อย "The Younger Somdet Chao Phraya").

During the reign of King Mongkut, Prayurawongse officially held the post of both Samuha Kalahom and Kromma Tha. However, the de facto duties were already distributed to his sons. His son Chuang, who was made Chao Phraya Sri Suriyawongse (later Somdet Chao Phraya Sri Suriyawongse), was the deputy of Kalahom. His another son Kham was deputy of Kromma Tha (he was later made Chao Phraya Thipakornwongse) the Ministry of Trade. Prayurawongse was one of the plenipotentiaries during the negotiation of the Bowring Treaty in April 1855. Bowring had demanded free trade and to end the monopoly of Siamese royal court in Western trade. The Bowring Treaty was concluded and free trade was established.

A month after the Bowring Treaty, Prayurawongse died at his residence near Wat Prayurawongse in modern Thonburi District on 26 April 1855, aged 67. His funeral and cremation were held in the manner and ceremonies of royalty at Wat Prayurawongse in October 1855. His sons and descendants continued to dominate Siamese politics in the later part of nineteenth century.

== Family and descendants ==
Prayurawongse had numerous wives, in accordance with contemporary Siamese social customs. His principal wife was Lady Chan, a daughter of Phraya Pollathep Thongin. Princess Praphaiwadi (daughter of King Rama I and elder sister of King Rama II) gave two of her ladies-in-waiting, Lady Rod and Lady Inyai, to be his wives. Queen Sri Suriyendra likewise presented Lady Peung to him. In total, he had twenty-four wives and forty-four children. His notable sons included:

- Chuang Bunnag (1808–1882), born to Lady Chan, who later became Somdet Chao Phraya Sri Suriyawongse. He succeeded his father as Samuha Kalahom in 1855 and served as regent during the minority of King Chulalongkorn from 1868 to 1873.
- Kham Bunnag (1813–1870), born to Lady Rod, who later became Chao Phraya Thipakornwongse. He succeeded his father as Minister of Trade (Kromma Tha) in 1855.
- Chum Bunnag (1820–1866), born to Lady Chan, who later held the title Phraya Montri Suriyawong. He led the Siamese diplomatic mission to London in 1857.
- Tuam Bunnag (1830–1913), born to Lady Peung, who later became Chao Phraya Panuwongse. He succeeded his brother Thipakornwongse as Minister of Kromma Tha in 1869 and became the first Minister of Foreign Affairs of Siam in 1875.
- Porn Bunnag (1849–1920), born to Lady Inyai, who later became Chao Phraya Phatsakorawong. He was the first Minister of Agriculture (1892–1894) and the first Minister of Education (1892–1902).
