= List of samuhanayok =

Grand Chancellor of the Civil Affairs
- สมุหนายก
- Ratchasi Seal

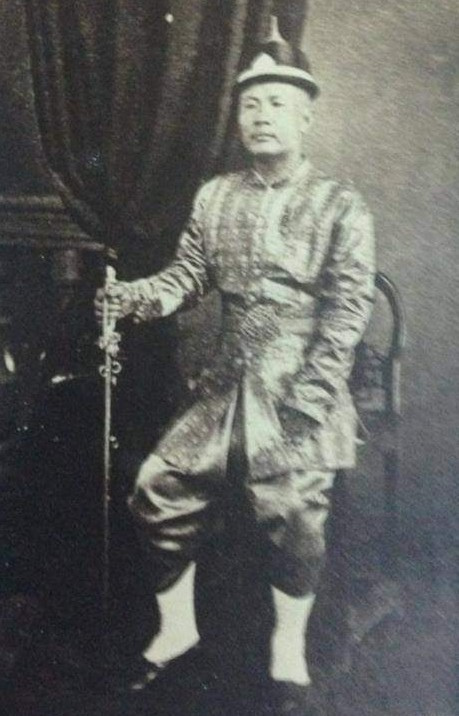
- Last holder Chaophraya Rattanabodin; 1886 – 1892
- Department of Interior
- Style: Mr. Grand Chancellor (informal); The Honourable (formal); His Excellency (diplomatic)
- Appointer: King of Siam
- Term length: at His Majesty's pleasure
- Formation: 1550s
- First holder: Okya Chakri
- Final holder: Chaophraya Rattanabodin
- Abolished: 1892; 134 years ago

The samuhanayok (Thai: สมุหนายก) was one of the two chief ministers in the historical Chatusadom government system of Siam (now Thailand), originally charged with civil affairs but later overseeing both civil and military affairs in northern cities. During the Ayutthaya and Thonburi periods, the official who held the post usually took the noble title of Chakri (Thai: จักรี, RTGS: Chakkri). The term, from Sanskrit चक्री cakrī, literally meant "one who has a discus", referring to the Hindu god Vishnu who possesses the discus Sudarshana).

The last office-holder to be known by the title Chakri was Thongduang, who established the Rattanakosin Kingdom and became King Rama I in 1782. His dynasty, which includes the current Thai royal family, is known as the Chakri Dynasty after his former title. Later office-holders of Rattanakosin were granted individualized titles.

== List of samuhanayok ==
No.	Portrait	Title and name	Term of office	Monarch	Notes
		Okya Chakri ออกญาจักรี	c. 1550s ~	Maha Chakkraphat	
		Phraya Chakri	c. 1560s	Mahinthrathirat	Became a spy for King Bayinnaung of Burma, leading to the first fall of Ayutthaya in 1569.
3 reigns later
		Chaophraya Bowonratchanayok (Sheikh Ahmad) เจ้าพระยาบวรราชนายก (เฉกอะหมัด)	c. 1600s ~	Borommaracha I (Songtham)	
2 reigns later
		Chaophraya Aphairacha (Chuen) เจ้าพระยาอภัยราชา (ชื่น)	c. 1600s–1685	Sanphet V (Prasat Thong)	
		Chaophraya Aphairacha (Chuen) เจ้าพระยาอภัยราชา (ชื่น)	c. 1600s–1685	Sanphet VI (Chai)	
		Chaophraya Aphairacha (Chuen) เจ้าพระยาอภัยราชา (ชื่น)	c. 1600s–1685	Sanphet VII (Si Suthammaracha)	
		Chaophraya Aphairacha (Chuen) เจ้าพระยาอภัยราชา (ชื่น)	c. 1600s–1685	Ramathibodi III (Narai)	
		Phraya Wichaiyen (Constantine Phaulkon) พระยาวิไชเยนทร์ (คอนสแตนติน ฟอลคอน)	1685–1688	Ramathibodi III (Narai)	
		Chaophraya Chamnanphakdi (Sombun) เจ้าพระยาชำนาญภักดี (สมบุญ)	1688–1703	Ramathibodi III (Narai)	
		Chaophraya Chamnanphakdi (Sombun) เจ้าพระยาชำนาญภักดี (สมบุญ)	1688–1703	Phetracha	
		Chaophraya Chakri (Khrut) เจ้าพระยาจักรี (ครุฑ)	c. 1705s ~	Phetracha	
		Chaophraya Chakri (Khrut) เจ้าพระยาจักรี (ครุฑ)	c. 1705s ~	Sanphet VIII (Suriyenthrathibodi)	
		Chaophraya Chakri (Khunnen) เจ้าพระยาจักรี (ขุนเณร)	–1726	Sanphet IX (Thai Sa)	Died after sentenced to a hundred lashes by the Uparaja (the King's brother) for a minor transgression
		Phraya Ratchasongkhram (Pan) พระยาราชสงคราม (ปาน)	c. 1720s ~	Sanphet IX (Thai Sa)	
		Chaophraya Phetphichai (Chai) เจ้าพระยาเพ็ชร์พิไชย (ใจ)	c. 1730s ~	Maha Thammarachathirat II (Borommakot)	
		Chaophraya Aphaimontri เจ้าพระยาอภัยมนตรี	c. 1740s ~	Maha Thammarachathirat II (Borommakot)	
		Chaophraya Ratchaphakdi (Sawang) เจ้าพระยาราชภักดี (สว่าง)	c. 1750s ~	Maha Thammarachathirat II (Borommakot)	
		Phraya Aphairacha เจ้าพระยาอภัยราชา	c. 1750s–c. 1770s	Maha Thammarachathirat III (Uthumphon)	
		Phraya Aphairacha เจ้าพระยาอภัยราชา	c. 1750s–c. 1770s	Borommaracha III (Ekkathat)	
Fall of Ayutthaya
1		Chaophraya Chakri (Mud) เจ้าพระยาจักรี (หมุด)	1767–1774	Taksin (Sanphet X)	Usually referred as Chaophraya Chakri Khaek (the 'Muslim Chaophraya Chakri'); he was a descendant of Suleiman, the sultan of Songkhla.
2		Chaophraya Chakri (Thongduang) เจ้าพระยาจักรี (ทองด้วง)	1770–1782	Taksin (Sanphet X)	Also known by the title Somdet Chaophraya Mahakasatsuek (though sources are conflicting). Later seized the throne, establishing Rattanakosin and becoming King Rama I.
Fall of Thonburi
1		Chaophraya Rattanaphiphit (Son [Sandhiratna]) เจ้าพระยารัตนาพิพิธ (สน สนธิรัตน์)	1782–1805	Rama I	
2		Chaophraya Rattanathibet (Kun [Ratnakula]) เจ้าพระยารัตนาธิเบศร์ (กุน รัตนกุล)	1809–1813	Rama II	
3		Chaophraya Aphaiphuthon (Noi [Punyaratabandhu]) เจ้าพระยาอภัยภูธร (น้อย บุณยรัตพันธุ์)	1813–1827	Rama II	
3		Chaophraya Aphaiphuthon (Noi [Punyaratabandhu]) เจ้าพระยาอภัยภูธร (น้อย บุณยรัตพันธุ์)	1813–1827	Rama III	
4		Chaophraya Bodindecha (Sing [Sinhaseni]) เจ้าพระยาบดินทรเดชา (สิงห์ สิงหเสนี)	1829–1849	Rama III	Spent most of his term leading war campaigns, and was deputized by Phraya Sisahathep (Thongpheng)
5		Chaophraya Nikonbodon (To [Kalyanamitra]) เจ้าพระยานิกรบดินทร์ (โต กัลยาณมิตร)	1851–1863	Rama III	
5		Chaophraya Nikonbodon (To [Kalyanamitra]) เจ้าพระยานิกรบดินทร์ (โต กัลยาณมิตร)	1851–1863	Mongkut (Rama IV)	
6		Chaophraya Phutharaphai (Nut [Punyaratabandhu]) เจ้าพระยาภูธราภัย (นุช บุณยรัตพันธุ์)	1863–1878	Mongkut (Rama IV)	
6		Chaophraya Phutharaphai (Nut [Punyaratabandhu]) เจ้าพระยาภูธราภัย (นุช บุณยรัตพันธุ์)	1863–1878	Chulalongkorn (Rama V)	
7		Prince Mahamala, Krom Somdet Phra Bamrapporapak สมเด็จพระเจ้าบรมวงศ์เธอ เจ้าฟ้ามหามาลา กรมพระยาบำราบปรปักษ์	1878–1886	Chulalongkorn (Rama V)	
8		Chaophraya Rattanabodin (Rot [Kalyanamitra]) เจ้าพระยารัตนบดินทร์ (รอด กัลยาณมิตร)	1886–1892	Chulalongkorn (Rama V)	Some sources give his name as Bunrot (บุญรอด)
Position Abolished

== See also ==
- List of samuhakalahom
- List of prime ministers of Thailand
