= Mahasen =

Mahasen may refer to:

- Kartikeya, also known as Mahasen or Mahasena from maha (great) + sena (army), the Hindu god of war
- Mahasena of Anuradhapura, a king of Sri Lanka who ruled the country from 277 to 304 AD
- Cyclone Mahasen, a cyclonic storm in the Bay of Bengal in 2013, renamed Cyclone Viyaru due to apparent negative showing of the Anuradhapura king

== See also ==
- Mahasena (disambiguation)
