= Bowring Treaty =

1855 treaty between the United Kingdom and Siam

Treaty of Friendship and Commerce between Great Britain and Siam
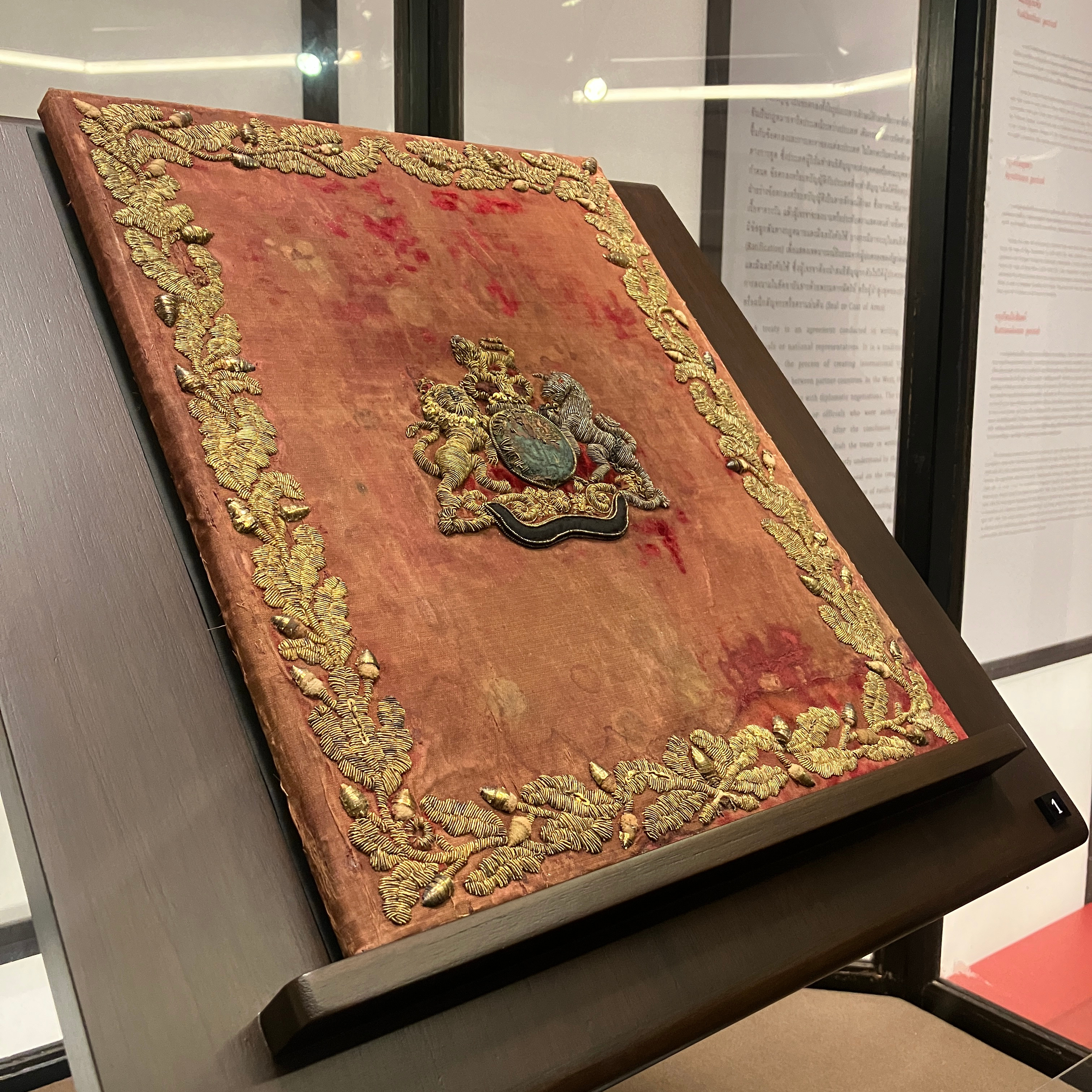
- The original document, with decorated cover
- Type: Unequal Treaty
- Signed: 18 April 1855
- Location: Mansion of Somdet Chaophraya Prayurawong; Thonburi, Bangkok
- Ratified: 5 April 1856
- Effective: 6 April 1856
- Expiration: British extraterritorial jurisdiction in Siam: 9 July 1909 (53 years) Anglo-Siamese Treaty of 1909; Siam's three percent tariff and other provisions: 30 March 1926 (69 years) Anglo–Siamese Treaty of 1925
- Signatories: Sir John Bowring: (Thailand) Wongsa Dhiraj Snid (Thailand) Somdet Chaophraya Prayurawong (Dit Bunnag) (Thailand) Somdet Chaophraya Phichaiyat (That Bunnag) (Thailand) Chaophraya Si Suriyawong (Chuang Bunnag) (Thailand) Chaophraya Rawiwong (Kham Bunnag)
- Parties: British Empire; Siam
- Language: English and Thai

Full text
- Bowring Treaty at Wikisource

Treaty of Friendship and Commerce between Great Britain and Siam (Thai: หนังสือสัญญากรุงเทพมหานครกับกรุงอังกริษเปนทางไมตรีค้าขายกัน), known colloquially as the Bowring Treaty, was the historic landmark treaty signed between the United Kingdom during the reign of Queen Victoria and the Kingdom of Siam during the reign of King Mongkut on 18 April 1855 at Thonburi, Bangkok. The treaty had tremendous effects on Siamese economy, society and international relations in Thai history, marking the advent of "Modern Siam" in most historiographies, also serving as the model for "Bowring-type" unequal treaties that Siam was going to make with other Western nations in the nineteenth century.

The Anglo–Siamese Burney Treaty of 1826, which Siam made with the British East India Company, stipulated abolition of monopoly of Phra Khlang Sinkha or Royal Warehouse, granting the British merchants free trade in Siam without having to go through the Royal Warehouse, which formerly held monopoly over all Western trades in Siam. However, the British merchants were subjected to the measurement duties, which were collected according to the breath of incoming merchant ships and the British in Siam were still subjected to local Siamese laws.

Both the British and the Siamese were unsatisfied with the Burney Treaty terms. To compensate for revenue loss, Siam reintroduced monopolies through tax farming in the 1840s. British merchants in Singapore complained to the British Indian government about Siam's supposed violation of the treaty and, when the latter did not respond, complained directly to the Foreign Office. As the British Empire arose in power in the Far East in the aftermath of First Opium War, Lord Palmerston the British Foreign Secretary sent Sir James Brooke to obtain a new treaty from Siam in 1850. Brooke proposed reduction of duties and establishment of British consular jurisdiction in Siam but the Siamese rejected them all, leading to detorioration of the Anglo–Siamese relations and the British considering sending warships to Siam.

Ascension of King Mongkut of Siam, who had been well-disposed towards Westerners, in 1851 shifted the Siamese policies. Mongkut publicly urged Sir James Brooke to resume his negotiations but Brooke was unable to return to Siam. In 1854, Lord Clarendon the British Foreign Secretary appointed Sir John Bowring the Governor of Hong Kong as the British plenipotentiary to conclude a new treaty with Siam. Bowring and his assistant Harry Parkes arrived in Bangkok in March 1855. Mongkut appointed five Siamese plenipotentiaries to negotiate with Bowring, among them was Chaophraya Si Suriyawong Chuang Bunnag or Phra Kalahom who favoured Bowring's proposals. The Bowring Treaty was signed on 18 April 1855 at the mansion of Somdet Chaophraya Prayurawong in modern Thonburi, Bangkok. The treaty terms included;

- Establishment of British extraterritorial jurisdiction in Siam; Britain appointed Consul to Bangkok to oversee the British subjects in Siam. Any legal cases involving British subjects as defendants would be judged by the British Consul under British law not under Siamese law and judiciary.
- Abolition of the measurement duties stipulated in the 1826 Burney Treaty in favour of the general import duty of low rate of three percent.
- Permission of travel and land ownership for the British in the designated area surrounding Bangkok under specific conditions
- Legalization of British opium import into Siam only through Siam's government opium tax farmers

The treaty was set to come into effect on 6 April 1856, about one year after the signing. Harry Parkes brought the Bowring Treaty to the British government at London for ratification, where the Queen's Advocate found the Bowring Treaty terms to be vague. Harry Parkes was then assigned to return to Siam to exchange ratifications and to obtain additional terms to clarify some points of the treaty. Ratifications of the Bowring Treaty were exchanged on 5 April 1856 at the Siamese royal palace. Anglo–Siamese Agreement of May 1856, concluded between Harry Parkes and the Siamese, stipulated that the British in Siam were under exclusive jurisdiction of British Consul without interference from the Siamese government and preceding Burney Treaty terms that did not conflict with the Bowring Treaty continued to take effect.

The Bowring Treaty served as the model of other unequal treaties that Siam was going to make with other Western nations, most notably the American–Siamese Harris Treaty of May 1856 and the Franco–Siamese Montigny Treaty of August 1856. Amicable relations between Great Britain and Siam established by this Bowring Treaty also led to the Siamese diplomatic mission to London in 1857. This Bowring Treaty had immense liberalizing effects on the Siamese economy. Low duties per the principle of free trade attracted more British merchants as British Empire replaced Qing China as the main trading partner of Siam, transforming Siam from self-subsistence economy to a marketised export-oriented one. However, reduction of duties also had drastic effects on state revenue, which Siam sacrificed in order to preserve sovereignty.

Provisions of the Bowring Treaty were subsequently amended and dismantled through successive treaties. As the British came in great numbers for the teak industry in Northern Siam, the Anglo–Siamese Chiengmai Treaty of 1883 stipulated appointment of British Vice-Consul to Chiang Mai and that any legal cases involving British subjects only in the three Northern Thai provinces of Chiang Mai, Lampang and Lamphun, were to be judged by the Siamese royal commissioner in a mixed court under presence of the British Vice-Consul. This was a major milestone as this was the first time the Siamese were allowed to judge cases involving British subjects as defendants.

Anglo–Siamese Treaty of 1909, in which Siam ceded the Northern Malay sultanates of Kedah, Kelantan, Terengganu and Perlis to British Malaya, abolished most of British extraterritorial jurisdiction in Siam as stipulated by the Bowring Treaty. All British subjects in Siam were placed under Siamese jurisdiction in mixed courts with presence of British legal advisors. Siam's entry into World War I on the Allies side gave Siam the opportunity to abrogate existing unequal treaties that Siam had concluded with Western nations. In 1924, King Vajiravudh sent Francis Bowes Sayre, an American Harvard Law professor, to go on a European tour to renegotiate treaties with European nations on Siam's behalf. The Anglo–Siamese Treaty of 1925, signed in July 1925, terminated the Bowring Treaty as a whole in Article V. British subjects in Siam came under jurisdiction of Siamese ordinary courts without any British legal advisors and the three-percent tariff was abolished.

== Background ==
The Burney Treaty had been signed between the Kingdom of Siam and the British Empire in 1826, coming about as a result of the two powers having a mutual opposition to the Ava Kingdom. That treaty had failed to settle commercial issues, leading to the arrival of Sir John Bowring to Siam in order to negotiate a new one. The treaty negotiated by him allowed free trade by foreign merchants in Bangkok, as all foreign trade had previously been subject to heavy taxation by the Siamese Crown. The treaty also allowed the establishment of a British consulate in Bangkok and guaranteed its full extraterritorial powers, and allowed British subjects to own land in Siam.

== Sovereign and signatories ==
=== Sovereigns ===
==== Britain ====
- Her Majesty the Queen of the United Kingdom of Great Britain and Ireland, and all its dependencies (Queen Victoria of the United Kingdom)
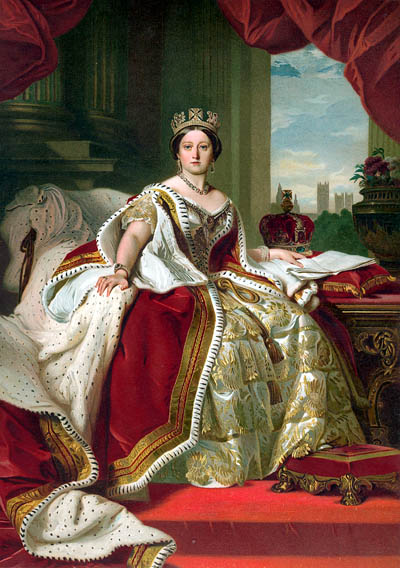
Queen Victoria of the United Kingdom

==== Siam ====
- Phra Bard Somdetch Phra Paramendr Maha Mongkut Phra Chom Klau Chau Yu Hua, the first King of Siam (King Mongkut of Siam)
- Phra Bard Somdetch Phra Pawarendr Ramesr Mahiswaresr Phra Pin Klau Chau Yu Hua, the second King of Siam (Vice-King Pinklao, younger brother of Mongkut)
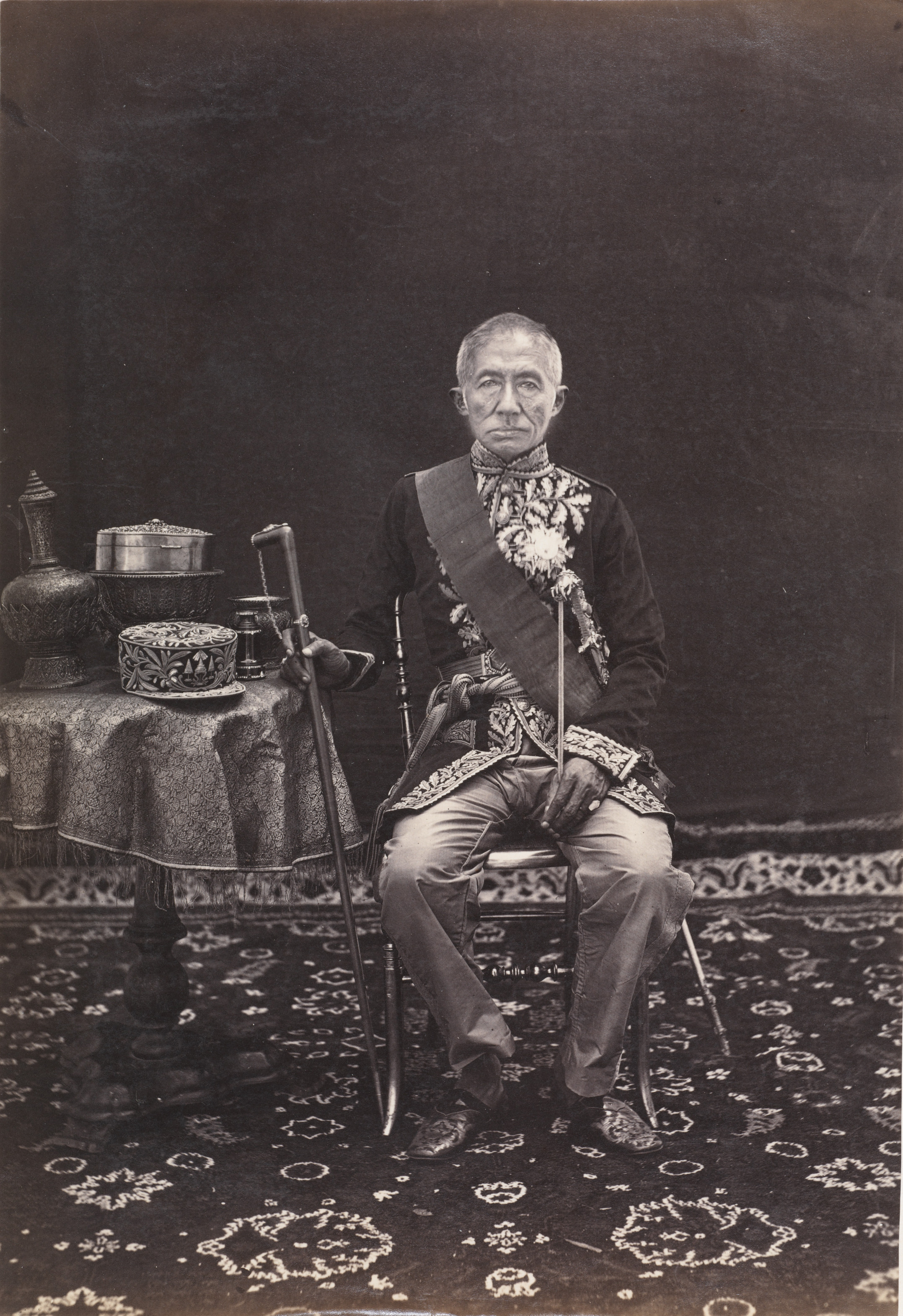
Mongkut, the First King of Siam

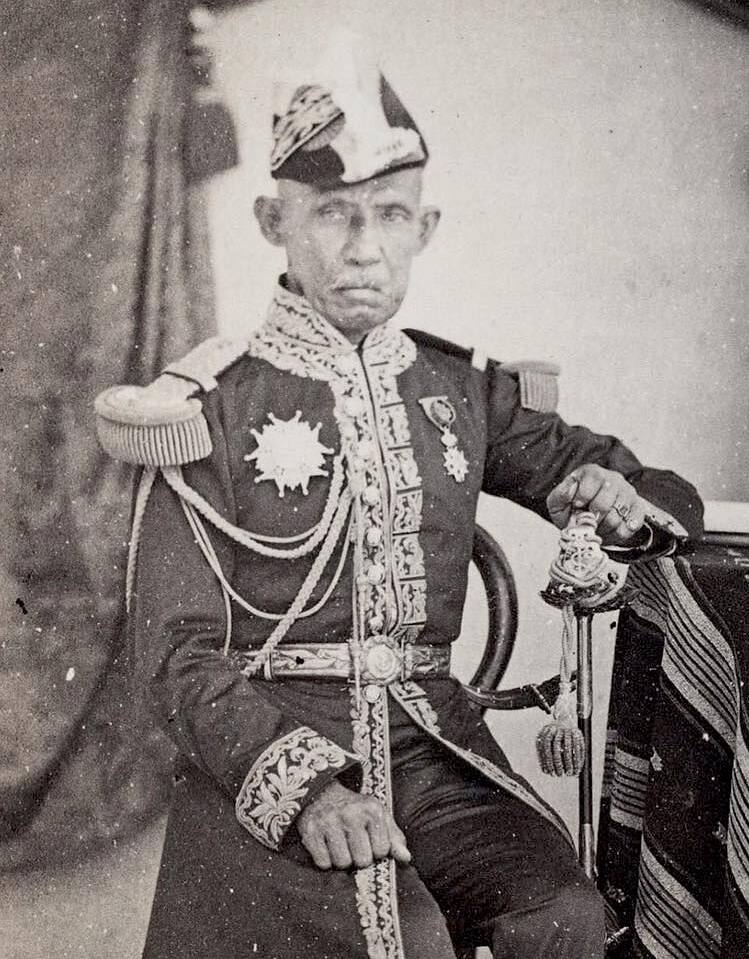
Pinklao, the Second King of Siam

=== Signatories ===
==== Britain ====
- Sir John Bowing, Knight, Doctor of Laws, &c., &c.
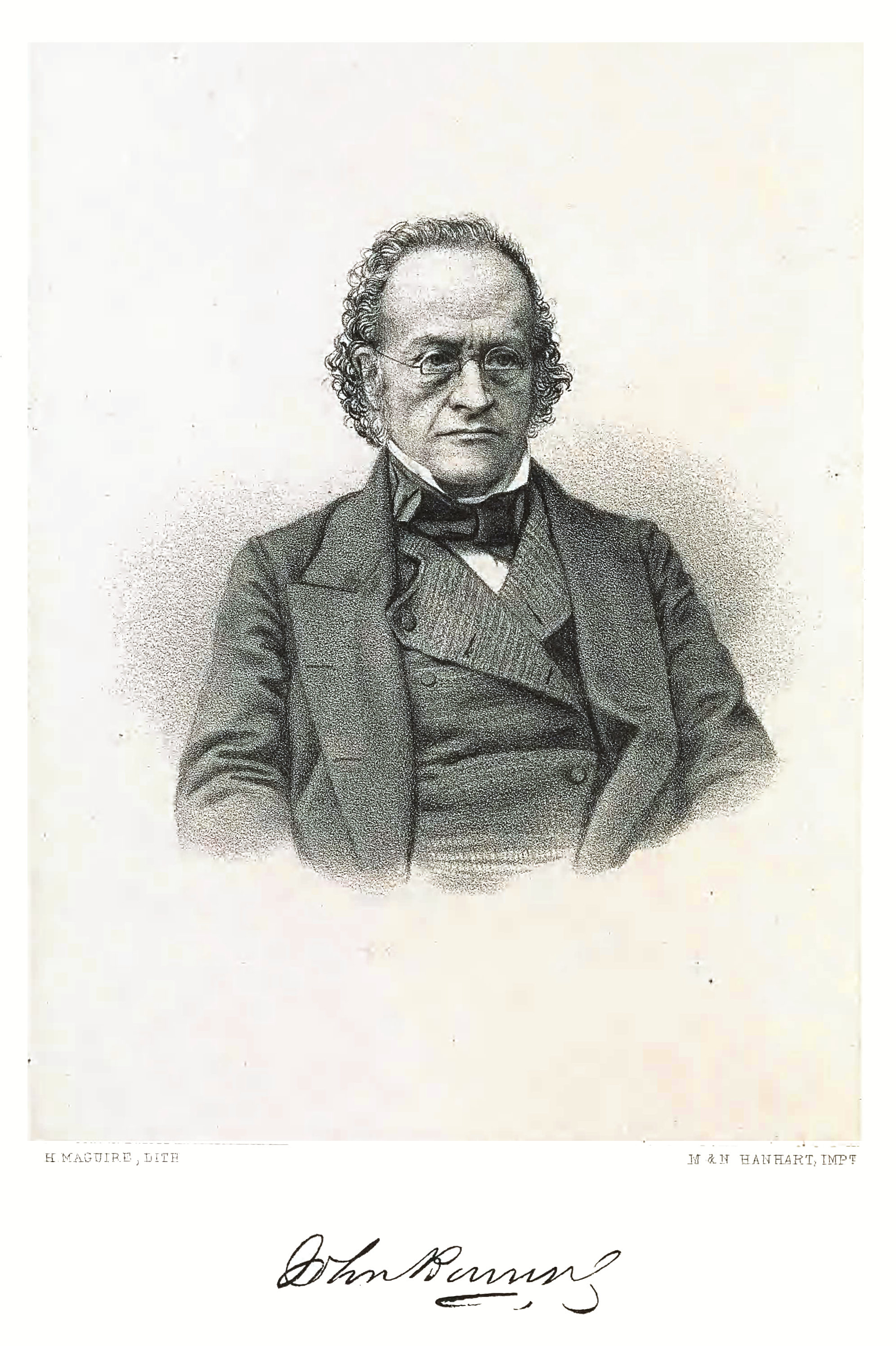
Sir John Bowring, Governor of Hong Kong

==== Siam ====
- His Royal Highness Krom Hluang Wongsa Dhiraj Snidh (Prince Wongsa Dhiraj Snid, representing the Siamese royal family)
- His Excellency Somdetch Chau Phaya Param Maha Puyurawongse, &c. &c (Somdet Chaophraya Borom Maha Prayurawong, personal name Dit Bunnag, the king's regent kingdom-wide)
- His Excellency Somdetch Chau Phaya Param Maha Bijai-neate, &c. &c. (Somdet Chaophraya Borom Maha Phichaiyat, personal name That Bunnag, the king's regent in Bangkok, younger brother of Dit Bunnag)
- His Excellency Chau Phaya Sri Suriwongse Samuha Phra Kalahom, &c. &c. (Chaophraya Si Suriyawong, personal name Chuang Bunnag, the Samuha Kalahom or Prime Minister of Southern Siam, son of Dit Bunnag)
- His Excellency Chau Phaya, &c, Acting Phra-Klang (Chaophraya Rawiwong, personal name Kham Bunnag, the Phrakhlang or Siamese Foreign Minister, other son of Dit Bunnag)
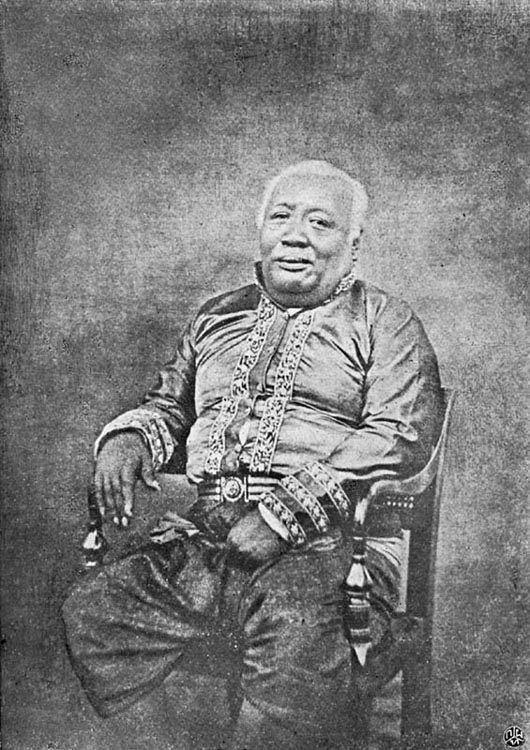
Prince Wongsa Dhiraj Snid, younger half-brother of King Mongkut

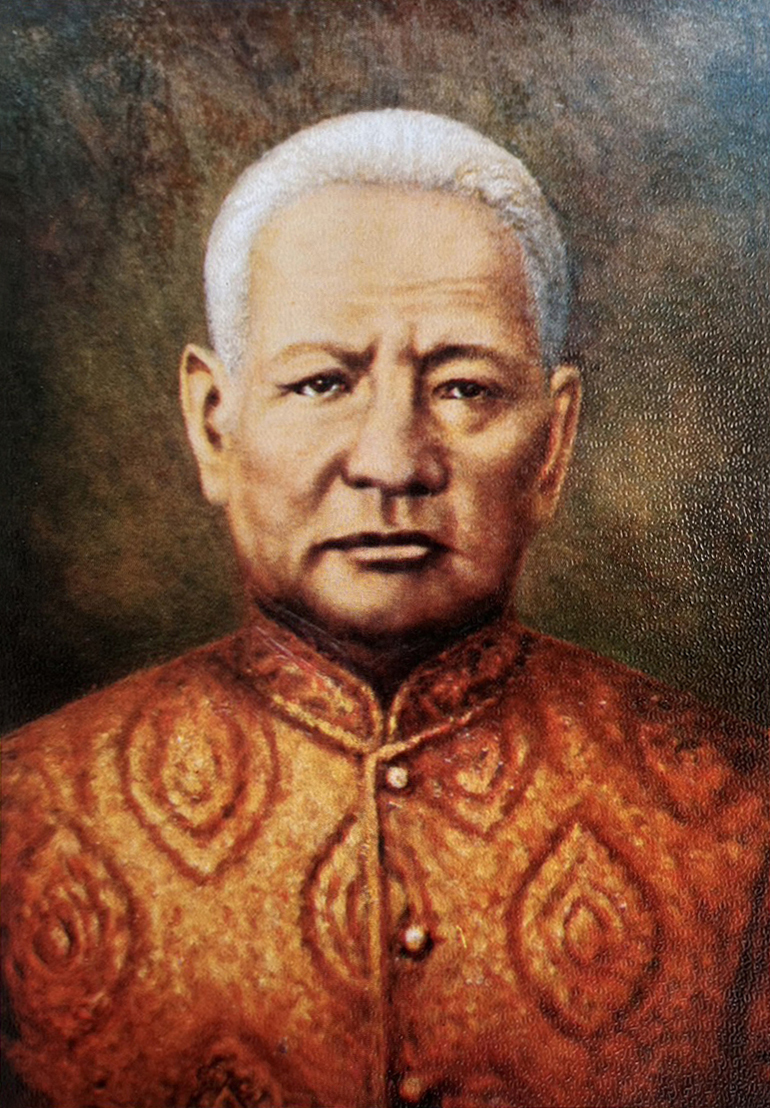
Somdet Chaophraya Prayurawong (Dit Bunnag), the king's regent kingdom-wide

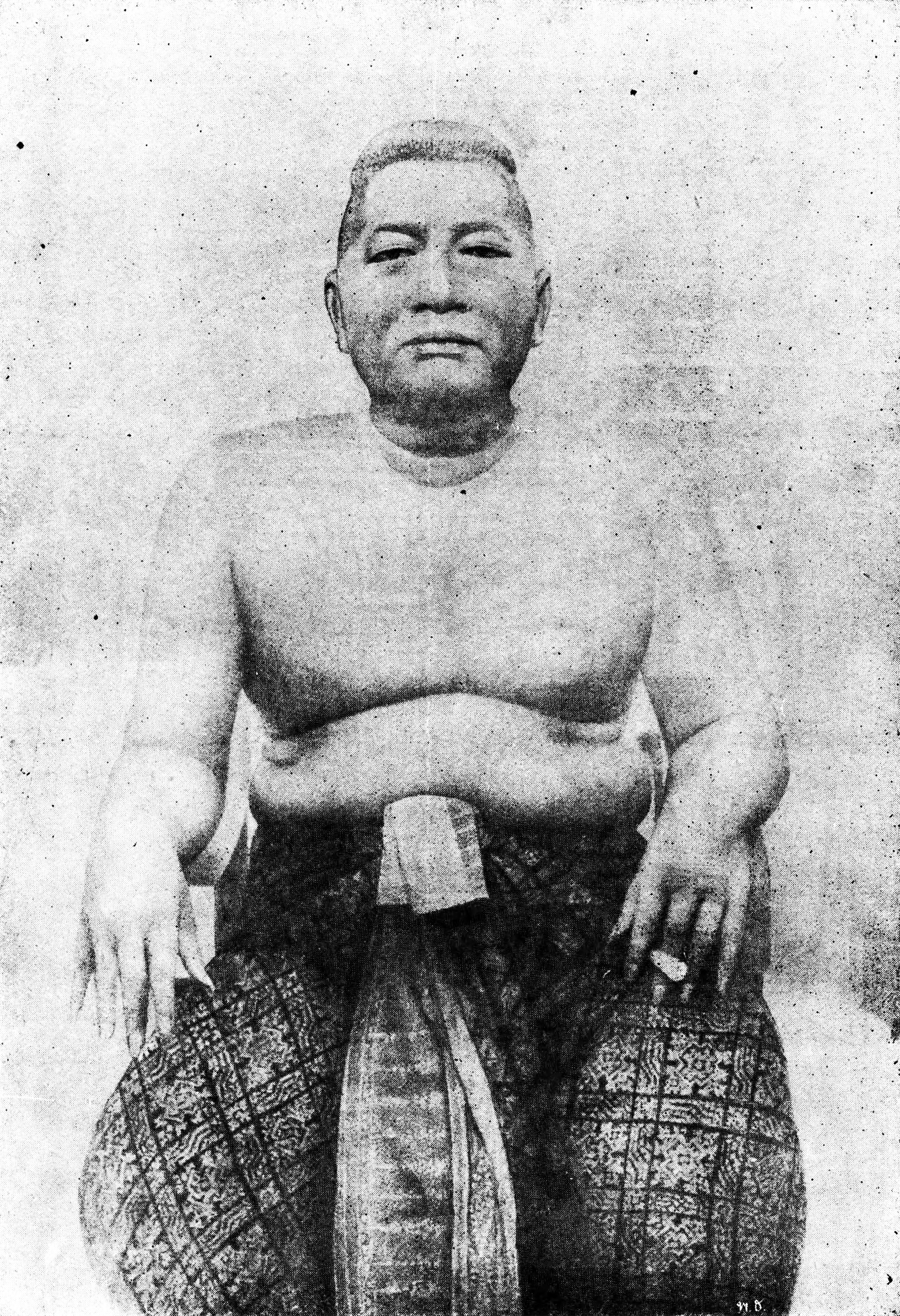
Somdet Chaophraya Phichaiyat (That Bunnag), the king's regent in Bangkok

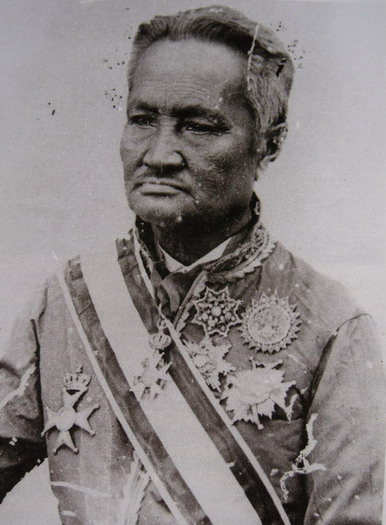
Chaophraya Si Suriyawong (Chuang Bunnag) the Samuha Kalahom or Prime Minister of Southern Siam

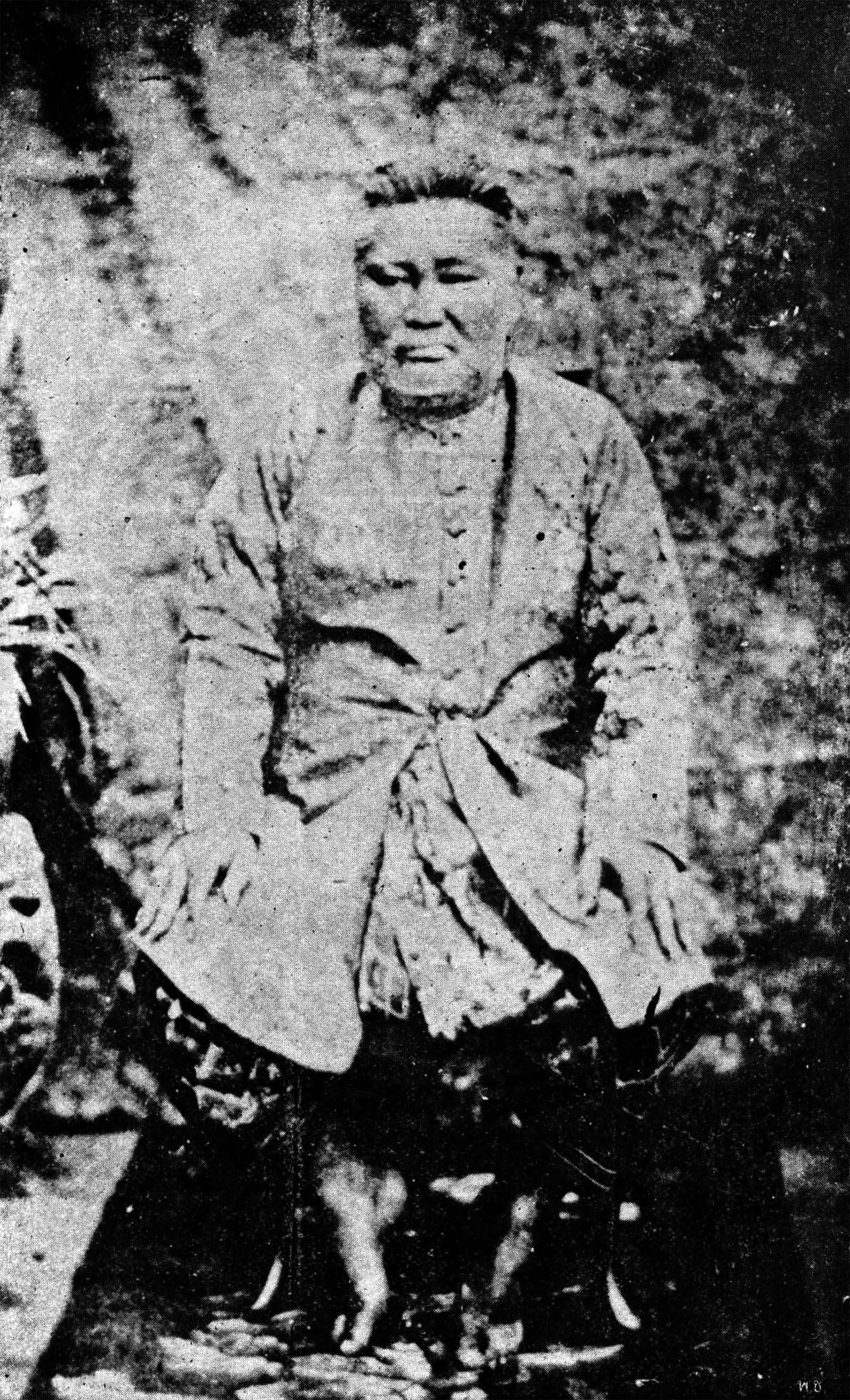
Chaophraya Rawiwong (Kham Bunnag) the Phrakhlang or Minister of Trade and Foreign Affairs.

== Contents ==
The regulations in short were:

1. British subjects were placed under consular jurisdiction—Britons could not be prosecuted by local Siamese authorities without consent from the British government. Thus, for the first time, Siam granted extraterritoriality to aliens from the United Kingdom.
2. British subjects were given the right to trade freely in all seaports and to reside permanently in Bangkok. They were to be allowed to buy and rent property in the environs of Bangkok; namely, in an area more than four miles from city walls but less than twenty-four hours' journey from the city (calculated from the average speed of Siamese watercraft). British subjects were also to be allowed to travel freely in the interior with passes provided by the consul.
3. Measurement duties were abolished and import and export duties were fixed.
  1. The import duty was fixed at three per cent for all articles, with two exceptions: opium was to be free of duty, but it had to be sold by the opium producer, and bullion was to be free of duty.
  2. Articles of export were to be taxed just once, whether the tax was called an inland tax, a transit duty, or an export duty.
4. British merchants were to be allowed to buy and sell directly with individual Siamese subjects without interference from any third party.
5. The Siamese government reserved the right to prohibit the export of salt, rice, and fish whenever these articles were deemed to be scarce in the country.

== Effects ==
The treaty's largest effect (after liberalising foreign trade) was the legalization of opium exports into Siam, which had previously been banned by the Siamese Crown. The treaty was similar in nature to the unequal treaties signed between the Qing government and various Western powers after the First and Second Opium Wars. The Siamese delegation was concerned about Bowring's intentions given the fact that negotiations between Siam and the British Rajah of Sarawak, Sir James Brooke, just five years earlier had ended badly; Brooke had threatened to dispatch his fleet to bombard Siamese ports after negotiations broke down. Despite this, Bowring established an amiable relationship with the Siamese delegation, being welcomed like foreign royalty and showered with pomp (including a 21-gun salute). Though Bowring had become frustrated by the obstinate attitudes of Qing diplomats, he relished the friendly attitude shown by the Siamese, which allowed for the treaty to be negotiated in far smoother terms than other treaties he negotiated.

The treaty eventually led other Western powers to sign their own bilateral treaties, based on the terms set by the Bowring Treaty. American diplomat Townsend Harris, while on his way to Japan, was delayed in Bangkok for a month by finalization of the Bowring Treaty, but had only to negotiate over a few minor points to convert it into the 1856 Treaty of Amity, Commerce, and Navigation with Siam. The Bowring Treaty in particular ensured that the Western powers would not intervene in Siam's internal affairs, and allowed for Siam to remain an independent nation (in contrast to its neighbors). The treaty is now credited by historians with ensuring the economic rejuvenation of Bangkok, as it created a framework in which multilateral trade could operate freely in Southeast Asia, notably between China, Singapore, and Siam.

== See also ==
- Thailand–United Kingdom relations
