= Wongsa Dhiraj Snid =

Siamese prince, physician and diplomat

Wongsa Dhiraj Snid; วงศาธิราชสนิท
- Prince of Siam
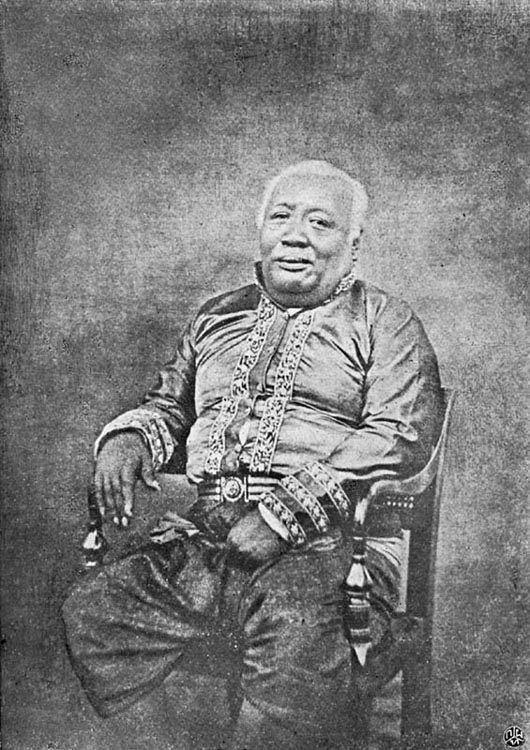
- Born: 9 July 1808; Bangkok, Siam
- Died: 14 August 1871 (aged 63); Bangkok, Siam
- Issue: 52 children
Names
- Phra Boromma Wong Ther Kromma Luang Wongsa Dhiraj Snid
- House: Chakri dynasty
- Father: Phutthaloetla Naphalai (Rama II)
- Mother: Prang Yai

Wongsa Dhiraj Snid (Thai: พระเจ้าบรมวงศ์เธอ กรมหลวงวงศาธิราชสนิท; 9 July 1808 – 14 August 1871) was a Thai medical doctor and diplomat, as well as a member of the reigning Chakri dynasty. An early adopter of Western-style medicine, he was the court physician for much of his life, and was known as the "Doctor Prince."

== Early life and family ==
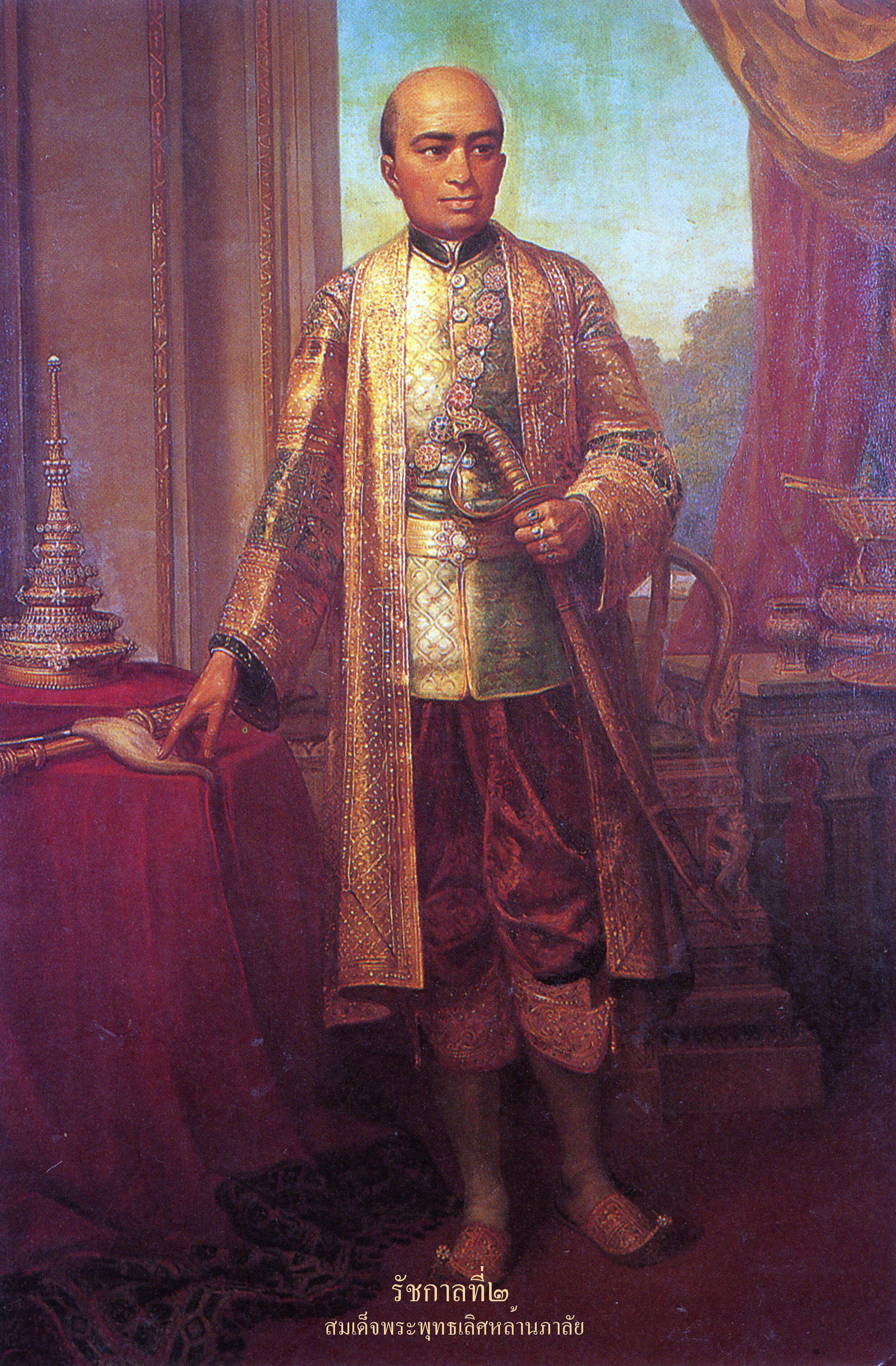
King Rama II of Siam, father of Wongsa Dhiraj Snid

Wongsa Dhiraj Snid was born in 1808, the 49th son of King Rama II of Siam, and given the title of Phra Ong Chao Nawama. His maternal grandparents were both traditional medical practitioners who served as court physicians during his father's reign. He was the half-brother of both Prince Thap, the future King Rama III, some twenty years his senior, and Prince Mongkut, the future King Rama IV.

Following Thai tradition, Wongsa Dhiraj Snid spent much of his early life learning statecraft, administration, and Buddhist teachings. He was ordained as a Buddhist monk as a young man. During his time as a monk, he was mentored by an uncle, Paramanuchitchinorot, the future Supreme Patriarch of Thailand. It is believed (though not known for certain) that he served an apprenticeship to learn traditional Thai medicine as well.

== Medical practice ==
Wongsa Dhiraj Snid followed the footsteps of his maternal family and became a physician, serving as the royal physician during the reigns of Rama III and Rama IV. He was first appointed chief of the Department of Royal Physicians at the age of 34. Though he was trained in traditional Thai medicine, he quickly adopted more Western forms of practice. He compiled a textbook of Thai medicinal herbs in a scientific style, and was the first Thai physician to utilize quinine in the treatment of malaria. He was granted honorary membership by a number of medical societies in both Europe and the United States.

== Diplomacy and war ==
Wongsa Dhiraj Snid's court duties were not confined to the practice of medicine; he also served as a diplomat and even a field commander. During the Burmese–Siamese War (1849–55), he led the Siamese forces that attacked Kengtung in 1854. He was one of the five Thai plenipotentiaries sent to negotiate the Bowring Treaty with the United Kingdom in 1855. He was also among the signatories of the Harris Treaty between Siam and the United States the following year.

== Legacy ==
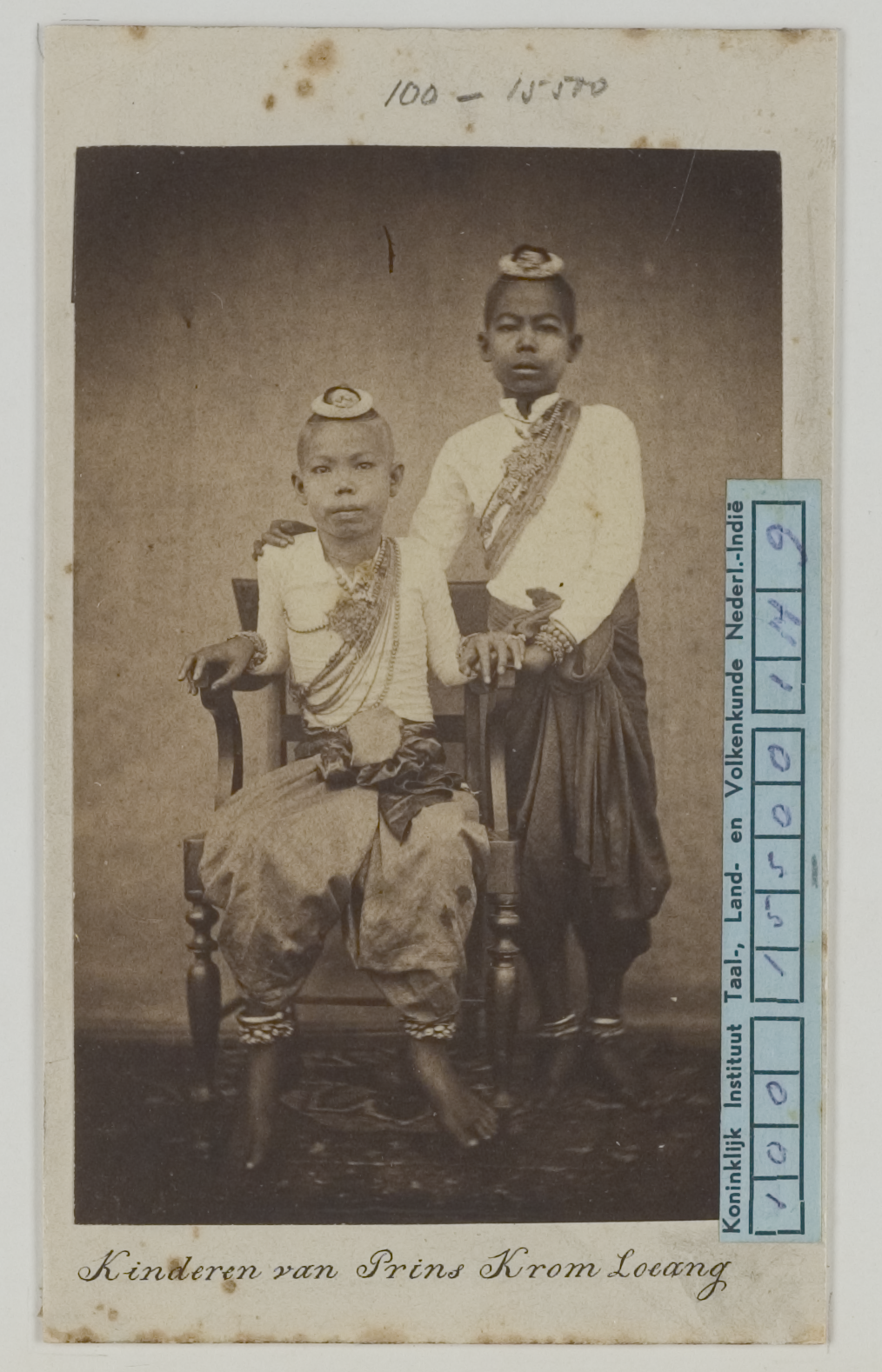
Sons of Prince Kromma Luang Wongsa Dhiraj Snid in 1862.

The descendants of Wongsa Dhiraj Snid took the name of Sanidwongse (sometimes spelled Sanidvongse, Snidvongs, or other variants). Several of his descendants, like him, served as royal physicians in Thailand. On the 200th anniversary of his birth in 2008, he was honored by UNESCO as a "Great World Personality", the 17th Thai to be so honored, and in 2009 he was featured on a Thai postage stamp.

Among his notable descendants are Queen Sirikit and her son King Rama X of Thailand, along with several other members of the Thai royal family, and prominent surgeon Kalyanakit Kitiyakara.
