= Bunnag family =

Siamese noble family

House of Bunnag ราชินิกุลบุนนาค
- Parent family: House of Sheikh Ahmad
- Current region: Bangkok
- Origin: Ayutthaya
- Founded: 1782
- Founder: Chao Phraya Akka Maha Sena (Bunnag)
- Titles: Regent of Siam (1851–1873); Somdet Chao Phraya; Chao Phraya
- Connected families: House of Chakri; House of Na Bangxang; House of Abhaiwongse; House of Na Nagara; Ahamadchula family Amatayakul family Amatayakul family Khotchaseni family Savetsila family

The Bunnag Family or House of Bunnag (Thai: บุนนาค; RTGS: Bunnak) is a Siamese aristocratic clan of Mon-Persian descent influential during the late Ayutthaya kingdom and early Rattanakosin period. The family was favored by Chakri monarchs.

Three of the four Somdet Chao Phraya came from the Bunnag family — Dit, styled Somdet Chao Phraya Borom Maha Prayurawongse; his younger brother Tat, styled Somdet Chao Phraya Borom Maha Pichaiyat; the eldest son Chuang, styled Somdet Chao Phraya Borom Sri Suriwongse. They have played key roles in government and foreign relations.

== History ==
=== Sheikh Ahmad ===
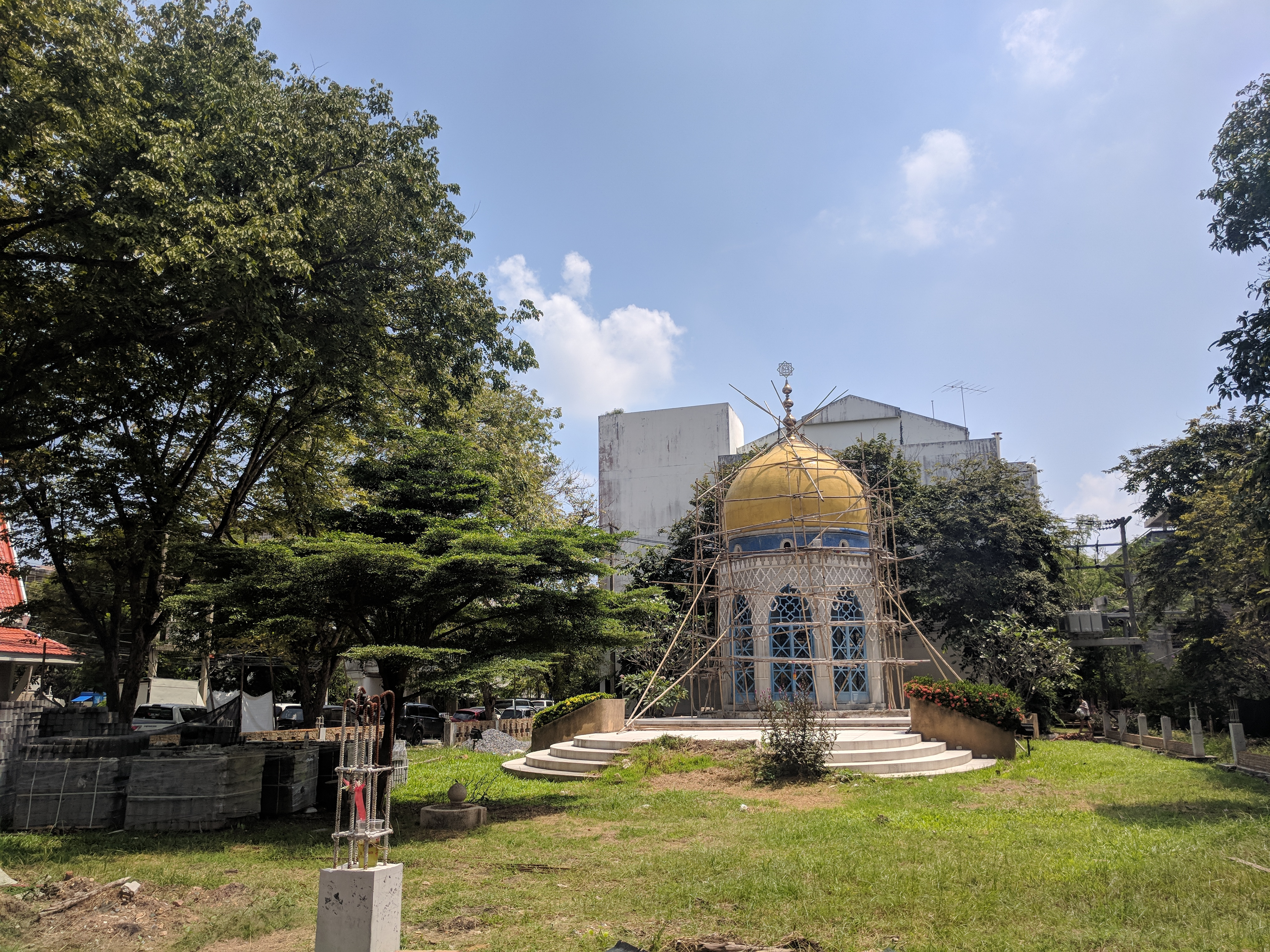
Tomb of Sheikh Ahmed of Qom, in Ayutthaya.

Sheikh Ahmad, a Persian merchant, along with his brother Muhamad Said and subordinates, settled in Siam around 1600. Sheikh Ahmad was a native of Qom in Safavid Iran, south of Tehran. He established himself as a rich merchant in Ayutthaya. There he entered the service of King Intharacha III (1611–1628) who appointed him as Chao Kromma Tha Khwa (เจ้ากรมท่าขวา; Lord of the Right Pier) to supervise traders from the West, i.e. Persians, Indians and Europeans. He was also appointed Chularatchamontri (จุฬาราชมนตรี; Minister

After subjugating a Japanese revolt under Yamada Nagamasa in 1611, Sheikh Ahmad became Samuha Nayok (First Prime Minister). Descendants of Sheikh Ahmad exerted control over Siamese politics, trade and foreign affairs. Many of them became Samuha Nayok. They also monopolized the post of Chularachamontri.

=== Settlement in Thonburi ===
A man called Bunnag was a descendant of Sheikh Ahmad. Bunnag married to Nuan, a daughter of wealthy Mon family from Bang Chang (also spelled Bang Xang; Thai: บางช้าง), situated near the mouth of Mae Klong River. Her sister Nak was the wife of Thongduang. He was then kinsmen to Thongduang. Though Thongduang emerged as a powerful noble in Thonburi, Bunnag stayed far from the bureaucracy due to his childhood conflicts with Taksin.

Thong Duang then became Ramathibodi (Rama I), the first king of the Chakri dynasty in 1782. During the Nine Armies' Wars, Bunnag led the Siamese forces against the Burmese. He was then promoted and eventually became the Samuha Kalahom as Chao Phraya Akka Maha Sena.

=== Rise of Prayurawongse ===
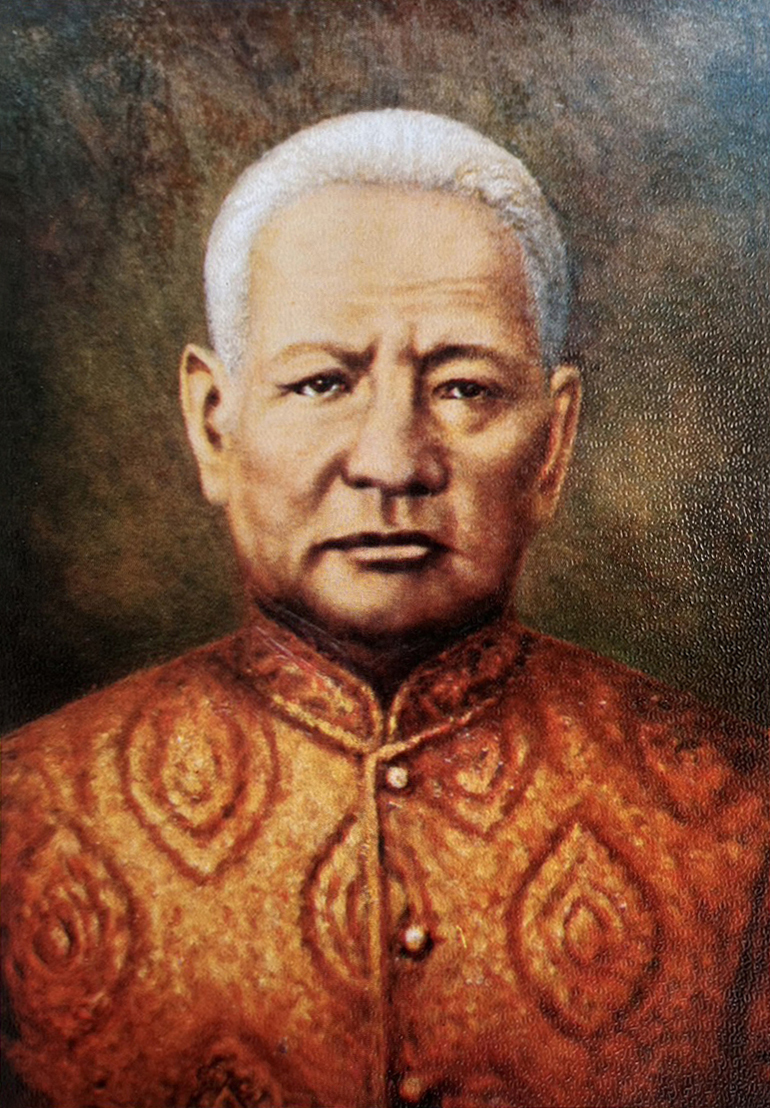
Somdet Chao Phraya Borom Maha Prayurawongse (Dit Bunnag)

Chao Phraya Akka Maha Sena was the primogenitor of the House of Bunnag. He sent his sons, including Dit and Tat, into the palace as the royal pages of Phutthayotfa Chulalok to gain an entrance into Siamese bureaucracy. Dit quickly rose to higher official ranks as Phutthaloetla Naphalai favored the nobles from the Bunnag family and Dit's maternal family, the Bangchang. Dit then became the minister of Kromma Tha, supervising trade and foreign affairs under King Nangklao.

He was offered the position of Samuha Kalahom (Second Prime Minister) by the king, but Dit declined, saying that prime ministers died early. He then became Samuha Kalahom instead.

During the Siamese–Vietnamese Wars, Dit led the Siamese forces to Vietnam and imposed a naval blockade on Saigon. The campaigns were successful, however, and the war ended in 1845. With the death of Bodindecha in 1849, Dit remained the only powerful noble in the court.

Dit played a key role in the ascension of Mongkut, whether or not Nangklao intended to give the throne to his half-brother. The legend is that Nangklao wanted his son, Prince Annop, to succeed him, even giving Annop the bracelet passed down from his grandfather Phutthayotfa Chulalok. However, Dit switched the bracelet for a forged one, so the genuine one was not passed to Prince Annop. Dit lobbied for Mongkut, a monk of 27 years, to succeed the throne.

In 1851, when Mongkut had succeeded the throne, he made Dit Somdet Chao Phraya Borom Maha Prayurawongse and regent in the kingdom. Prayurawongse's brother, That, became Somdet Chao Phraya Borom Maha Pichaiyat and regent in Bangkok. The Somdet Chao Phraya title was the highest noble title, rivaling royalty. The first to hold the title, Maha Kshatriyaseuk, had become the first monarch of Chakri dynasty.

Mongkut gave much of his power to the regents he appointed. Prayurawongse was also competent in trade and foreign affairs and crucial to negotiating the Bowring Treaty.

=== Sri Suriwongse ===
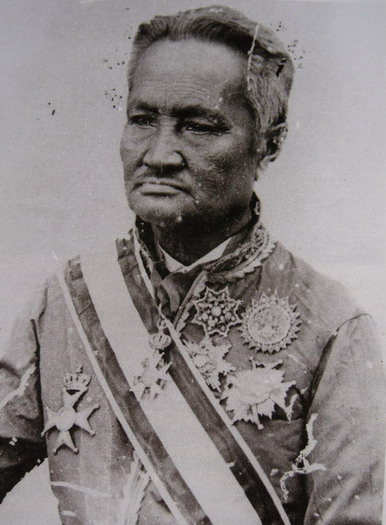
Somdet Chao Phraya Borom Maha Sri Suriwongse (Chuang Bunnag)

Somdet Chao Phraya Borom Maha Sri Suriwongse (Thai: สมเด็จเจ้าพระยาบรมมหาศรีสุริยวงศ์; Chuang Bunnag) was a prominent 19th-century Thai figure and served as the regent during the early years of the reign of King Chulalongkorn.

The eldest son of Dit Bunnag (Prayurawongse, สมเด็จเจ้าพระยาบรมมหาประยูรวงศ์) and Thanphuying Chan, Chuang was well educated. King Mongkut made him Samuha Kalahom, one of the two prime ministers of Old Siam.

After the death of King Mongkut in 1868, his young son Prince Chulalongkorn became the new monarch. However, as the new king was underage, Sri Suriwongse was named as regent, a post he held until 1873. The Front Palace Crisis of 1874-5 changed the power dynamic in Siam, after which both Bunnag and noble influence waned.

Sri Suriwongse died in 1883 in Ratchaburi. He was also the first Thai to have a life insurance policy after Chulalongkorn granted foreign companies permission to extend their insurance business into Siam.

His son Won Bunnag succeeded him as Samuha Kalahom and also held the title Chao Phraya Surawong Waiyawat.
