= Somdet Chao Phraya Borom Maha Sri Suriwongse =

Regent of Siam (1868–1873)

Somdet Chao Phraya Borom Maha Sri Suriyawongse NR PCh PCh PM
- สมเด็จเจ้าพระยาบรมมหาศรีสุริยวงศ์
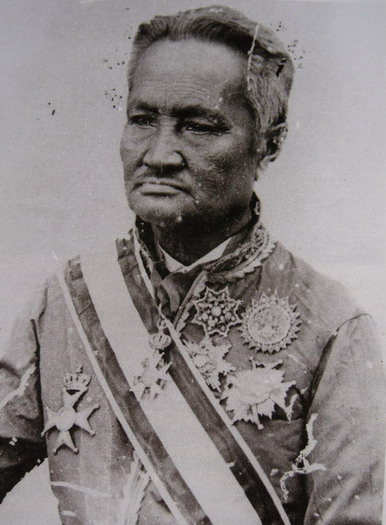
- Formal portrait, c. 1880

Regent of Siam
- In office 1 October 1868 – 16 November 1873
- Monarch: Chulalongkorn (Rama V)

Samuha Kalahom (Chief Minister of Southern Siam)
- In office 1855–1869
- Monarch: Mongkut (Rama IV)
- Preceded by: Prayurawongse
- Succeeded by: Surawongwaiwat

Commander of the Royal Palace Navy
- In office 1851–1869
- Monarch: Mongkut (Rama IV)
- Preceded by: Inaugural holder
- Succeeded by: Surawongwaiwat

Personal details
- Born: 23 December 1808 Siam
- Died: 19 January 1883 (aged 74) Ratchaburi, Siam
- Spouse: Than Phu Ying Klin Bunnag
- Parents: Prayurawongse (father); Than Phu Ying Chan Bunnag (mother)

Somdet Chao Phraya Borom Maha Sri Suriwongse (Note: Thai: สมเด็จเจ้าพระยาบรมมหาศรีสุริยวงศ์, RTGS: Somdet Chao Phraya Borom Maha Si Suriwong, Thai pronunciation: [sǒm.dèt tɕâw.pʰrá.jaː bɔː.rɔm má.hǎː sǐː sù.rí.woŋ]) 23 December 1808 – 19 January 1883), born Chuang Bunnag (Note: Thai: ช่วง บุนนาค, RTGS: Chuang Bunnak, Thai pronunciation: [tɕʰûaŋ bun.nâːk]) was a leading Siamese noble and statesman who served as the Regent of Siam during the early reign of King Chulalongkorn.

== Biography ==
Chuang Bunnag was born on 23 December 1808 to Tish Bunnag and his main wife Lady Chan, who was a daughter of Chao Phraya Pollathep Thongin, at Chuang's grandfather's residence off the southern wall of the Grand Palace near modern Wat Pho, Phra Nakhon District. Chuang was a member of Bunnag family who had descended from Sheikh Ahmad, the Persian minister of King Prasat Thong. (His lineage had converted to Theravada Buddhism in the mid-eighteenth century.) In 1818, the Grand Palace expanded south and Bunnags moved to their new residence on the West bank of Chao Phraya River in modern Thonburi District. Chuang's father, Tish, was later invested as Chao Phraya Phraklang the Minister of Trade.

Chuang began his career by entering the royal palace as one of the royal pages by around 1828. He was traditionally educated at Wat Pho. With his father being the Minister of Trade, Chuang became acquainted to royal trades and exposed to Western sciences. He was given title Luang Sit Nai Wen (Thai: หลวงสิทธิ์นายเวร). He was said to be able to communicate in English. Chuang rose through ranks in the Royal Household Office. His main pursuit was shipbuilding. Chuang built a brigantine called Ariel, the first Western rigged ship ever built in Siam, at Chantaburi in 1835 where his father had been assigned to build fortifications. Chuang presented Ariel to King Rama III who named the ship Klaew Klang Samutr (Thai: แกล้วกลางสมุทร). Chuang invited Dan Beach Bradley to board his ship to Chantaburi in October 1835. Bradley called Chuang "Luang Nai Sit" and mentioned that in front of Chuang's house there was an engraving in English; "This is Luang Nai Sit's house - welcome friends." Chuang was close to Prince Isaret Rangsan (later vice-king Pinklao) who shared Chuang's enthusiasms in shipbuilding and British-American culture.

Chuang was appointed Chameun Waiworanat, a high-ranking royal page. In Siamese–Vietnamese War (1841–1845), King Rama III commissioned Prince Isaret Rangsan and Chuang Bunnag to bring five Siamese rigged warships to attack Hà Tiên in January 1842. Prince Isaret Rangsan stayed at Phú Quốc and Chuang led the assault into Hà Tiên and sent Cambodian regiment to take Cô Tô mountain. After one week of bombardments, the reinforced Vietnamese did not yield. Prince Isaret Rangsan and Chuang Bunnag decided to retreat due to unfavorable winds.

=== Bowring Treaty and Rise to Power ===
The British had been granted trade permissions in the 1826 Burney Treaty but much of traditional royal monopoly was retained. Trade with Westerners had been monopolized by Phra Klang Sinka or Royal Storage Department since 1511. All Western cargoes were monitored by the Phra Klang Sinka who collected tariffs as the source of royal court revenue. The Burney Treaty of 1826 allowed British merchants to trade directly with the local Siamese but they were still subjected to the traditional tariff that measured on the width of the arriving merchant ship and the British residing in Siam were subjected to Siamese laws. After the First Opium War, the British was eager to demand free trade in Siam. James Brooke the governor of Labuan arrived in Bangkok in September 1850. King Rama III elevated Chuang to Phraya Sri Suriyawongse and assigned him to receive Brooke. However, as the king had been ill, no further agreement was reached.

Upon the coronation of King Mongkut in April 1851, Prince Isaret Rangsan was made the Vice-King Pinklao at the Front Palace and Chuang's father the Phraklang was made Somdet Chao Phraya Borom Maha Prayurawongse. Chuang was also made Chao Phraya Sri Suriyawongse (Thai: เจ้าพระยาศรีสุริยวงศ์) the deputy Kalahom the Minister of Southern Siam. His father held the position of Samuha Kalahom de jure as Sri Suriyawongse had already taken his father's responsibilities in the Kalahom. Sri Suriyawongse moved to his new residence in Khlong San District, where he maintained a private dock and continued to engage in shipbuilding.

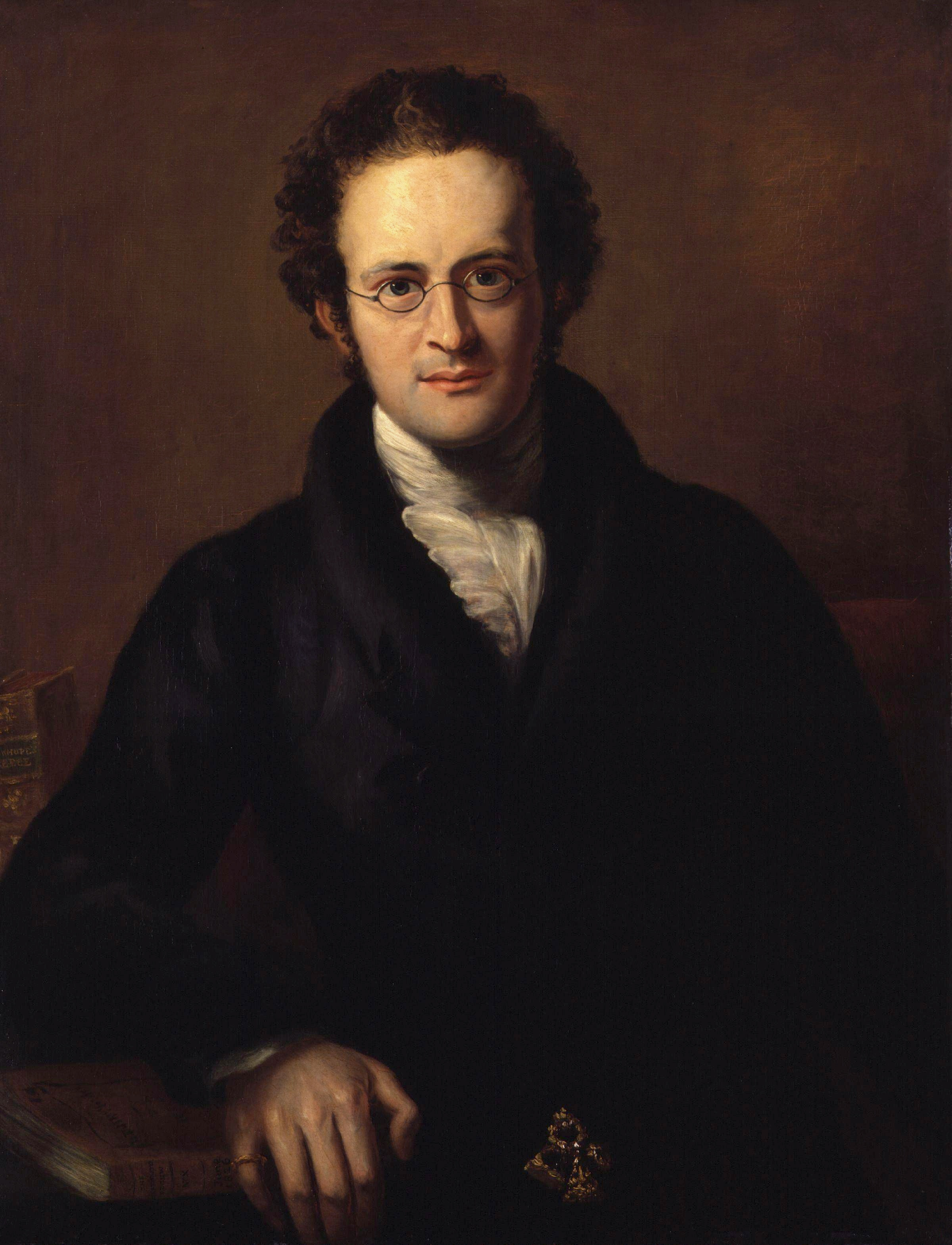
John Bowring the governor of Hong Kong arrived at Bangkok and the Bowring Treaty was signed in April 1855, making a huge impact on the Siamese economy.

John Bowring arrived in April 1855 and Sri Suriyawongse received him with pomp ceremonies. His father Prayurawongse strongly opposed British proposals on free trade issues but King Mongkut and Sri Suriyawongse had realized that Siam was in no position to resist British demands. The Bowring Treaty was achieved through Sri Suriyawongse's mediation with his father. The traditional ship-width tariff was abolished. The free trade and extraterritoriality was granted to the British and the four hundred years of royal monopoly on Western trade was ended.

Sri Suriyawongse's father Prayurawongse died in April 1855, one month after the Bowring Treaty. Sri Suriyawongse was officially invested as Samuha Kalahom the Prime Minister of Southern Siam and became de facto in charge of Siamese foreign affairs. Sri Suriyawongse was then called by the honorific Pana Hua Chao Than (Thai: พณหัวเจ้าท่าน). Bowring Treaty was the first of "unequal treaties" that had been agreed by Siam with Western nations. The free trades and extraterritoriality was granted to the United States (Harris) in May 1856 and France (Montigny) in August 1856, all of which Sri Suriyawongse and Prince Wongsa Dhiraj Snid played leading roles.

In the reign of King Mongkut, Siam established the first standing navy and was divided into the Royal Navy and the Front Palace Navy. Sri Suriyawongse became the first ever Commander of the Royal Navy while the Front Palace Navy was commanded by Vice-King Pinklao himself. In 1860, King Mongkut ordered Sri Suriyawongse to lead the construction of Phra Nakhon Khiri at Phetchaburi to be a detached palace.

=== Cambodian Border Dispute ===
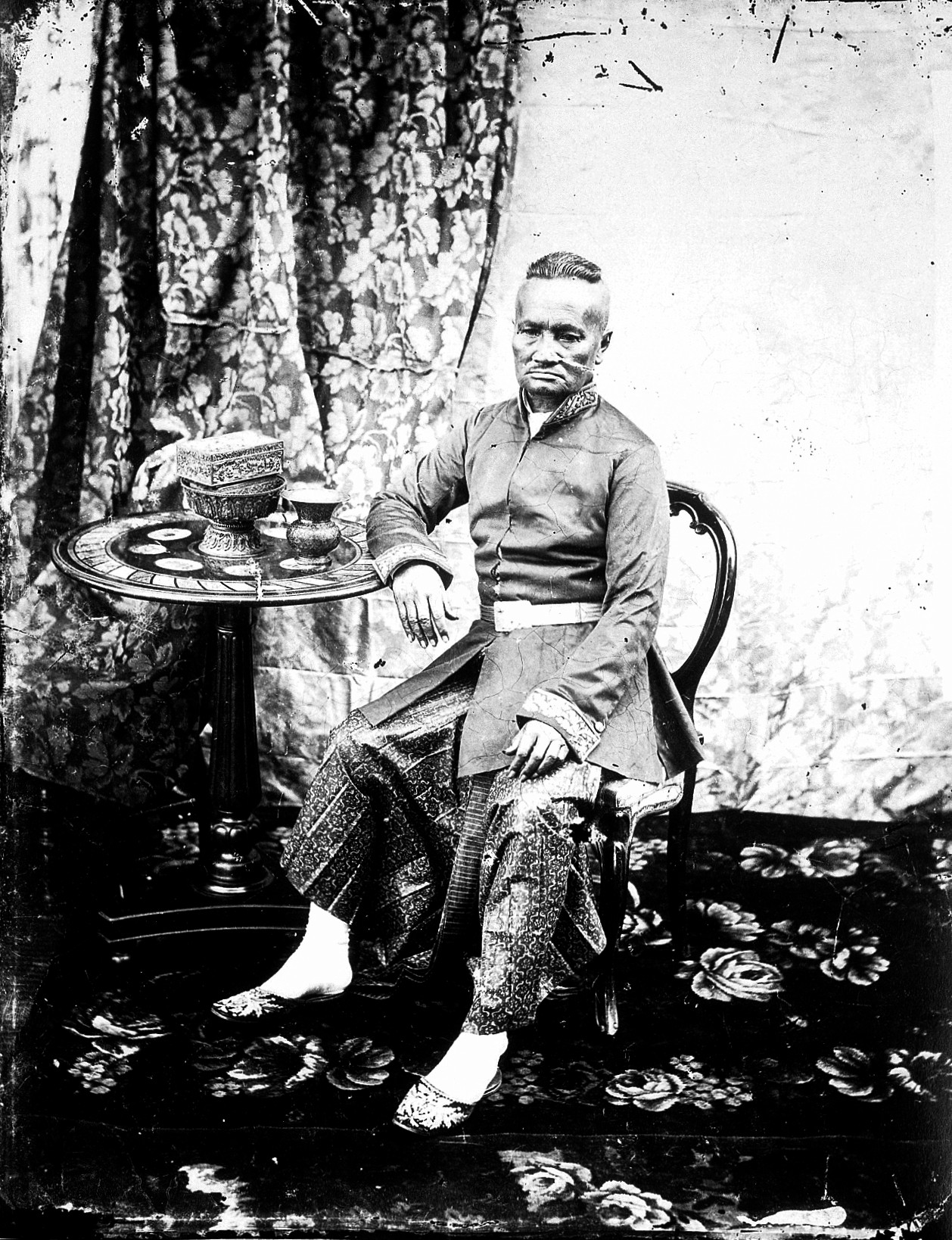
Sri Suriwongse in 1865

Cambodia had been traditionally under Siamese suzerainty. In August 1863, La Grandière the French admiral had King Norodom of Cambodia signed a treaty that put Cambodia under French protectorate without Siam's acknowledgement. Sri Suriyawongse responded by having King Norodom secretly signed another treaty that recognized Siamese suzerainty over Cambodia. Gabriel Aubaret arrived at Bangkok in April 1864 to be the French consul and started negotiation with Sri Suriyawongse about French-Siamese border proclamations. The Straits Times published the secret Cambodian-Siamese treaty on 20 August 1864, much to the embarrassment of Aubaret who had been unaware of the treaty. Aubaret went directly to King Mongkut to denounce "Kalahom" Sri Suriyawongse. The agreements were delayed and resumed in April 1865 but this treaty was not ratified at Paris as France would recognized Siamese rule over "Siamese Laos". Siam decided to dispatch a mission to Paris in 1865 led by Sri Suriyawongse's son Won Bunnag and the treaty was finally concluded in July 1867, in which Siam recognized French protectorate of Cambodia while in turn France accepted Siamese rule over "Inner Cambodia" (Northwestern Cambodia; Battambang, Siemreap and Sisophon, which had been annexed to Siamese direct rule since 1795 and would be ceded to French Indochina later in 1907.).

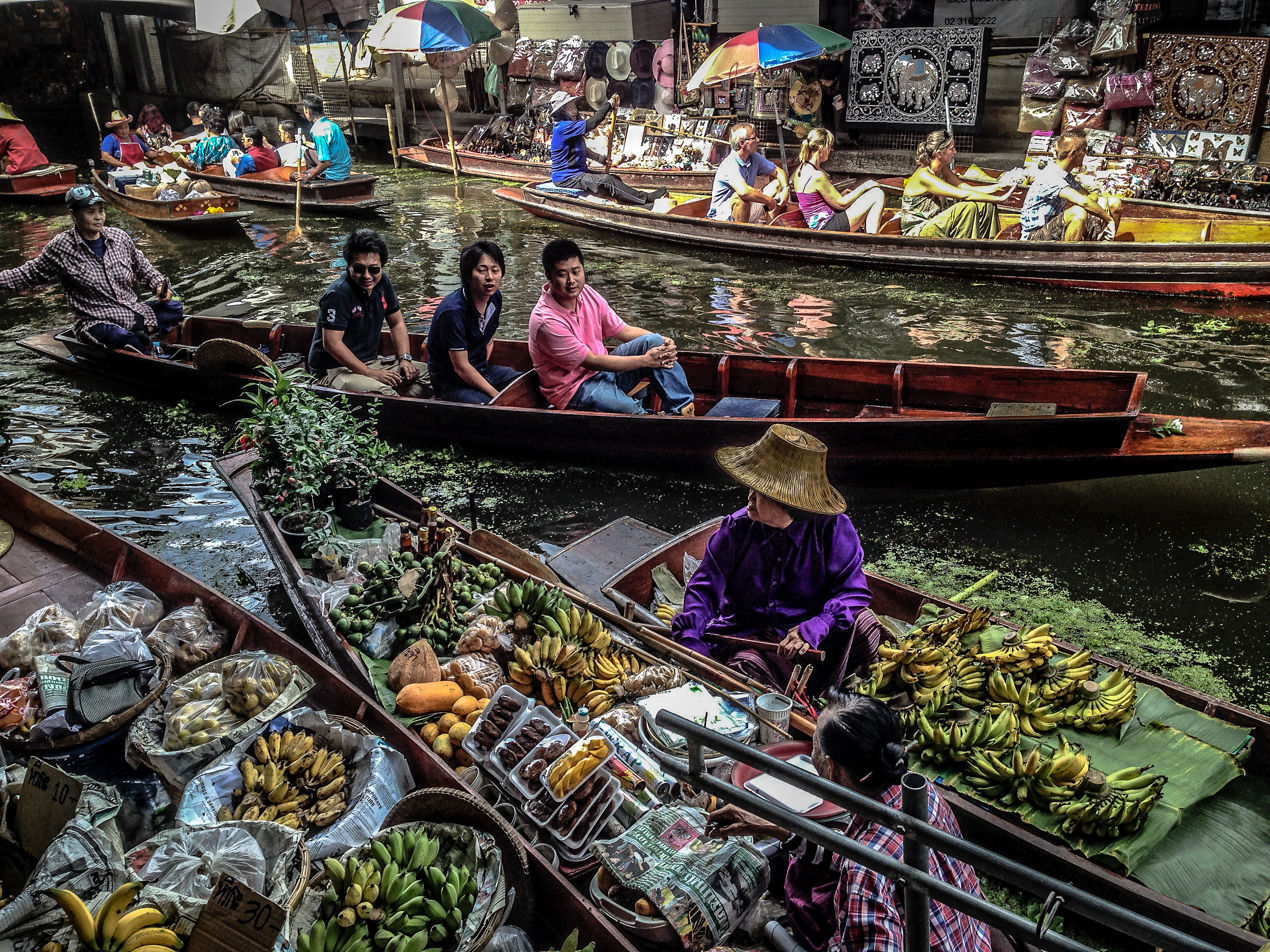
Damnoen Saduak Canal was constructed by Chao Phraya Sri Suriyawongse in 1866–1868. It hosts the famous Damnoen Saduak Floating Market at Damnoen Saduak District, Ratchaburi Province.

In 1866, King Mongkut commissioned Sri Suriyawongse to oversee the construction of a 35-km long canal that connected Tha Chin River and Mae Klong River to facilitate commuting into Western Siam. The construction was finished in 1868 and was named Damnoen Saduak Canal. As Sri Suriyawongse had spent his own wealth on the construction of the canal, King Mongkut allowed the Bunnags to settle along the canal. In August 1868, Sri Suriyawongse organized the royal outing of King Mongkut to Wa Keo, Prachuap Khiri Khan Province with his son Prince Chulalongkorn to observe the Solar eclipse of August 18, 1868 calculated by the king.

=== Regency ===
After the demise of his father in 1855 and the demise of Vice-King Pinklao in 1866, Sri Suriyawongse emerged as the most powerful courtier. After the solar eclipse event, King Mongkut was exposed to malaria and died in October 1868. Sri Suriyawongse held a council of royal princes and top ministers. The council affirmed that Prince Chulalongkorn, who was fifteen years old, would succeed the throne and Sri Suriyawongse was to be appointed Regent during the minority of the new king. However, Sri Suriyawongse wished Vice-King Pinklao's son Prince Wichaichan be appointed as the Front Palace or heir presumptive. Prince Vorachak objected this, saying that the rights of appointing an heir belonged to the king, but Sri Suriyawongse prevailed. Sri Suriyawongse was succeeded as Samuha Kalahom and as the Commander of Royal Navy by his son Won Bunnag who was made Chao Phraya Surawong Waiyawat in 1869.

In the 1870s, during his Regency, Sri Suriyawongse wielded a great power. King Chulalongkorn later described the situation to Crown Prince Vajiravudh in July 1893; "All of the princes were under Somdet Chao Phraya's power".

=== Retirement and Demise ===
At the end of his regency in September 1873 when King Chulalongkorn had reached maturity, Sri Suriyawongse was invested the Somdet Chao Phraya Borom Maha Sri Suriyawongse with honors equal to a prince, the same rank his father had previously received – the highest rank a Siamese noble had ever attained during the Rattanakosin period. Sri Suriyawongse retired to his new estate in Ratchaburi where he spent last nine years of his life.

The retired Sri Suriyawongse became involved in the politics again in an event known as "Front Palace Crisis" in December 1874. Stand-offs between King Chulalongkorn and Prince Wichaichan the Front Palace led to the latter taking refuge in British consulate. Thomas George Knox the British consul-general had been known to support Vice-King Pinklao's lineage and to prevent British intervention King Chulalongkorn requested Sri Suriyawongse for aid. Sri Suriyawongse arrived at Bangkok and managed to convince Prince Wichaichan to leave British consulate.

In January 1883, Sri Suriyawongse fell seriously ill at his estate at Ratchaburi. His eldest son Won Bunnag had him transported in a steamboat from Ratchaburi to Bangkok for treatment but Sri Suriyawongse died en route at Amphoe Krathum Baen, Samut Sakhon Province on 19 January 1883, aged 74. His funeral was held in manners and honors of a royalty.

== Family and Issues ==
Sri Suriyawongse married Lady Klin Bunnag who was also his half-cousin (her father was Prayurawongse's half brother) and became his main wife. He had a son and three daughters with her including;

- Won Bunnag, later Chao Phraya Surawong Waiyawat (1828–1888), succeeded his father as Samuha Kalahom in 1869.

He had another two wives but did not have any more children.

== Royal decorations ==
Sri Suriwongse received the following royal decorations in the honours system of Thailand:

- Knight of the Ancient and Auspicious Order of the Nine Gems – B.E. 2412 (C.E. 1869–1870)
- Knight Grand Cross (First Class) of the Most Illustrious Order of Chula Chom Klao – B.E. 2416 (C.E. 1873–1874) (Note: Highest rank of the order in that era.)
- Knight Grand Cross (First Class) of the Most Exalted Order of the White Elephant – c. B.E. 2412–2416 (C.E. 1869–1974)
- Knight Grand Cross (First Class) of the Most Noble Order of the Crown of Thailand – B.E. 2419 (C.E. 1876–1877)
