= Thalang =

Thalang may refer to:

- Thalang, a historical name of Phuket island
  - See History of Phuket
- Thalang district, a modern administrative division of Phuket province
