= History of Phuket =

Phuket is the largest island in modern Thailand, locating in Southern Thailand on the western coast in the Andaman Sea. Historically at the fringe of Thai sphere of influence, Phuket has a unique place in Thai history, as its natural maritime wilderness hid lucrative tin resources that attracted both locals and foreigners who competed for control over the island, also a battleground for intensive Burmese–Siamese Wars, later becoming a Hokkien Chinese labor immigration entrepôt in tin mining industry and eventually a world tourism hub.

== Historiography ==
Locating on the southern frontier of Thai sphere of influence, far from Thai historical centers such as Ayutthaya and Bangkok, closer to the Malay archipelago, events in Phuket were rarely recorded by the mainstream official royal Siamese chronicles. Native records about Phuket are scarce and none of them described events prior to the eighteenth century. Most of early history of Phuket can only be constructed from Western records by various foreigners such as the Dutch, the British and the French, who occasionally visited or had businesses in the Phuket island in the seventeenth to eighteenth centuries. Dearth of Phuket indigenous records may be attributed to the Burmese destruction of all settlements on Phuket in 1810, which presumably destroyed any historical documents and clues of the island.

The oldest extant native Thai historiography about the history of Phuket is dated to 1841, a small excerpt recounting a list of governors of Thalang or Phuket from around mid-eighteenth century to that time. Phraya Thalang Roek the governor of Thalang, relying on oral accounts of some elderly people of Phuket, provided a slightly more detailed account of History of Phuket, published by Prince Damrong in 1914 as Phongsawadan Mueang Thalang ("Chronicles of Thalang").

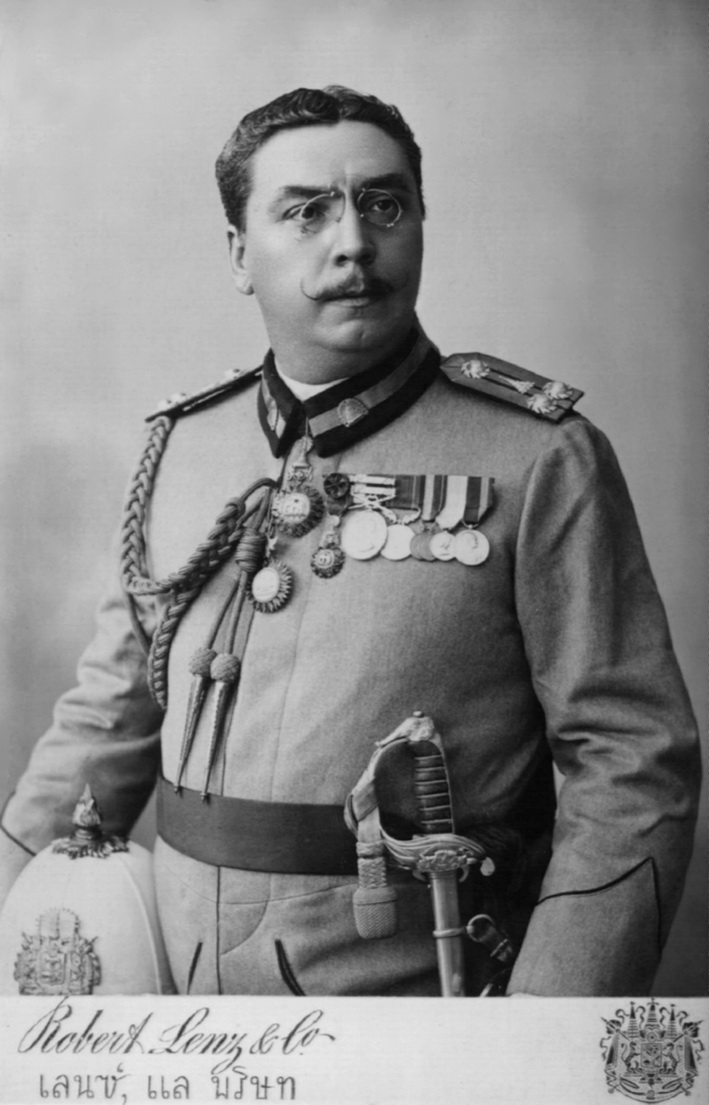
Gerolamo Emilio Gerini or Phra Sarasat Phonlakhan composed Historical Retrospect of Junkceylon Island in 1905.

Gerolamo Emilio Gerini, an Italian man known by Siamese title Phra Sarasat Phonlakhan (พระสารสาสน์พลขันธ์), served as a military instructor at Chulachomklao Royal Military Academy from 1897 to 1905. Gerini studied Siamese history and culture, composing Historical Retrospect of Junkceylon Island in 1905, the first modern historical narration of Phuket, republished in 1986 under Siam Society.

== Names of Phuket ==
For most of its history, Phuket was known as "Junkceylon" in Western sources. The term Junkceylon came from Portuguese attested terms Jonsalam, Jonsalan or Junsalão of the sixteenth century. These terms were derived from the Malay term "Ujong Salang", meaning the "Cape of Salang", referring to the southern tip of the island. The name "Salang" was apparently related to native calling of the island "Chalang" or Thalang", which was adopted by the Thais to call the island. The name Salang, Chalang or Thalang did not have translatable meanings in both Thai and Malay languages, in which Gerini theorized to be derived from indigenous Austroasiatic language spoken by Semang Negrito people of the Malay peninsula. Merong Mahawangsa the Chronicles of Kedah, dated to late eighteenth century to early nineteenth century, called Phuket "Pulau Salang" or "Island of Salang".

The name "Phuket" came from the Malay term Bukit ("Mountain"), substantiated into Thai term "Phukej" (ภูเก็จ) from Phu ("Mountain") and Kej ("Diamond"), meaning "Diamond Mountain", which was related to Siamese title of the governors of Thalang "Phraya Phetkhiri" (พระยาเพชรคีรีฯ, "Lord of the Diamond Mountain"). Thalang and Phukej are two distinct settlements on the island. Thalang was the preferred term by pre-modern Siamese government as it was the main administrative center, locating in various shifting places in the center-northern part of the island, while Phukej began as a small settlement on the southern half of the island around late eighteenth century under jurisdiction of Thalang. With the foundation of modern Phukej town in 1827, the Phukej city grew rapidly and exponentially as a tin mining hub, attracting Hokkien Chinese tin mine laborers. After mid-nineteenth century, Phukej became the preferred term to call the island. Official spelling changed from Phukej to Phuket in early twentieth century.

== Early history ==
=== Nakhon Si Thammarat ===
There are two Tamnan or histories, Tamnan Mueang Nakhon Si Thammarat (History of Nakhon Si Thammarat) and Tamnan Phrathat Mueang Nakhon Si Thammarat (History of Phrathat of Nakhon Si Thammarat), which provide semi-legendary narration of history of the area of Southern Thailand from thirteenth to seventeenth centuries, believed to be composed around the later half of the seventeenth century, discovered by modern Thai historian Prince Damrong and published during the 1930s. According to these Theravadin Buddhist Tamnans, King Si Thammasok established the city of Nakhon Si Thammarat as the center of his new Nakhon Si Thammarat Kingdom around mid-thirteenth century. With the foundation, King Si Thammasok also organized twelve Naksat zodiac satellite cities to be under the rule of Nakhon Si Thammarat. The term Naksat, from Sanskrit Nakshatra, referred instead to the Chinese zodiac.

Modern seal of Nakhon Si Thammarat Province depicting Phrathat surrounded by the twelve Naksat zodiacs.

Twelve Naksat satellite cities subordinating to Nakhon Si Thammarat, each assigned with a zodiac emblem, are Saiburi (Rat), Pattani (Ox), Kelantan (Tiger), Pahang (Rabbit), Kedah (Dragon), Phatthalung (Snake), Trang (Horse), Chumphon (Goat), Banthay Smoe (Monkey, theorized to be Krabi), Sa U-Lau (Rooster), Takua Pa (Dog) and Kraburi (Pig). These cities covered modern area from Southern Thailand to northern Malaysian states. In one version, Takua Pa was replaced with "Takua-Thalang" (ตะกั่วถลาง), which could either mean Takua Pa or Thalang, suggesting that the Phuket area was under control of Nakhon Si Thammarat Kingdom, as did much of Southern Thailand. However, this seventeenth-century account lacks supporting collaborative evidences from other sources.

=== Sukhothai and Early Ayutthaya ===
In the Ramkhamhaeng Stele, dated to 1292, Nakhon Si Thammarat is named as one of subordinate cities of Sukhothai Kingdom. The Tamnan suggests that a King of Sukhothai had come to subjugate Nakhon Si Thammarat. Therefore, the Thai Sukhothai kingdom had at least some influences over Southern Thai region in the fourteenth century but it is dubious that Sukhothai had solidified control over Southern Thailand or Malay peninsula as a whole.

Nakhon Si Thammarat and Southern Thailand was incorporated into Ayutthaya kingdom by fifteenth century. Towns on the Andaman Coast were not mentioned in the list of peripheral cities in Phra Aiyakarn Tamnaeng Na Thaharn Huamueang, which was complied in under King Trailokkanat, which included Nakhon Si Thammarat, Chumphon, Chaiya and Phatthalung as Ayutthayan authority was concentrated on Gulf of Siam side of Malay peninsula. According to Jeremias van Vliet's Chronicles of the Ayuthian Dynasty (1640), King Borommaracha III of Ayutthaya went on his leisure journey to "Tjongh Tjelungh" where he died, presumably in 1491. Fernão Mendes Pinto passed by the port of "Juncalan" in 1539. Pinto called the Tenasserim Coast the "Coast of Juncalan". In 1580, Ralph Fitch passed by "Junsalaon" on his sea journey from Pegu to Malacca.

Earliest recognized inhabitants of Phuket seemed to be the Malays. Orang Laut sea nomads, called Saletters in Dutch sources, also patrolled the area. In October 1592, Edmund Baker from the fleet of Sir James Lancaster visited the "kingdome of Junsaloam", where Baker sent a Portuguese man to speak to the inhabitants in Malay language; "Here we sent our souldier, which the captaine of the aforesaid galion had left behind him with us, because he had the Malaian language to deale with the people for pitch,". This was the first recorded encounter between visitor and native inhabitant of Phuket.

== Dutch activities in Phuket ==
=== Arrival of the Dutch in Phuket ===
Tenasserim Hills was abundant in tin, which had been exported from various seaports of the Malay peninsula, attracting foreign merchants to trade tin in exchange for their goods. In the early seventeenth century, there had been a flourishing trans-Bay-of-Bengal trade, in which South Indian merchants from Coromandel Coast would trade for tin in the Malay peninsula in exchange for Indian textiles brought with them. In the aftermath of Dutch conquest of Malacca in 1641, Malacca served as the foothold for expansion of Dutch commercial power in the region. As tin became a key commodity, the Dutch sought to take control and monopolize over this trans-Bay-of-Bengal tin trade, at the expense of their competitors the South Indian and Acehnese merchants, through treaties and agreements with local rulers.

By the reign of King Prasat Thong in mid-seventeenth century, there were many Southern Siamese ports that exported tin including Nakhon Si Thammarat (Ligor), Chumphon, Chaiya, Phunphin, Thalang and Bangkhli, on both coasts of Southern Siam, of which Thalang and Bangkhli were on the Andaman Coast (Bangkhli is in modern Thai Mueang district, Phangnga Province). Dutch East India Company (VOC) sought to make treaties with local Asian governments, either through diplomacy or forced naval blockade, to obtain tin export monopolies to their benefits. Dutch sources described governors of Thalang and Bangkhli as "viceroys" who held autonomous powers, capable of conducting independent diplomatic ventures with the Dutch. The Dutch established VOC factory at Nakhon Si Thammarat or Ligor in 1642, primarily for acquiring tin for export and had earlier concluded a treaty with Kedah in 1642. The Dutch concluded separate treaties with the governor of Thalang in March 1643 and the governor of Bangkhli in January 1645, in which local tin miners were forced to sell tin only to the Dutch, who suppressed the price low, not to South Indian merchants, in exchange for Indian textiles brought in by the Dutch. Any tin miners who were caught selling tin to other parties were to be punished by seizure of their tin goods. Furthermore, any Dutch traders committing criminal offenses in Thalang and Bangkhli would not be subjected to native Siamese legal system but the opperhoofd from Ayutthaya would come to judge instead, a partial form of extraterritoriality.

Ayutthaya struggles to control technically autonomous towns like Thalang and Bangkhli, which were under nominal authority of Nakhon Si Thammarat or Ligor, the Mueang Ek or first-level principal city of Southern Siam. The governor of Thalang even independently sent letters to Jeremias van Vliet the Governor of Dutch Malacca in 1644–1645. In 1645, King Prasat Thong appointed a new governor of Ligor and, through him, summoned the Thalang governor to Ayutthaya for the fourth time without success. The Ligor governor sought to control Thalang. In 1654, the Ligor governor divided Thalang island into two administrative parts, upsetting Okphra Phetkhiri the governor of Thalang. Okphra Phetkhiri, through Tenasserim, complained his case to Ayutthaya. The result was that the Ligor governor was replaced by the governor of Tenasserim as the new governor of Ligor.

Tin export monopoly is the Dutch way of conducting businesses in the area, using local governments and law enforcement to ensure their benefits. South Indian and Acehnese merchants were legally barred from buying tin in these ports. Dutch tin export monopoly generated resentment among local population, who were eager to sell tin to South Indian merchants who offered higher prices. The Dutch soon found out that local authorities barely honored the treaties, as their competitors South Indian and Acehnese merchants continued to buy tin in these ports.

=== Incident of 1658 ===
Local fury burst out in December 1658, when the Dutch insisted on searching Malay ships suspecting of smuggling tin, the local Malays killed Dutch officials and burnt down VOC factory in Phuket, causing the damage of over 22,000 guilders. This incident should be interpreted as a part of wider Malay resistance against Dutch commercial dominance in the region, in which Dutch officials in Perak were massacred in 1651 and Kedah in 1652 and 1658. King Narai of Ayutthaya responded to this incident by sending two royal commissioners, along with another Southern Siamese official from Ligor, to conduct investigation at Ligor and Phuket in 1659. The Dutch suspected that Okphra Phetkhiri the governor of Thalang was behind this incident. Phetkhiri was summoned to Ligor to provide his testimony. Siamese commissioners returned to Ayutthaya in 1661, bringing with them governor Okphra Phetkhiri and three Malay men suspected of killing Dutch officials. Phetkhiri was found no guilty and the three Malay men were sent to Malacca for punishments appropriated by the Dutch. Nevertheless, this incident led to closing down of Dutch factory of Phuket in 1660, leading to a ten-year hiatus of Dutch presence in Phuket.

=== Account of Jacques de Bourges (1662) ===
In 1658, Pierre Lambert de la Motte of the Paris Foreign Mission was made the first Apostolic Vicar of Cochin as titular titular bishop of Beirut. Lambert de la Motte left Marseilles with the secular priest Jacques de Bourges in 1660, arriving in Mergui in April 1662 and reaching Ayutthaya in August 1662. From Ayutthaya, Jacques de Bourges brought the letter of Lambert de la Motte back to Rome, passing through Paris. At Paris, De Bourges wrote the first French account on Siam, mentioning "Jansalom" or Junk Ceylon as one of eleven provinces of Siam; "The kingdom is divided into eleven provinces, to wit Siam, Martaban, Tenasserim, Junk Ceylon, Kedah, Perak, Johore, Pahang, Pattani, Ligor and Chaiya. These provinces formerly ranked as kingdoms but today are under domination of the King of Siam", mostly covering Southern Siam, representing wide-reaching Siamese claims over the Malay peninsula.

Jacques de Bourges returned to Ayutthaya in 1669. In 1671, Lambert de la Motte the bishop of Beirut and Vicar Apostolic of Cochin, staying in Ayutthaya, sent a Portuguese priest named Perez was sent from Ayutthaya to Phuket to proselytize. Perez noted that there had already been a large number of Portuguese Catholics in Phuket.

=== Dutch–Siamese Treaty of 1664 ===
King Prasat Thong of Ayutthaya had been in favor of the Dutch. In the reign of his son King Narai, however, Dutch–Siamese relations deteriorated. In the seventeenth century, Ayutthayan government had been sending royal ships to bring Siamese products such as deerskin and sappanwood to trade at Nagasaki, port of Tokugawa Japan, as a major source of revenue. Due to the Sakoku policy, Siam was unable to trade directly with Japan but rather through Dutch or Chinese middlemen. Dutch VOC had been exploiting this condition by asking for deerskin and tin export monopoly from Siam, guaranteeing them as the only channel for Siamese goods to be exported. However, King Narai commissioned his own trade junks under Chinese agents to sell Siamese products at Nagasaki, bypassing Dutch grip on Siamese export. By 1661, Chinese junks from Ayutthaya carried goods belonging to the king, members of royal family and high-ranking ministers to Nagasaki.

The Dutch found Siamese circumvention of their export monopoly increasingly frustrating, which they considered an unfair trade competition. In 1661, the Dutch seized a Portuguese ship belonging to King Narai in Macao. Narai responded by decreeing next year in 1662 that all export commodities should be sold to Royal Warehouse before going out, thus abolishing any Dutch privileges. The Dutch seized another trade ship belonging to King Narai at Banda Islands in 1663. Siamese troops attacked Dutch settlement at Ayutthaya in response, prompting the Dutch to closed down the VOC factory of Ayutthaya and retreat in 1663. Joan Maetsuycker the Governor-General of the Dutch East Indies at Batavia responded by sending three Dutch warships to impose naval blockade upon Ayutthaya. The blockade lasted for four months from October 1663 to February 1664.

Siamese court eventually took a reconciliatory stance as the Dutch–Siamese Treaty was signed on 11 August 1664, normalizing Dutch–Siamese relations. In the treaty, Ayutthaya granted deerskin export monopoly to the Dutch. Peaceful, undisturbed trade and no higher duties was to be guaranteed in "Ligor, Oetjangh Salangh and other places". Even though Dutch–Siamese relations was normalized, the incident took a huge impact on King Narai's sentiments towards the Dutch, prompting the king to soon seek out for other European nations to counter Dutch influence. The Dutch were yet to re-obtain tin monopoly in Phuket after 1658. Even though the Dutch continued to acquire tin from Phuket, they did with difficulty and the yield was minimal.

=== Dutch Blockade of Phuket: 1673–1675 ===
Balthasar Bort, the Governor-General of Dutch East Indies, told Nicolaas de Rooij the Dutch opperhoofd of Ayutthaya to attempt to re-obtain license for tin monopoly from King Narai. Nicolaas de Rooij managed to obtain licenses from King Narai in 1670 granting tin export monopoly to the Dutch in Ligor, Thalang and Bangkhli. Success of the Dutch was short-lived as the Dutch ship Dolphin was seized at Bangkhli by local inhabitants in April 1671, massacring the Dutch, for the local tin miners were angry that South Indian merchants were offering much higher prices for tin in Tenasserim, they refused to be under Dutch commercial dominance again. With Ayutthayan government taking minimal responses to this incident, the Dutch decided to take matters into their own hands. In 1673, Dutch sloops attacked and set fires on settlements on Phuket and Bangkhli, imposing naval blockade onto the island, accusing the Siamese governor of Bangkhli of being "seeming to love with the mouth but the Kedahans with the heart". Taking their base on the Banquala bay (modern Patong Bay), the Dutch, with three sloops, patrolled the surrounding waters, searching and preventing any attempts to smuggle tin out of the island.

For two years, the Dutch imposed naval blockade onto Phuket. In 1675, the Dutch sloop seized an Acehnese merchant ship, funded by an English trader, with full load of tin. This incident angered the local Malays, who had enough of the Dutch. The local Malays protested that the Dutch action was against the protection of the "Radja of Jansalone" (Okphra Phetkhiri, the governor of Thalang) but the Dutch replied that all the roads and rivers of Jansalone belonged to them. The Dutch fired into the gathering crowd, killing some and dispersing the rest. The local Malays took revenge by cutting down tree logs to block the exit passageway, trapping the Dutch inside of the waterway. The local Malays then descended upon the Dutch, killing every Dutch men, tearing Dutch sloop into pieces.

The Dutch VOC protested this incident to Ayutthaya. Upon learning about this incident, King Narai decided to go against the Dutch. King Narai ordered Okphra Phetkhiri the governor of Thalang to supply each of the three ports of Phuket with two large war prows, to arm and fortify the island against possible Dutch attacks. Another attack on Dutch ship in Phuket occurred in 1677. The Dutch considered conquering Phuket but realized that the cost of conducting warfare would not be met by minimal tin product yield from the island.

=== Visit of Thomas Bowrey (1675) ===
In the seventeenth century, Siam had claims over Andaman coastal port towns like Phuket, Trang and Bangkhli. By the 1670s, Phuket had about 6,000 inhabitants, with the Malay-majority population as miners under Siamese government or foreign investors. Thomas Bowrey, an English free merchant in India under employment of William Jearsey of the Fort of St. George, visited many places in the region including Phuket, Kedah and Aceh, providing valuable accounts of these places. Thomas Bowrey visited Phuket, which he called "Jansalone", around 1675. Bowrey states that the Phuket islands belonged to the King of Siam (It wholy belongeth to the Kinge of Syam,). The Siamese lived in the inner parts of the island (The Inhabitants Up in the Countrey are Naturall Syamers,), while the Malays lived in the seaports (downe att the Sea Ports most of the Inhabitants are Malayars). Bowrey also noted the presence of the pirate "Saletter" Orang Laut sea nomads cruising around the area. Three ports, Buckett (Phuket), Luppoone (Liphon) and Banquala were on the island. Phuket island was mostly uncultivated wilderness, with a plenty of wild animals including elephants, tigers and ferocious monkeys with large teeth, less than ten percent of the lands were put to use, according to Bowrey's estimation. Phuket had abundance of fruits including plantains, coconuts, pomelos and areca nuts. Rice was grown in the inner middle part of the island but was barely sustainable to the inhabitants.

The island only produced elephant and tin for export (The Whole Island affordeth nothinge Save Some Elephants and tinne.) and the inhabitants trade in small tin lumps called Putta. Bowrey called the raja or governor of Thalang a viceroy (Vice Kinge), given his local autonomous power. The governor of Thalang resided in Luppoone, which was the chief settlement in the inner part of the island. Traders arrived at the seaport of Banquala on the southwestern side of the island, where the custom toll stood and the trading ships would proceed up the river to the inland. The governor Okphra Phetkhiri at Luppoone sent elephants to fetch Bowrey up to meet him. Bowrey discovered that, without exemption license from the Siamese king, he had to pay ten percent custom of all goods he carried.

=== Mohammed Beg and Ismael Beg ===
As the Dutch had been imposing blockade on Phuket, King Narai was informed about prospective Dutch invasion and conquest of Phuket. King Narai then removed Okphra Phetkhiri the anti-Dutch governor of Phuket from his position in mid-1676, under suggestion of Okphra Si Naowarat Aqa Muhammad Astarabadi, a Shiite Persian influential figure in Siamese royal court of King Narai and installed Muslim Indian Chulia brothers, Mohammed Beg and Ismael Beg, as governors of Thalang and Bangkhli, respectively. According to Bowrey, King Narai wanted austere men who would be fitter to govern the island. These two governors soon alienated local officials and populace by installing a hundred of their own fellow Muslim Indian traders to positions of influence and taking control of the tin export there. Thomas Bowrey, visiting Phuket again in 1677, was well-entertained by Mohammed Beg the governor of Phuket. However, Bowrey also noticed that the local Siamese and Malay people were dissatisfied with forced labor and tyranny under the new governor. The previously existing local Siamese elite were upset that their positions and power were replaced by the Chulias. Furthermore, Mohammed Beg and Ismael Beg attempted to divert all tin export to Mergui, where South Indian merchants had been frequenting, shipping tin to Indian and Persian destinations.

Mohammed Beg and Ismael Beg did not establish a long-lasting control over the area. Shortly after the political downfall and execution of Okphra Si Naowarat Aqa Muhammad lineage Turk in 1678, Siamese and Malay people of Phuket jointly rose up to murder the two brothers Mohammed Beg and Ismael Beg, along with other seventy Moorish and Chulia men in Phuket in 1679. This incident put Phuket into the state of anarchy as Thomas Bowrey himself had to flee to Kedah for a time being.

=== Kedah–Siam conflicts ===
In 1619, Kedah was attacked and conquered by Aceh sultanate, with the Kedah sultan carried off as prisoner to Aceh. Kedah then sought protection under Ayutthaya. By the mid-seventeenth century, the Malay sultanates of Kedah, Singgora and Pattani had been sending bunga mas tributes to Ayutthaya as tributary states. King Prasat Thong repeatedly demanded personal presence of the Kedah sultan in Ayutthaya, which Sultan Rijaluddin Muhammad Shah avoided by feigning illness in 1645. King Prasat Thong responded by sending his own portrait engraved on a golden to the Kedah sultan with instructions on how to worship the image of the Siamese king. In 1646, all of the three Malay states of Kedah, Singgora and Pattani collectively ceased sending tributes to Ayutthaya in defiance, with Singgora attacking Phatthalung and Trang, initiating the Malay–Siamese War of 1646–1650. King Prasat Thong of Ayutthaya sent Siamese armies of 15,000 men from Ayutthaya and 7,000 men from Ligor to subjugate the Malay rebellious polities in the south but failed. Ayutthaya asked the Dutch to attack Kedah. The Dutch attacked Kedah in 1648, prompting Sultan Rijaluddin Muhammad Shah of Kedah to send bunga mas tribute to Ayutthaya in 1648 but the Dutch continued to impose naval blockade on Kedah during 1648–1652. In 1649, Singgora and Pattani retaliated, attacking up north and capturing the Nakhon Si Thammarat or Ligor city itself, the center of Ayutthayan administrative power in the south. King Prasat Thong sent 25,000 Siamese men with 20 Dutch ships to counter the Malay attacks. By 1650, Singgora agreed to peace and resumed sending bunga mas tributes to Ayutthaya.

With ascension of Dziaddin Mukarram Shah I in 1662, the new Kedah sultan sent two envoys to Ayutthaya to present the bunga mas tribute to King Narai in 1662, also to ask for Siamese assistance against another Dutch blockade of Kedah but Siam did not provide any assistances. Kedah did not send more tributes to Ayutthaya in the next eight years. When Ayutthaya asked for tributes again, Kedah did not send, prompting King Narai to send Siamese fleets to attack Kedah in 1670 and 1673–1674 but were not successful. Kedah withstood the Siamese attack of twenty ships in 1674. The Dutch intervened on Siamese side, imposing naval blockade on Kedah in 1674. In 1677, King Narai sent a golden cap and a goodwill letter to Sultan Dziaddin Mukarram Shah in effort to win over Kedah through peace but, nevertheless, Kedah, Singgora and Pattani jointly ceased sending tributes to Siam altogether in the same year, with Kedahan forces attacking Thalang and Bangkhli, leading to the Malay–Siamese War of 1678–1680. King Narai sent Siamese armies to the Malay south in 1678 to subjugate the rebellious Malay polities. Siamese conquest and destruction of Singgora in 1680 put the end to much of Malay resistance against Siamese power in Southern Siam.

When Sultan Dziaddin Mukarram Shah refused to send tributes to Ayutthaya again in 1681 upon Siamese request, King Narai ordered the governor of Thalang or Phuket to bring naval forces to attack Kedah.

== French activities in Phuket ==
=== Arrival of the French ===
For four decades, since the 1640s, the Dutch had been dominating tin export and commercial activities on the Andaman Coast and the Malay archipegalo. Siamese court had been relying on mutual trade benefits with the Dutch, who also assisted Siam in subjugating rebellious Malay tributary states of the south. However, Siam found the business practices of the Dutch – Dutch efforts to monopolize export of Siamese goods to themselves, acting as enforcing middlemen – increasingly demanding. Siamese king and Siamese court sought to circumvent Dutch commercial dominance in order to seek for more potential benefits. Dutch blockade of Ayutthaya in 1663–1664 left negative impression on King Narai and the Siamese court. Even though the Dutch–Siamese Treaty of 1664 restored Dutch–Siamese relations to friendly terms, goodwill was only on the surface. When other European nations stepped in, Siam was more than eager to embrace the newcomers to counter Dutch influence.

Franco–Siamese relations began with arrival of French missionaries of Paris Foreign Missions Society in Ayutthaya during the 1660s. In 1680, French East India Company sent a diplomatic ship led by André Deslandes-Boureau, who was the future son-in-law of the Governor-General of French Pondicherry François Martin, on the ship Vautour to Ayutthaya, becoming the first official diplomatic contact between Ayutthaya and France. In the same year, in 1680, a French trading ship acquired a full load of tin from Phuket. In 1682, King Narai appointed a French medical missionary René Charbonneau of the Mission of St. Lazarus as the governor of Thalang with title Okphra Thalang. Charbonneau was a medical missionary, arriving in Siam in 1677, having been serving as a physician under the Siamese king Narai. Charboneau was reluctant to take Phuket governor position but was possibly under requirement of King Narai himself and Louis Laneau the Vicar Apostolic of Siam to take a political mission to reduce Dutch influence and expand French influence over Phuket. Free trade was allowed in Phuket as all incoming vessels were welcomed, disregarding Dutch influence and the previous Dutch tin export monopoly in Phuket.

=== Account of Nicolas Gervaise ===
Nicolas Gervaise, a French missionary from the Paris Foreign Mission, arrived in Ayutthaya in 1683, spending four years in Ayutthaya from 1683 to 1686. In 1688, Gervaise published The Natural and Political History of the Kingdom of Siam, which mentioned "Jonsalam" as situating on to the west of Malay Peninsula at about 8 degrees latitude. Gervaise commented that the seaport of Phuket had a large roadstead, serving as a toll to collect duties accommodating trading vessels but the seaport was not deep enough for large vessels to anchor. Phuket was crucial as a refuge for trading vessels travelling from Coromandel Coast to Malay archipelago seeking shelter from storms in July and August. Gervaise also said that Junkceylon (Phuket) was of great importance in trade with Bengal, Pegu and other kingdoms. Gervaise related that the Dutch had been setting eyes on Junkceylon because the island had an abundance of tin, also some gold and ambergris but the French governor of Phuket René Charbonneau, appointed by the Siamese king Narai, would not allow the Dutch to enter Phuket.

=== Franco–Siamese Treaties of 1685 and 1687 ===
King Narai sent the first Siamese embassy to France in 1681, boarding on Soleil d'Orient but the ship wrecked off the coast of Madagascar at the end of the year. King Narai tried again by sending another Siamese mission in 1684, which successfully reached Paris, having an audience with King Louis XIV of France. King Louis XIV reciprocated by sending French diplomatic mission led by Chevalier de Chaumont, accompanied by Abbé de Choisy, to Ayutthaya in 1685, leading to conclusion of the Franco–Siamese Treaty of 1685, which granted tin export monopoly in Phuket to France. René Charbonneau the governor of Thalang, who had been desiring to return to Ayutthaya, was recalled in 1685 as King Narai appointed Sieur de Billy, the former maître d'hôtel of De Chaumont, as the new governor of Thalang-Phuket and Jean Rival, a Provençal French man, as governor of Takua Pa and Bangkhli. Abbé de Choisy mentioned "Joncelang" as a Siamese seaport on the west coast of Malay peninsula, being abundant in tin and ambergris, while Chevalier de Chaumont mentioned "Josalam" of Junkceylon as one of eleven provinces of Siam, in similar manner to the 1662 account of Jacques de Bourges but the list of eleven provinces was different. De Chaumont observed that the tin from Junkceylon was shipped in King Narai's royal junks to China, Coromandel Coast and Surat.

After the Franco–Siamese Treaty of 1685, King Narai sent a Siamese diplomatic mission under Kosa Pan to Paris in 1686 to ratify the treaty. King Louis XIV reciprocated by sending another French diplomatic mission under Simon de la Loubère and Claude Céberet du Boullay in 1687, with General Desfarges commanding French military forces accompanying the mission, leading to conclusion of the Franco–Siamese Treaty of 1687, which confirmed French tin export monopoly from Phuket, also allowing the French to station their military troops in Bangkok and Mergui under the commands of General Desfarges.

Simon de la Loubère returned to France with the last Siamese mission to France as King Narai assigned the French Jesuit priest Guy Tachard as his representative, along with three Siamese mandarins, to go to Europe in January 1688. Three years later, in 1691, La Loubère published Du royaume de Siam, which provided a detailed description of "Jonsalam". La Loubère related that Junkceylon was abundant in tin and, due to remoteness, the King of Siam allow local Junkceylon inhabitants to privately mine the tin in their own businesses, in accordance with their "ancient rights", paying amounts of tax to the king in return, unlike most of Siam, where the tin belonged solely to the Siamese king and could only be sold under the name of the king, a royal monopoly. Junkceylon or Phuket was the place where common people could pursue tin mining industry for their own benefits.

=== French expedition to Phuket (1689) ===
The Franco–Siamese Treaty of 1687 allowed the French to station their troops at strategic cities of Bangkok and Mergui. When King Narai was on his deathbed in June 1688, seeing the French as threats, the anti-French faction led by Okphra Phetracha staged a coup (Siamese Revolution of 1688), overthrowing King Narai's regime and his dynasty altogether. Okphra Phetracha made himself the new king of Siam, establishing the Ban Phlu Luang dynasty that would rule Siam until the Fall of Ayutthaya in 1767. General Desfarges the French supreme military commander in Siam, stationing at Bangkok, failed to respond in time to this seizure of power. Phetracha sent Siamese forces to lay siege on the French-held Bangkok fort as French personnel and missionaries, including Sieur de Billy the governor of Thalang and Jean Rival the governor of Takuapa, were kept as prisoners, their eventual fates unknown. René Charbonneau the former governor of Junkceylon, however, was treated with respect as Charbonneau had earlier resigned from the French mission, acting as an independent, non-aligned French man. Phetracha even asked the Dutch to shelter Charbonneau for fear that some Siamese men might unintentionally hurt Charbonneau.

After five-month-long siege, Phetracha reached an agreement with Desfarges in November 1688, allowing Desfarges to peacefully evacuate his French troops out of from Siam. The French and the Siamese exchanged hostages to enforce agreement terms. Leaving Siam with three Siamese noblemen hostages in November 1688, Desfarges and his French crew crossed the Bay of Bengal and reached Pondicherry in January 1689. A council of civil and military authorities was held at Pondicherry, which was then under François Martin the Governor-General of French Pondicherry. The French decided to seize Phuket as the leverage against the new regime of Phetracha. Desfarges led his remaining French forces of 330 men to sail from Pondicherry, again crossing the Bay of Bengal, arriving in Phuket in April 1689. Desfarges anchored at the harbor, still holding three Siamese hostages, sending a letter to Kosa Pan the Phrakhlang or the Siamese Minister of Trade and Foreign Affairs, laying out his conditions, calling for repatriation of remaining French captives in Siam and return of French properties. This conditions fell on deaf ears of the new Siamese king Phetracha, who ignored Desfarges' pleas and instead ordered Siamese authorities in Phuket not to provide any provisions or water to Desfarges, pressuring the French to leave Phuket.

Desfarges and the French did not occupy the whole Phuket island but rather stayed at the harbor, waiting for responses from Ayutthaya. In August 1689, Desfarges sent one of the Siamese hostages to bring his letter to Kosa Pan the Phrakhlang, calling for the new King Phetracha of Ayutthaya to send Siamese envoys to Junkceylon to negotiate and conclude a new treaty. Véret the head of former French factory in Ayutthaya also entrusted his letter to the hostage to Ayutthaya, calling for Siam to cede Junkceylon island to French East India Company. Phetracha apparently did not care about any of these French demands, saying that French Christian hostages would be released only when Desfarges release the two remaining Siamese noblemen hostages. After seven months of unfruitful expedition to Phuket, Desfarges decided to abandon his plan to procure agreements from the new Siamese regime, leaving Junkceylon or Phuket in November 1689 empty-handed, along with the French crew, releasing the remaining Siamese hostages.

== Early 18th century ==
=== Reign of Phetracha ===
After the expulsion of the French from Siam in 1688, the Siamese Ayutthaya Kingdom under the new Ban Phlu Luang dynasty found itself in relative isolation from the Western world in contrast to the rising Siamese tributary trade with Qing China in the Chinese Century. Westerners became less interested in Phuket. With lessening contact with the West, Siam found fewer opportunities to put Phuket island on the bargaining table. With reduced visit of Westerners, records about Phuket in the early eighteenth century fell relatively silent. The rising Chinese traders in Siam were active on the Siamese ports on the Gulf of Siam coast including Nakhon Si Thammarat (Ligor), Songkhla and Pattani but not on the Andaman Coast.

After expulsion of the French from Siam in 1688, the anti-French new king Phetracha confirmed treaty terms with the Dutch East India Company in November 1688, confirming Dutch monopoly over tin export from Ligor but not mentioning Phuket. Phetracha seemed to initially favor the Dutch but the Dutch soon fell out of his favor. Phetracha did not fervently engage in diplomatic relations with the Dutch like his predecessors of the previous dynasty had done. The blatantly-attempted French diplomatic mission under Guy Tachard to Ayutthaya in 1699 also did not win any concessions from Siam. Siam simply became disinterested in diplomatic and commercial relations with Westerners. Meanwhile, Chinese traders were gaining influence in Siamese court. With tragic death of Kosa Pan the Phrakhlang Minister of Trade at the hands of King Phetracha in 1699, a Chinese man was appointed to the position of Phrakhlang for the first time in 1700 to replace Kosa Pan.

Previously, Ayutthayan government had been relying on Nakhon Si Thammarat or Ligor the Mueang Ek or First-level city, chief city of Southern Siam, to control this Southern Siamese region, including Phuket. In his reign, King Phetracha of Ayutthaya grappled with internal rebellions and dissidents, who questioned his legitimacy in usurpation of the Ayutthayan throne in 1688. In 1700, Phraya Ramdecho the governor of Ligor, appointed by King Narai, had not submitted to Phetracha and rebelled. Phetracha had to send a force of 15,000 men from Ayutthaya to successfully subjugate this Ligor rebellion with great effort. King Phetracha died in 1703, succeeded by his son Phra Chao Suea. Another governor of Ligor, appointed by Phetracha, did not accept Phra Chao Suea as his new king and rebelled in 1704 but was suppressed a year later in 1705. After his short reign, King Phra Chao Suea died in 1709, succeeded by his son King Thaisa.

With frequent regional rebellions, the Ban Phlu Luang dynasty was unwilling to allow the provincial governors to retain unnecessary powers. The Ligor governorship was, therefore, stripped of much of its powers in Southern Siam to "clip its wings" as its satellite cities including Phatthalung and Songkhla reported directly to Ayutthaya. The whole southern region was put under supervision of the Samuha Kalahom or Prime Minister of the South of the Kalahom department, extending central government powers to the periphery.

=== Rising Chinese commercial dominance ===
In the reign of King Thaisa, Chinese merchants and traders gained influence in Siamese government and economy as Chaophraya Phrakhlang Chin, the Phrakhlang Minister of Trade of Chinese ethnicity, took power in Siamese court. The Chinese overtook the Dutch as the main investors for the tin mining industry in Southern Siam. In the early eighteenth century, the Chinese began to settle in Phuket as tin miners. In 1716, a Chinese entrepreneur, assigned with a Siamese noble title, was supervising tin mining near Songkhla. The main Chinese tin mining entrepôt, however, was not in Siam but rather at Bangka Island offshore Sumatra.

In 1718, Alexander Hamilton the commander of Bombay Marine, on his journey to Ayutthaya, visited "Jonceyloan" or Junkceylon or Phuket. Hamilton narrated that Junkceylon was a part of the Siamese kingdom (it lies in the dominions of the king of Siam). Hamilton mentioned two different ports on Phuket, each for a different monsoon season. A port situating between Phuket island and the mainland was suitable during the season of southwestern monsoon, whereas the "Puton Bay" (Patong Bay) was the safe harbor for the northeastern monsoon season. Hamilton related that Junkceylon was abundant in tin but there were few people to dig it, possibly due to depopulation. Most importantly, Hamilton mentioned that the governor of Junkceylon and the elites were mostly Chinese (and the governors being generally Chinese), who bought their position from the Siamese government and, in turn, oppressed local people for their benefits.

In spite of the decline of tin trade in Phuket in the early eighteenth century, the economy was still thriving to some extent. Phuket was mentioned as one of the principal Asian ports in the Bay of Bengal trading with the British Fort St. George or Madras of the Coromandel Coast. They were Pegu, Mergui, Kedah and Ujong Salang (Phuket). Hamilton said that the local Phuket inhabitants engaged in low-scale trade with the Coromandel Coast and Bengal. Trans-Bay-of-Bengal trade of the mid-seventeenth century between Phuket and Coromandel Coast seemed to survive into the early eighteenth century, albeit in a reduced state. Phuket was, unfortunately, not a part of the growing Sino-Siamese tributary trade and, therefore, suffered decline in the early eighteenth century.

=== Northumberland Incident (1756) ===
Northumberland, a British sloop carrying tin from Kedah and Selangor to return to Madras, anchored at Phuket in April 1756. Its captain, John Mackmath, went ashore to visit the Siamese governor of Junkceylon or Phuket. During this visit, eight Malay men from Phuket and Langkawi, led by a certain Capitan China, a Chinese person, attacked and plundered the Northumberland ship for its tin cargo. The eight Malay men were able to kill six British crew and the remaining twenty-one British men were captured. The Capitan China, who was the ringleader of this robbery and the principal servant of the Siamese governor of Phuket according to Mackmath, personally stabbed the British chief mate of Northumberland to death. Fearing for his life, Mackmath had to hide on the Phuket island for ten days before he was able to get on another British sloop to leave Phuket.

Two months after the incident, around June or July 1756, Raja Pookolo the Kedahan governor of Langkawi arrived in Phuket to bring the Northumberland ship, along with the eight Malay men, who had earlier attacked the ship and the surviving twenty-one British crew of Northumberland to Langkawi. The Northumberland ship ended up being sunk at Kuala Kedah and its cargo being given to the Sultan of Kedah. In August 1756, William Ormston, another British merchant, arrived in Phuket to ask the governor of Phuket to pay the debt. The Phuket governor told Ormston that the earlier incident of plunder Northumberland was perpetrated by the Malays outside of his jurisdiction.

Seeking revenge for his lost crew members and his lost cargo, John Macmath pressured George Pigot the British president of Madras to retaliate against Siam. Pigot called this incident the "Malay Treachery in Junk Ceylon". In early 1757, the Madras presidency sent letters to the Siamese royal court of Ayutthaya, urging the Siamese government to restitute to Mackmath or else the British would seize Siamese ships in the Andaman Sea. Pigot, however, soon realized that the Siamese central government was oblivious to the events in Junkceylon. The Siamese court was apparently not informed about the incidents happening in the faraway Phuket at the frontiers. King Borommakot of Ayutthaya reportedly took action by sending guards to arrest the ringleader of this robbery (presumably the Capitan China the principal servant of the Phuket governor) to Ayutthaya but the ringleader stabbed himself to death in the act of suicide before reaching Ayutthaya.

In 1758, the British learned that the Capitan China had owed debts to the Sultan of Kedah and this Chinese headman robbed British cargo ship in order to repay his debts to the Kedah Sultan. In 1759, the Madras presidency warned British ships not to visit any Siamese or Kedahan ports. The British also learned that the Northumberland ship and its cargo might somehow ended up in Kedah. John Mackmath asked Kedah to return his ship and his cargo. Sultan Muhammad Jiwa Zainal Adilin of Kedah replied that Junkceylon was not under his jurisdiction, being under Siamese jurisdiction but if the ship had ventured out elsewhere he would try his best to search for it. This reply caused Mackmath to believe that the Kedah Sultan, in some way, was involved in this incident and urged Madras authorities to take strong actions. George Pigot the president of Madras ordered the seizure of Kedahan merchant ship in Madras in July 1759. The Sultan of Kedah made a public declaration in 1760 that he had taken no parts in this Northumberland incident and criticized Mackmath for not being able to protect his cargo ship and his crew against just eight Malay men.

This robbery of Northumberland ship belonging to John Mackmath at Phuket in 1756 seemed to be a conspiracy among local Siamese and Kedahan Malays to seize British goods. Pierre Brigot the French Vicar Apostolic of Siam at Ayutthaya wrote in 1762 that local Siamese officials in Phuket, being far from the government of Ayutthaya, not under knowledge of the Siamese king, resorted themselves to piracy, preying on the commuting British cargo ships.

== Rule of the Clan of Lady Chan ==
=== Origin of Lady Chan's family ===
According to a native Thai writing dated to 1841, in around mid-eighteenth century, during the last decades of Ayutthaya Kingdom, there were two chiefs on the Phuket island:

- Chom Rang, who resided at Ban Takhian. He was the official governor of Thalang or Chalang.
- Chom Thao, who resided at Ban Don.

"Chom" is a Southern Thai honorific for a respectable man. Chom Rang and Chom Thao were said to be half-brothers, born from the same father but different mothers. Ban Takhian and Ban Don were two separate settlements on the Phuket Island.

Chom Rang married a Kedahan Malay woman immigrating from Kedah named Masia (Masia had been a Kedahan Malay woman who had been married to a man but lost her inheritance dispute over her deceased husband's property so she moved to Phuket and married Chom Rang as her second husband) and, with her, Chom Rang had two sons and three daughters, including his daughters Chan and Mook. Lady Chan was said to be born around 1735. Upon growing up, Chan married Muen Si Phakdi, a Southern Thai nobleman from Takuathung. Muen Si Phakdi was a son of Chom Naikong, a Southern Thai official from Nakhon Si Thammarat or Ligor. With Muen Si Phakdi, Chan had a daughter named Prang and a son named Thian. Muen Si Phakdi, first husband of Lady Chan, soon died in an unspecified year. Chan remarried. She married Phra Phimon the governor of Kraburi.

After the deaths of Chom Rang and Chom Thao, Aat, a son of Chom Rang and a brother of Chan and Mook, became the new governor of Phuket. However, Aat was soon assassinated, shot dead. Phuket then entered the state of upheaval. Phra Phimon, second husband of Chan, was transferred to become the governor of Phatthalung around 1766 but Chan remained in Phuket.

=== Thonburi Period ===
Phraya Ratchasuphawadi the governor of Ligor was called to bring Southern Siamese forces to fend off the invading Burmese forces at Ratchaburi, leaving Phra Palat Nu the deputy governor in charge in Ligor. However, the Ligor governor did not return and Ayutthaya fell to the Burmese in April 1767. Phra Palat Nu, in absence of a controlling central authority, declared himself the leader of the new Southern Siamese independent regime, one of many regional regimes breaking away after the catastrophic Fall of Ayutthaya. Phra Palat Nu became Chao Nakhon or the Lord of Ligor. His regime extended over Nakhon Si Thammarat (Ligor), Phatthalung and Songkhla. Phra Phimon, Chan's husband, was then the governor of Phatthalung. Two years later, in August 1769, the new King Taksin of Thonburi brought Central Siamese forces to the south to subjugate the Southern Siamese regime of Nakhon Nu. Uparaj Chan, deputy of Nakhon Nu, led the Ligorians to fight the Central Siamese but was defeated. Governors of Ligor, Phatthalung and Songkhla fled to take refuge in Pattani under Sultan Mohammad. Chaophraya Chakri Mud, commander under Taksin, secured the surrender and release of the three fugitive governors from Pattani to Taksin. Phra Phimon the governor of Phatthalung, husband of Lady Chan, was later made the governor of Thalang by King Taksin. Thongphun, son of Chom Thao and half-cousin of Lady Chan, was made deputy governor of Thalang on the same occasion.

It was in the tenure of Phra Phimon as the governor of Thalang that Francis Light, a "country trader", first arrived in Phuket in 1771. Francis Light arrived to settle in Phuket in 1772 and soon became a friend to Lady Chan's family. Francis Light soon met a local Portuguese–Malay–Siamese Catholic Mestizo woman named Martinha Rosells and had his first child with her in 1779, despite not marrying her. Francis Light settled down at Tharuea, the main town of the island. In 1776, Francis Light gifted 1,400 flintlock muskets to King Taksin of Siam, earning him a Siamese noble title Phraya Ratcha Kapitan. Despite being held captive at Thonburi for six years, Nakhon Nu the former Lord of Ligor was restored as the "King of Ligor" and overlord of Southern Siam under King Taksin in 1776. After 1776, King Taksin sent Chaophraya Inthawongsa to be the superintendent of Siamese tin-producing Andaman coastal region of the Malay peninsula including Phuket in order to procure tin for the Royal Warehouse to trade. Inthawongsa headquartered at Pak Phra in modern Takua Thung district, opposite of Phuket on the mainland.

Johann Gerhard König, a Danish botanist, set sail from Tranquebar to visit Siam under the Thonburi Kingdom in late 1778. On his return journey to India, König spent some months in Phuket in 1779 observing plants and flora. König arrived at Tharuea or the port of Phuket on the eastern side of the island in March 1779 on the ship Bristol commanded by Captain Francis Light himself. During his stay in Phuket, König also visited nearby small islands and mentioned many places including Tarmah (Tharuea), Pullo Penjang or Pullo Salang (Koh Yao Yai), Pullo Salang Minor (Koh Yao Noi), Lem Nga (Laem Nga), Kopran (Koh Maphrao) and Pullo Jamu (Laem Yamu).

König stayed in Phuket for four months until his departure in July 1779 because of a sudden negative attitude of Siamese government towards the Westerners, which, according to König, was due to some quarrels between English captains and the Siamese authorities. In Francis Light's letter to Warren Hastings in 1780, Light recounted his conflict with Siamese government, in which a certain high ranking Siamese commissioner at Pak Phra called "Chao Phya" forbid the local Phuket people to pay tin to Light for the rice Light had brought in. The Chao Phya then sent forces to seize and plunder Francis Light's house in Thalang, forcing Francis Light to abandon his house. This "Chao Phya" was certainly Chaophraya Inthawongsa, who was appointed by King Taksin as the superintendent of the Andaman coast around 1776. The Chao Phya, who established a stockade at Pak Phra where every officials had to visit to receive orders, according to Light, was unpopular among the Phuket inhabitants.

In April 1782, King Taksin was removed from power and executed, ending the Thonburi regime. The new Bangkok-based Rattanakosin Kingdom was founded under the new king Rama I of the Chakri dynasty. The new Bangkok regime was yet to pacify Southern Siam as there were Thonburi loyalists; Nakhon Nu the King of Ligor and Chaophraya Inthawongsa the superintendent of the Andaman Coast, both of them appointed by Taksin. King Rama I repeatedly called for Nakhon Nu to report himself at Bangkok to demonstrate loyalty but Nakhon Nu refused to comply. Eventually, the Bangkok regime gained control over Southern Siam by sacking Nakhon Nu from his position in 1784, replacing Nakhon Nu with his own son-in-law Phat as the new governor of Ligor. Bangkok court then sent three commissioners, namely Chaophraya Lueratchanikun, Phraya Thammatrailok and Phraya Phiphitphokhai, to the Andaman Coast as commissioners in 1784, leading to a battle between Chaophraya Inthawongsa the old lord and the new commissioners. Inthawongsa was defeated, committing suicide as the three commissioners gained power over the Andaman Coast.

=== Visit of Thomas Forrest (1784) ===
In 1784, Warren Hastings of the Bengal Government sent Thomas Forrest a country trader as a British envoy to secure a trading agreement with Raja Haji Fisabilillah the Crown Prince of Johor. However, Raja Haji was killed in a battle at Malacca, prompting Forrest to abandon his diplomatic mission and went to Phuket instead. Thomas Forrest called Phuket "Jan Sylan", saying that the island was divided from the continental promontory, where the harbor of Popra (Pak Phra) stood, by a narrow isthmus. Forrest wrote that the Phuket inhabitants generally spoke the Malay language and that the name Jan Sylan was derived from Oojong Sylan but then stated that, due to external contacts, also spoke Siamese language. Phuket people looked like the Malays with Chinese features.

Forrest also mentioned Pulo Panjang or Koh Yao Yai. Forrest listed seventeen villages on Phuket, including Terowa (Tharuea), Bankian (Ban Takhian), Bandan (Ban Don), Popra (Pak Phra), Bandpon (Ban Liphon), etc., totalling 12,000 inhabitants. Forrest named the governor or viceroy of Phuket as Peepeemont (Phra Phimon), assisted by official Pee Tukerat (Phra Thukkharat, deputy governor). Forrest narrated the geography of Phuket as having a hilly interior with coastal flatlands and mangrove forests. The creek draining from the hilly interior to the sea was so shallow that only paddle boats can be used to reach Terowa or Tharuea in the interior, where the governor resided. Forrest noted that Phra Phimon the governor of Phuket did not speak Malay and had a Portuguese translator.

In the matter of trade, Forrest observed that British trading ships from Bengal brought opium to Phuket to trade for tin but the Siamese government had been banning opium import. By 1784, tin production in Phuket was taxed by the Siamese government. Duty collection rights on tin mining in Phuket had been farmed out to a Chinese agent, who acted as the tax collector. In order to procure tin, a tin miner had to pay 12 percent of the tin produced to this Chinese tax farmer official in order to be allowed to mine for tin. In order to export tin from Phuket, one had to pay 25 percent or a quarter of tin to the Siamese government. Forrest claimed that this tax policy aroused dissatisfactions among local Phuket inhabitants to the point that Peepeemont the Phuket governor considered rebelling against the central government at Bangkok. Again, small tin lumps called Poot were used as local currency (compare "Putta" observed by Thomas Bowrey in 1675). Forrest's observation of Junkceylon was later published as a part of his book A Voyage from Calcutta to the Mergui Archipelago, also an Account of the Islands Jan Sylan in 1792.

=== Burmese Invasion of 1785–1786 ===
As the new Bangkok regime consolidated its rule over Southern Siam, the old Thalang elite, family of Lady Chan, was in precarious position. Phra Phimon the governor of Thalang and even Francis Light came into conflict with Phraya Thammatrailok, one of the three commissioners over Andaman Coast stationed at Pak Phra, appointed by Bangkok. In the letter of Phraya Thukkharat Thian, son of Lady Chan, to Francis Light at Penang, dated to January 1788, Thukkharat apologized Francis Light on behalf of the Siamese government for an unspecified earlier swindle against Light caused by the royal commissioner Phraya Thammatrailok. No details was given about the incident. It was likely that the new commissioners at Pak Phra targeted the Thalang elite the family of Lady Chan and Francis Light himself had been a close ally of Phra Phimon, Lady Chan's husband. The commissioners at Pak Phra might perceive these Phuket elites as not submitting to the new Bangkok regime, their loyalty uncertain. Phra Phimon the Thalang governor had at least some designs for a rebellion against Bangkok. Francis Light eventually had to leave Phuket. Phra Phimon fell gravely ill and his wife Lady Chan was arrested by orders of Phraya Thammatrailok on an unspecified charge. She was taken to Pak Phra for investigation.

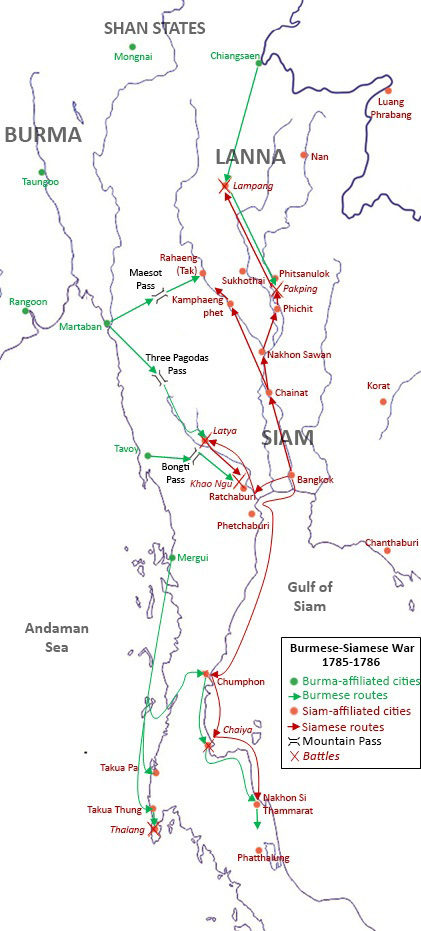
In late 1785, the Burmese armies invaded Siam in five directions, including attacks on Southern Siam and Andaman Coast, known as the Nine Armies War.

The rising militaristic Burmese Konbaung dynasty permanently took control of Tenasserim coastal cities of Tavoy and Mergui during its invasion of Siam in 1765. Possession of Tenasserim allowed the Burmese to utilize Tenasserim as the base for further Burmese expeditions into Southern Siam and the Andaman Coast. In mid-1785, the Burmese king Bodawpaya amassed the Burmese troops of 144,000 men to invade Siam in five directions, known as the Nine Armies War in Thai historiography. King Rama I and his younger brother Prince Sura Singhanat could only muster 70,000 Siamese men against the Burmese invaders. The fighting concentrated on the west of Bangkok at Latya, Kanchanaburi and the north of Bangkok at Pakphing, Phitsanulok as these Burmese invasion routes directly threatened Bangkok. One of the contingents, led by the Burmese general Maha Thiri Thihathu, called Kinwun Mingyi in Thai sources, attacked Southern Siam. Maha Thiri Thihathu set sail from Mergui with 7,000 Burmese men and landed at Kraburi at the Kra Isthmus, crossing the peninsula to attack Chumphon. As the Siamese military concentrated on the north and the west, the Southern Siamese were left to themselves to fend off the Burmese invaders. Southern Siamese cities of Chumphon, Chaiya and Nakhon Si Thammarat (Ligor) surrendered to the Burmese in rapid succession. Maha Thiri Thihathu conquered and ransacked Ligor, the chief city of Southern Siam, in February 1786.

A smaller Burmese contingent of 3,000 men under Wungyi branched off from the main army of Maha Thiri Thihathu to attack Siam's Andaman Coast. Wungyi attacked Takuapa and Takua Thung in December 1785. The Siamese were caught off guard as the commissioners of the Andaman Coast, including Phraya Thammatrailok, led the defenses against the invading Burmese. Francis Light sent a message to warn Lady Chan at Pak Phra about the incoming Burmese attack. Informed about the Burmese, amidst the confusion, Lady Chan fled back from Pak Phra to Phuket. In this crisis of Burmese invasion, Phra Phimon the governor of Thalang died from illness in December 1785, leaving his wife Lady Chan, her sister Mook, her son Thian and also Phra Phimon's deputy Phra Palat Thongphun (son of Chom Thao and, therefore, half-cousin of Lady Chan) to lead the defenses of Phuket against the Burmese. In the turn of events, Phraya Thammatrailok was killed in the battle and the two other commissioners fled as the Burmese ransacked as destroyed Takuapa and Takuathung, setting eyes on Phuket next.

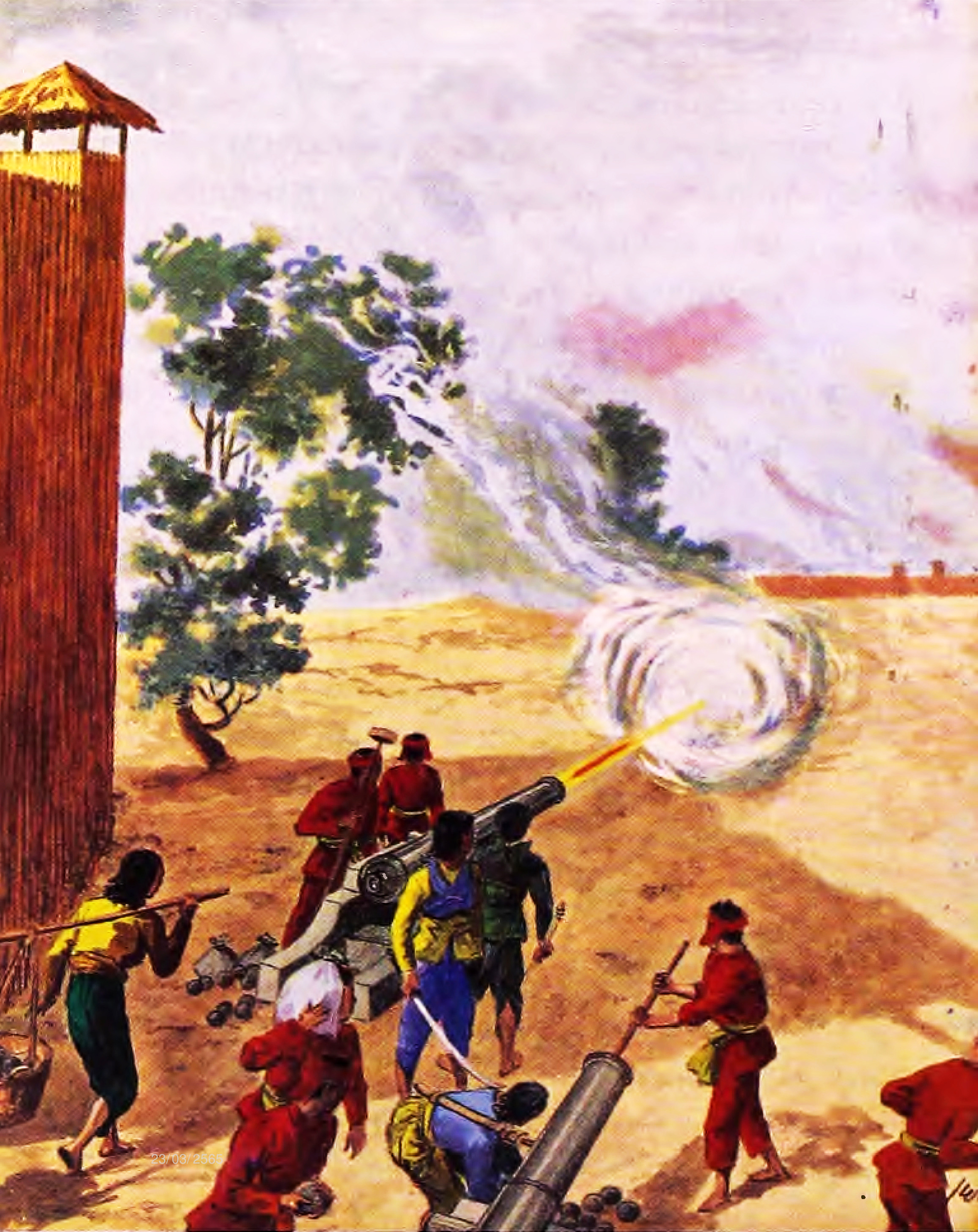
Lady Chan and Mook led people of Thalang to defend against Burmese invaders, illustrated by Hem Vejakorn (c.1969).

Being informed by Francis Light about the imminent Burmese invasion enabled Lady Chan and the Phuket elites to prepare for the upcoming attack. They established stockades over Phuket. Burmese commander Wungyi attacked Phuket in February 1786. Captain James Scott reported that the Burmese were seen off Tharuea, the main town of Phuket, on 8 February 1786. Francis Light stated that the attack composed of "3000 of the Bamar army with 80 large prows". Lady Chan, her sister Mook and her relatives in the governor's council organized the defenses of Phuket in two strongholds at Nangdak fields and Phra Nang Sang temple, each armed with a large cannon. Light also provided the Phuket defenders with muskets. Lady Chan devised a ruse to deceive the Burmese that Phuket had a large defending force. Lady Chan had Phuket women dress as men pretending to be soldiers, stationing on the walls of the stockades and marching around, also holding coconut palm fronds as fake muskets, the account that Lady Chan, later in her life, loved to tell the visitors, according to John Anderson. The letter of Chaophraya Surinthraracha to Francis Light in April 1786 provided the account: "our soldiers of Thalang were enabled to fight and hold up the Burmese for a period of one month. The Burmese suffered between 300 and 400 casualties, killed and wounded. They broke off the action and retired on Monday, 14th waxing of the fourth month in the year of Snake".

Despite being outnumbered, the Siamese were gaining upper hand in the north and the west by February 1786 when the Burmese were also ravaging Southern Siam. Prince Sura Singhanat, younger brother of the Siamese king Rama I, defeated the Burmese in the Battle of Latya in February 1786. Also in February, the Burmese king Bodawpaya called for the general retreat of the Burmese armies from Siam. In the north, the Siamese repelled the Burmese at Pakphing near Phitsanulok in March 1786. In the south, the Burmese were halted at Phatthalung by a local resistance. Bodawpaya's command for his armies to retreat would take a while to reach all of the overstretched Burmese contingents spreading over many invasion routes. As the Siamese were relieved from the north and the west, the Siamese king and his younger brother could then shift attention to Southern Siam, which had been left to the mercy of Burmese invaders. In March, Prince Sura Singhanat of the Front Palace set sail with the Siamese fleet of 20,000 to repel the Burmese from Southern Siam. Facing the main Siamese forces, Maha Thiri Thihathu and his Burmese armies on the Gulf of Siam coast were compelled to retreat. Phuket defenders, led by Lady Chan and her family, resisted the Burmese besiegers for one month. The Burmese eventually retreated from Phuket on 13 March 1786, following the general retreat command from the Burmese king, before the main Siamese military could provide any supports to Phuket.

=== Francis Light's design on Phuket ===
After failure of British East India Company to establish a settlement in Kedah, Francis Light arrived in Phuket in 1771 at the age of thirty-one. Francis Light settled permanently on Phuket in May 1772 where he had a house and a family. When Francis Light visited and presented the Siamese King Taksin with flintlocks in 1776, Light had conversations with Taksin and reported in 1777 that Taksin expressed a strong desire to cultivate a friendship with the Company. When the forces of Chaophraya Inthawongsa plundered Francis Light's house in Phuket in 1779, Light complained that "I look upon part of this island to be my property, it was granted by their own free will, the ground cleared at my expence, and tho' unjustly driven off I think myself at liberty to resume it whenever I have power.". This incident of losing his property in Phuket might be the motivation of his idea of establishing a British settlement on Phuket for Phuket was a relatively autonomous and isolated place in Siam. In 1780, Francis Light proposed to Warren Hastings the Governor-General of Bengal for establishment of a British settlement in Phuket.

It is not known where Francis Light lived during 1780–1784 but he certainly focused on reclaiming his property in Phuket. Light had cultivated a close friendly relations with Phra Phimon the governor of Thalang and his family including his wife Lady Chan. Thomas Forrest, who visited Phuket in 1784, wrote that Phra Phimon the Thalang governor was dissatisfied with the Siamese central government and would break away if he had supports. James Scott, a resident in Phuket and a friend of Francis Light, wrote to George Macartney the governor of Madras in October 1785, recommending that the British should take this opportunity of Burmese invasion of Siam to occupy Phuket. Scott pointed out that, if the Burmese attacked Phuket in late 1785, the news of this Burmese attack on Phuket would not reach Bangkok until at least April 1786, given poor Siamese communications. Scott also speculated that, as the French had already given military supports to Annam, the Annamese-French would soon join the Burmese to attack Siam from the east, (Scott perhaps misunderstood the situation as the French gave support only to Nguyễn Phúc Ánh who was still a political refugee in Bangkok and Vietnam was then largely ruled by the Tây Sơn), further complicating the situation for the Siamese and the British would be upset by French entrance into the Gulf of Siam. The British, therefore, according to Scott, should occupy Phuket as the French would soon join the debacle on the other side. Scott also stated that tin and bird nest productions in Phuket were worthy of investments.

Francis Light and his friend James Scott were the main proponents of British acquisition of Phuket. Scott took efforts to materialize his dream of seeing Phuket coming under British rule by amplifying and propagating the news and rumors of impending Burmese invasion of Phuket in late 1785 so that Scott would persuade Phra Phimon to allow Scott to construct a fort in Phuket, under the pretense of defending against Burmese invasion but instead in preparation for future British garrison in Phuket without arousing suspicions from Bangkok;

In order to enable him to put himself into a state of defence without suspicion I have improved the rumour of a Burmese War and Invasion against which he is now providing as I offered my aid to repel this invasion they mean to give me people to construct a fort which shall be sufficiently strong to serve as a place of arms and have Cajan lodging for 300 to 400 men.

However, Francis Light began to change his mind. When Francis Light arrived in Calcutta in January 1786, Light suggested to the Bengal government that the same military force that could be used to conquer Phuket could also be used to conquer Penang. Light considered both Phuket and Penang as potential British settlements. For Phuket, Light implored the British to intervene on behalf of Phuket inhabitants for "cruel oppression of Siam"; "the Inhabitants have for many years strongly solicited me to relieve them from cruel oppression of Siam, and as they are capable of defending themselves, they most want a chief in whom they can confide,". Light also suggested that Phuket and Penang could be both conquered. John Macpherson the acting governor-general of Bengal reported back to the Court of Directors of East India Company at London in January 1786 that Thalang, an island with 50,000 inhabitants, was an option for British settlement; "I shall propose possession to be taken of the Ports and Islands offered to us by the King of Cudda and especially of Junk Ceylon, which is occupied by a separate people to the number of 50,000. These have offered Captain Light the Sovereign Command among them."

The Burmese invasion of Phuket turned out not to be a mere rumor but a real threat. In February 1786, when the Burmese invading armies were attacking and besieging Thalang, Francis Light was in Calcutta persuading the Bengal government to concede to his plan of establishing a British settlement in the Malay region as, by then, the Dutch were the main Westerner with presence and the British were yet to acquire a settlement in the Malay archipelago. The Bengal government then considered the question of whether to establish a settlement on the Malay peninsula and where that place should be. A council was held in March 1786 in Calcutta, presided over by John Macpherson the acting governor-general of Bengal, to decide this issue. James Scott's letter proposal of October 1785 to seize Phuket was recorded in this council. In this letter, Scott claimed that Phra Phimon the Siamese governor of Phuket was willing to peacefully surrender the Phuket island to the British; "If the English Company will take on them the sovereignty of the Island Jan Salong and its dependencies and send a force to resist any future attempts from Siam... He will deliver them the Peaceable Possession of the Island.".

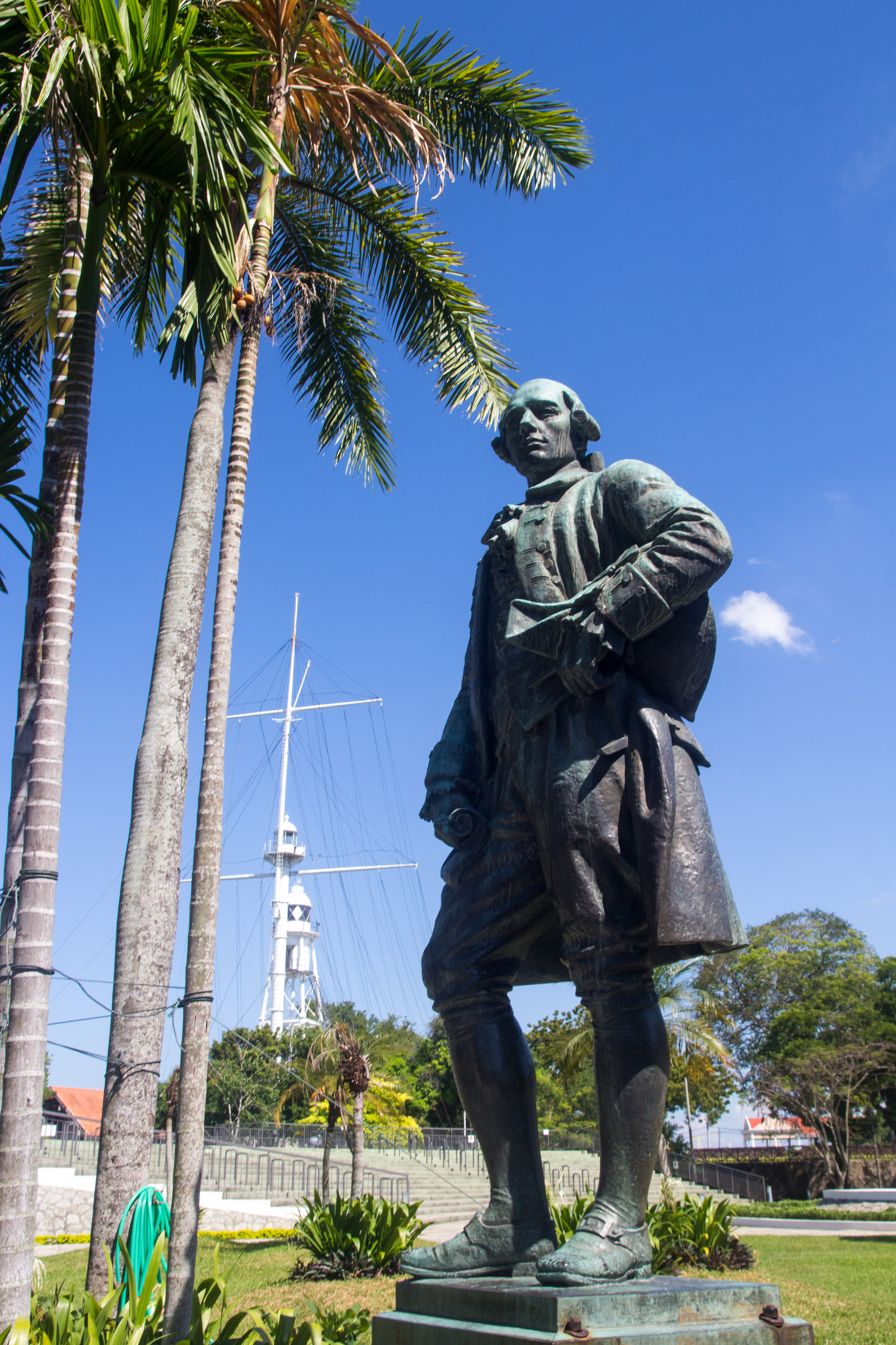
Statue of Francis Light at Fort Cornwallis, George Town, Penang

When this Calcutta council was considering British conquest of Phuket, Phra Phimon the governor of Phuket was already dead. Phra Phimon died from illness in December 1785. James Scott was apparently too optimistic about the prospect of British conquest of Phuket, asking only for two armed snows, 100 British artillery men and 500 Indian sepoys. The council then read another report of a certain Joseph Price, who recommended Penang as the better option due to geographical position. Joseph Price stated that Penang situated right on tract of commercial route to China while Thalang or Phuket was too far north. Also, ships in Phuket would be affected by the seasonal southwestern monsoon, which did not affect Penang, putting strains on sea travel. Francis Light agreed with Price in this point. The council decided in March 1786 that Penang would be the new British settlement and Phuket fell out of consideration.

Apart from geographical factor, James Scott's over-optimism was a reason of the Company's distrust on Phuket conquest plan. Scott's speculations were proven wrong when Siamese armies, under leadership of King Rama I and his younger brother Prince Sura Singhanat of the Front Palace, quickly repelled the Burmese invasions in the north and west of Siam and, by March 1786, Prince Sura Singhanat was able to sail Siamese fleets down south to repel Burmese invaders in Southern Siam, also to exert power of Siamese central governance over Southern Siam. Francis Light, James Scott, and Sultan Abdullah Mukarram Shah of Kedah were all surprised by the rapid Siamese recovery. Scott was still optimistic, saying that the premature untimely death of Phra Phimon did not affect his plan because Phra Phimon himself derived his influence from his wife Lady Chan and her family, who were, according to Scott, "great promoters of the proposed Revolution".

=== Late 18th century ===
Lady Chan the dowager governess of Thalang, her sister Muk and her family members including Thongphun the deputy governor and her son Thian, led the local Phuket people to successfully defend the island against the Burmese invaders without any assistances from the central Siamese court at Bangkok, an exceptional and rare success among Southern Siamese towns that fell to Burmese conquest in rapid succession. By March 1786, Prince Sura Singhanat of Front Palace, younger brother of King Rama I, had largely expelled the Burmese armies from Southern Siam, ending the war. The prince and his armies stayed at Songkhla, where the prince sent declarations to Northern Malay Sultanates to resume traditional bunga mas tributes to Siam. Male members of Lady Chan's family and Thalang officials went to visit Prince Sura Singhanat at Songkhla to report the events and situation. In spite of her leadership, Lady Chan could not become the governor of Thalang herself because she was a woman but the contribution of the two ladies to the defense of Phuket was recognized nevertheless. The position of governor of Thalang fell to Thongphun, who was the son of Chom Thao and half-cousin of Lady Chan, who had been the deputy under Phra Phimon. Thongphun, as the new Thalang governor, was appointed to an exceptionally high rank of Chaophraya instead of the usual rank of Phraya for the meritorious success of Phuket officials in the Burmese War. Chaophraya Thalang Thongphun was granted a golden Phan tray as the insignia for his rank, leading him to be called by the epithet Phraya Thalang Chiatthong (พระยาถลางเจียดทอง) or Phraya Thalang of the Golden Tray. Meanwhile, Thian, son of Lady Chan, was appointed as Phraya Thukkharat or vice-governor of Thalang.

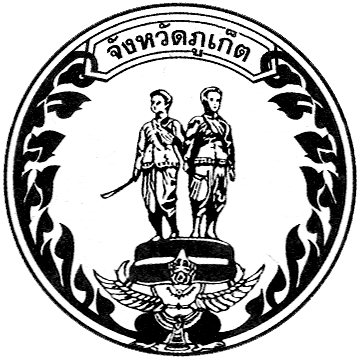
The modern Seal of the Phuket Province, featuring Lady Chan and Lady Mook, also known as Thao Thep Krasattri and Thao Si Sunthon

As Phraya Thammatrailok the Siamese superintendent of the Andaman coast was killed in the Burmese War and two other commissioners escaped, the Bangkok court appointed a new commissioner to the region. He was Chan the former Uparaja or deputy under Nakhon Nu of the Ligor regime. When King Taksin conquered the Southern Siamese Ligorian regime in 1769, Chan was probably taken as captive to Thonburi. Chan was a son of Chaophraya Chamnan Borirak, an influential minister of Ayutthaya who was de facto Chief Minister of Siam from 1733 to 1753 in the reign of King Borommakot. Chan was appointed as the royal superintendent of the tin-producing Andaman coast, including Phuket, with the title Chaophraya Surinthraracha (เจ้าพระยาสุรินทรราชา). In 1786, Chaophraya Surinthraracha arrived in Phuket, bringing royal orders to grant Lady Chan and her sister Muk the titles Thao Thepkasattri (ท้าวเทพกระษัตรี) and Thao Sisunthon (ท้าวศรีสุนทร), respectively. Thao is a Thai noble title for palace women. In April 1786, Chaophraya Surinthraracha wrote a letter to Francis Light who was known in Thai documents by his Siamese noble title Phraya Ratchakapitan and was, by then, at Calcutta;

On the occasion of recent attack on Thalang by the Burmese, because of the great merit and protective power of His Majesty the King, our soldiers of Thalang were enabled to fight and hold up the Burmese for a period of one month. The Burmese suffered between 300 and 400 casualties, killed and wounded. They broke off action and retired on Monday, 14th day waxing of the fourth month in the Year of Snake, seventh of the decade...

After the Burmese War of 1785–1786, Phuket suffered from famine and rice shortage due to the rice fields having been burnt down by the Burmese. As noted by Thomas Bowrey a century earlier, the rice paddy fields of Phuket barely fed its population and Phuket had been reliant on rice import. In his letter to Francis Light in April 1786, Chaophraya Surinthraracha asked for rice, describing the situation: "The whole region is in disorder. The Burmese burnt much rice and it is in short supply. There is insufficient to provide for the settlements until the rice is available again from the fields." Lady Chan herself wrote to Francis light in mid-1786, also asking for rice; "Because of the Burmese attacks on Thalang the district is in confusion at the present time. We are in great dearth of food." Lady Chan also related her miserable conditions to Light, describing as being "destitute, without anything", barely digging some tin to purchase rice. Light sent some rice to Phuket; "The people of Junk Ceylon after expelling the Burmese are distressed by famine, and expect another attack this season. I have sent to the people of Junk Salong 500 bags of rice, in order not to lose entirely the goodwill of the islanders." The King of Siam expected another Burmese invasion in late 1786 and ordered the Kedah Sultan to protect Phuket in the case of Burmese invasion. The Burmese did invade in early 1787, not at Phuket but rather through Three Pagodas Pass, attacking Kanchanaburi in Tha Dindaeng Campaign.

Before the Burmese War, the local Phuket elite family, which had been in power in Phuket since at least mid-eighteenth century, were of uncertain loyalty to Bangkok. After the Burmese War, the Siamese central government was able to consolidate authority over Southern Siam, including Phuket. Lady Chan and her Thalang elite family were devastated economically by the Burmese War and found themselves eclipsed in power so they decided to seek favor from the royal court at Bangkok. Appointment of the new governor of Thalang led to political conflicts between Chaophraya Thalang Thongphun the new governor of Thalang and his deputy Phraya Thukkharat Thian, who was a son of Lady Chan, representing two branches of the Thalang elite family. Thongphun was a son of Chom Thao and Lady Chan was a daughter of Chom Rang as Chom Thao and Chom Rang were half-brothers.

Anticipating Siamese aggression, Sultan Abdullah Mukkaram Shah of Kedah, who had assisted the Burmese during the Burmese invasion of Siam, negotiated with Francis Light to cede Penang Island to British East India Company in exchange for British protection of Kedah against future possible Siamese invasions. Francis Light landed at Penang in July 1786, establishing Fort Cornwallis. At Penang, Francis Light was still in correspondences with the Thalang elites and Siamese officials in Phuket, who saw Light as the source of rice and muskets. Francis Light seemed to take the side of Lady Chan and her son Phraya Thukkharat Thian in the local political rivalry in Phuket. Phraya Thukkarat Thian sent a letter to Light in 1786, thanking Light for sending rice to his mother Lady Chan and told Light that Thian and his mother Chan would soon go to Bangkok. Thian had high hope of becoming the governor of Thalang, as expressed in his letter to Light; "The royal authority has first of all appointed me Phya Thukkarat, and has said that later there would be an order making me Phya Thalang. The Front Palace Prince had been very kind to me." In the same letter, Thian told Light that he was not on good terms with Thongphun the governor of Thalang, even sending some men to enumerate the detail to Light at Penang.

At Penang, Francis Light still maintained some ideas of bringing Phuket under British rule. Light told John Macpherson that British acquisition of Phuket would keep the French and the Dutch off that coast. James Scott sent a letter to Lord Cornwallis the new Governor-General of Bengal at Calcutta in September 1786, strongly recommending British conquest of Phuket. Chaophraya Thalang Thongphun the Phuket governor sent a letter to Light at Penang in November 1787, complaining in some strong words that Captain Thomas Wilson of the snow Minerva, sent by Light to trade at Phuket, had violated trade rules in Phuket by selling merchandise directly to Phuket people at lower prices without consulting the Thalang governor, thus bypassing the monopoly of Thalang officials. Francis Light despised Thongphun the Chaophraya governor of Thalang, writing to Lord Cornwallis in June 1787; "The present Governor, titled Choo Pia Salang, is one of the greatest villains who has raised himself by ingratitude, deceit, murder and rapine from low indignant state. He wrote me a letter expressing great esteem and Friendship which I did not answer." Light also claimed that, if the British were to invade Thalang, Chaophraya Thalang would peacefully surrender the island to the British; "A few days ago he sent a Messenger to assure that if I would next November send a vessel with some Troops he would deliver the Island to the English..." Francis Light wrote this apparently to convince Lord Cornwallis to agree with his plan to conquer Phuket.

Lady Chan and her son Phraya Thukkharat Thian the deputy governor of Thalang went to Bangkok in 1788 in a clearly political move. As Thian was her son with her first husband Mom Si Phakdi, Lady Chan brought her son Nian and her daughter Thong with her second husband Phra Phimon to Bangkok. Thong was presented as a Chao Chom or minor consort to King Rama I. Consort Thong would later bore the king a daughter Princess Ubon in 1791. Nian entered Siamese central bureaucracy as a Mahatlek or royal page, starting his officialdom career. Thian, however, had a more political goal. According to the Phongsawadan (1914), Thian filed an unspecified criminal accusation against Chaophraya Thalang Thongphun the governor of Thalang at Bangkok, causing Thongphun to be later arrested and taken to Bangkok where he soon died during the interrogation. It was not stated what crimes Thian had accused Thongphun of but it might be related to Francis Light's claim that Chaophraya Thalang Thongphun was willing to surrender the Phuket island to the British. Thian and Francis Light were known to be in close correspondences and Thian might learn of his rival Thongphun's endeavors with Francis Light.

Thian was then appointed as the new governor of Thalang around 1791, known by the epithet Phraya Thalang Huet (พระยาถลางหืด) or the Asthmatic Governor of Thalang for his asthma disease. However, Ruang, younger half-brother of Thongphun the deceased governor, was still appointed as Phraya Palat the deputy governor of Thalang. In 1792, Phraya Thalang Thian the governor of Thalang wrote some letters to Francis Light at Penang with his full official title Phraya Phetkhiri Si Phichai Songkhram (พระยาเพชรคีรีศรีพิชัยสงคราม), asking Light not to forget his mother Lady Chan who was very old and ill by that time. Lady Chan presumably died shortly after her son's letter to Francis Light, around 1792, around the age of fifty-seven, having lived to see her son Thian becoming the governor of Thalang. Her father, her younger brother, her husband and her son were all governors of Thalang at some points in history.

Ascension of Thian to the governorship of Thalang coincided with the campaign of King Rama I and his younger brother Prince Sura Singhanat of the Front Palace to reconquer Tenasserim from Burma (Burmese–Siamese War of 1792–1793). Phraya Thalang Thian, like other Southern Siamese governors, was drafted to bring forces from his city to join the Siamese offensive campaign at Mergui under the Front Palace prince. The Front Palace forces were attacking Mergui when they learned that the main Siamese royal army under the Siamese king was defeated by the Burmese in the Battle of Tavoy in 1793, during which Chaophraya Mahasena Pli the Samuha Kalahom or Prime Minister of Southern Siam was killed in battle, jeopardizing the campaign, leading to eventual Siamese retreat.

In his letter to Francis Light in April 1786, Chaophraya Surinthraracha styled himself with the position of Phu Samret Ratchakarn (ผู้สำเร็จราชการ) or superintendent of Eight Districts. The Eight Districts were eight tin-producing Mueangs or towns on the Andaman Coast including Thalang, Phuket (Thalang and Phuket were listed as separate entities), Takuapa, Takuathung, Kora, Phangnga, Khura and Khurot. Surinthraracha, as the superintendent of the Andaman Coast, was responsible for procuring tin from the region and sending tin to Bangkok. Around 1791, Surinthraracha was called to Bangkok and when Chaophraya Mahasena Pli died in the Battle of Tavoy in 1793, King Rama I proposed to make Surinthraracha the new Samuha Kalahom the Prime Minister of Southern Siam to replace the deceased minister. Surinthraracha refused this offer, saying that he preferred to be an official in the periphery in Southern Siam. In exchange, Chaophraya Surinthraracha proposed a project to construct a new route to transport tin from the Andaman Coast to Bangkok. Since the time immemorial, tin from Andaman Coast had been transported in cart caravans from Takuapa across the Khao Sok Mountain to Ban Don (modern Surat Thani), where it would be carried further along the Gulf of Siam coast to Central Siam, in the trans-peninsular route. This old route was far from effective as a great number of tin cargo were lost on the route due to rugged terrain. In 1804, Chaophraya Surinthraracha established a new safer route to transport tin from Phuket to Bangkok, going from Nanghong Mountain near modern Phangnga through Marui, Paklao, Pakdan (all in modern Thap Put district), Pak Phanom (Phanom district), Phunphin and henceforth to Phumriang (in Chaiya), a flatter, less rugged path to carry tin to Bangkok.

=== Burmese Invasion of 1809–1810 ===
After waging wars with each other continuously since 1760, Burma and Siam attempted diplomatic overtures in 1808. A peace, however, did not materialize as the Burmese King Bodawpaya organized yet another campaign to invade and conquer Siam in 1809. Bodawpaya ordered Atwinwun to lead the campaign. First, Atwinwun gathered and organized men at Martaban. However, this campaign suffered many shortcomings including desertions. The Burmese governor of Martaban then proposed to the Burmese King that Burma had better maintain a peaceful relation with Siam because mismanagement of Atwinwun had doomed this campaign from the start. Bodawpaya agreed to halt the campaign but Atwinwun himself pleaded to Bodawpaya that the resources had been gathered at Martaban and should not be left to waste. Burma should at least attack the Siamese Andaman Coast. Bodawpaya agreed with Atwinwun's proposal and allowed him to proceed his campaign to invade the Siamese Andaman Coast to the south. King Rama I of Siam died in September 1809, succeeded by his son King Rama II.

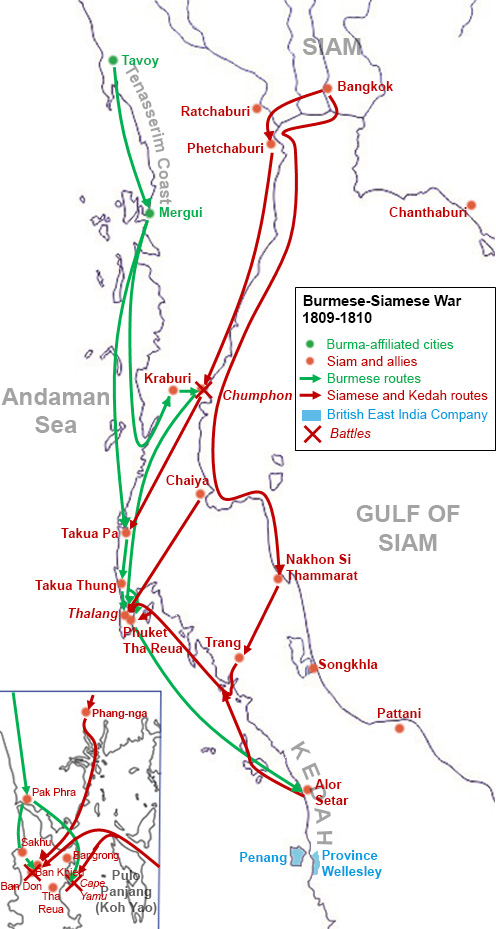
During 1809–1810, the Burmese from Tenasserim attacked Southern Siam, leading to the Fall of Thalang to Burmese invaders in January 1810

In October 1809, from Tavoy, Atwinwun sent the Burmese army of 4,000 men; 3,000 men under Nga U the governor of Tavoy and 1,000 men under Thinka Thuriya the governor of Mergui, to invade and attack Siamese Andaman Coast. Another 3,000 Burmese men crossed the Tenasserim Hills at Kraburi to attack Chumphon on the Gulf of Siam coast. The Siamese court was caught relatively off guard as King Rama II sent Siamese armies of 20,000 men under his younger brother Prince Senanurak of the Front Palace to deal with the Burmese at Chumphon. Siamese military were more concerned about the Burmese attacking Chumphon as it would threaten Bangkok. Burmese governors of Tavoy and Mergui, with their 4,000 Burmese men, attacked and quickly conquered Takua Pa and Takua Thung, proceeding to attack Phuket, landing at Sakhu on the northwestern corner of Phuket island in November 1809. The Burmese laid siege on Thalang citadel of Tharuea. Phraya Thalang Thian the governor of Thalang, son of Lady Chan, organized the defenses of Thalang against the Burmese invaders. However, the initial Burmese siege was short-lived as Thalang defenders broke through the Burmese siege on 18 November 1809. Nga U the governor of Tavoy died from illness while Thinka Thuriya the governor of Mergui was given death penalty by Atwinwun for his failure to conquer Phuket.

By November 1809, the Siamese court was informed about the Burmese attack on Phuket so King Rama II sent Chaophraya Yommaraj Noi to join with Chaophraya Nakhon Phat the governor of Nakhon Si Thammarat (Ligor) with Siamese forces to repel the Burmese from Phuket. Yommaraj Noi and Nakhon Phat built Siamese fleet at Trang in order to relieve Phuket of Burmese attack. Sultan Ahmad Tajuddin Halim Shah II of Kedah also sent Kedahan Malay fleet under the Laksamana to join Siamese defenses under Phra Borirak Phubet the adoptive son of Ligor governor.

Atwinwun the Burmese commander at Tavoy was eager to conquer Phuket. Atwinwun appointed Nga Chan as new vanguard commander to lead the Burmese forces to attack and lay siege on Thalang again in January 1810. Phraya Thalang Thian the governor of Phuket, thinking that the Burmese invasion was over, had loosened the defenses. Phraya Thalang Thian was caught off guard as the Burmese under Nga Chan invaded and laid siege on Thalang citadel for the second time in January 1810. Upon reaching Trang, Chaophraya Yommaraj Noi the Siamese commander faced a major logistical problem. There was not enough vessels to transport massive Siamese troops to Phuket. Yommaraj Noi and Nakhon Phat the Ligor governor had to build the fleet at Trang from scratch, not in time to relieve Phuket of Burmese attack. Yommaraj Noi managed to send a preliminary Siamese fleet under Phraya Thainam from Trang to repel the Burmese from Phuket. Phraya Thainam met the Burmese at Cape Jamu on the eastern shore of Phuket, leading to the Battle of Jamu, which the Burmese persisted and Thainam himself was killed in an accidental gunpowder explosion. After driving the Burmese from Chumphon, Prince Senanurak sent Phraya Thotsayotha to bring 6,000 Siamese men from Chaiya to help Phuket. However, Phraya Thotsayotha also faced the same problem, lacking boats to transport Siamese men to Phuket, being stranded ashore at Pak Phra.

With the main Siamese force under Chaophraya Yommaraj was stranded ashore at Trang, unable to reach Phuket, Thalang could stand no more against the Burmese siege. Tharuea, the main town and citadel of Phuket, fell on 13 January 1810 to the Burmese, who plundered the Phuket island and burnt all settlements to the grounds. Phraya Thalang Thian the governor of Phuket, son of Lady Chan, was taken as prisoner-of-war by the Burmese. All Phuket inhabitants fled ashore in great numbers to take refuge at Phangnga. Burmese destruction of all human settlements on Phuket in January 1810 was through and devastative. Jean-Baptiste Pallegoix, in his Description du Royaume Thai ou Siam (1854), provided an account from M.Rabeau, a French missionary who lived in Phuket during the Burmese attacks;

Towards the end of November 1809, the Burmese laid siege to Jongselang town. After four weeks of a very bloody siege, the fortress,–the hope and refuge of all inhabitants of the island,–was taken and burnt to ashes by the enemy. Some of the inhabitants were killed; remnants were either made prisoners or sought safety in the woods... After having pillaged everything at Jongselang, the Burmese embarked for a place nearby.

The Burmese occupied Phuket island for two months. In March 1810, Chaophraya Yommaraj Noi was eventually able to construct a fleet at Trang. From Trang, Phra Borirak Phubet led the combined Malay–Siamese fleet with the Kedahan Laksamana to repel the Burmese and to reconquer Phuket. Phraya Thotsayotha was also able to build a Siamese fleet from Pak Phra to attack Phuket from the north. Facing the arriving Siamese fleet, Nga Chan the Burmese commander and occupier of Phuket decided to retreat without engaging with the incoming Siamese. The Siamese, however, left Phuket island ruined and abandoned without proper rehabilitation as the island had been devastated to great extent by the Burmese attacks. Atwinwun the supreme Burmese commander at Tavoy was not satisfied with such premature, unnecessary Burmese retreat from Phuket so Atwinwun put Nga Chan to death. Atwinwun sent another Burmese fleet of 6,000 men under Sibo Wun from Tavoy to attack Phuket again in May 1810 but the fleet was wrecked and destroyed by the seasonal monsoon. Sibo Wun led the surviving Burmese men to land ashore at Takua Pa and marched them to Phuket. There was no resistances on the journey as the Siamese Andaman coast was deserted. The Burmese entered Phuket again but found the island in ruins and abandoned without any food nor provisions. The Burmese under Sibo Wun were unable to stand dire conditions in Phuket and were eventually obliged to leave.
