= Burmese–Siamese War (1809–1812) =

Military conflict

- Part of the Burmese–Siamese wars
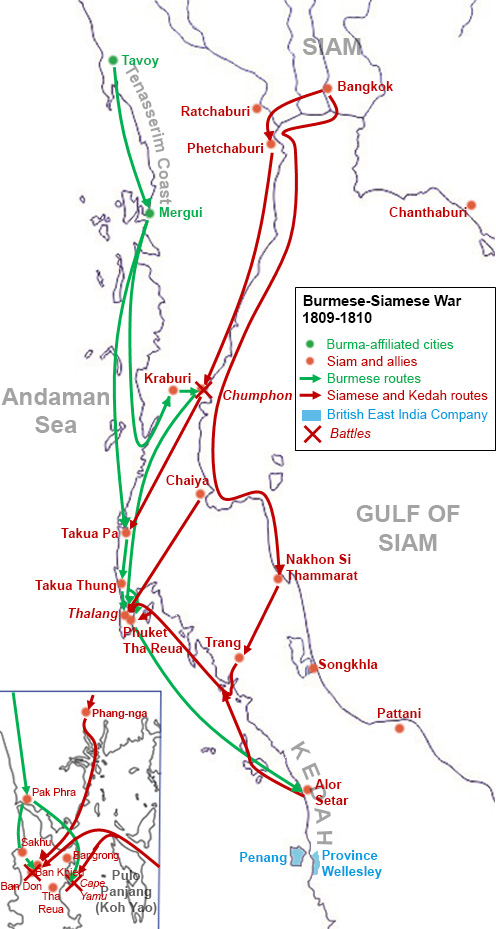
- Map showing the army routes. Green represents Burmese army routes. Red represents Siamese and Kedah army routes.
Date	June 1809 – January 1812
Location	Junk Ceylon (Phuket), Southern Siam
Result	Siamese and Kedahan victory; Phuket and many other Southern Siamese towns depopulated for several decades

Belligerents
Konbaung dynasty (Burma)	Rattanakosin Kingdom (Siam); Kedah

Commanders and leaders
Bodawpaya; Atwinwun; Nga Chan; Thuriya Thaya Kyaw; Nga U Thinka Thuriya; Sibo Wun; Toya Bo; Zeya Thuriya Kyaw (POW)	Rama II; Prince Maha Senanurak; Chaophraya Yommaraj Noi; Chaophraya Nakhon Phat; Phraya Chasaenyakorn Bua; Phraya Thalang Thien (POW); Sultan Tajuddin; Laksamana probably Tunku Yahya

Units involved
Royal Burmese Army; Royal Burmese Navy	Royal Siamese Army; Royal Siamese Navy; Kedah Army

Strength
October 1809; 7,000 men 60 war boats 200 swivel guns May 1810; 6,000 men December 1811 5,000 men	18 November 1809; Reinforcements including: 6,000 men 20 war boats May 1810; Less than 10,000 men December 1811 10,000 men

Casualties and losses
+10,110 men 40 war boats	Unknown

The Burmese–Siamese War (1809–1812) or the Burmese Invasion of Thalang was an armed conflict fought between Burma under Konbaung dynasty and Siam under the Chakri dynasty, during the period of June 1809 and January 1812. The war centered on the control of the Phuket Island, also known as Thalang or Junk Ceylon, and the tin rich Andaman Coast. The war also involved the Kedah Sultanate. This occasion was the last Burmese offensive expedition into Siamese territories in Thai history, with British acquisition of the Tenasserim Coast in 1826, following the First Anglo-Burmese War, removing several hundred miles of the existing land border between Siam and Burma. The war also left Phuket devastated and depopulated for many decades until its reemergence as a tin mining center in the late 19th century.

== Background ==
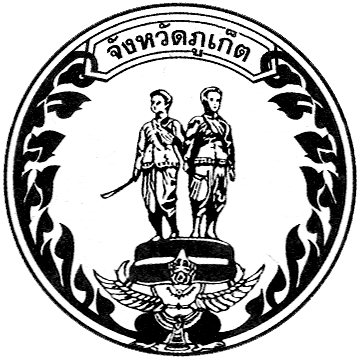
The modern Seal of the Phuket Province, featuring Lady Chan and Lady Mook, also known as Thao Thep Krasattri and Thao Si Sunthon

Since 1759, Siam and Burma have been in a near-constant state of conflict for over fifty years. In the late 18th century, the Burmese destroyed the Siamese capital at Ayutthaya and the city of Phitsanulok, the center of Northern authority for over two centuries. In turn, Burma has lost its Lan Na and Kengtung vassals to a resurgent Siamese regime. Large swathes of central Mainland Southeast Asia experienced severe depopulation as a result of the 50 year conflict.

King Bodawpaya of the Konbaung dynasty and King Rama I of the Chakri dynasty had engaged in several wars since 1785 including the Nine Armies' War (1785-86), the Wars over Tavoy (1792-93) and the Wars over Lanna (1802-1805). During the Nine Armies' War in 1786, the Burmese forces invaded Thalang or Phuket Island. Lady Chan, the wife of the late governor of Thalang, together with her sister Lady Mook, organized the defenses of Thalang and managed to repel the Burmese invaders. Lady Chan and Lady Mook were awarded with the titles Thao Thep Krasattri and Thao Si Sunthon, respectively. In 1789, Thien, a son of Lady Chan, became Phraya Thalang or the governor of Thalang.

In the early nineteenth century, there were two major settlements on the Phuket Island; the town of Thalang was the main town on the island situated on the central plains (modern Thalang District) and the port town of "Phuket Tha Reua" (not be confused with the modern city of Phuket, which was founded in 1827) situated on Ao Sapam on the eastern shore.

After many exhausting wars, the two kingdoms of Burma and Siam finally pursued diplomacy. In 1808, King Bodawpaya sent a diplomatic mission to Bangkok, who responded by sending reciprocal mission. Through these contacts, however, King Bodawpaya learned that most of the Siamese generals that had been active during the previous wars had already died. Prince Maha Sura Singhanat, the champion of many campaigns, had died in 1803. King Rama I himself was also in an old age. King Bodawpaya then initiated the new expedition to invade Siam.

King Bodawpaya ordered Atwinwun to go to Martaban to muster an expeditionary force to invade Siam. However, Atwinwun was unable to effectively organize an army as his regiment faced desertions. Thakin Mongmu the governor of Martaban then petitioned to the Burmese king that the campaign could not be carried on because of Atwinwun's mismanagement and Burma had better maintain peaceful relations with Siam. King Bodawpaya then called the campaigns to halt. However, Atwinwun pleaded to the king that the resources were already invested on the prospective campaign and he should at least dispatch the expedition on the Andaman Coast. King Bodawpaya agreed and allowed Atwinwun to proceed. Atwinwun marched his army from Martaban to Tavoy in July 1809.

King Rama I died in September 1809. He was succeeded by his son Prince Isarasundhorn of the Front Palace as King Rama II. King Rama II also appointed his younger brother as Prince Maha Senanurak of the Front Palace.

== Burmese preparations ==
In October 1809, Atwinwun, who stayed at Tavoy, arranged for the Burmese navy forces with total number of 7,000 men to invade Siam;

- Nga U the governor of Tavoy with 3,000 men
- Thinka Thuriya the governor of Mergui with 1,000 men

totally 4,000 men to invade Southern Siam and Andaman Coast

- Thuriya Thaya Kyaw with 3,000 men to cross the Tenasserim Hills at Kraburi to invade the towns on the Gulf of Siam on the eastern coast.

== Siamese preparations ==
The Siamese speculated the invasion route crossing the Tenasserim Hills and through Chumphon and Phetchaburi to Bangkok. King Rama II raised the armies of 20,000 men to counter Burmese offensives in the following manner;

- Prince Maha Senanurak of the Front Palace, the king's younger brother, as the grand commander.
- Prince Phithakmontri (the king's cousin) and Chaophraya Pollathep Sa would station at Phetchaburi.
- Phraya Chasaenyakorn Bua would lead the vanguard of 5,000 men to face the Burmese at Chumphon.

== Burmese Invasion of Thalang ==
Nga U the governor of Tavoy led the Burmese fleet into the Andaman Coast. He commanded Zeya Thuriya Kyaw to attack Takua Pa, which surrendered without fighting. From Takua Pa, the Burmese fleet disembarked and marched by land to Pak Phra (modern Phang Nga). From Pak Phra, Nga U divided his forces into 3,000 men each led by Thinka Thuriya the governor of Mergui and Zeya Thuriya Kyaw to attack the town of Thalang on Phuket Island.

=== First Burmese invasion (November 1809) ===
Phraya Thalang Thien the governor of Thalang organized the town defenses and reported the Burmese invasion to the Bangkok court. The Burmese landed at Ban Sakhu at the northwestern shore of the island in November 1809. At Sakhu, Zeya Thuriya Kyaw defeated a small Siamese regiment and proceeded to Ban Takhien in the central plains. Zeya Thuriya Kyaw and Thinka Thuriya laid siege on Thalang, leading to the siege of Thalang. In November 1809, Zeya Thuriya Kyaw led an attack onto the Thalang citadel but was repelled. On the night of 18 November 1809, the Siamese garrison of the Thalang repelled a Burmese assault on the citadel. The Siamese cannons inflicted heavy casualties on the Burmese side.

King Rama II assigned additional forces to relieve Thalang;

- Chaophraya Yommaraj Noi would lead the Bangkokian army with Phraya Thainam as vanguard to join with Chaophraya Nakhon Phat the governor of Nakhon Si Thammarat to relieve Thalang of their siege.
- Phraya Thotsayotha to lead an army from Chaiya to Pak Phra (Phang Nga) to assist Thalang.

Nga U, the commander and the governor of Tavoy, fell ill and died at Takua Pa. Zeya Thuriya Kyaw and Thinka Thuriya decided to retreat from Thalang to Pakchan, Ranong. The first siege of Thalang was then over. Atwinwun the supreme commander at Tavoy, however, ordered both Zeya Thuriya Kyaw and Thinka Thuriya to be executed for their failures. Zeya Thuriya Kyaw pleaded to Atwinwun for a second chance and was spared.

The Siamese relief forces under Chaophraya Yommaraj Noi reached Nakhon Si Thammarat in November 1809. Together with Chaophraya Nakhon Phat, Yommaraj Noi led the Siamese armies to Trang. Sultan Ahmad Tajuddin Halim Shah II of Kedah was also compelled to send Malay navy forces under the command of the Laksamana (who later became Bendahara Maharaja Sura) of Kedah to aid the Siamese at Trang.

=== Second Burmese invasion (January 1810) ===
Phraya Thalang Thien the governor, upon seeing the Burmese retreat, thought that the invasion was over and loosened the defenses. He opened the gates for the inhabitants to return to their normal life. However, in January 1810, Atwinwun organized the new invasion of Thalang. Atwinwun appointed Nga Chan as the new commander of the invading forces. Nga Chan was joined by Thuriya Thaya Kyaw who had been defeated by the Siamese at Chumphon and retreated to join Nga Chan at Thalang. Nga Chan invaded the Phuket island in two directions, both at Ban Sakhu to the northwest and at Phuket Tha Ruea to the east. Facing two-pronged attacks, Phraya Thalang Thien was unable to assembly forces in time and was left with few garrisons in the citadel.

The Siamese generals - Yommaraj Noi at Trang and Phraya Thotsayotha at Pak Phra - faced a major problem. They lacked adequate ships to transport the forces across the sea to Phuket. The Siamese had to construct the fleet from the rabbles. Fearing that Thalang would fall to the Burmese, Yommaraj Noi had Phraya Thainam assemble local boats into a fleet to engage with the Burmese at Phuket. Thainam led a small Siamese fleet to meet the Burmese on the eastern shores of Phuket at the Cape Jamu, leading the Battle of Jamu. The Burmese were defeated. However, the Siamese gunpower keg accidentally exploded and killed many Siamese personnel including Phraya Thainam.

With the Siamese relief forces at doorstep, Nga Chan the Burmese commander pressed on to take Thalang. The town of Thalang fell on 13 January 1810. The town was looted, plundered and burnt to the grounds. Phraya Thalang Thien the governor was captured as prisoner-of-war to Burma. The inhabitants of the town fled en masse ashore to Phang Nga. Nga Chan sent a letter to Norman Macalister the governor of Prince of Wales Island to declare his victory and assured his peaceful intentions towards the British East India Company. Nga Chan also sent a Mergui man who was a brother-in-law of the Kedah Laksamana to deliver a letter to the Sultan of Kedah, urging him to submit and present the bunga mas to King Bodawpaya of Burma. Sultan Ahmad Tajuddin Halim Shah of Kedah replied that the Siamese had maintained a garrison at Alor Setar and the Burmese should invade and defeat the Siamese there first.

In March 1810, the Siamese at Pak Phra and Trang had successfully mustered its fleets. Nakhon Phat had his adoptive son Phra Borrirak Phubetr, together with the Kedahan Laksamana, lead the combined Siamese-Malay fleet to attack the Burmese at Phuket. Phraya Thotsayotha also sailed from Pak Phra. It was in this moment that Phuket was hit by a storm. Nga Chan the Burmese commander, upon hearing the sounds of the winds, thought that a massive Siamese army was coming and decided to retreat and abandon Thalang. The Siamese was able to reclaim Thalang. However, the town was left mostly in ruins and its population dispersed.

For their failures, Atwinwun at Tavoy ordered the executions of Nga Chan and Thuriya Thaya Kyaw the Burmese commanders. Atwinwun also executed the total of eight commanders and imprisoned others. King Bodawpaya, upon learning of Atwinwun's severe punishment of his subordinates, sent Toya Bo to Tavoy to carry out the royal orders to release the imprisoned generals.

=== Third Burmese invasion (May 1810) ===
In May 1810, Atwinwun of Tavoy sent another expedition to Phuket. He appointed Sibo Wun as the commander of the fleet of 6,000 men with Toya Bo as vanguard. Unfortunately, however, this expedition coincided with the monsoon season of the Andaman Coast. The fleet set off from Tavoy but was inflicted by the severe monsoons. Several ships were wrecked and the Burmese soldiers drowned to their deaths. Sibo Wun and Toya Bo led their fleet to take refuge at Takua Pa, where they disembarked and went on by land. The Burmese army marched to Pak Phra and crossed the straits by boat to Phuket. Sibo Wun and Toya Bo took Thalang, which was then an abandoned town in ruins.

From Thalang, Sibo Wun sent the brother-in-law of the Kedahan Laksamana to lead a diplomatic fleet to Alor Setar. However, the Laksamana of Kedah refused to let the Burmese ships to enter Kuala Kedah, saying that they should instead conducted their talks on the Penang Island. The Burmese mission then landed on Penang, waiting for the response of Kedah. The Burmese at Thalang was in dire conditions as the ruinous island did not provide much supplies and they ran out of food resources. Sibo Wun sent Zeya Thuriya Kyaw, the disgraced commander of the previous campaign, to sail a boat to buy rice rations at Mergui. Zeya Thuriya Kyaw faced a severe monsoon and shipwrecked at Takua Pa. He tried to return to Thalang by land but was captured by Siamese authorities.

== Gulf of Siam Coastal Front ==
In December 1809, Atwinwun commanded Thuriya Thaya Kyaw to lead the Burmese army crossing the Tenasserim Hills to attack Chumphon. The town of Chumphon fell to the Burmese. Prince Maha Senanurak of the Front Palace left Bangkok and reached Phetchaburi in December 1809. Prince Maha Senanurak commanded Phraya Chasaenyakorn Bua to bring the Siamese vanguard from Petchaburi to attack the Burmese at Chumphon, leading to the Battle of Chumphon in January 1810. Thuriya Thaya Kyaw was defeated and the Burmese retreated towards Takua Pa to the southwest. Chasaenyakorn Bua followed the retreating Burmese to Pak Phra where he met Phraya Thotsayotha. Many Burmese were captured as war prisoners and sent to the prince at Petchaburi. Thuriya Thaya Kyaw fled to join Nga Chan at Thalang.

Later in March 1810, when the Burmese were defeated at Thalang, Atwinwin ordered Thuriya Thaya Kyaw to be executed for his failures along with Nga Chan.

== Conclusion ==
The Burmese invasions of Thalang in 1809-1810 greatly devastated the Siamese settlements on the Phuket Island. For fifteen years, Phuket remained a desolate island with no major settlements. Most of its former inhabitants had fled ashore to establish the town of Phang Nga. In 1825, the town of Thalang was restored but it took many decades for Phuket to achieve the pre-war level in population. Later, the modern city of Phuket was founded on the southern portion of the island as a tin mine settlement and emerged as the most important city on the island.

The Burmese-Siamese War of 1809-1812 was the last Burmese incursion into Thai territories. Just fourteen years later, Burma would be embroiled in a large-scale war with the British over Assam, from which the Burmese would lose the Tenasserim Coast. As Tenasserim was the base for Burmese invasions into Siam on many occasions and the Burmese having to pay large war indemnities to the British, the Burmese threats to Siam were all nearly extinguished, except for the North.

== See also ==
- Burmese–Siamese wars
- Burma–Thailand relations
- Malaysia–Thailand relations
- History of Phuket
