= Sakdiphonlasep =

Viceroy of Siam

Sakdiphonlasep; ศักดิพลเสพ
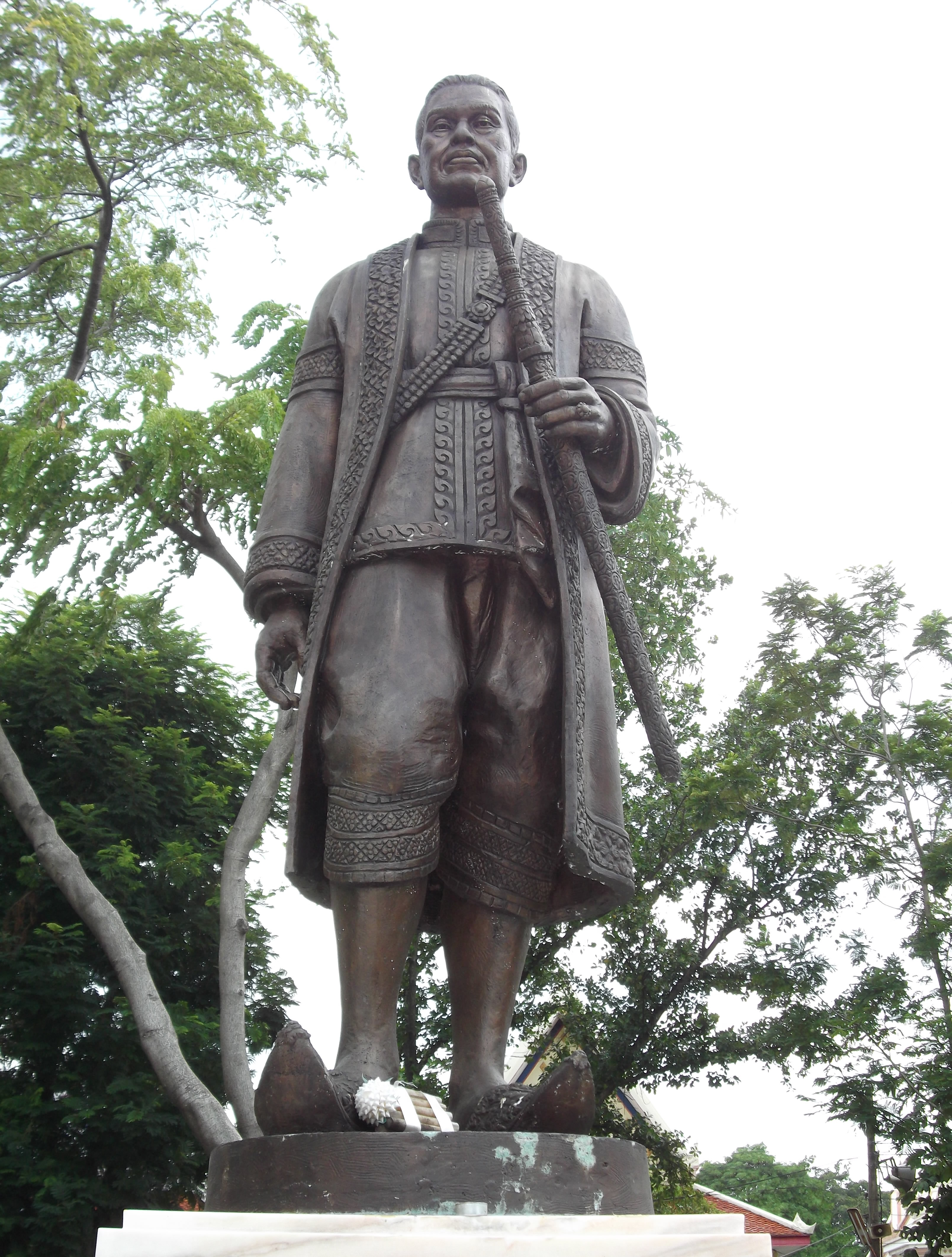

Viceroy of Rattanakosin
- Tenure: 21 July 1824 – 1 May 1832
- Appointer: Nangklao (Rama III)
- Predecessor: Maha Senanurak
- Successor: Pinklao (Chutamani)
- Born: 21 October 1785; Kingdom of Siam
- Died: 1 May 1832 (aged 46); Bangkok, Siam
- Spouses: Princess Daravadi; Various consorts
- Issue: 20 sons and daughters
- Dynasty: Chakri
- Father: Phutthayotfa Chulalok (Rama I)
- Mother: Nuiyai of Nakhon Si Thammarat
- Religion: Theravada Buddhism

Somdet Phra Bawonratchao Maha Sakdiphonlasep (Thai: สมเด็จพระบวรราชเจ้ามหาศักดิพลเสพ; 21 October 1785 – 1 May 1832) was the viceroy appointed by Nangklao as the titular heir to the throne as he was the uncle to the king.

Prince Arunotai was the son of King Phutthayotfa Chulalok (Rama I) and his concubine Princess Nuiyai of Nakhon Si Thammarat. He was later appointed the Kromma Muen Sakdiphonlasep and became acquitted with his half-nephew Kromma Muen Chetsadabodin during the wars with Burma. Kromma Muen Chetsadabodin was crowned as King Nangklao (Rama III) in 1824 and, consequently, Sakdiphonlasep was made the "Second King". He led the Siamese armies into Isan to fight with King Anouvong of Vientiane in 1826.

Sakdiphonlasep ordered the construction of the Bowonniwet Temple (lit. temple where the Front Palace lived) where Prince Mongkut (future Rama IV) became an abbot. In 1829, he ordered the Buddha Chinnasri – a 900-year-old Sukhothai Buddha statue from Pitsanulok – to be floated along the river and placed at the Bowonniwet Temple.

His funeral procession was held 2 April 1833, with cremation set for seven days later. The king, through the Phraklang, invited US diplomat Edmund Roberts and party to witness the procession, which Roberts describes in journal. Roberts notes that one of the sons of the wang-na watches at the temple, near the funeral pile, night and day, till the body is consumed; the ashes of the consumed body are then thrown into the river with many ceremonies; and the unconsumed bones are then delivered to the priests, and made into household gods [sic]. (Roberts refers to Buddhist monks as "Talapoy," from Portuguese talapão from Burmese tala poi our lord.)

Sakdiphonlasep House of Chakri Born: 21 October 1785 Died: 1 May 1832
Regnal titles
| Vacant Title last held by Maha Senanurak | Viceroy of Rattanakosin; 21 July 1824 – 1 May 1832 | Vacant Title next held by Pinklao |
