= Maha Senanurak =

Viceroy of Siam

Maha Senanurak; มหาเสนานุรักษ์

Viceroy of Rattanakosin
- Tenure: 7 September 1809 – 16 July 1817
- Appointer: Phutthaloetla Naphalai (Rama II)
- Predecessor: Itsarasunthon (later Rama II)
- Successor: Sakdiphonlasep
- Born: 29 March 1773; Thonburi, Thonburi
- Died: 16 July 1817 (aged 44); Bangkok, Siam
- Spouses: Princess Samlee; Various consorts
- Issue: 40 sons and daughters, including: Pavares Variyalongkorn
- Dynasty: Chakri
- Father: Phutthayotfa Chulalok (Rama I)
- Mother: Amarindra
- Religion: Theravada Buddhism

Maha Senanurak (Thai: สมเด็จพระบวรราชเจ้ามหาเสนานุรักษ์; 29 March 1773 – 16 July 1817) was a Viceroy appointed by his brother Phutthaloetla Naphalai as the titular heir to the throne. Maha Senanurak was known for his leadership of the Siamese campaign against the Burmese invasion of Thalang in 1809.

== Early life ==
Chui was born to Chao Phraya Chakri (future King Phutthayotfa Chulalok or Rama I) and his wife Nak (future Queen Amarindra) in 1773. In 1782, Chao Phraya Chakri crowned himself as the first monarch of the Chakri dynasty of Siam at Bangkok. Chui was then made a prince. He was later awarded the title Krom Khun Senanurak. Prince Senanurak was known to be close to his only true brother Prince and Front Palace Isarasundhorn (future Phutthaloetla Naphalai or Rama II). In 1807 Prince Isarasundhorn made his brother Prince Senanurak his successor to the Front Palace (Thai: พระบัณฑูรน้อย). In 1809, King Phutthayotfa Chulalok died. As a result, the Front Palace Isarasundhorn ascended the throne as King. The new King appointed Prince Senanurak as the next the Front Palace lord, and as his successor.

== Countering the Burmese invasions ==
In 1809 King Bodawpaya of Burma sent his troops to invade Thalang (modern Phuket.) Phutthaloetla Naphalai sent Maha Senanurak to counter this invasion. Around the same time Prince Kasatranuchit, a son of King Taksin of Thonburi and his sister Princess Chimyai, staged a rebellion to reclaim the throne. The rebellion was quickly suppressed by Prince Chetsadabodin (future King Rama III). Maha Senanurak's wife, Princess Samlee, a daughter of Taksin, was executed for treason.

== Death ==
Senanurak fell ill and died in 1817. For the rest of his reign King Rama II refused to appoint a new Front Palace, perhaps leading to the brief confusion in the succession between his sons Chetsadabodin and Mongkut after his death in 1824.

Maha Senanurak House of Chakri Born: 29 March 1773 Died: 16 July 1817
Regnal titles
Preceded by Itsarasunthon	Viceroy of Rattanakosin; 7 September 1809 – 16 July 1817	Vacant Title next held by Sakdiphonlasep
