= Gerolamo Emilio Gerini =

- Phra Sarasasana Balakhandh (พระสารสาสน์พลขันธ์)
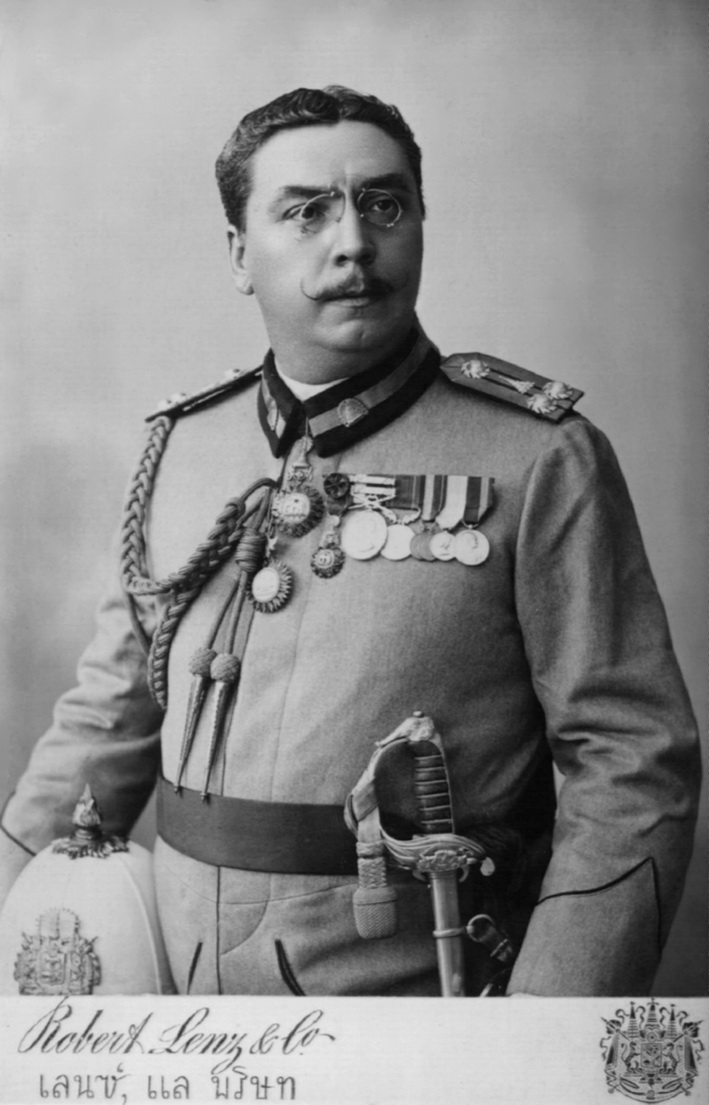
- Gerolamo Emilio Gerini in dress uniform

Phra Sarasasana Balakhandh
- Tenure: 1 April 1897 – 10 January 1905
- Born: March 1, 1860; Cisano sul Neva, Kingdom of Sardinia
- Died: 1913 (aged 52–53); Turin, Kingdom of Italy
- Buried: Cisano sul Neva, Kingdom of Italy
- Royal Siamese Armed Forces
- Allegiance: Thailand
- Branch: (Thailand) Royal Siamese Army
- Service years: 1881–1883, 1887–1906
- Rank: Colonel
- Commands: General Director of Military Education

Siamese's secretary of the northern division
- In office 1883–1887
- Monarch: Chulalongkorn
- Royal Italian Armed Forces
- Allegiance: Italy
- Branch: (Italy) Royal Italian Army
- Service years: 1879–1881
- Rank: Second lieutenant of infantry

Gerolamo Emilio Gerini (Thai: พระสารสาสน์พลขันธ์, RTGS: Phra Sarasat Phonlakhan) was born in Cisano sul Neva, Province of Savona, Kingdom of Sardinia on March 1, 1860. He was the elder son of Carlo, Professor of Oenology at the University of Turin and Veronica Rosso. After the primary studies he gets a scholarship for talented students and enters the Royal Military Academy of Modena. In August 1879 he graduated second lieutenant of infantry, and was assigned to the 13° Regiment “Pinerolo” in Perugia. In September 1881 he moved to Bangkok, Thailand (then Siam) and joined the Siamese Army where he became a lieutenant.

In 1883 he left the Army to serve as the secretary of the minister of the northern division, Maha Mala, uncle of Rama V, King Chulalongkorn, in such assignment he travels and visits most of the Country, acquiring a perfect mastery of Thai language and also of other local languages, such as Malay, Burmese, Mon, Khmer and many local dialects. Moreover, mastered and deeply studied both Sanskrit and Pali, the language of the Buddhist sacred texts.

In 1887 he backed to the Siamese Army, with the degree of Major and the title of Luang and the position of General Director of Military Education. On 1 April 1897, he received the title of Phra Sarasat Phonlakhan and 800 Sakdina, the Siamese noble title with which he is still today known in Thailand. He was the first Director of the renovated Royal Cadets' School (from which draw origin both the Royal Army Training Command and the Chulachomklao University, Royal Military Academy of Thailand) he had remained in such position until 10 January 1905, when he retired, with the rank of Colonel, the title of Phra and many important honours and decorations.

Beyond his profession as General Director of the Military Education, Gerini was a geographer, an archaeologist, an ethnologist, a linguist, and a historian. He directed for many years at Yutthako, still today the official magazine of the Royal Thai Army, and contributed to it, for more than twenty years, a relevant number of essays and articles, not only on military subjects, but also ranging in the many different fields in which he directed his researches.

With two other scholars (Oskar Frankfurter and A. Cecil Carter) in 1904, under the High Patronage of Prince Vajiravudh (later King Rama VI) he was a driving force to establish the Siam Society, to promote knowledge of the culture of Thailand and its surrounding region, still today very active and probably the most important institution in its field. Back in Europe he was often appointed by the Siamese Court and the King Rama V, who trusted and prized him, for official diplomatic and military missions and to represent Siam in Orientalists’ and Archaeologists’ Conferences.

In 1909, King Rama V Chulalongkorn appointed Gerini as Curator and Director of the Siamese Pavilion at the International Exhibition of Turin 1911. In 1911, King Vittorio Emanuele III conferred on him the Cross of Grand Officer of the Kingdom of Italy. He was life-time Honorary Member of the Siam Society and an active and appreciated Member of the Royal Asiatic Society, the Royal Geographical Society, Correspondent of the French, École française d'Extrême-Orient, Member of the Italian, Società degli Orientalisti.

During his life of studies and researches he collected a rare book more than 3,000 volumes. His heirs donated his books to the "Istituto Orientale di Napoli" and "L'Orientale Università degli studi di Napoli L'Orientale", a section of University of Naples Federico II.

Gerini died in 1913 in Turin of a heart-failure and was buried in his family's chapel in Cisano sul Neva. In 2010 the Army Training Command of Bangkok, with a solemn ceremony, raised a statue of Gerini at the entrance of its headquarters, the second Italian so honoured in Thailand (the first was Corrado Feroci, Silpa Bhirasri, founder of the Silpakorn University of Bangkok).

== Bibliography ==
- “A retrospective View and Account of the Origin of the Thet Maha Chat Ceremony " 1892
- “Chulakantamangala or The Tonsure Ceremony as Performed in Siam” 1893 (republished many times by different publishers)
- “Trial by Ordeal in Siam and the Siamese Laws of Ordeals " 1896
- “Shan and Siam” and “Siam's Intercourse with China - Seventh to Nineteenth Centuries” 1899
- “On Siamese Proverbs and Idiomatic Expressions “ 1904
- “Archaeology a sinoptical Sketch” 1904
- “Historical Retrospect of Junkceylon Island” 1905, (republished in 1986 by the Siam Society under the title “Old Puket”)
- “Researches on Ptolemy's Geography of Eastern Asia (Further India and Indo-Malay Archipelago)” 1909 (originally published by the Royal Asia Society jointly with the Royal Geographical Society after republished many times by different publishers)
- “Catalogo Descrittivo della Mostra Siamese alla Esposizione Internazionale delle Industrie e del Lavoro in Torino”, 1911 - Siam and Its Productions, Arts and Manufactures (1911), 1912 (published both in Italian and in English, republished in 2000 in Bangkok by White Lotus)
