= Thalang district =

Thalang ถลาง
- District
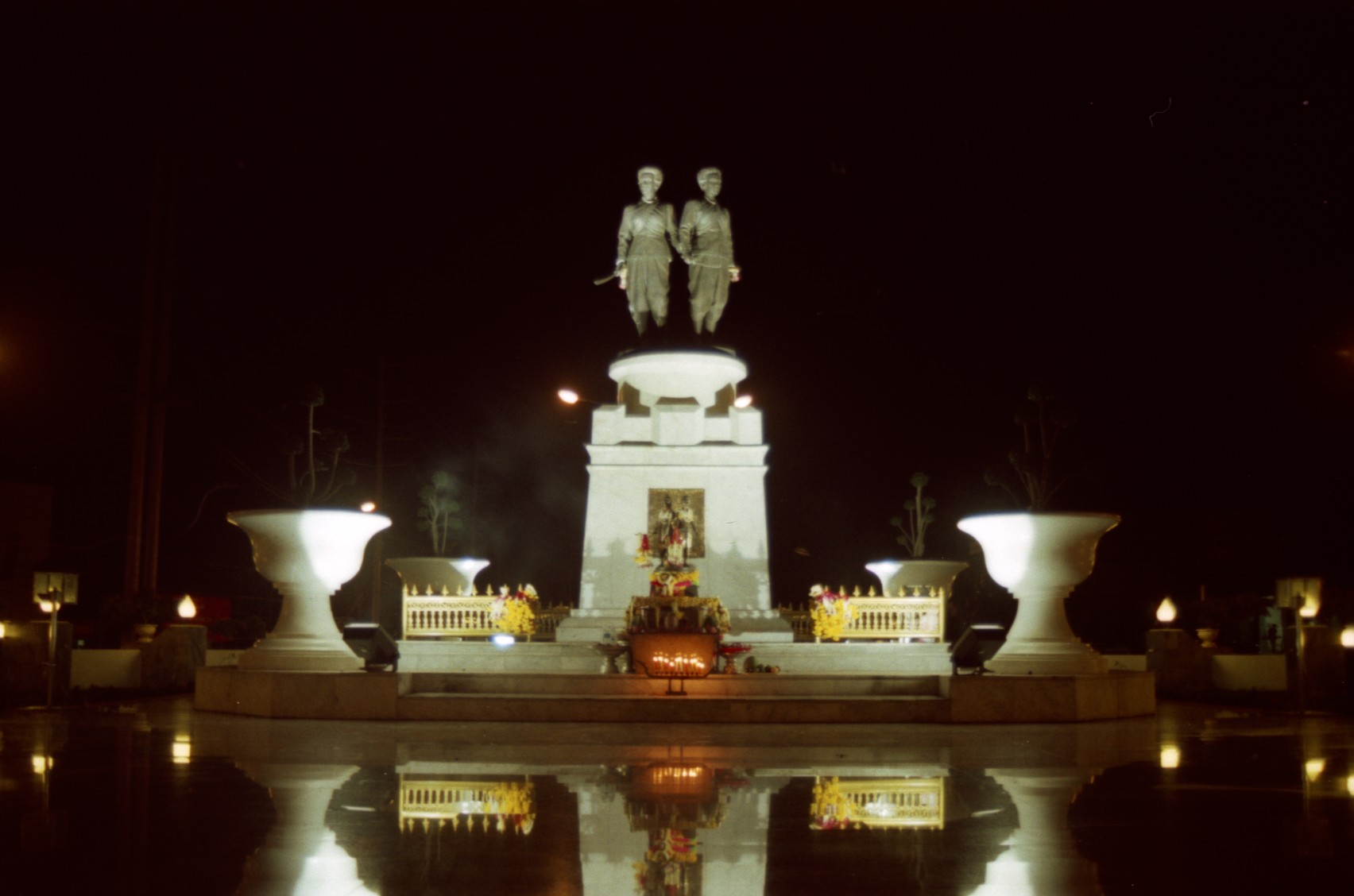
- Memorial of Thao Thep Kasattri and Thao Sri Sunthon

- District location in Phuket province

- Location within Thailand
- Coordinates: 8°1′54″N 98°20′2″E
- Country: Thailand
- Province: Phuket

Area
  - Total: 252.0 km^{2} (97.3 sq mi)

Population (3 October 1993)
  - Total: 75,224
  - Density: 298.5/km^{2} (773/sq mi)
- Time zone: UTC+7 (ICT)
- Postal code: 83110
- Geocode: 8303

Thalang (Thai: ถลาง, pronounced [tʰā.lǎːŋ]); (Malay: Telong or Tanjung Salang (Jawi: تلوڠ / تنجوڠ سالڠ ) is a district (amphoe) in the north of Phuket province, Thailand.

== History ==
Phuket was formerly known as Thalang (ถลาง thalang), derived from the old Malay telong"(Jawi: تلوڠ) which means 'cape'. The northern district of the province, which was the location of the old capital, still uses this name. In 1898 the current district was established.

== Geography ==
Thalang District borders Mueang Phuket and Kathu to the south. To the north is Takua Thung of Phang Nga province, separated by the Pak Prah Strait.

== Places ==
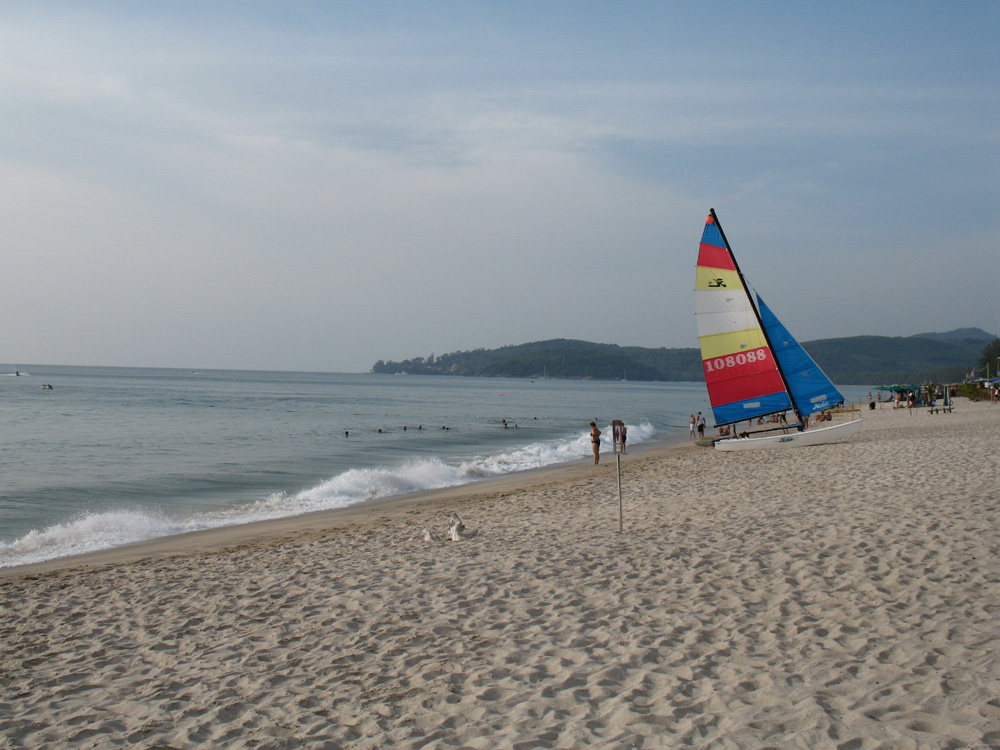
Bang Thao Beach

The Khao Phra Thaeo Non-hunting Area protects more than 20 km^{2} of rainforest in the hills of the district. The three highest peaks of this reserve are the Khao Prathiu (384 m), Khao Bang Pae (388 m) and Khao Phara (422 m). Sirinat National Park on the northwestern coast was established in 1981 and protects an area of 90 km^{2} (68 km^{2} marine area), including Nai Yang Beach where sea turtles lay their eggs.

At the Heroines Monument in the south of the district a branch museum of the National Museum was opened in 1989. The monument itself commemorates the local heroines Thao Thep Kasattri and Thao Sri Sunthon, who forced the Burmese army besieging the town of Thalang to retreat.

== Transport ==
Phuket International Airport is in Thalang District. The main road is Highway 402, which runs from the Sarasin Bridge over the Pak Prah Strait to Phuket city.

== Administration ==
The district is divided into six sub-districts (tambons), which are further subdivided into 46 villages (mubans). Thep Krasattri and Choeng Thale have sub-district municipality (thesaban tambon) status, each covering part of tambons of the same name. Each of the six tambons is administered by a tambon administrative organization (TAO).

No.	Name	Thai name	Villages	Pop.
1.	Thep Krasattri	เทพกระษัตรี	11	18,320
2.	Si Sunthon	ศรีสุนทร	8	14,197
3.	Choeng Thale	เชิงทะเล	6	14,113
4.	Pakhlok	ป่าคลอก	9	12,224
5.	Mai Khao	ไม้ขาว	7	11,874
6.	Sakhu	สาคู	5	4,496

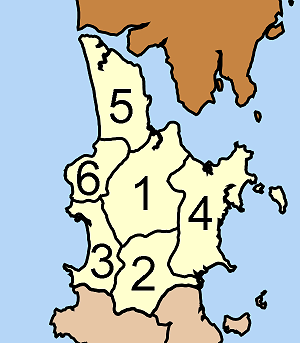
