= Thao Thep Krasattri and Thao Si Sunthon =

18th-century Thai warriors

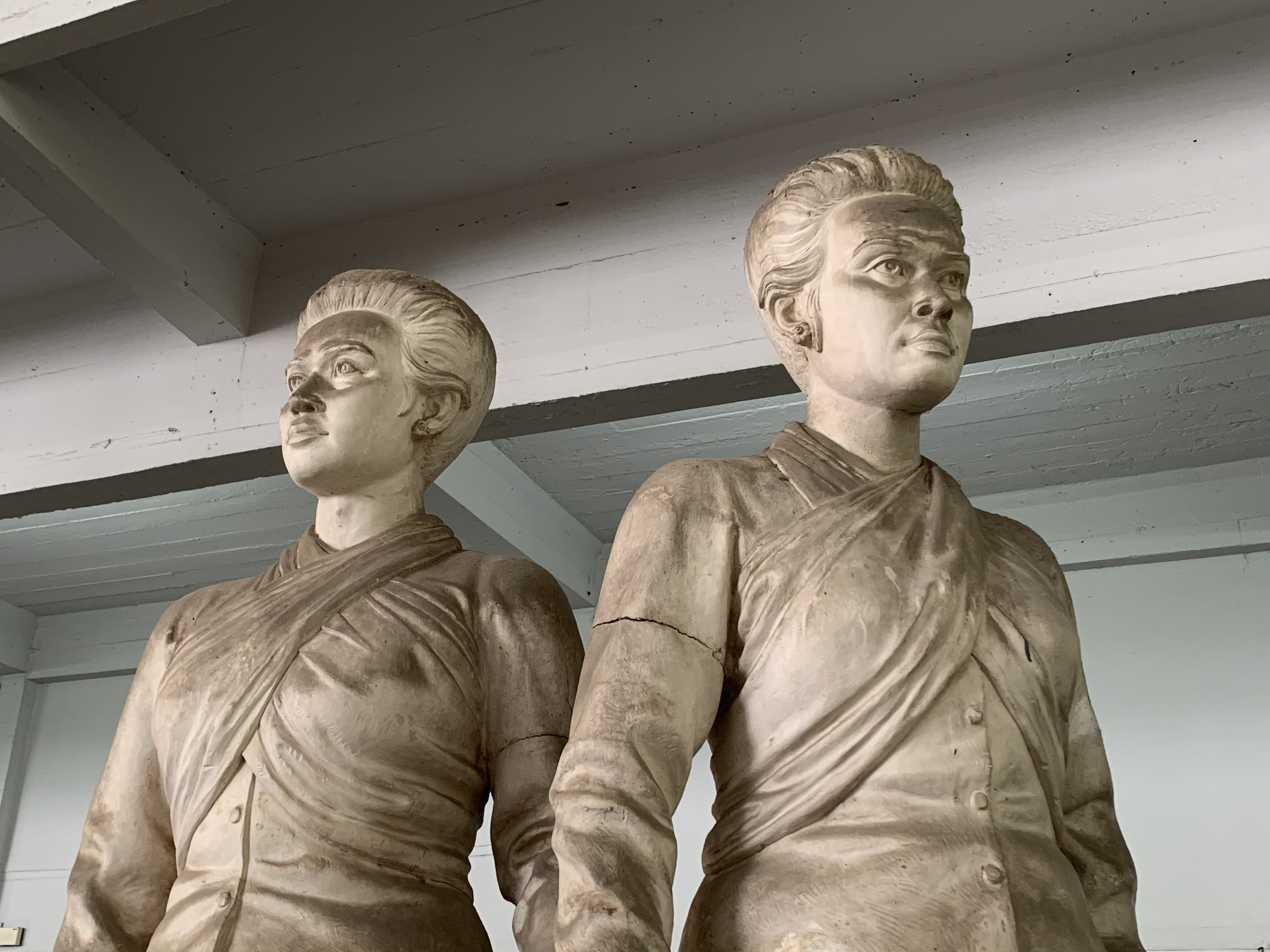
Close-up of Thao Thep Krasattri and Thao Si Sunthon's monument prototype, the built one is in Phuket

Thao Thep Krasattri (ท้าวเทพกระษัตรี 1735 – 1792) and Thao Si Sunthon (ท้าวศรีสุนทร), formerly Khun Ying Chan (คุณหญิงจัน) and Khun Ying Muk (คุณหญิงมุก), respectively, are Thai national heroines who were known for their important roles in successfully repelling the Burmese Invasion of Thalang (modern Phuket) in 1786.

== Early life ==
Khun Ying Chan, or Lady Chan, was born around 1735 and her younger sister Lady Muk was born around 1737 on Thalang (Phuket) Island during the reign of King Borommokot of Ayutthaya (r. 1733 – 1758). Their father was Chom Rang the local leader of Thalang Baan Khien. Their mother was a Malay woman by the name of Masia. Masia, according to the Thalang Chronicles composed in 1914, claimed descent from "Marhum" or a Sultan of Kedah. Masia moved from Kedah to Thalang where she met Chom Rang the local leader and married him. Three daughters and two sons were born from the union including Lady Chan and Lady Muk.

In the 18th century, there were two major settlements on Phuket Island; Thalang Baan Khien and Thalang Baan Don. Thalang Baan Khien was ruled by Chom Rang and Thalang Baan Don was ruled by Chom Thau. Chom Rang and Chom Thau were half-brothers who shared the same father but different mothers.

Lady Chan first married to Muen Si Phakdi, a minor local official. With him she had a daughter, Lady Prang, and a son, Thien. After Muen Si Phakdi had died, Lady Chan was remarried to Phra Phimol, the governor of Kraburi. With him she had another three daughters and two sons.

== Thonburi period ==
After the Fall of Ayutthaya in 1767, Thalang came under the regime of Chao Phraya Nakhon Nu, who established himself as the ruler of Southern Thailand based on Nakhon Si Thammarat. King Taksin of Thonburi defeated Chao Phraya Nakhon Nu in 1769 and shortly after Phra Phimol, husband of Lady Chan, was made the governor of Thalang. Thongphun, a cousin of Lady Chan (who was the son of Chom Thau) was made the vice-governor of Thalang. Francis Light, a British merchant, arrived to settle at Thalang in 1772 and became a close family friend to Lady Chan and Phra Phimol.

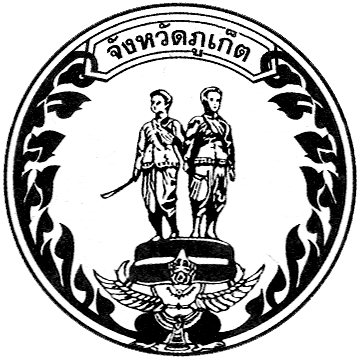
The Seal of modern Phuket Province showing Lady Chan and Lady Mook.

In 1782, at the end of Thonburi Period, the new Bangkok court sent Phraya Thammatrailok as the new governor of Takua Pa and the surrounding vicinities. In 1785, during the Burmese–Siamese War of 1785–1786 or the Nine Armies' War, Phraya Thammatrailok ordered Lady Chan arrested for an unknown accusation for trial at Pak Phra. When Lady Chan had been taken to Pak Phra, the Burmese general Wungyi led a Burmese force of 3,000 men to attack Takua Pa. The Burmese took Takua Pa and Pak Phra and Phraya Thammatrailok was killed in battle. Lady Chan then, amidst confusion, returned to Thalang where she received warning from Francis Light about the imminent Burmese Invasion of Thalang.

== Rattanakosin period ==
Phra Phimol, who had been gravely ill, died in December 1785. This left Thalang without a governor. The widowed Lady Chan and her sister Lady Muk, together with her son Thien and her cousin Thongpun the vice-governor, organized the local defense against the Burmese invasion. They established themselves at Phra Nang Sang Temple and Thung Nang Dak and managed to be armed with two great canons. Francis Light also supported the Thalang defenders with arquebuses. The Burmese general Wungyi led the assault on the island. The defenders relied on their heavy canons to ward off the Burmese invaders. After about one month of continuous fighting, the Burmese finally retreated on March 13, 1786.

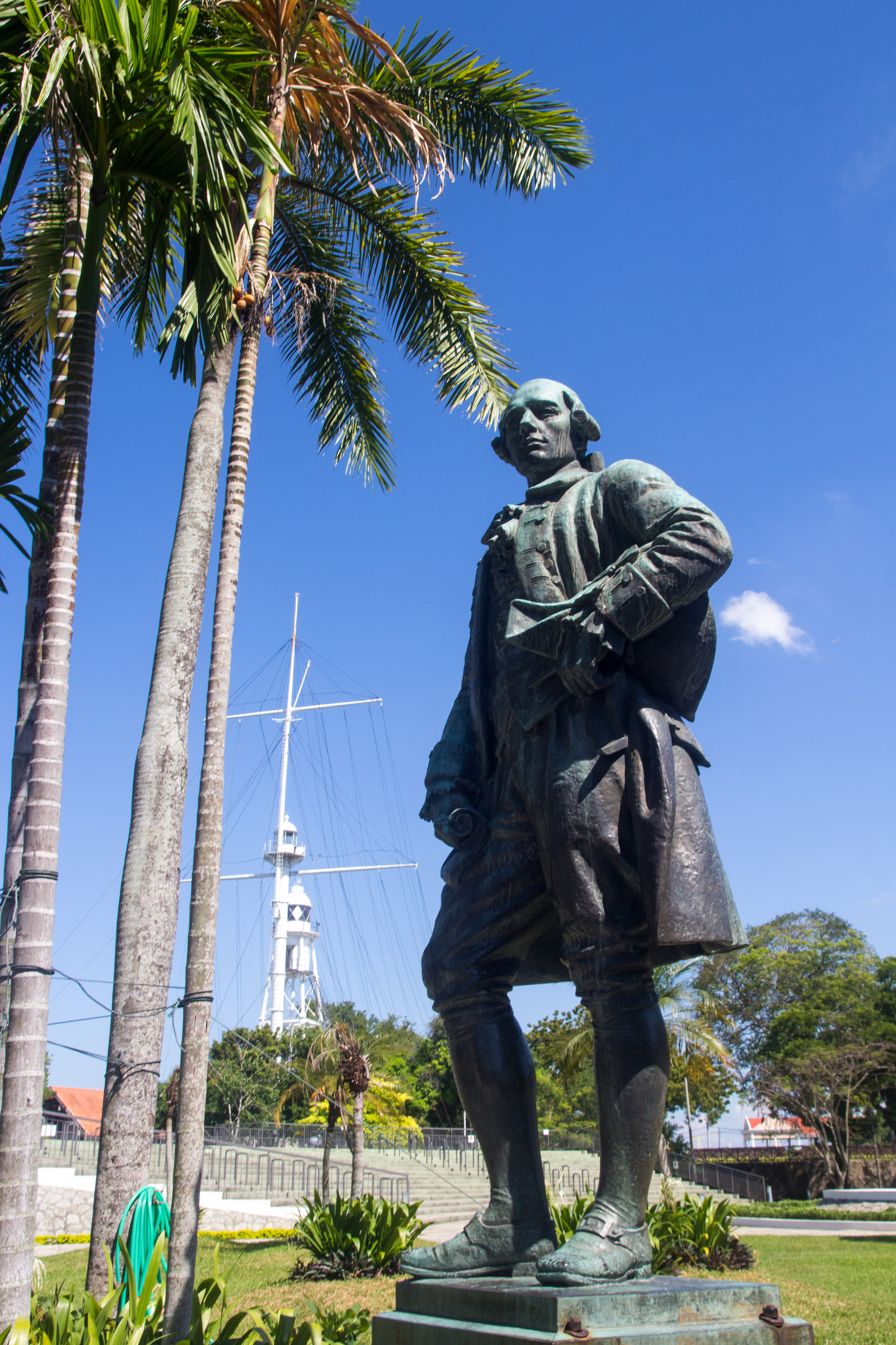
Francis Light was a close family friend to Lady Chan, to whom her family wrote six letters from 1785 to 1792.

Francis Light left Thalang for Penang Island in 1786, Even after this, Francis Light and the family of Lady Chan maintained contacts through written letters. After the war, King Rama I appointed Chao Phraya Surinthraracha as the superintendent of the Andaman Coast and tin mining. Chao Phraya Surinthraracha brought the royal orders to reward Lady Chan and Lady Muk with the honorific title of Thao, as Thao Thep Krasattri and Thao Si Sunthon, for their contributions to the successful defence of Thalang against the Burmese invaders. Thongpun was made the new governor of Thalang, while Thien, son of Lady Chan, was made Phraya Tukkaraj the vice-governor of Thalang.

Lady Chan and her family struggled to earn a living through tin mining. Lady Prang, daughter of Lady Chan, wrote to Francis Light in 1788 that her family was in the hardships. Thongpun and Thien then engaged in political conflicts. Lady Chan and her family traveled to Bangkok in 1788, where her son Nien became a royal page and her daughter Thong became a minor consort to King Rama I. Thien managed to file an accusation against Thongpun the governor of Thalang to the Bangkok court. Thongpun was then arrested and brought for trial at Bangkok where he died. Thien was made the new governor of Thalang. Consort Thong, daughter of Lady Chan, born Princess Ubol in 1791.

In 1792, Phraya Thalang Thien the governor of Thalang wrote a letter to Francis Light, stating that his mother Lady Chan had been old and ill and that his sister Lady Prang had already died. Lady Chan died in 1792. It is not known when Lady Muk died. Lady Chan's son, Phraya Thalang Thien, continued to govern Thalang until 1809 when the Burmese invaded again. Thalang fell to the Burmese in 1810 and was completely destroyed and Thien was taken as captive to Burma.

The "Heroine's Monument" honouring them is situated on the main highway (402) between the Phuket International Airport and Phuket town.

== See also ==
- Francis Light
- History of Phuket
- Burmese–Siamese War (1785–86)
- Burmese–Siamese wars
