= Tha Din Daeng campaign =

1786 battle during the Burmese–Siamese War (1785–86)

- Part of the Burmese–Siamese War (1785–1786)
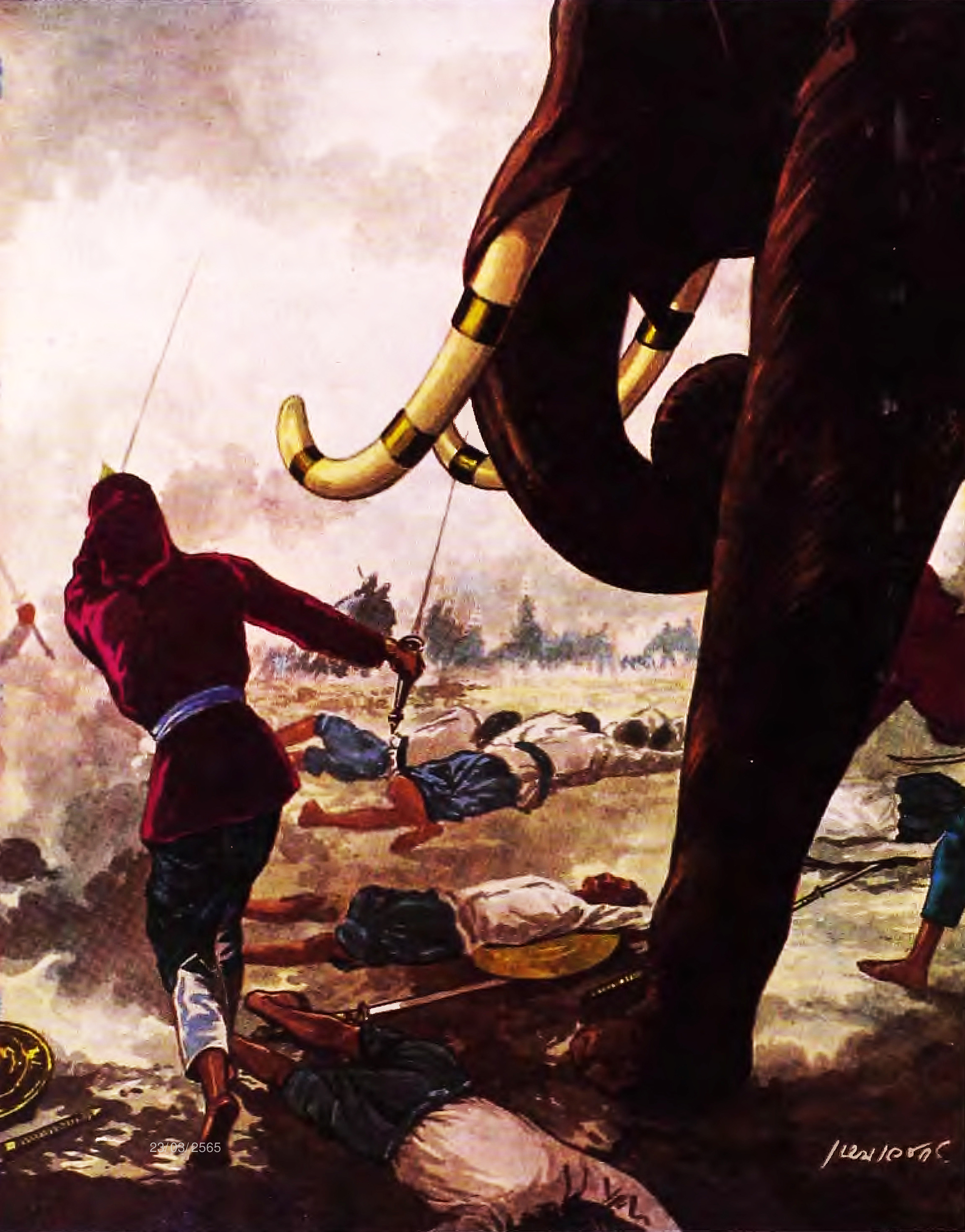
- Battle in the Tha Din Daeng campaign, illustrated by Hem Vejakorn (c. 1969)
| Date | 1786 |
| Location | Tha Din Daeng, Kanchanaburi Province, western Thailand |
| Result | Siamese victory |

Belligerents
| Konbaung dynasty (Burma) | Rattanakosin Kingdom (Siam) |

Commanders and leaders
| Bodawpaya; Thado Minsaw | Rama I Maha Sura Singhanat |

Strength
| 36,000 | 30,000 |

The Tha Din Daeng campaign (Thai: สงครามท่าดินแดง, RTGS: Songkhram Tha Din Daeng, literally "Tha Din Daeng War") was a short military campaign that took place in 1786 at Tha Din Daeng in present-day Sangkhla Buri District, Kanchanaburi Province in western Thailand. The conflict occurred during the Burmese–Siamese War (1785–1786), and was fought between the Burmese forces of King Bodawpaya of the Konbaung dynasty and Siamese forces commanded by King Rama I of the Rattanakosin Kingdom, together with his brother Maha Sura Singhanat. The campaign represented Burma's renewed attempt to invade Siam following its defeat during the Nine Armies War, but the Siamese victory at Tha Din Daeng halted the advance and secured Siam's western frontier against further incursions.

== Military Campaigns ==
=== Prelude ===
After many defeats in early 1786, King Bodawpaya retreated to Martaban. However, he retained some of his forces on the Tenasserim Coast waiting for the new campaigns. The traditional wars were usually conducted in dry season as the lands in the rainy season were swampy and ravaged with disease, making it unsuitable for marching and encampment. King Bodawpaya ordered the Burmese forces at Tavoy to retreat to Martaban under the command of Minhla Sithu, while Maha Thiri Thihathu was ordered to retreat from Mergui to Tavoy. The king then marched back to Dagon where he worshipped the famous Shwedagon Pagoda and returned to Ava. The Burmese armies stationed at Martaban and Tavoy, waiting for the rainy season to be over to conduct new invasions of Siam.

In September 1786, King Bodawpaya resumed his Siamese campaigns. He sent his eldest son and heir, Prince Thado Minsaw or Prince Nanda Kyawdin (known in Thai sources as Einshe Min Uparaja) to Martaban to organize the new invasion of Siam.

=== Preparations ===
Prince Nanda Kyawdin or Einshe Min Uparaja took the lead of the army of 50,000 men at Martaban, with Wundauk Nemyo Kyawzwa as his Sitke. King Bodawpaya made sure that the provision shortage would not hinder the campaign again. He ordered the grain rations of Arakan and the whole Lower Burma to be sent to the frontlines. The Burmese also established strong supply lines with supply outposts stationed all along the way from Martaban to Kanchanaburi. Unlike the previous invasion, the Burmese concentrate the forces in single direction at Kanchanaburi instead of dispersing the forces in many directions. Prince Nanda Kyawdin sent Minhla Sithu, the Burmese veteran who had been defeated by the Siamese at the Battle of Latya seven months earlier, to lead the vanguard of 30,000 ahead into Kanchanaburi.

After King Rama I and Prince Maha Sura Singhanat (the Front Palace) received news of the Burmese advance, they ordered the mobilization of forces in Bangkok and the provincial towns. In late February 1786, they departed Bangkok by river with the royal flotilla, accompanied by the vessels of senior nobles and officials in full formation. The vanguard was placed under Prince Maha Sura Singhanat and Chao Phraya Rattanapiphit (acting Samuhanayok), consisting of about 30,000 troops drawn from the Grand Palace and the Front Palace, and was sent ahead. The main royal army followed with the Rear Palace and other princes, providing a further reinforcement of slightly over 30,000 men. Phraya Phonlaphop was ordered to remain in Bangkok to oversee the defense of the capital.

When the Siamese vanguard reached Sai Yok, the Front Palace commander ordered the forces of Chao Phraya Rattanaphiphit, together with the armies of Phraya Kalahom Ratchasena, Phraya Cha Saenyakon, and provincial levies—amounting to roughly 20,000 men—to disembark and advance overland with elephants, cavalry, and infantry forming the forward column. A reserve force of about 10,000 men followed under the command of the Prince Anurak Devesh (the Rear Palace). Upon reaching Tha Khanun, the main royal army left the flotilla and proceeded by land to support the reserve column.

The vanguard reached the Burmese encampment at Samsop and established several forward camps to encircle it. The Rear Palace's reserve then set up a royal camp roughly two kilometres behind the vanguard, while the main royal force established another camp about 2.8 kilometres further to the rear.

=== The battle ===
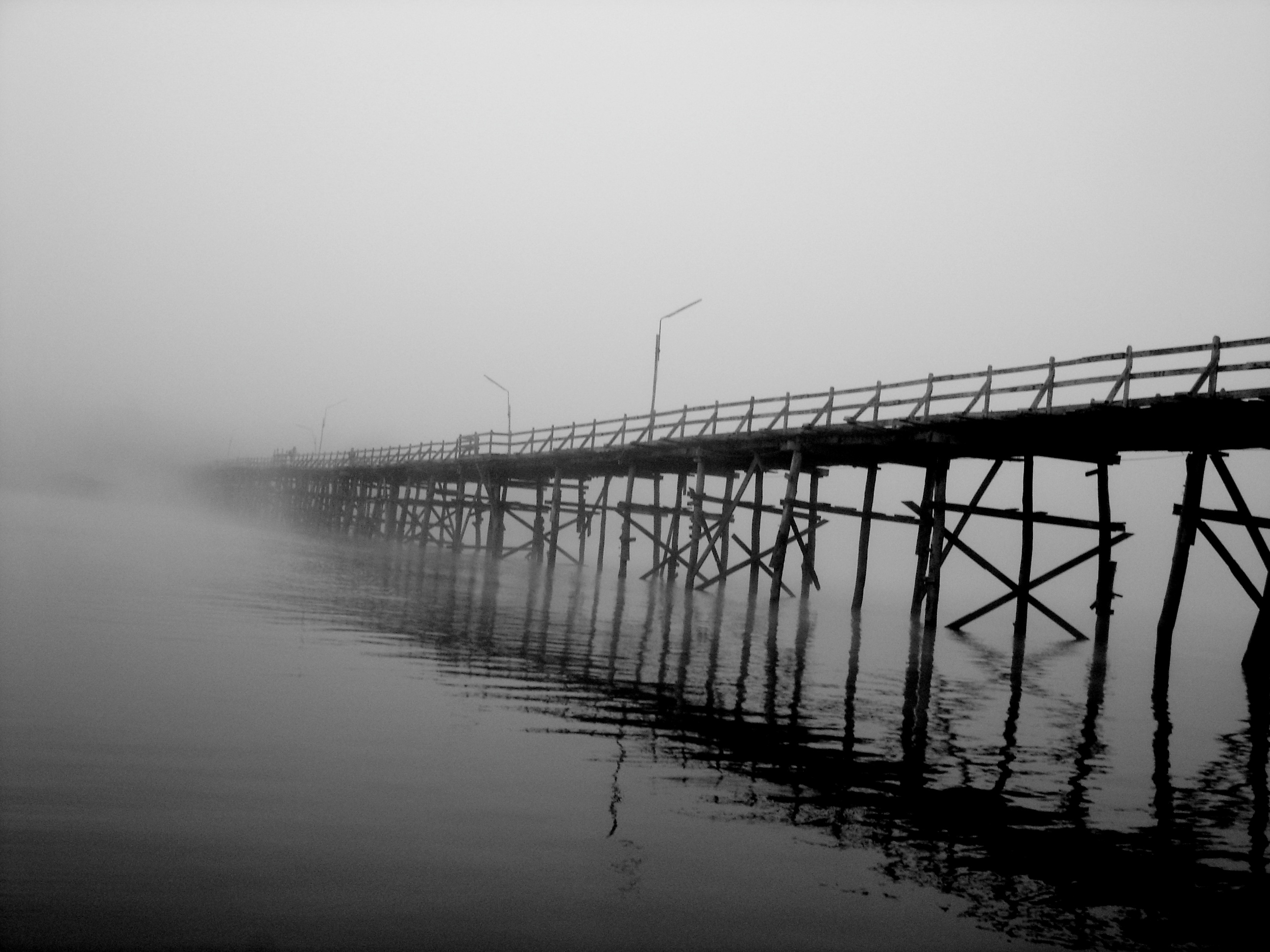
The "Mon Wooden Bridge" in Sangkhla Buri District, Kanchanaburi Province was the site of Samsop, one of the battle sites of Tha Din Daeng campaign.

The Burmese army entered Kanchanaburi via the Three Pagodas Pass (Payathonzu). Minhla Sithu divided his forces, establishing encampments at Tha Din Daeng and Samsop—both in what is now Sangkhlaburi—while Prince Nanda Kyawdin remained at the pass to secure communications and the line of retreat.

On February 1, 1787, Prince Maha Sura Singhanat led an army of 30,000 men from Bangkok by river to Sai Yok. Upon his arrival, he commanded Phraya Kalahom Ratchasena, Phraya Chasaenyakon, and Chao Phraya Rattanaphiphit (Son) to lead a vanguard of 20,000 men to advance and confront the Burmese forces at Samsop. The strategic objective was to decisively defeat the Burmese army at the border, preventing them from penetrating deeper into the territory as they had in previous invasions. The vanguard commanders established their camp at Samsop, while Prince Maha Sura Singhanat's main army encamped approximately 2 kilometers behind them.

King Rama I subsequently led the royal army by river to Sai Yok, disembarked, and established his camp approximately 2.8 kilometers behind the Front Palace's army. He then ordered his commanders to deploy their forces and position themselves in close proximity to the Burmese army at Tha Din Daeng.

On February 21, 1787, the Thai forces launched a simultaneous attack on the Burmese positions at both Tha Din Daeng and Samsop. The battle raged day and night, characterized by heavy artillery exchanges. After approximately three days of fighting, on February 23, the Burmese forces were routed and forced to retreat.

Upon learning of the defeat and retreat of his vanguards—commanded by the Myanwun and Myanmewun—the Burmese Crown Prince ordered his main army to fall back to Martaban. The Thai forces pursued the retreating troops, inflicting heavy casualties, and advanced as far as the Mae Kasat River, the site of the Crown Prince's encampment. King Rama I then ordered the complete destruction of the Burmese granaries and supply depots before leading his army back to the capital.

== Aftermath ==
According to the contemporary account of Vincenzo Sangermano, a Catholic missionary residing in Burma at the time, news of Bodawpaya's defeat and withdrawal spread rapidly in the Burmese capital, provoking anxiety at court and among the populace, where fears arose that a continued Siamese pursuit might threaten Amarapura itself. A later interpretation by Sir Arthur Purves Phayre offers a contrasting perspective from Siam: Phayre eulogises King Phutthayotfa Chulalok (Rama I) as the ruler who rallied a population long cowed by Burma, restoring their confidence in the aftermath of the victory.

== Legacy ==
Cover of Royal Writings of King Rama I, which includes Nirat Tha Dindaeng, a royal poem on the war against Burma (1786).

The Tha Din Daeng campaign also entered Thai literary memory. King Phutthayotfa Chulalok (Rama I) is credited with composing Nirat Tha Din Daeng (also known as Khlon Phleng Yao Rueang Rop Phama Thi Tha Din Daeng), a long nirat poem written during the 1786 march to the western frontier. In the conventional nirat mode, it mixes personal yearning with a travel narrative of the army's route, before ending with an account of the fighting at Tha Din Daeng.

The campaign is commemorated by a park established by the Royal Thai Army about 40 kilometres (25 mi) from the town of Kanchanaburi.

== See also ==
- Burmese–Siamese War (1785–1786)
- Burmese–Siamese wars
- Burma–Thailand relations
