= Maha Sura Singhanat =

Siamese prince (1744–1803)

Maha Sura Singhanat; มหาสุรสิงหนาท
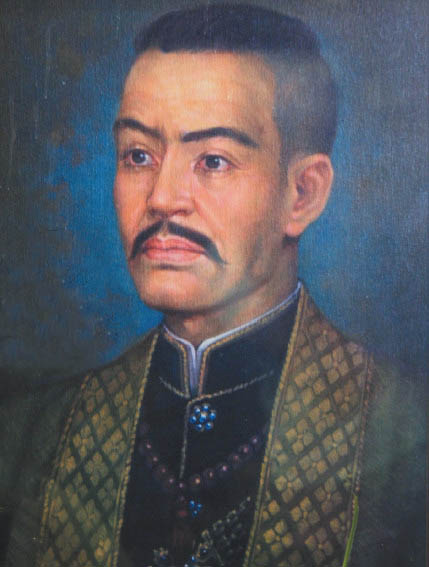
- Portrait at Wat Chana Songkhram

Viceroy of Rattanakosin
- Tenure: 1782 – 3 November 1803
- Appointer: Phutthayotfa Chulalok (Rama I)
- Predecessor: Inthraphithak (as Viceroy of Thonburi)
- Successor: Itsarasunthon (later Rama II)
- Deputy Viceroy: Anurak Devesh
- Born: 1 November 1744; Ayutthaya, Ayutthaya
- Died: 3 November 1803 (aged 59); Bangkok, Siam
- Spouses: Sri Anocha; Ang Pou; Ang E; Ang Mey; Various consorts
- Issue: 43 sons and daughters
- Dynasty: Chakri
- Father: Thongdi (later Somdet Phra Pathom Borom Maha Chanok)
- Mother: Daoreung (Yok; later Phra Akkhara Chaya)
- Religion: Theravada Buddhism

Prince Maha Sura Singhanat (Thai: สมเด็จพระบวรราชเจ้ามหาสุรสิงหนาท, RTGS: Somdet Phra Boworaratchao Maha Surasinghanat; 1 November 1744 – 3 November 1803), born Bunma (Thai: บุญมา), was a Siamese military leader and statesman who served as the first Front Palace of the Chakri Dynasty. As the younger brother of King Rama I, he was a foundational figure in the establishment of the Rattanakosin Kingdom and played a decisive role in securing Siam's independence from Burmese incursions during the late 18th century.

Rising to prominence during the Thonburi Kingdom under King Taksin, he held the title of Chao Phraya Surasi and became renowned for his fierce and tactical combat style, earning the moniker "Phraya Suea" (The Tiger Lord). Following the accession of Rama I in 1782, he was appointed the Viceroy and took up residence in the newly constructed Front Palace, where he oversaw the defense and administration of the northern provinces.

His military career is defined by several critical victories that ensured the survival of the nascent Chakri state. Most notably, he led the Siamese defense in the Nine Armies' War (1785), where his strategic maneuver at the Battle of Lat Ya effectively repelled a massive Burmese invasion. He further solidified Siamese dominance through the Tha Din Daeng campaign (1786), the capture of Tavoy (1787), and the liberation of Chiang Mai from Burmese control (1795–1802).

Beyond his martial achievements, Maha Sura Singhanat was a patron of the arts and religion. He oversaw the restoration of numerous temples, including Wat Mahathat Yuwaratrangsarit, and authored several literary works that provide significant historical and emotional insight into the transitional period between the fall of Ayutthaya and the rise of Bangkok.

== Early life ==
Bunma was born in 1744 to Thongdi and Daoreung. His father Thongdee was the Royal Secretary of Northern Siam and Keeper of Royal Seal. As a son of aristocrat, he entered the palace and began his aristocratic life as a royal page. Thongdee was a descendant of Kosa Pan, the leader of Siamese mission to France in the seventeenth century. Bunma had four other siblings and two other half-siblings. Bunma himself was the youngest born to Daoreung.

When he came of age, he entered royal service as a mahadlek (royal page) in the Ayutthaya court.

== Military and political career ==
=== Thonburi period ===
Following the fall of Ayutthaya in 1767, Bunma (later Maha Sura Singhanat) joined the forces of Phraya Tak and took part in the campaigns to seize Chanthaburi and to drive Burmese forces from Thonburi. During the Thonburi period, he emerged as one of Taksin's primary military leaders; he also brought his elder brother Thongduang (later Rama I) into the king's inner circle, and the two became Taksin's most successful generals. Bunma initially held the office of Phra Maha Montri (Chief of the Royal Police Department) and subsequently rose through the ranks, attaining the titles of Phraya Anuchit Racha and Phraya Yommarat, respectively.

In 1770, during King Taksin's expedition to suppress the Chao Phra Fang rebellion, Bunma was commanded to lead a land force northward in advance of the main royal army. After the successful campaign, Phraya Yommarat was elevated to the rank of Chao Phraya Surasi Phitsanuwathirat, the governor of Phitsanulok. From then on, he was entrusted with the defense of the kingdom's northern frontiers, where Siamese counter-offensives gradually reduced Burmese pressure. His leadership was instrumental in rolling back Burmese influence in Lanna, leading to the re-establishment of Chiang Mai under Siamese suzerainty in cooperation with the local ruler Kawila of Lampang. His formidable reputation and military authority became so widely renowned during this period that he earned the epithet "Phraya Suea" (The Tiger Lord).

These wars also intersected with Bangkok's eastward expansion. The Thonburi regime's tensions with the Lao states culminated in the Thai campaign of 1778–1779, which resulted in the conquest of Vientiane; contemporary accounts of the aftermath place the conquering general, Chao Phraya Surasi, in a supervisory role over Lao captives brought to the capital area.

=== Rattanakosin period ===
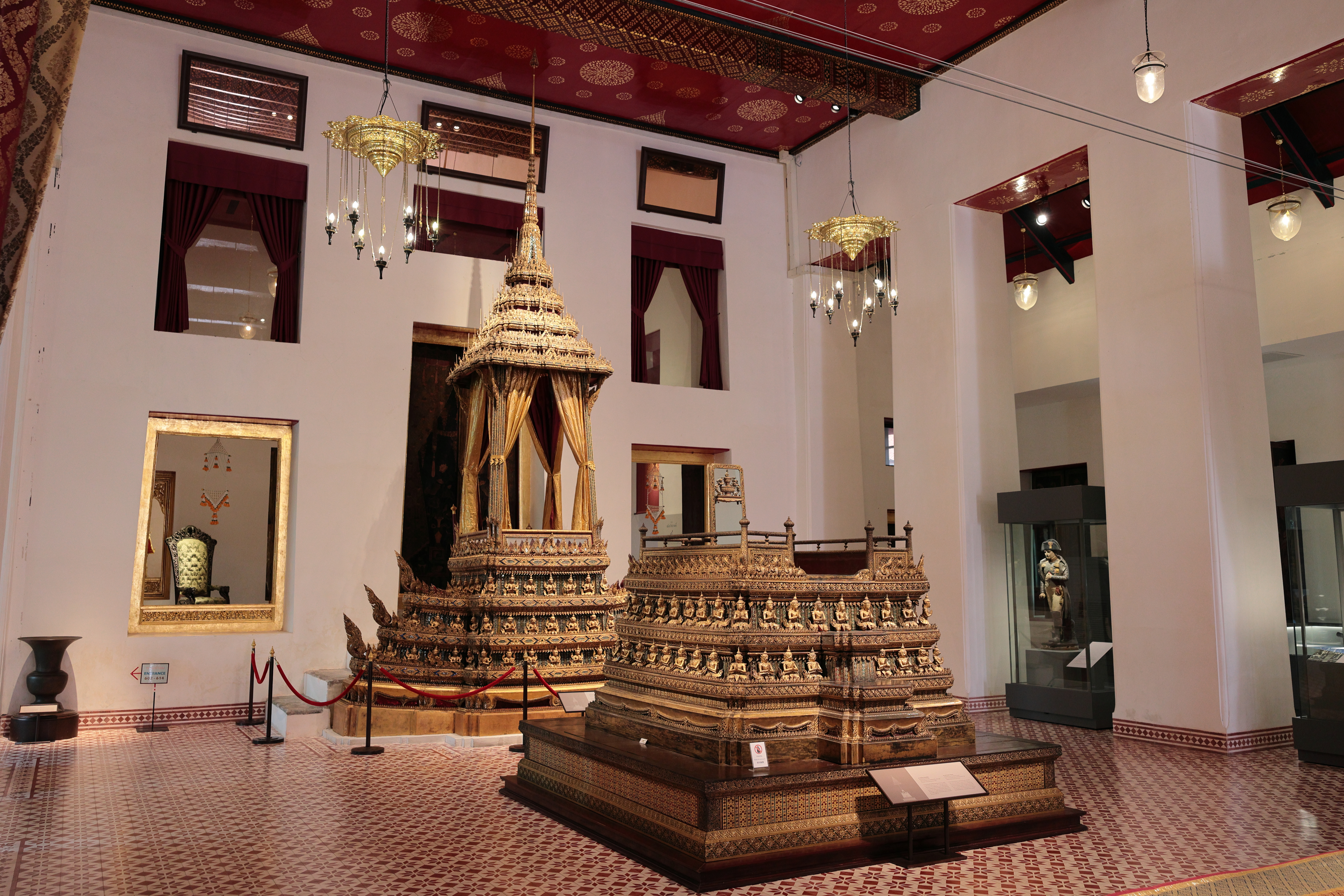
Interior of Phra Thinang Isara Winitchai, the principal throne hall of the Front Palace (Wang Na), commissioned by Maha Sura Singhanat during the early Rattanakosin period.

In April 1782, a coup ended Taksin's reign and Thongduang ascended the throne as King Rama I. Bunma was appointed Somdet Phra Baworn Racha Chao (the Front Palace/uparat) and took up residence at the Front Palace complex, established to the north of the Grand Palace.

During the Nine Armies War of 1785, King Bodawpaya of the Konbaung Dynasty launched a large-scale invasion of Siam. Maha Sura Singhanat served as the primary field commander at the Battle of Lat Ya in Kanchanaburi, a pivotal engagement where he faced significantly superior numbers. He successfully repelled the invasion by employing psychological tactics and strategic harassment of Burmese supply lines, ultimately forcing a retreat. In 1786, he led a southern expedition to expel Burmese forces from the Malay Peninsula provinces; this campaign inspired his literary work, Phleng Yao Rop Phama thi Nakhon Si Thammarat. Later that same year, he commanded Siamese forces to another victory during the Tha Din Daeng campaign.

In 1802, when Burmese forces again threatened Lan Na and Chiang Mai, Maha Sura Singhanat marched north alongside Prince Thepharirak to assist Prince Kawila. However, he fell ill with gallstones upon reaching Thoen (in modern-day Lampang Province). Consequently, Rama I ordered the Rear Palace (Prince Anurak Devesh) to proceed to the front and assume command. The Siamese forces ultimately achieved a decisive victory, securing the northern frontier.

== Literary works ==
Aside from his military service, Maha Sura Singhanat was a distinguished poet whose works often reflected the grit and emotional depth of his wartime experiences. His literary style is noted for its directness and patriotic fervor. His notable works include:

- Phleng Yao Rop Phama thi Nakhon Si Thammarat (1786) – Composed during the campaign to expel Burmese forces from the southern provinces, this work provides a vivid account of the hardships of war and his devotion to the kingdom.
- Phleng Yao Rueang Ti Mueang Phama (1787) – Also known as Nirat Pai Ti Mueang Thawai, it was written during the expedition to capture Tavoy.
- Phleng Yao Thawai Phayakon (1789) – Composed following a lightning strike at the Indra Bhisek Maha Prasad Throne Hall in the Grand Palace; the poem interprets the event as a significant omen.
- Phleng Yao Somphote Phra Phuttha Sihing (1795) – A celebratory poem written on the occasion of the enshrinement of the Phra Phuttha Sihing image at the Phutthaisawan Chapel in the Front Palace.

== Death ==
Maha Sura Singhanat passed away on 3 November 1803. His remains were placed in a gold-plated dodecagonal royal urn (Phra Kot Mai Sip Song). The royal cremation ceremony was subsequently held at the Phra Merumat (Royal Crematorium) in Sanam Luang.

=== Legend of the "Wang Na curse" ===
Later tradition claims that, while gravely ill, Maha Sura Singhanat asked to be carried around the Front Palace (Wang Na) and uttered a curse that anyone who later possessed the palace without being his descendants would not find happiness. The saying was later remembered in Thai popular writing as the so-called "Wang Na curse" (คำสาปวังหน้า).

== Issue ==
Maha Sura Singhanat had a total of 43 children. His eldest daughter was Princess Phikunthong (later the Princess Srisunthon), who was born to Sri Anocha, the sister of King Kawila of Chiang Mai.

He is the progenitor of the following royal houses (surnames):

- Asuni (ราชสกุลอสุนี)
- Sangkhatat (ราชสกุลสังขทัต)
- Patamasingh (ราชสกุลปัทมสิงห์)
- Neerasingh (ราชสกุลนีรสิงห์)

== In memoriam ==
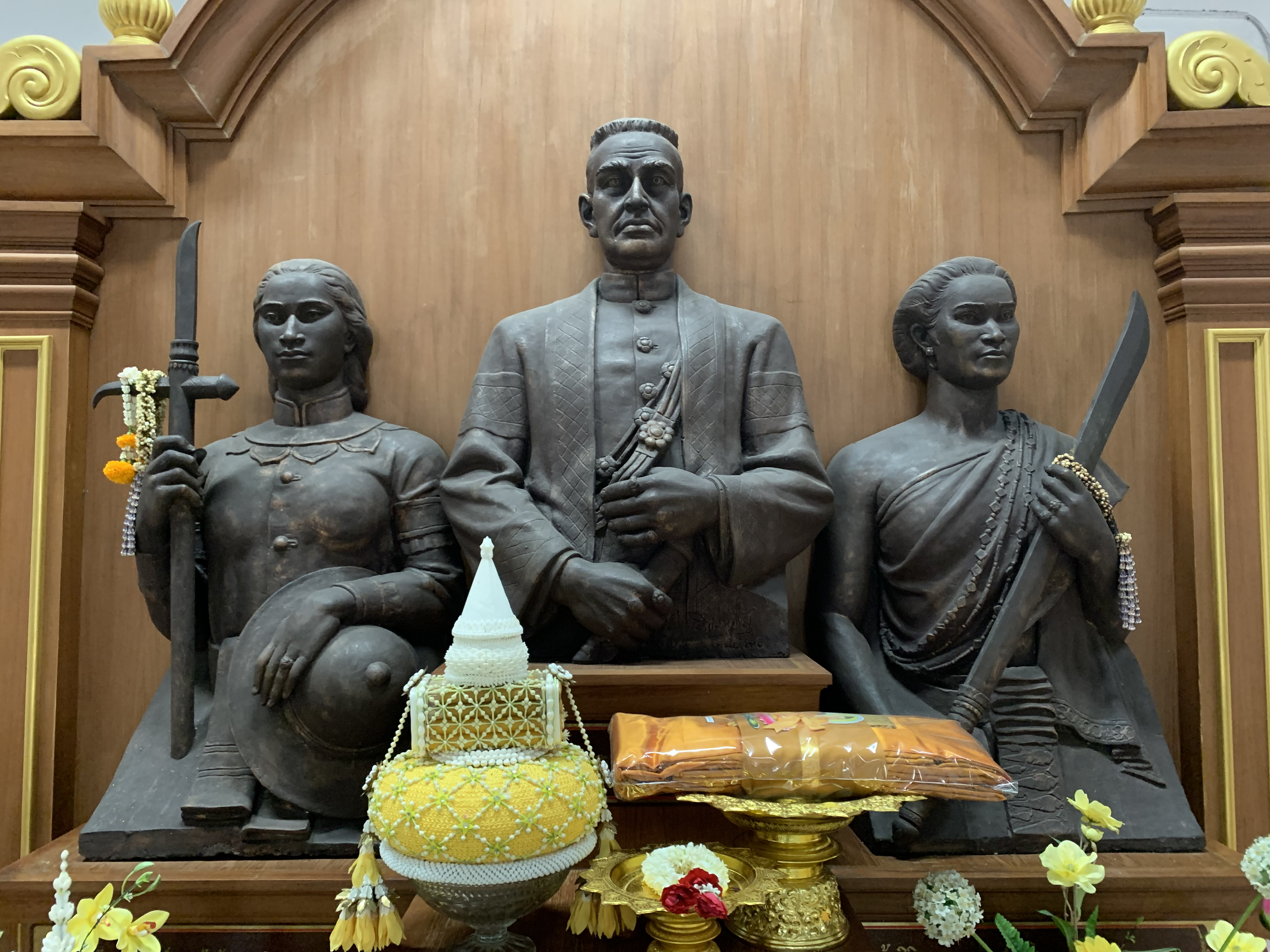
Statues at the multipurpose pavilion of Wat Mahathat Yuwaratrangsarit, Bangkok, depicting (from left to right): Princess Phikunthong, Maha Sura Singhanat, and Sri Anocha.

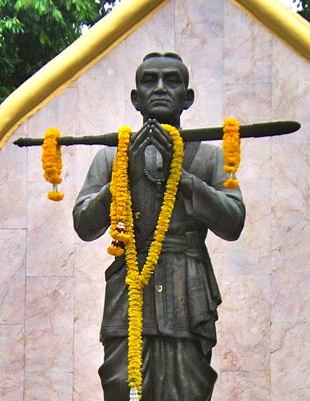
Statue of Maha Sura Singhanat at Wat Mahathat Yuwaratrangsarit

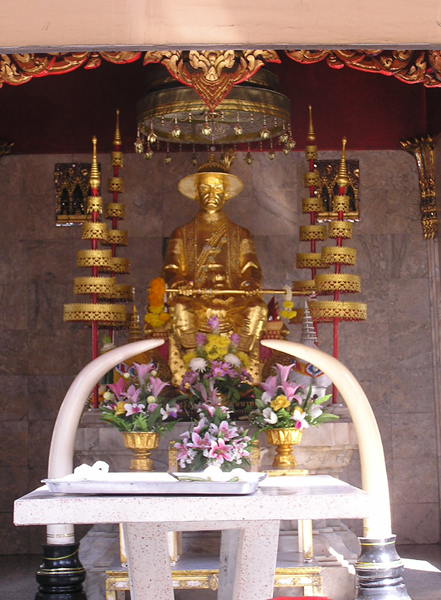
Monument of Prince Maha Sura Singhanat of the Front Palace

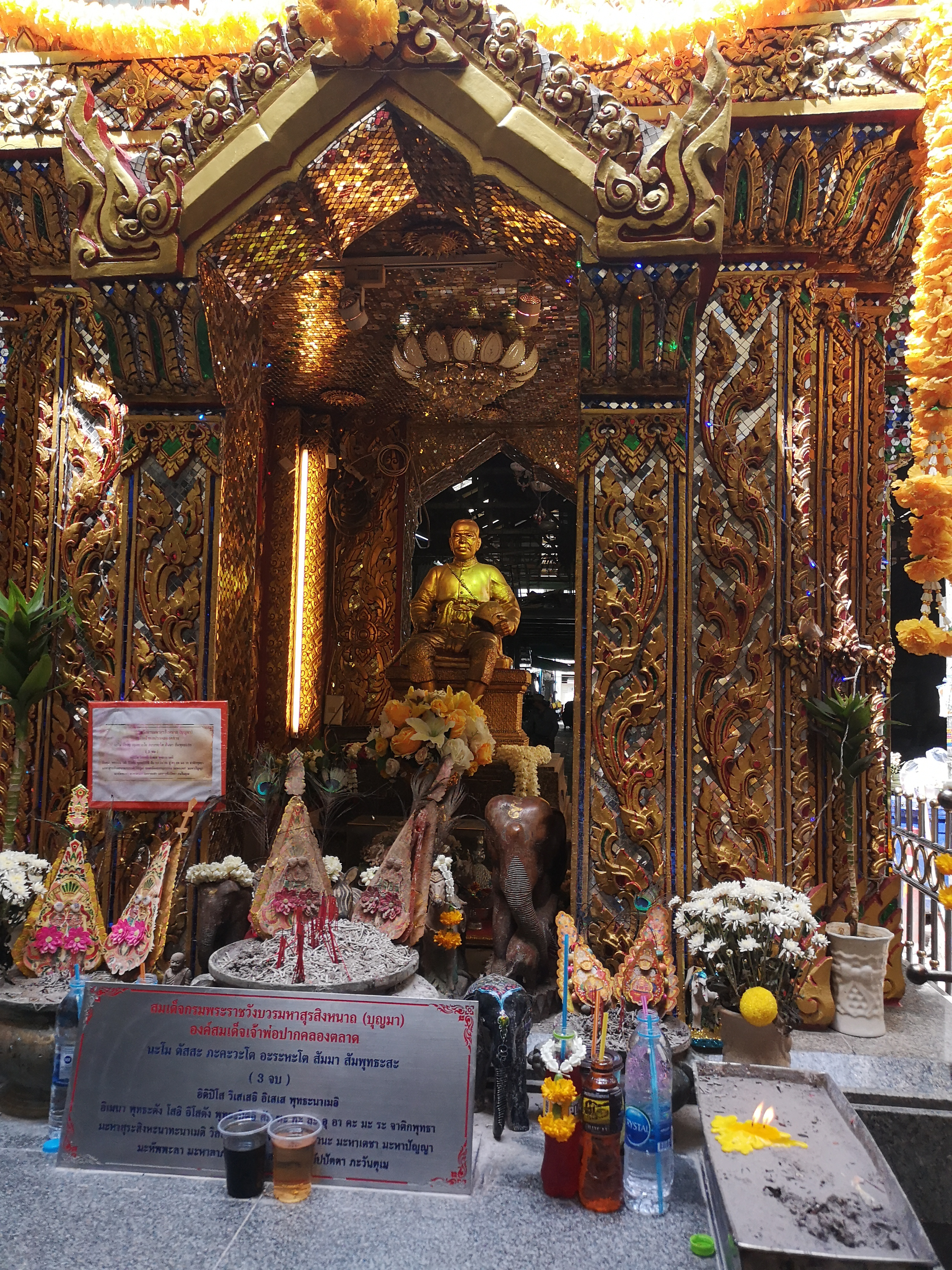
Monument of Maha Sura Singhanat at Pak Khlong Talat

Maha Sura Singhanat House of Chakri Born: 1 November 1744 Died: 3 November 1803
Regnal titles
Preceded by Inthraphithak of Thonburi Kingdom	Viceroy of Rattanakosin; 1782 – 3 November 1803	Vacant Title next held by Itsarasunthon
