= Rama I =

King of Siam from 1782 to 1809

Phutthayotfa Chulalok; พุทธยอดฟ้าจุฬาโลก
- King of Ayutthaya (Note: Thai monarchs continued to refer to themselves as Kings of Ayutthaya long after the city's fall, until the reign of Mongkut, who adopted the title King of Siam in official treaties.); King Rama I
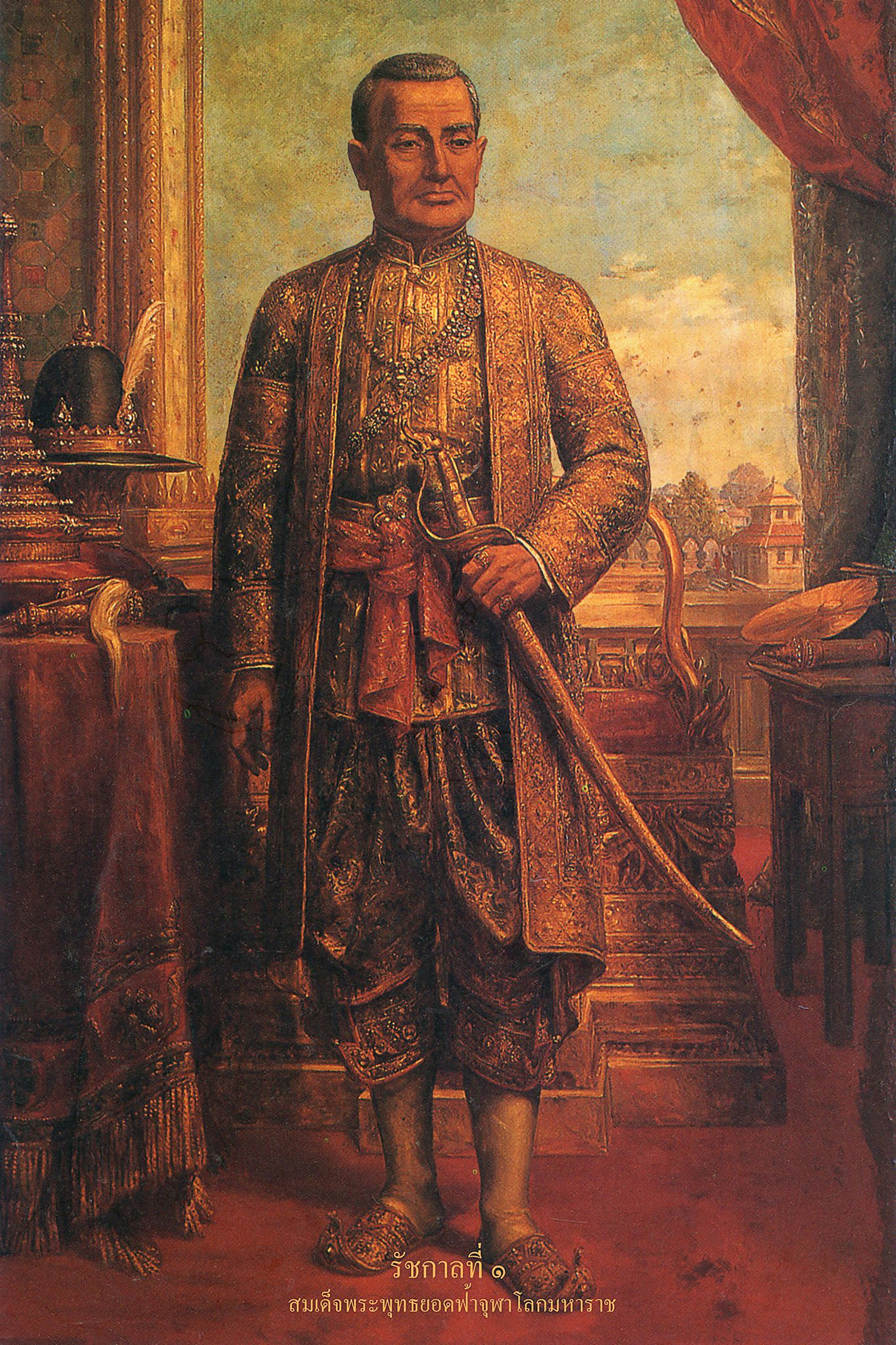
- Portrait at the Grand Palace, Bangkok

King of Rattanakosin
- Reign: 6 April 1782 – 7 September 1809
- Coronation: 10 June 1782 (1st); 17 June 1785 (2nd)
- Predecessor: Taksin (as King of Thonburi)
- Successor: Phutthaloetla Naphalai (Rama II)
- Viceroy: Maha Sura Singhanat; Itsarasunthon (later Rama II)
- Deputy Viceroy: Anurak Devesh (1782–1806)
- Born: Thongduang; 20 March 1737; Ayutthaya, Ayutthaya
- Died: 7 September 1809 (aged 72); Bangkok, Siam
- Burial: Wat Pho, Bangkok
- Spouses: Amarindra (Nak); and 43 concubines
- Issue: 21 sons and 21 daughters, including: Phutthaloetla Naphalai (Rama II); Maha Senanurak (Chui); Sakdiphonlasep (Arunotai); Paramanuchitchinorot; Kunthon Thipphayawadi
- Dynasty: Chakri
- Father: Thongdi (later Somdet Phra Pathom Borom Maha Chanok)
- Mother: Daoreung (Yok; later Phra Akkhara Chaya)
- Religion: Theravada Buddhism
- Seal

Military service
- Allegiance: Ayutthaya Kingdom; Thonburi Kingdom; Rattanakosin Kingdom
- Years of service: 1762–1809
- Rank: Luang (Ayutthaya); Somdet Chaophraya (Thonburi)
- Battles/wars: Taksin's reunification of Siam; Siamese–Vietnamese War (1771–1773); Siamese conquest of Cambodia; Siamese conquest of Lan Na (1774–1775); Bangkaeo Campaign; Athi Wungyi's War; Siamese Invasion of Laos; Tây Sơn wars; Nine Armies' Wars; Tha Din Daeng campaign

Phutthayotfa Chulalok (Note: Thai: พุทธยอดฟ้าจุฬาโลก) (born Thongduang (Note: Thai: ทองด้วง); 20 March 1737 – 7 September 1809), posthumously honoured as King Phutthayotfa Chulalok the Great (Note: Thai: พระบาทสมเด็จพระพุทธยอดฟ้าจุฬาโลกมหาราช, RTGS: Phrabat Somdet Phra Phutthayotfa Chulalok Maharat), also known by his regnal name Rama I, was the founder of the Rattanakosin Kingdom (now Thailand) and the first King of Siam from the reigning Chakri dynasty. He ascended the throne in 1782, following the deposition of King Taksin of Thonburi. He was also celebrated as the founder of Rattanakosin (now Bangkok) as the new capital of the reunited kingdom.

Rama I, whose given name was Thongduang, was born from a Mon male line descent family, great-grandson of Kosa Pan. His father served in the royal court of the Ayutthaya Kingdom. Thongduang and his younger brother Bunma served King Taksin in wars against the Burmese Konbaung dynasty and helped him in the reunification of Siam. During this time he emerged as Siam's most powerful military leader. Thongduang was the first Somdet Chao Phraya, the highest rank the nobility could attain, equaled to that of royalty. In 1782, he took control of Siam and crowned himself as the monarch. The most famous event in his reign was the Burmese–Siamese War (1785–1786), which was the last major Burmese assault on Siam.

Rama I's reign marked a revival of Siamese culture and state organization following the collapse of the Siamese kingdom in 1767, whose capital was then situated at Ayutthaya. He established a new purified Buddhist sect which allied and tied together Buddhism and the monarchy. Rama I consolidated and expanded on Taksin's military campaigns throughout Mainland Southeast Asia, whose mandala in 1809 stretched north to the Shan States, south to the northern Malay Peninsula and east to the Annamite Range. His reign also marked the beginning of a new "Golden Age of Culture", which continued in the footsteps of the blossoming of the arts during the Late Ayutthaya Period.

== Name ==
Like many high-ranking figures in premodern Siam, Rama I bore several names and titles over the course of his life—and even posthumously—reflecting his changing offices. His given name at birth was Thongduang (also spelled Thong Duang); family names had not yet been introduced in Siam.

When Thongduang served as the deputy governor of Ratchaburi Province during the reign of King Ekkathat of the Ayutthaya Kingdom, he held the title Luang Yokkrabat. After the fall of Ayutthaya, the new monarch, King Taksin, under whom he served as an important military commander, successively promoted him to the titles of Phra Ratcharin Chao Krom Phra Tamruat (chief of the police department), Phraya Aphaironnarit, Phraya Yommarat, Phraya Chakri, and eventually Chaophraya Chakri (minister of the northern provinces).

As Chaophraya Chakri, he commanded royal armies in campaigns against the Burmese, the Khmer, and the Lao, earning great distinction in royal service. Consequently, he was elevated to the rank of Somdet Chao Phraya (Note: The full honorific style was Somdet Chao Phraya Maha Kasat Suek Phiruak Mahima Thuk Nakhon Ra-a Det Nares Ratcha Suriyawong Ong Akkabat Mulikakon Bawon Rattanabarinayok (Thai: สมเด็จเจ้าพระยามหากษัตริย์ศึก พิฤกมหิมา ทุกนัครระอาเดช นเรศรราชสุริยวงษ์ องค์อรรคบาทมุลิกากร บวรรัตนบรินายก)) (equivalent to a Grand Duke) and was granted a royal palanquin, an ivory sedan chair with parasol, and various gold regalia—privileges equal to those of a Chao Fa-ranked prince or Chao Tang Krom (a prince governing a department).

When he ascended to the throne in 1782, he took the name Ramathibodi, just like the founder of the Ayutthaya Kingdom. His full title was much longer (Phra Borommarachathirat Ramathibodi Sisin Borommaha Chakkraphat Rachathibodin etc.), intended to demonstrate his universal claim to power like of earlier Siamese kings.

After his death, the people referred to him simply as Phaendin Ton ("the first reign"), to his son as Phaendin Klang ("the middle reign"). Continuing this system consequently, his grandson Rama III would have been "the last reign". To avoid this inauspicious title, he ended this practice by donating two Buddha statues that were placed to the sides of the Emerald Buddha at Wat Phra Kaeo and dedicated one each to his father and grandfather. He demanded to refer to his two predecessors using the names of these Buddha statues. The one dedicated to the first Chakri king was named Phra Phutthayotfa Chulalok ("the Buddha on top of the sky and the crown of the worlds"). This is how this king is still referred to in Thai history books.

His descendant Vajiravudh (Rama VI) who had studied in England, realised that most Siamese kings' names were difficult to reproduce and remember for Westerners. He therefore disposed to use for all kings of the Chakri dynasty the name Rama together with the respective ordinal number. So this king is Rama I in Western literature. In 1982, 200 years after his accession, the Thai cabinet decided to award him the epithet Maharat ("The Great").

== Early life ==
=== An Ayuttayan aristocrat ===
Monarchs of the Chakri dynasty
- Phutthayotfa Chulalok (Rama I)
- Phutthaloetla Naphalai (Rama II)
- Nangklao (Rama III)
- Mongkut (Rama IV)
- Chulalongkorn (Rama V)
- Vajiravudh (Rama VI)
- Prajadhipok (Rama VII)
- Ananda Mahidol (Rama VIII)
- Bhumibol Adulyadej (Rama IX)
- Vajiralongkorn (Rama X)

Thongduang was born in 1737, during the reign of King Boromakot of Ayutthaya. His father was Thongdi, a nobleman of Mon ancestry who served at the royal court. Thongdi held the title Phra Akson Sunthonsat (royal secretary for northern Siam and keeper of the royal seal) and was later posthumously elevated to Somdet Phra Prathom Borommahachonnok ("Grand Primordial Father"). Phra Akson Sunthonsat was also a descendant of Kosa Pan, the leader of King Narai's embassy to the French court. His mother, Daoreung (born Yok), was the eldest daughter of a wealthy Hokkien Chinese magnate. Thongduang had six other siblings.

At a young age, Thongduang entered the royal court as a mahadlek (royal page) in the service of King Uthumphon, where he met his childhood friend Sin. In 1757, aged 21, he temporarily entered the monkhood in accordance with Siamese custom. In 1760, he married Nak, the daughter of a local patron in Samut Sakhon. He was later appointed Luang Yokkrabat of Ratchaburi, then an important frontier town and frequent battlefield on the western approaches to the kingdom, during the late Ayutthaya period.

=== Service under Taksin ===
On the eve of the fall of Ayutthaya, Phraya Wachiraprakan (later King Taksin) had foreseen that the fall of the city was certain. Wachiraprakan decided to break the siege of the city of Ayutthaya by the Burmese army and establish a new base outside. Phraya Ratchaburi also joined this venture. In 1767, Ayutthaya under King Ekkathat fell to Burmese invaders, the city was completely destroyed; burned and looted. Local warlords rose up to establish their supremacy in the absence of a central authority.

Despite the fall of Ayutthaya, Taksin and his men managed to capture Chantaburi and Trat in the same year. During this time, Phraya Ratchaburi became one of Taksin's six ministers, and together with Bunma (the future Maha Sura Singhanat), the two became Taksin's most successful generals.

=== Military leader ===
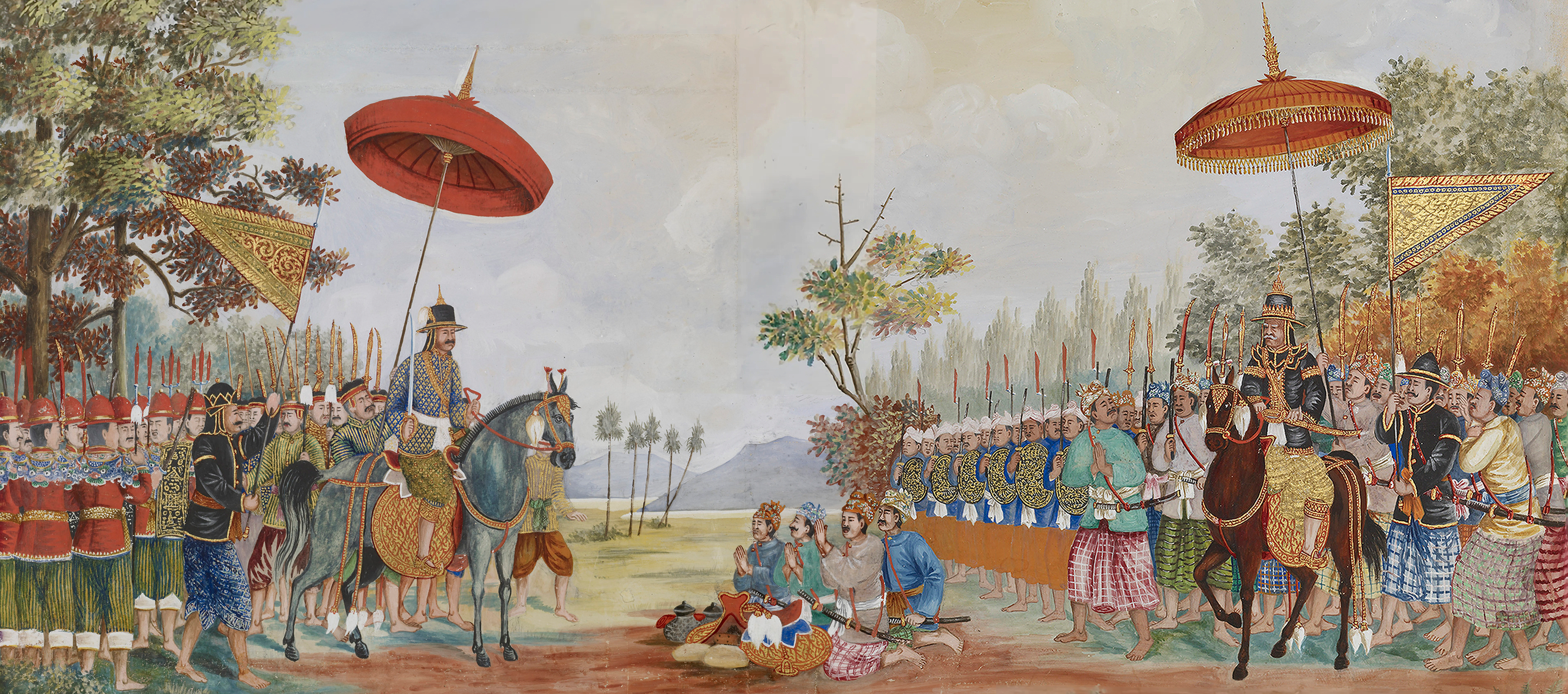
Maha Thiha Thura (right) meets Chao Phraya Chakri (left) between the siege of Phitsanulok in 1775

Swiftly Taksin made a strategic plan and under it recaptured Ayutthaya in one year. In 1768 Taksin crowned himself and founded the Kingdom of Thonburi on the west bank of the mouth of the Chao Phraya river, using Thonburi as a new capital. Under the new Thonburi regime, Thongduang was appointed head of the royal police department, bearing the title Phra Ratcharin. After subjugating the warlord of Phimai with his brother Bunma (at that time called Phra Mahamontri), he was raised to Phraya Aphairanarit

After the campaign to subdue the lord of Fang in 1769, Thongduang was raised to Phraya Yommarat. and in the next year became Chao Phraya Chakri – the Samuhanayok (chief minister for the northern provinces). Chakri commanded the Siamese troops in the wars against Burma and went on to subjugate Cambodia. His brother Bunma (who by that time held the title of Phraya Anuchit Raja), accompanied him in various campaigns. Chakri and his brother were sent to the north to Lan Na in 1774 to free the kingdom from Burmese rule with the help of Phraya Kawila, a prince from Lampang. In 1776, he conquered Khmer Pa Dong. He was assigned the task of conquering Lao kingdoms in 1778 and all the three kingdoms (Vientiane, Luang Prabang, Champasak) fell to the Siamese in the same year. He was eventually raised to Somdet Chao Phraya Maha Kasat Suek (lit. 'Great King of War'), the first vassal to ever hold this rank.

== Ascension as King ==
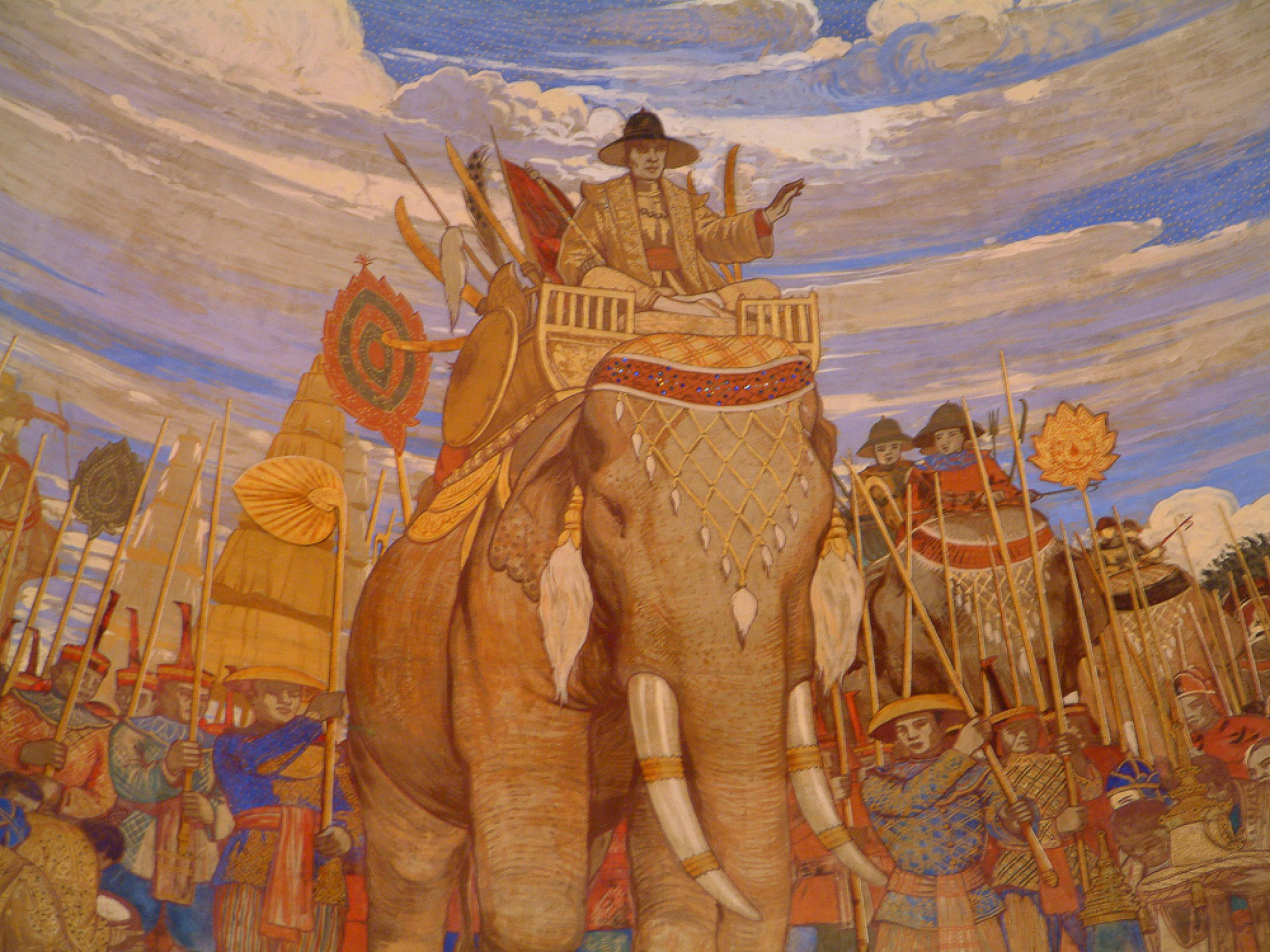
General Thongduang returns to Thonburi in 1782. Fresco in Dusit Palace

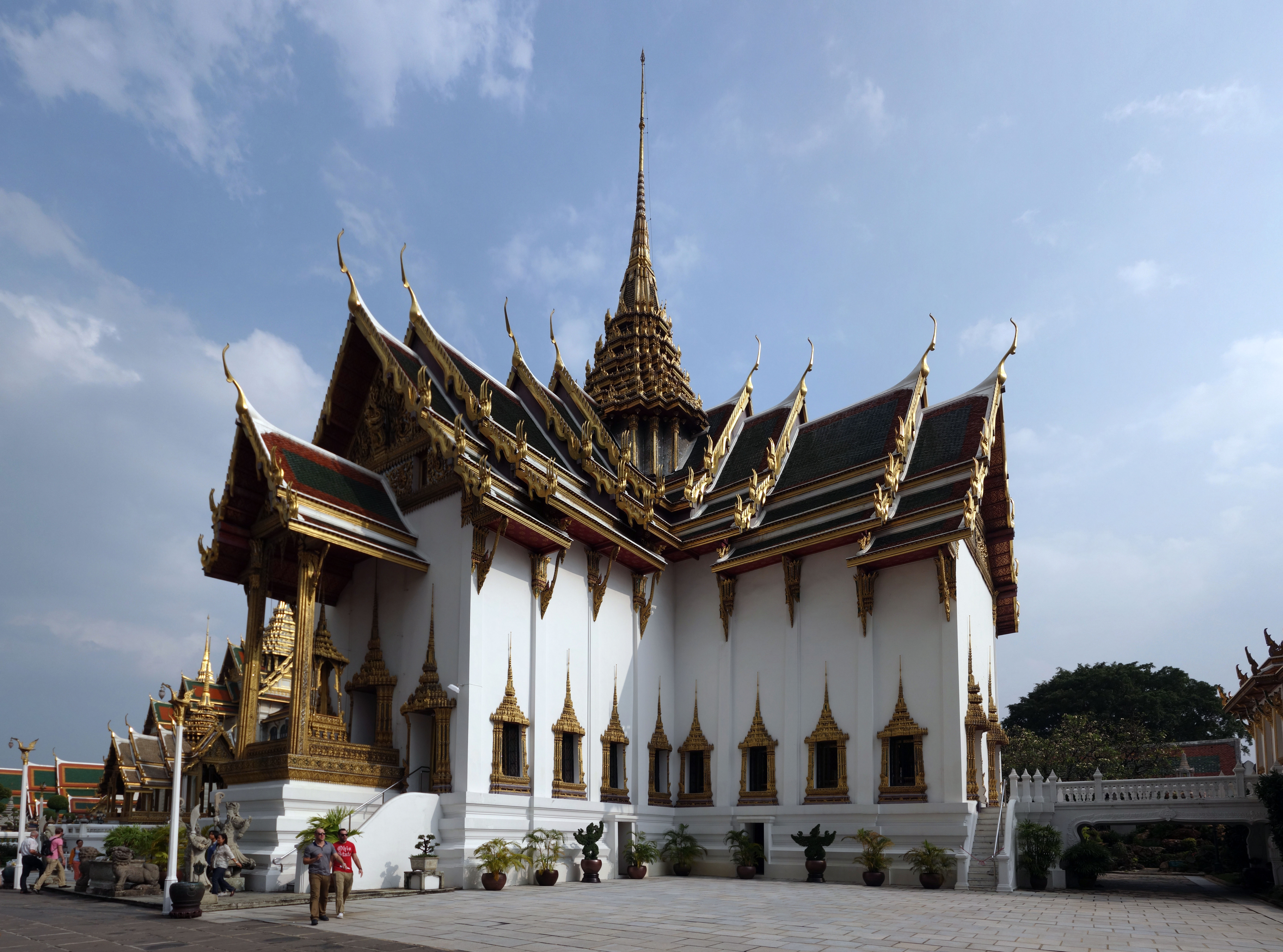
The Dusit Maha Prasat Throne Hall inside the Grand Palace. Rama I ordered the palace built in 1782 as the centre of his new capital

In 1781, he went on the campaigns against Cambodia, only to return prematurely due to the instability of Thonburi. The rebellion of Phraya Sun had broken out and the rebels deposed King Taksin. Some sources report that Taksin was consigned to a monastery. After arriving in Thonburi in 1782, Chao Phraya defeated the Phraya Sun with his forces. Later sources widely reported that the general eventually executed the ousted Taksin, contradicting to some earlier sources. He then seized power and made himself King, establishing the Chakri dynasty, which continues to rule Thailand to this day.

General Maha Kasatsuek crowned himself on 6 April 1782. Soon after, he decided to move the capital of Siam to the east bank of the Chao Phraya river for several reasons, including its better strategic location and a desire to promote his legitimacy by starting from a clean slate. He decided to name his new capital "Rattanakosin" ("Keeping place of the Emerald Buddha"). Rama I also raised various members of his family to royalty. He appointed his brother Surasi (Anuchit Raja) or Maha Sura Singhanat as the "Front Palace" (conventional title of the viceroy and heir presumptive) and his nephew Thong-In or Anurak Devesh as the "Rear Palace".

The King had 42 children. Ten of these were born to Queen Amarinda, the others by various concubines. The Queen's children included Prince Isarasundhorn, later King Phutthaloetla Naphalai (Rama II) (whom the King appointed as Front Palace after the death of Maha Sura Singhanat in 1803), Prince Maha Senanurak and Prince Maha Sakdi Polsep.

== Foreign policy and war ==
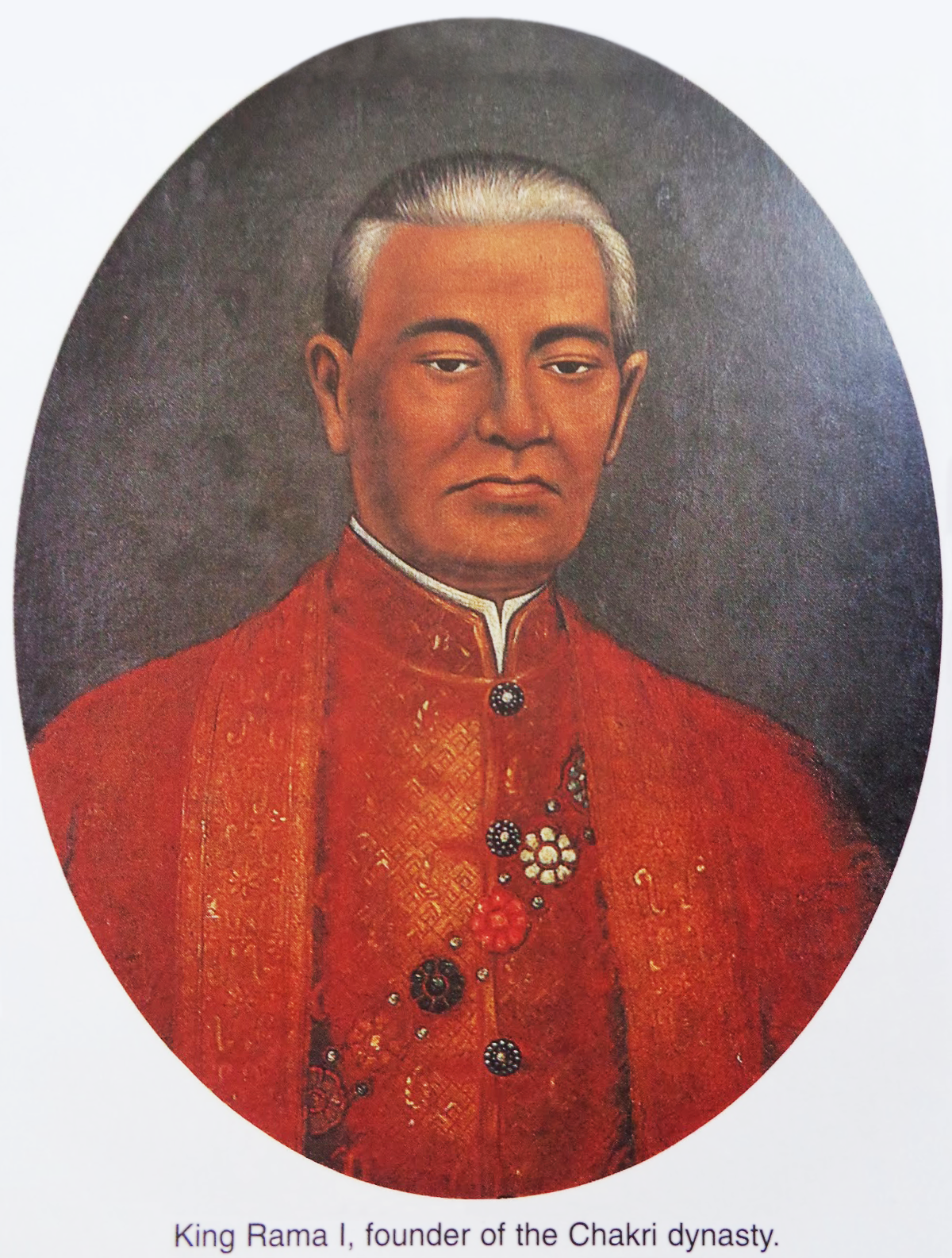
King Rama 1 Chulalok tondo portrait 1792

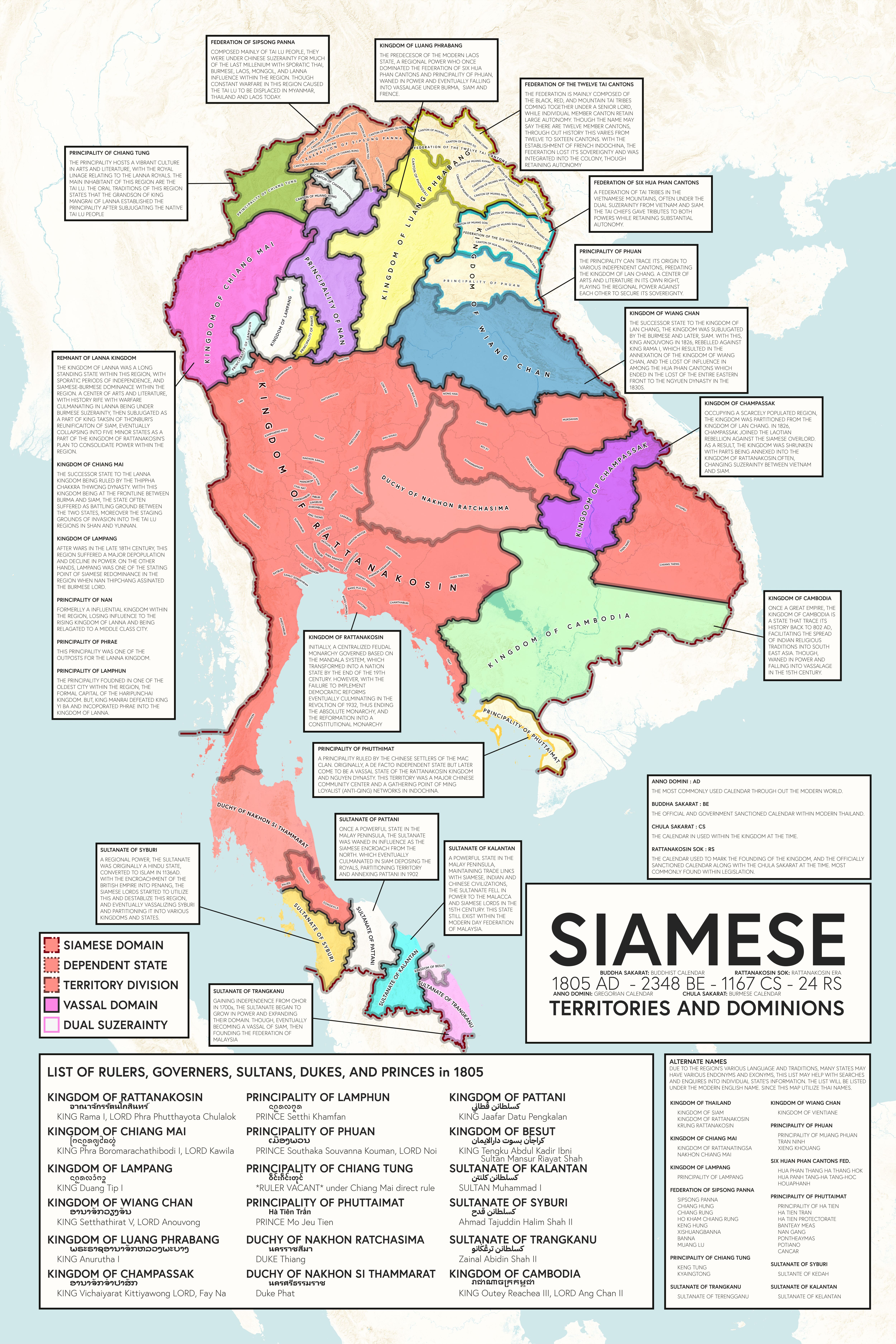
The extent of Siam's sphere of influence in the early 19th century.

=== Vietnam and Cambodia ===
In 1784–1785, the last of the Nguyễn Lords, Nguyễn Ánh, convinced Rama I to give him forces to attack Vietnam, which was then under the control of the Tây Sơn brothers. However, the joint Nguyễn-Siam fleet was destroyed in the Battle of Rạch Gầm-Xoài Mút in the Mekong Delta region. Nguyễn's appeal for Siamese assistance enabled the Siamese to exert considerable political influence over Nguyễn's court. Mac Tu Sinh, the son of Mạc Thiên Tứ and his Siamese wife, was raised among the Siamese, and held office as the governor of Hà Tiên until his death in 1787. Ngo Ma, a general of Siamese descent, was appointed as its acting governor in Mac's place. Nguyễn Ánh also took refuge in Siam at the King's court waiting for the opportunities to defeat Tây Sơn. These episodes demonstrated Rama I's willingness to extend Siamese power beyond his Kingdom.

In Cambodia, King Reamraja (Ang Non II) was deposed in 1779 and the throne was given to the young prince Ang Eng. However, the pro-Vietnamese policies of certain Cambodian aristocrats under Ang Eng alarmed Rama I. As a result, Rama I had Ang Eng captured and deported to Bangkok, where Rama adopted him as his son, the purpose of which was to impose pro-Siamese sentiments on him. Rama I also imposed Chaophraya Aphaiphubet as the Regent of Cambodia.

Nguyễn Ánh secretly left for Vietnam in 1787, leaving Rama I a note. Ánh managed to recapture Saigon by 1788 and later ascended as Emperor Gia Long in 1802.

In 1794, upon Ang Eng's majority, Rama I reinstalled him as the Neareay Reachea III. The area around Siem Reap and Battambang was annexed by Siam, and were governed by Aphaiphubet. However, Rama I allowed these territories to be ruled in accordance with Cambodian traditions.

=== Wars with Burma ===
Soon King Bodawpaya of Burma started to pursue his ambitious campaigns to expand his dominions over Siam. The Burmese–Siamese War (1785–1786), also known in Siam as the "Nine Armies War" because the Burmese came in nine armies, broke out. The Burmese soldiers poured into Lanna and Northern Siam. Siamese forces, commanded by Kawila, Prince of Lampang, put up a brave fight and delayed the Burmese advance, all the while waiting for reinforcements from Bangkok. When Phitsanulok was captured, Anurak Devesh the Rear Palace, and Rama I himself led Siamese forces to the north. The Siamese relieved Lampang from the Burmese siege.

In the south, Bodawpaya was waiting at Chedi Sam Ong ready to attack. The Front Palace was ordered to lead his troops to the south and counter-attack the Burmese coming to Ranong through Nakhon Si Thammarat. He brought the Burmese to battle near Kanchanaburi. The Burmese also attacked Thalang (Phuket), where the governor had just died. Chan, his wife, and her sister Mook gathered the local people and successfully defended Thalang against the Burmese. Today, Chan and Mook are revered as heroines because of their opposition to the Burmese invasions. In their own lifetimes, Rama I bestowed on them the titles Thao Thep Kasattri and Thao Sri Sunthon.

The Burmese proceeded to capture Songkhla. Upon hearing the news, the governors of Phatthalung fled. However, a monk named Phra Maha encouraged the citizens of the area to take up arms against the Burmese; his campaign was also successful. Phra Maha was later raised to the nobility by Rama I.

As his armies were destroyed, Bodawpaya retreated. The next year, he attacked again, this time constituting his troops as a single army. With this force Bodawpaya passed through the Chedi Sam Ong pass and settled in Tha Din Daeng. The Front Palace marched the Siamese forces to face Bodawpaya. The fighting was very short and Bodawpaya was quickly defeated. This short war was called the Tha Din Daeng campaign.

== Illness and death ==
Rama I died in Bangkok on 7 September 1809, aged 72, after a short but acute illness. According to Wat Pho's official history, he died at the Paisal Thaksin Throne Hall in the Grand Palace. He was succeeded by his son Prince Isarasundhorn as Phutthaloetla Naphalai (Rama II). Some of Rama I's ashes were later enshrined beneath the pedestal of the principal Buddha image (Phra Buddha Theva Patimakorn) in the ordination hall of Wat Pho.

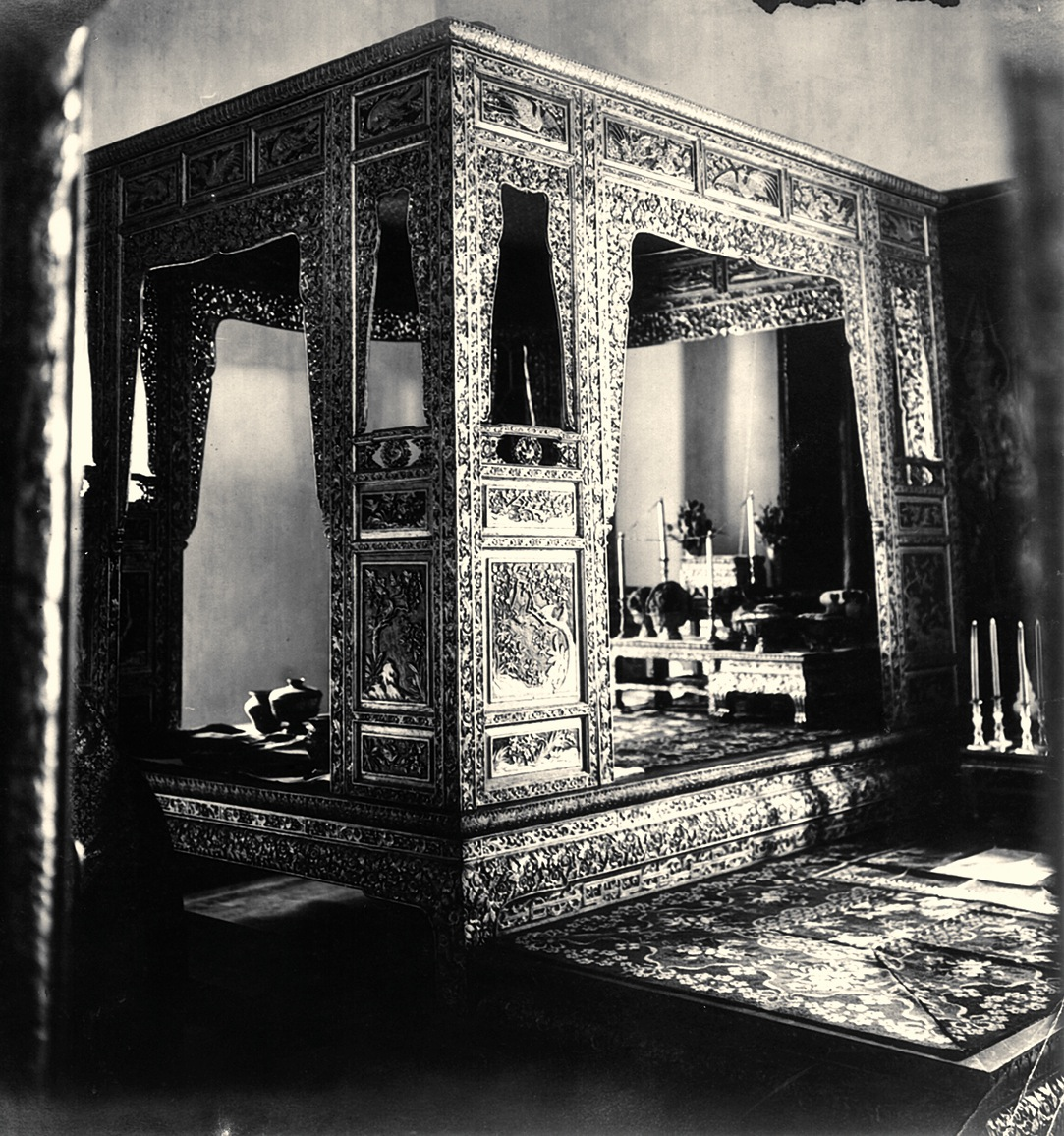
King Phutthayotfa Chulalok's bedchamber in the Chakraphat Phiman Hall within the Grand Palace.

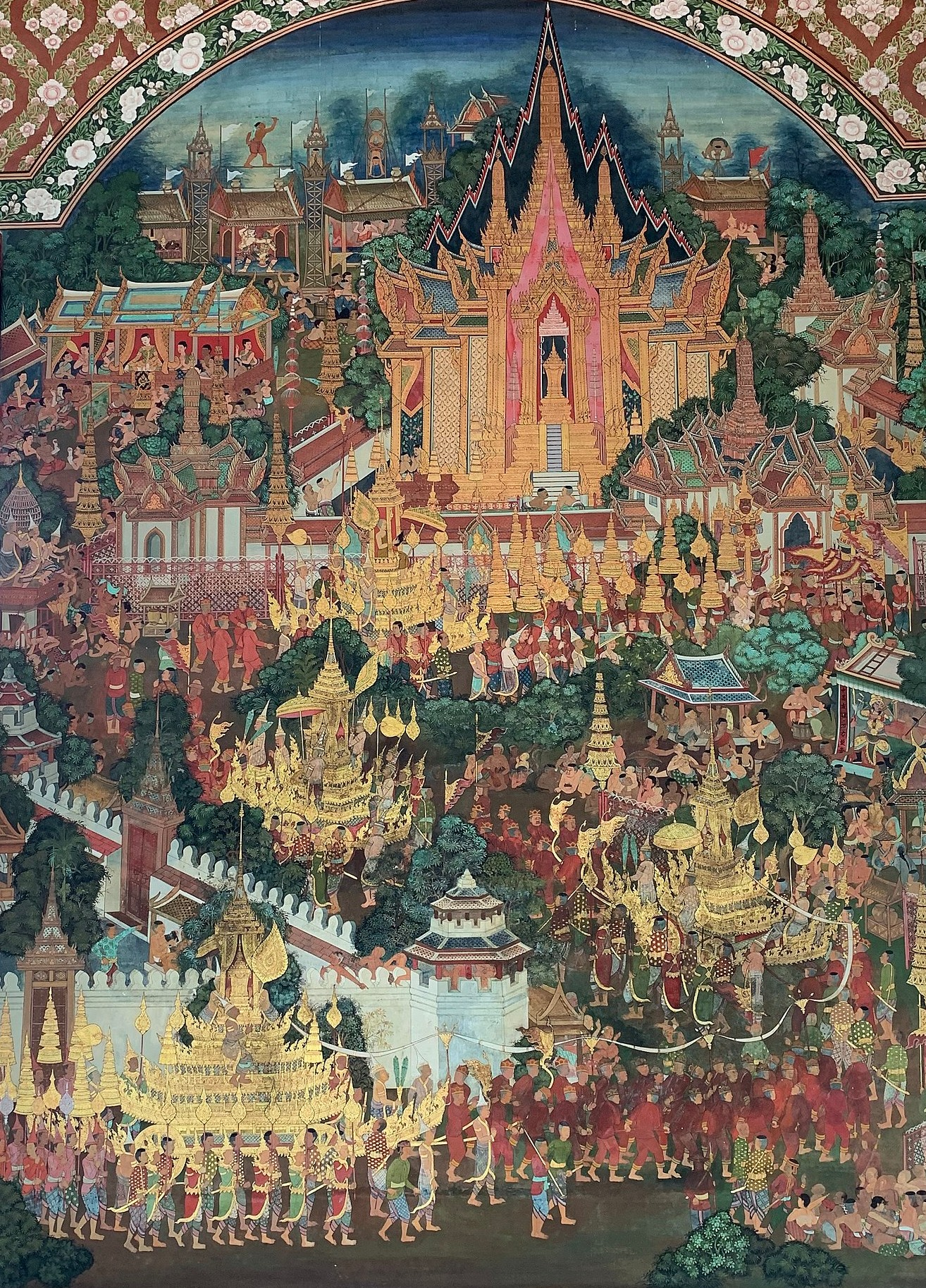
A mural at Wat Amphawan Chetiyaram depicting the funeral of Rama I.

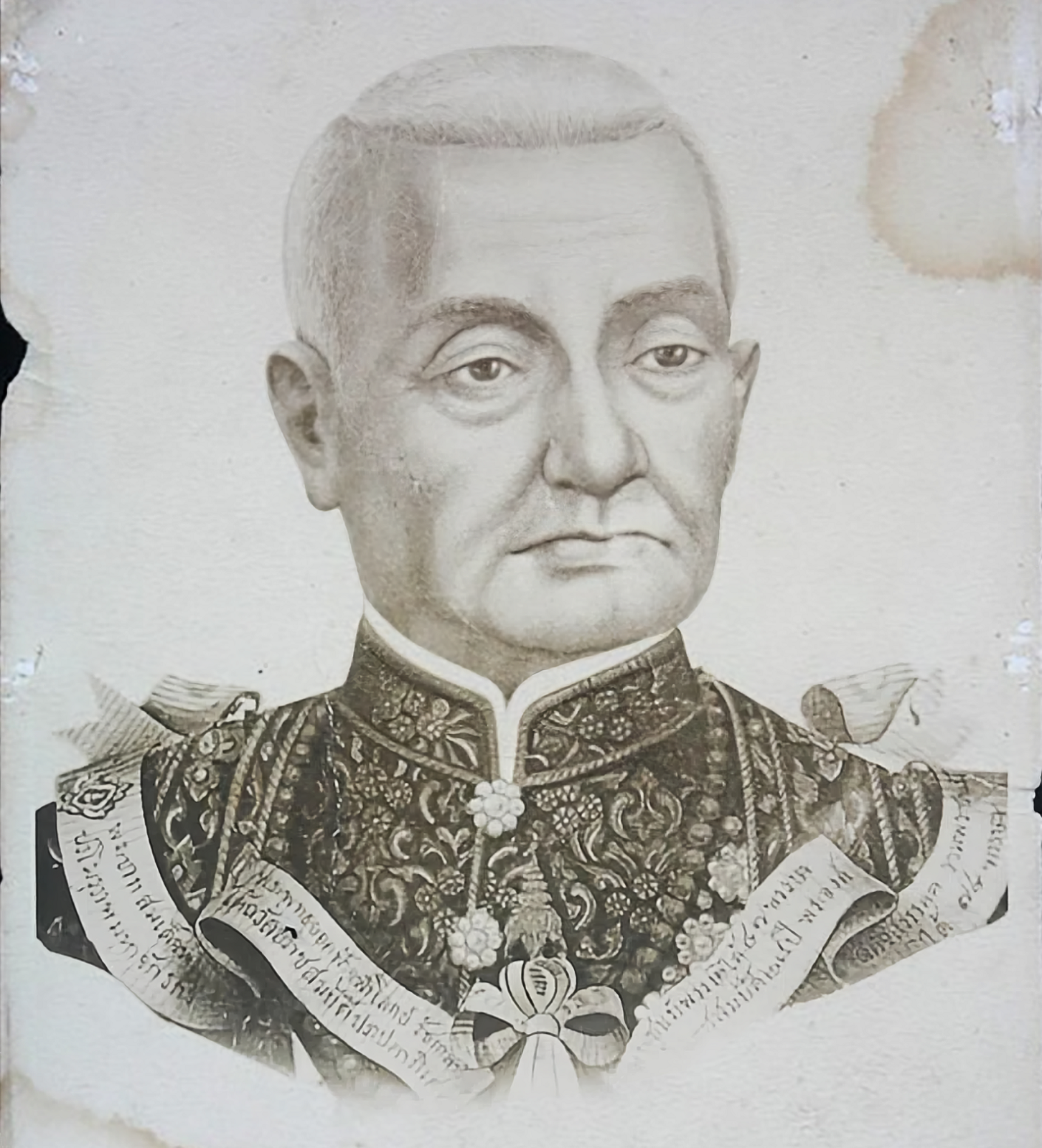
King Rama I Yodfa Chulalok Portrait Drawing

== Legacy ==
After the fall of Ayutthaya in 1767 and the brief Thonburi period, Siam faced the urgent task of restoring its independence and re-establishing internal unity. When King Rama I ascended the throne, and immediately focused on strengthening the kingdom both domestically and diplomatically. Determined to protect Siam from the persistent Burmese threat, he combined military campaigns with strategic diplomacy to extend Siamese influence over neighboring polities. As a result, during his reign, Siam reasserted itself as a major mainland Southeast Asian power, establishing suzerainty over Laos, Cambodia, and the northern Malay states and administering a newly extensive tributary realm.

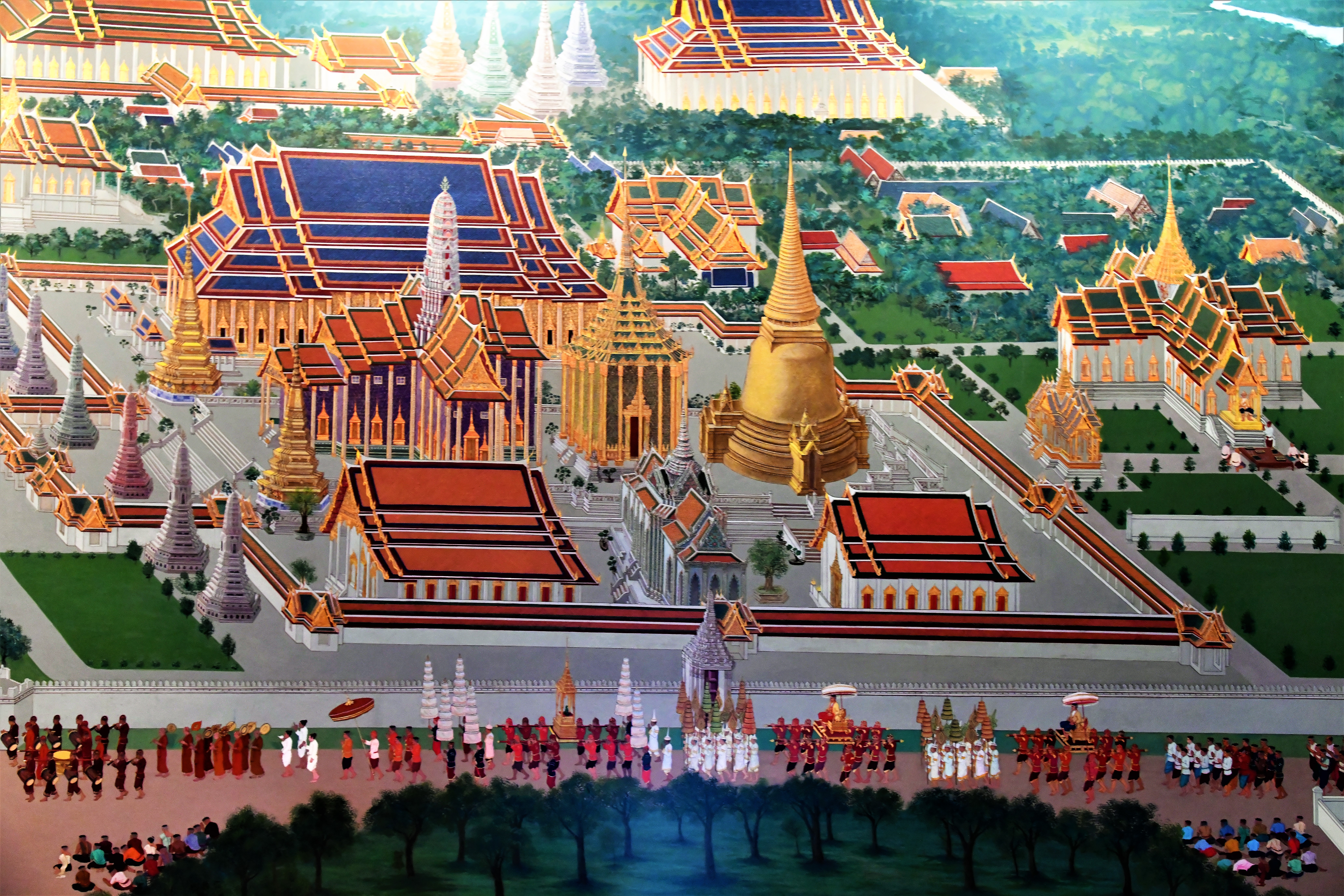
A mural depicting scenes from the Rattanakosin period at the National Memorial in Pathum Thani Province

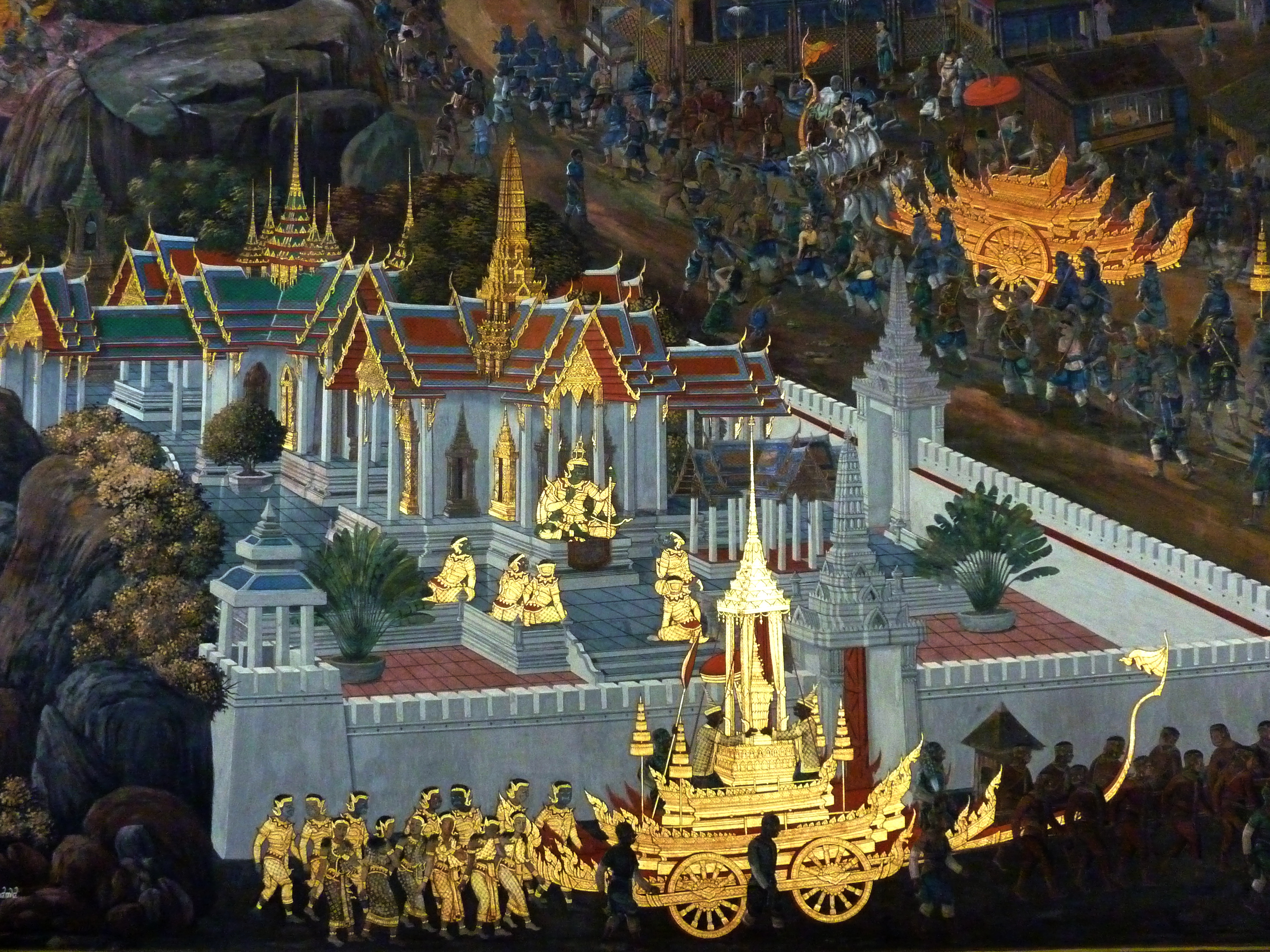
Mural of the Ramakien Epic, written by the King, the Thai version of the Ramayana, on the walls of the Temple of the Emerald Buddha, Grand Palace, Bangkok

His reign oversaw the institutional and cultural restoration of Siam after the fall of Ayutthaya. By relocating the capital to Bangkok in 1782, he established a new political and administrative center protected by waterways and canals, and oversaw the construction of the Grand Palace complex as both royal residence and the seat of government. The palace layout echoed earlier royal centers, combining throne halls, administrative buildings, and a royal chapel; within this complex he installed the Emerald Buddha at Wat Phra Si Rattana Satsadaram (Wat Phra Kaew), reinforcing the capital's role as a sacred as well as political hub.

In religious policy, he promoted the re-establishment of the Theravāda Buddhist order and scholarship in the new capital. A major landmark of the reign was the convening of a council to review and standardize the Buddhist canon (Tipiṭaka) in 1788, an effort described in Thai Buddhist historiography as helping safeguard orthodoxy following the disruptions of war and regime change.

Rama I also sought to regularize the legal order. In 1805, the court assembled surviving and current legal texts into a comprehensive compilation that became known as the Three Seals Law, named for the official seals used to authenticate the volumes. The code remained a central reference point for Siam's traditional legal system into the modern reform era.

Alongside state consolidation, the reign is remembered for cultural rehabilitation. Royal patronage supported the rebuilding and restoration of major temples and encouraged the recovery and rewriting of key works of Thai literature and performance repertoire, commonly framed as restoring continuity with the cultural inheritance of earlier kingdoms.

== In memoriam ==
Statue of King Rama I at the Memorial Bridge, Bangkok.

- "Chakri Memorial Day", a public holiday, is celebrated on 6 April, observed to commemorate the founder of the Chakri dynasty.
- A statue of Rama I in front of the Memorial Bridge (Phra Phutthayotfa Memorial Bridge).
- The 500 baht banknote, Series 16, issued in 2014, depicts images of the King Rama I monument, Wat Phra Chetuphon Vimolmangklararm Rajwaramahaviharn (Wat Pho), and Phra Sumen Fort on its back side.

== In popular culture ==
- Portrayed by M.L. Rujira Israngura Na Ayudhya in the 1952 Thai film Taksin The Great
- Portrayed by Surasit Satayawong in the 1955 Thai film Taharn Suea Phra Chao Tak
- Portrayed by Sompob Benjathikul in the 1984 CH3 TV drama Taharn Suea Phra Chao Tak
- Portrayed by Sombat Metanee in the 1988 CH3 TV drama Songkram Kao Thup
- Portrayed by Phutharit Prombandal in the 2004 CH7 TV drama Fa Mai, in the 2018 CH7HD TV drama Sai Lohit
- Portrayed by Sorapong Chatree in the 2007 CH3 TV drama Taksin Maharat
- Portrayed by Colonel Chainarong Kaewprasit in the 2012 RTA5 docudrama Seuk Kao Thup
- Portrayed by Tira Chutikul in the 2015 Thai film Siam Yuth The Dawn of the Kingdom
- Portrayed by Teerapat Sajakul in the 2017 True4U film series Sri Ayodhaya

== Ancestry ==
Ancestors of Rama I

16. Pan, Chao Phraya Kosathibodi
8. Khunthong, Chaophraya Worawongsathirat
4. Thongkham, Phraya Rajanikul
2. Thongdi, Chaophraya Chakri Sri Ongkharak of Phitsanulok Kingdom
1. King Phutthayotfa Chulalok, Rama I of Rattanakosin
3. Yok

== See also ==
- Thai monarchs
- List of people with the most children

== Notes ==
Phutthayotfa Chulalok (Rama I) House of Chakri Born: 20 March 1737 Died: 7 September 1809
Regnal titles
Preceded by Taksin as King of Thonburi	King of Rattanakosin; 6 April 1782 – 7 September 1809	Succeeded by Phutthaloetla Naphalai
Order of precedence
Preceded by The Princess Thepsuthavadi	Eldest Royal Member of the Chakri dynasty 1799–1809	Succeeded by The Princess Narindradevi
Political offices
New title	Second Grand Chancellor of Civil Affairs of Thonburi; 1770–1774	Position abolished
Preceded by Chaophraya Chakri	Grand Chancellor of Civil Affairs of Thonburi; 1774–1782	Succeeded by Chaophraya Rattanaphiphit
