= Anurak Devesh =

Siamese prince and military leader (1746–1806)

Thong-In; ทองอิน
- Prince Anurak Devesh
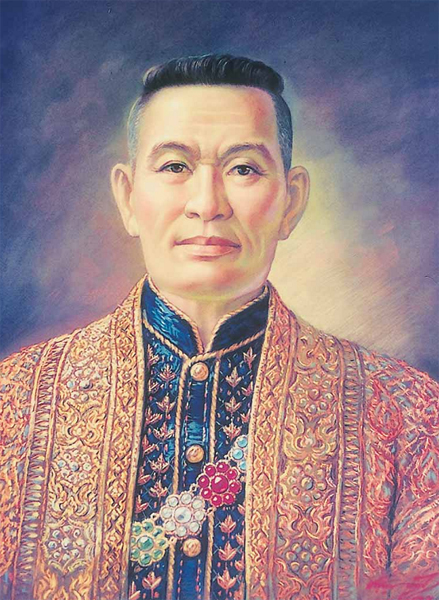
- Portrait at Wat Amarindraram

Deputy Viceroy of Rattanakosin
- Tenure: c. 1782 – 20 December 1806
- Appointer: Phutthayotfa Chulalok (Rama I)
- Predecessor: Borommakot (Phon) (as Deputy Viceroy of Ayutthaya)
- Successor: No successor until 1885, when the deputy viceroyalty was abolished
- Viceroy: Maha Sura Singhanat
- Born: 28 March 1746; Ayutthaya, Ayutthaya
- Died: 20 December 1806 (aged 60); Bangkok, Siam
- Spouses: Thongyu; Various consorts
- Issue: 35 sons and daughters
- Dynasty: Chakri
- Father: Phra Intraraksa (Seam)
- Mother: Thepsuthavadi
- Religion: Theravada Buddhism

Somdet Phra Chao Lan Ther Chaofa Thong-In Krom Phra Rajawang Boworn Sathan Phimuk (Thai: สมเด็จพระเจ้าหลานเธอ เจ้าฟ้าทองอิน กรมพระราชวังบวรสถานภิมุข, lit: His Royal Highness Prince Thong-In, the Deputy Viceroy of Siam) (28 March 1746 – 20 December 1806) was a Siamese prince and military leader. A nephew of King Phutthayotfa Chulalok (Rama I) the founder of the Chakri dynasty, he was appointed Deputy Viceroy or Rear Palace, the 3rd highest position in the kingdom. He was the only person to hold that title during the Rattanakosin Kingdom (1782–1932).

== Life ==
Thong-In (ทองอิน) was born on 28 March 1746 to an Ayutthayan aristocrat Phra Intraraksa (Seam) and Sa (later Princess Sister Thepsuthavadi; the eldest child of Thongdee and Daoreung). Sa was also the elder sister of Thong Duang, later Chao Phraya Chakri and in 1782 King Phutthayotfa Chulalok. Thong-In was the eldest child and had two younger brothers and one sister.

For a time Thong-In served in the army under King Taksin of Thonburi under the name Luang Ritnaiwair (หลวงฤทธิ์นายเวร). In 1780 he was raised to the rank of Phraya Suriyaphai (พระยาสุริยอภัย) and was appointed governor of Nakhon Ratchasima.

When his uncle ascended to the throne as King of the new Rattanakosin Kingdom in 1782, Thong-In was elevated to the rank of Chaofa (most senior rank of Prince). Soon he was appointed to the title of Krom Phra Rajawang Boworn Sathan Phimuk, or the Rear Palace, the Thai interpretation of the position of (Deputy Uparaja). This position made him the third most powerful individual in the Kingdom behind the Front Palace and the King. When the new capital was built at Bangkok, Prince Anurak Devesh built his residence (the actual Rear Palace) in Thonburi, directly across the Chao Phraya River from the Front Palace. Today the site is occupied by Siriraj Hospital.

After becoming the Rear Palace, he fought alongside King Rama I during the Nine Armies War in 1785 against King Bodawpaya of Burma. He personally accompanied the King during the recapture the city of Phitsanulok.

== Death ==
Anurak Devesh died on December 20, 1806, at the age of 60. After his death, King Rama I decided not to appoint anyone to succeed him as Rear Palace and left the office vacant. This custom was followed by subsequent kings until the official abolishment of the title in 1885 by King Chulalongkorn, thus making Anurak Devesh the only Rear Palace of the Chakri Dynasty.

The Prince had 35 children. Six were borne by his consort Thongyu, while the remaining 29 were borne by concubines. The six children from Thongyu (four sons and two daughters) received the title of Phra Ong Chao (the middle rank of Princes). The rest (borne with concubines) received the title of Mom Chao (the most junior rank of Princes). Additionally, during the reign of King Mongkut (Rama IV), all 35 children were given the additional title of "Royal Cousins" (พระสัมพันธวงศ์เธอ or Phra Samphan Wong Ther).

Anurak Devesh House of Chakri Born: 28 March 1746 Died: 20 December 1806
Thai royalty
Vacant Title last held by Borommakot (Phon) of Ayutthaya Kingdom	Deputy Viceroy of Rattanakosin c. 1782 – 20 December 1806	No successor until 1885 when the title was abolished
Political offices
Preceded by Chao Phraya Nakhon Ratchasima	Governor of Nakhon Ratchasima; 1780–1782	Succeeded by Phraya Nakhon Ratchasima
