= Borommakot =

King of Ayutthaya from 1733 to 1758

Borommakot บรมโกศ
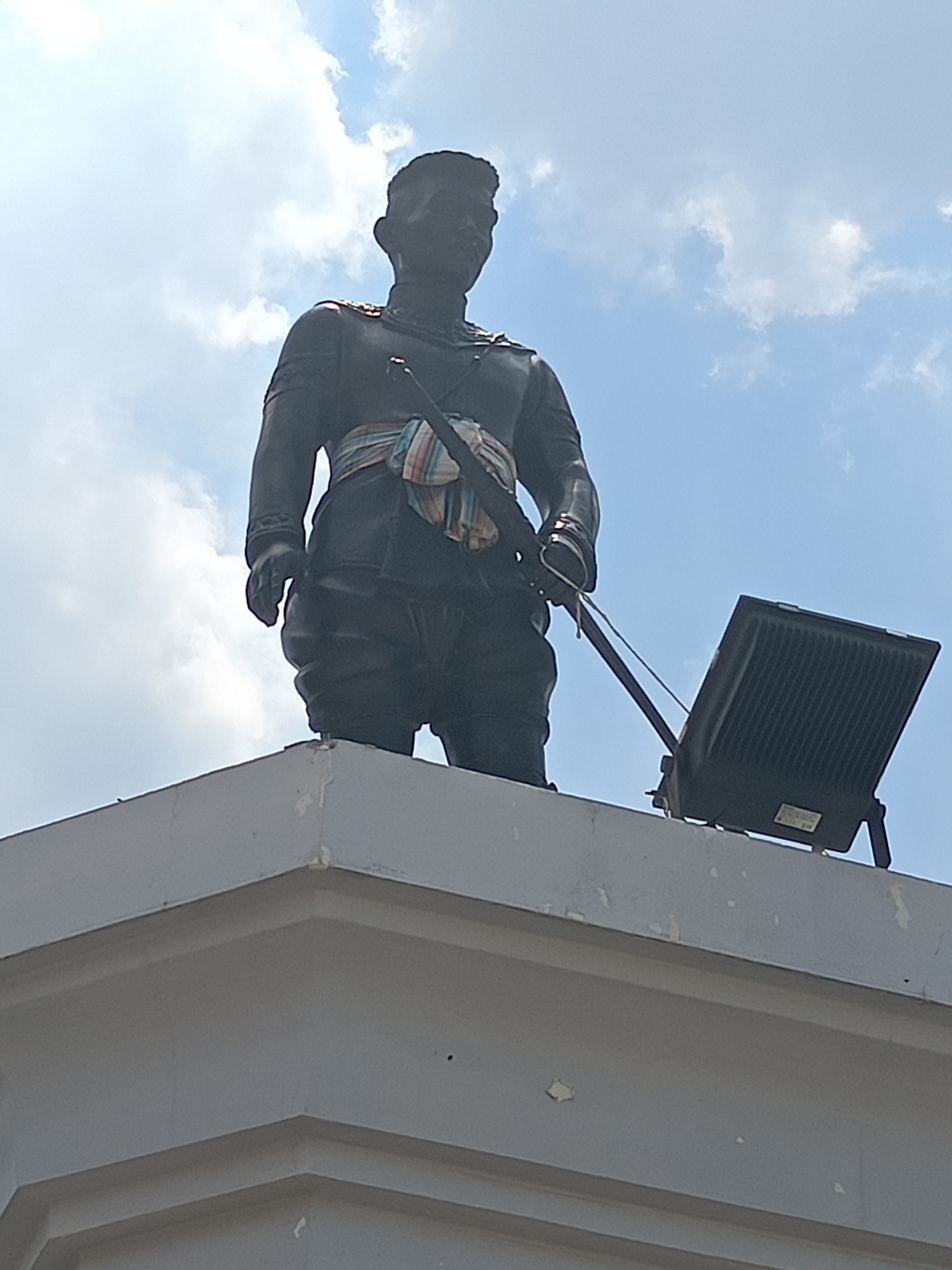
- Monument of King Borommakot at Wat Hantra, Phra Nakhon Si Ayutthaya Province

King of Ayutthaya
- Reign: 13 January 1733 – 26 April 1758
- Predecessor: Thai Sa
- Successor: Uthumphon

Viceroy of Ayutthaya
- Tenure: 1708–1732
- Appointer: Thai Sa
- Predecessor: Thai Sa
- Successor: Thammathibet

Deputy Viceroy of Ayutthaya
- Tenure: c. 1703–1708
- Appointer: Suriyenthrathibodi
- Predecessor: Chopkhotchaprasit
- Successor: Anurak Devesh (as Deputy Viceroy of Rattanakosin)
- Born: c. 1681; Ayutthaya Kingdom
- Died: 26 April 1758 (aged 77–78); Ayutthaya, Ayutthaya Kingdom
- Spouse: Phiphit Montri; Aphainuchit
- Issue: 108 sons and daughters, including: Thammathibet; Uthumphon; Ekkathat; Thepphiphit
- Dynasty: Ban Phlu Luang
- Father: Suriyenthrathibodi

King Borommakot (Thai: สมเด็จพระเจ้าอยู่หัวบรมโกศ, pronounced [bɔ̄ː.rōm.mā.kòːt]) or King Maha Thammarachathirat II (Thai: สมเด็จพระมหาธรรมราชาธิราชที่ ๒) was the king of Ayutthaya from 1733 to 1758. His reign was the last blooming period of Ayutthaya as the kingdom would fall nine years after his death.

Much of what survives in Ayutthaya today dates back to Borommakot's massive renovations of Ayutthaya temples in the second quarter of the 18th century. King Rama I attempted to emulate the religious customs of Ayutthaya during Borommakot's reign in the early Bangkok period and even postponed his coronation until he was certain that his coronation was confidently modelled off of Borommakot's coronation.

== Ayutthya civil war ==
Prince Phon (Thai: พร) was the son of Sanpet VIII. His elder brother, Prince Phet (เพชร), succeeded the throne as Sanphet IX (Thai Sa) in 1708. Phon was then appointed as the Front Palace. However, Thai Sa decided that upon his death the throne would be given to his second eldest son, Prince Aphai, since Thai Sa's eldest son had entered the priesthood. In 1732, Thai Sa died and a civil war commenced. Phon led his armies against his nephews, Prince Aphai and Prince Paramet. The civil war within Ayutthaya was "a big fight, bigger than any which had occurred in Siam in former times". With the victory ensured, Phon executed his nephews, the government civil servant allies, and took the throne as King Borommakot.

== Accession to the throne and rule ==
Because the Samuha Kalahom had lent the support to Prince Aphai, Borommakot removed the power of Samuha Kalahom by depriving its authorities over southern Siam and transferred the power to Kromma Tha instead. The Samuha Kalahom remained as a mere military figurehead.

Early in his reign in 1735, the king's eldest son and heir was accused of a love affair with one of his father's queen. The scandal led to the deaths of both the queen and the heir, leaving the country without an heir temporarily.

In spite of the bloodshed that preceded his reign, Borommakot was known for his reconstruction of Buddhist temples and the peace and prosperity Ayutthaya finally enjoyed again. In 1753, Borommakot sent two Siamese monks to rehabilitate Theravada Buddhism in Sri Lanka. The Buddhist Sangha from present-day Sri Lanka sent a mission to Ayutthaya requesting Thai monks to re-ordain monks in Kandy and also re-establish Buddhist scriptures there.

In 1741, Borommakot made his son Thammathibet the Grand Vizier. Thammathibet proved to be an able prince and was also known for being a poet. However, Thammathibet had affairs with two of Borommakot's concubines, Princess Sangwan and Princess Nim—a severe crime. The lovers were caught in 1746 and the three were beaten. The Grand Vizier was lashed 120 strokes and he died while he was beaten, and the two concubine princesses 30 lashes each. Princess Sangwan died 3 days later. Princess Nim survived, but she was banished from the court.

Borommakot then appointed his third son, Duea (เดื่อ; later became Uthumphon), as the Grand Vizier. Borommakot skipped his second son, Ekkathat, because he thought that Ekkathat was not suitable to be a king.

However, Ekkathat still had designs on the throne, and the subsequent struggles of the princes for the throne would contribute to the fall of Ayutthaya in 1767, during the reign of Ekkathat.

=== Renovation projects ===
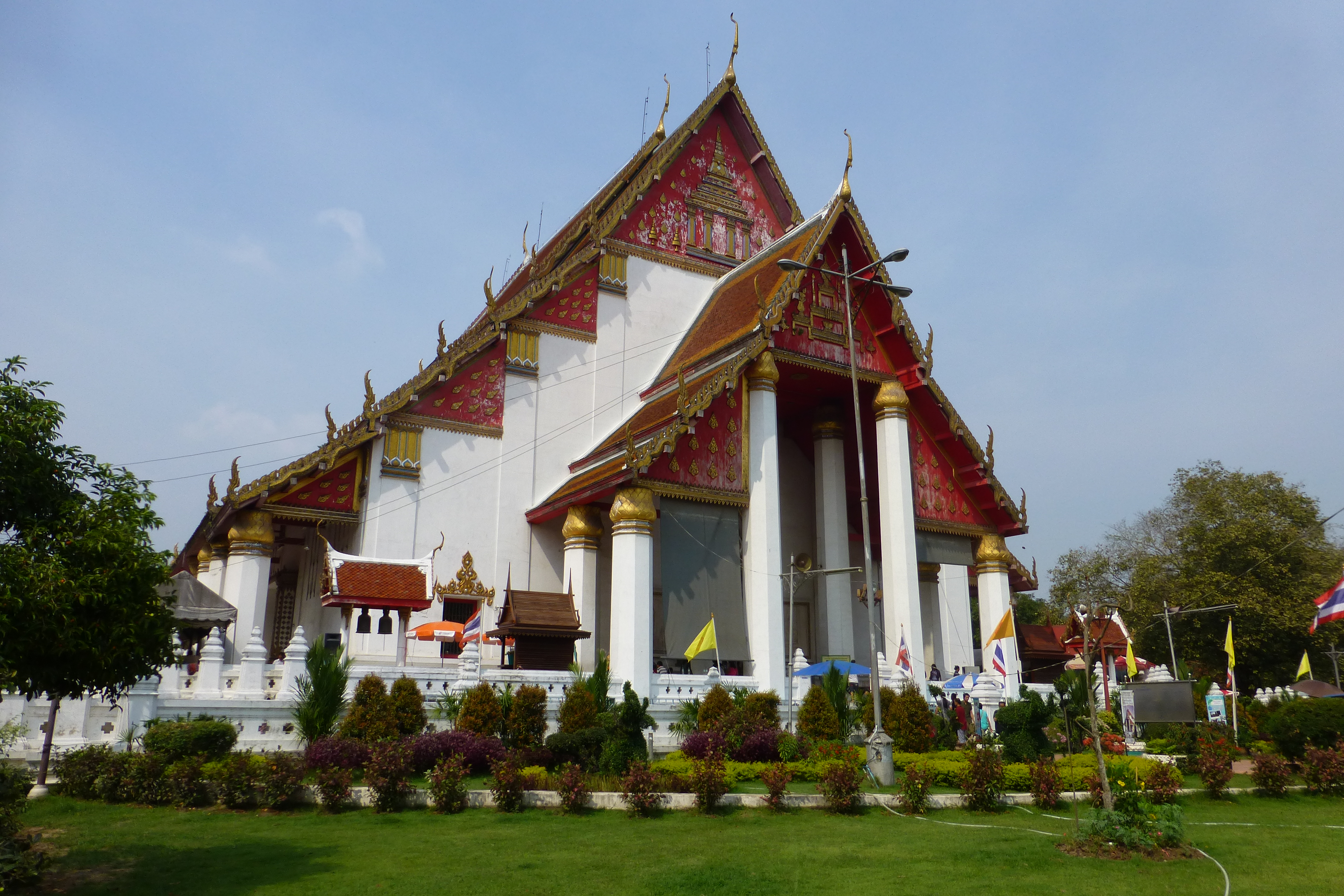
Wihan Phra Mongkhon Bophit, massively renovated under King Borommakot

Borommakot dramatically transformed the skyline of Ayutthaya, much of what survives in Ayutthaya today dates from his reign. Wihan Phra Mongkhon Bophit underwent major renovations by Borommakot, resulting in its current wihan design. Heavily damaged by the Burmese sack in 1767, the vihara was completely restored in the 20th century.

King Borommakot renovated both Wat Mahathat, Phitsanulok, and Wat Mahathat Thung Yang, as according to the Ayutthaya chronicles. The Ayutthaya Royal Palace and Wat Phu Khao Thong was also the scene of massive renovations partaken by Borommakot.

== Character ==
The Royal Chronicles of Siam from a British Museum manuscript describes King Borommakot as having a markedly different disposition from his father King Suriyenthrathibodi and his elder brother King Thai Sa. It states that he habitually refrained from killing, cultivated meritorious conduct, and was generous in giving alms to monks, Brahmins, beggars, and even animals; it also depicts him as enjoying recreational outings (including visits to Bang Pa-In and Nakhon Luang, boating excursions, and seasonal festivities).

The King Borommarachathirat (Borommakot) of this reign had a temperament different from that of his royal father (Suriyenthrathibodi) and his elder royal brother (Thai Sa). He constantly refrained from taking life; he conducted himself in meritorious and righteous ways. Monks, Brahmins, and the people lived together in happiness and enjoyment throughout the realm. The King had faith and gave alms to monks and Brahmins, to beggars and vagrants, and to animals of all kinds, without exception. At times he went to visit the palace at Ban O In (Bang Pa-In) and the royal city at Nakhon Luang. At times he boarded the great royal pavilion-barge and sailed down to the mouth of Phra Prataeng to view the waters and the fish. When it came time to thresh the rice, he went to thresh at the royal fields of Hantra, then put the rice into rantae (a winnowing tray) and had all the royal sons and daughters and the ladies of the palace pull it into the Inner Palace; then they made a great ceremonial "chatra" and rice gruel (khao yaku) and offered them each year to the senior monks at the royal monasteries, never failing to do so. The King never tired of amusements—running bulls and buffaloes, rowing boats, and staging fights between tigers and elephants—so there was enjoyment in every season.

— Royal Chronicles of Siam from a British Museum manuscript

A Sri Lankan embassy that came to Ayutthaya during Borommakot's reign (in the context of requesting Siamese monks to help revive Buddhism in Sri Lanka) praised the king in highly laudatory terms, emphasizing his moral conduct and manner of speech.

He is the king of the capital of Sriwardhana, steadfast in excellent conduct, and filled with many virtues. He rouses the hearts of the good, as the radiance of the sun falls upon a lotus. His voice is deep; his words are sweet as honey, and gladden the listener like the song of the karavika bird. He is foremost among those devoted to supporting the welfare of the whole world, a sustainer of the city of Sri–Kanta, and outstanding in all things.

— Sri Lankan embassy, Chronicle of Vilapadehera on the Sri Lankan embassy to Siam (tr. Nanta Sutakul)

== Legacy ==
Boromakot was revered by the later Bangkok aristocracy for his religious reforms at attempting to solve the issues of social turmoil, something which the later Bangkok aristocracy would attempt to implement in the Rattanakosin Kingdom under King Rama I's reign.

Rama I attempted to emulate the religious customs of Ayutthaya during Borommakot's reign in the early Bangkok period and even postponed his coronation until he was certain that his coronation was confidently modelled off of Borommakot's coronation.

== Issue ==
#	Consort and Concubines	Children
1.	Khao, Princess Aphainuchit	Thammathibet, Prince Senaphithak (or Narathibet); Princess Borom; Princess Suriya Wong; Princess Suriya; Princess Thida; Princess Ratsami
2.	Phlap, Princess Phiphit Montri	Princess Siripracha (or Prachawadi); Princess Siriprapha (or Praphawadi); Princess Inthawadi (or Phinthawadi); Princess Kasattri; Ekkathat, Prince Anurak Montri; Princess Buachan (or Chanthrawadi); Inthasudawadi, Princess Yisanseni; Uthumphon Ratchakuman, Prince Phon Phinit
3.	Princess Inthasucha Thewi	Princess Kunthon; Prince Aphon; Princess Mongkut; Prince Sangkhit
4.	Concubine Si	Princess Pha-op; Maengmao, Princess Wimonphat; Prince Sathit; Prince Phong; Prince Taeng
5.	Concubine Phi	Prince In
6.	Others	Khaek, Prince Thepphiphit; Mangkhut, Prince Chit Sunthon; Rot, Prince Sunthonthep; Pan, Prince Sepphakdi; Princess Fakthong

== Notes ==
Borommakot Ban Phlu Luang dynasty Born: 1680 Died: 26 April 1758
Regnal titles
Preceded by Thai Sa	King of Ayutthaya; 1733–1758	Succeeded by Uthumphon
Preceded by Thai Sa	Viceroy of Ayutthaya; 1709–1733	Succeeded by Senaphithak
Vacant Title last held by Chopkhotchaprasit	Deputy Viceroy of Ayutthaya circa 1703–1708	Vacant Title next held by Anurak Devesh of Rattanakosin Kingdom
