= Chopkhotchaprasit =

Deputy Viceroy of Ayutthaya
- Tenure: c. 1688 – ?
- Appointer: Phetracha
- Born: Ayutthaya
- Died: Ayutthaya
- Father: Unidentified
- Mother: Unidentified

Nai Chopkhotchaprasit (Thai: นายจบคชประสิทธิ์) was a Rear Palace of Kingdom of Ayutthaya in Ban Phlu Luang dynasty. He was the first Rear Palace of Kingdom of Ayutthaya.

Chopkhotchaprasit Born: ? Died: ?
Regnal titles
New title Establishment of a new position	Deputy Viceroy of Ayutthaya circa 1688 – ?	Succeeded by Phon
