= Suriyenthrathibodi =

Suriyenthrathibodi สุริเยนทราธิบดี
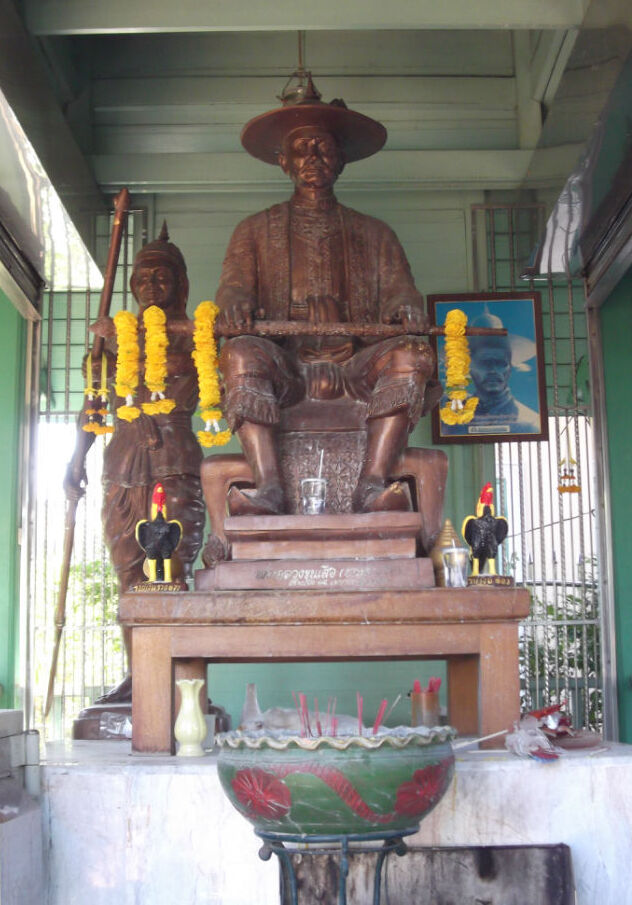
- Statue of King Suriyenthrathibodi, Wat Sai Temple

King of Ayutthaya
- Reign: 1703–1708
- Predecessor: Phetracha
- Successor: Thai Sa

Viceroy of Ayutthaya
- Tenure: 1688–1703
- Appointer: Phetracha
- Born: 1661; Phichit Province, Ayutthaya Kingdom
- Died: 1708 (aged 46–47); Ayutthaya, Ayutthaya Kingdom
- Issue: Thai Sa; Borommakot; Princess Kaeo; Princess Thapthim
- Dynasty: Ban Phlu Luang
- Father: Phetracha
- Mother: Kusawadi of Chiang Mai

King Suriyenthrathibodi (Thai: สมเด็จพระเจ้าสุริเยนทราธิบดี) or Luang Sorasak (Thai: หลวงสรศักดิ์)—was originally named Duea or Maduea (Thai: เดื่อ, มะเดื่อ), and King Chulalongkorn later issued a royal judgement identifying his regnal name as Sanphet VIII (Thai: สมเด็จพระสรรเพชญ์ที่ ๘). He was the 29th monarch of the Ayutthaya Kingdom and the second king of the Ban Phlu Luang dynasty, the last dynasty of Ayutthaya.

People in his reign often referred to him as Phra Chao Suea (Thai: พระเจ้าเสือ "Tiger King"), likening him to a tiger for his fierce and cruel temperament. He was also renowned for his prowess in Muay Thai and is credited with devising mae mai muay thai (fundamental Muay Thai techniques), for which clear historical evidence exists; these were later transmitted in manuals so that later generations of Thais could learn and practise them down to the present.

The Office of the National Culture Commission (ONCC) states in its book Silpa Muay Thai (The Art of Muay Thai) that the king once disguised himself as a commoner and fought skilled boxers from Wiset Chai Chan, defeating three leading fighters. Today, the Ministry of Culture designates 6 February—corresponding to the date of his accession attested in historical evidence—as National Muay Thai Day.

In addition, he trained his royal sons—Thai Sa and Borommakot—to be skilled in Muay Thai, Krabi-Krabong, and wrestling.

== Origins and parentage ==
Thai chronicle traditions disagree on King Suea's parentage. The Phan Chantanumat (Choem) Chronicle states that he was a somdet phra chao luk ya thoe ("royal son") of Phetracha. By contrast, the Somdet Phra Phonnarat, Wat Phra Chetuphon manuscript chronicle claims that he was a secret son of Narai and a royal consort who was the daughter of Phraya Saen Luang, ruler of Chiang Mai.

Related testimony literature also preserves varying details about the mother. The Testimony of Khun Luang Ha Wat gives her name as Phra Ratchachaya Devi or Chao Chom Sombun, while the Testimony of the Inhabitants of the Old Capital calls her Nang Kusawadi.

These accounts broadly agree that she had been Narai's secret consort and was later given to Phetracha when he held office as chao krom chang (head of the Elephant Department), differing mainly in her name and in the explanation for why the child was raised under Phetracha's household.

The Testimony of the Inhabitants of the Old Capital explains Narai's motive as fear that the prince might later attempt to seize the throne, as in the case of Phra Sisilp. The Testimony of Khun Luang Ha Wat instead states that Narai wished to preserve the succession for sons born to the queen consort only.

In the same narrative tradition, Narai is said to have ordered Chao Phraya Surasi (later Phetracha) to take Kusawadi as his wife, and to treat any son as his own; after the birth of a boy, Narai is said to have bestowed many goods upon the child, who later received the noble title Chao Phraya Si Sorasak.

=== Names and birth traditions ===
The Somdet Phra Phonnarat Chronicle records his original name as Maduea (มะเดื่อ). In Pathomwong by K.S.R. Kulap, he is instead called Dok Duea (ดอกเดื่อ), explained as a reference to his birth beneath a fig tree in the Phichit area while his mother was accompanying Ok Phra Phetracha on a royal journey with Narai to worship the Phra Phuttha Chinnarat and Phra Phuttha Chinnasi at Phitsanulok.

=== Birth year ===
A key clue for his birth year appears in the writings of the German physician Engelbert Kaempfer, attached to a Dutch East India Company mission to Siam in 1690. Kaempfer states that Phra Sorasak (Peja Surusak), the uparat (viceroy), was 20 years old in 1690. This would place his birth around 1670.

== The "Revolution" of 1688 ==
When King Narai was seriously ill with no hope of recovery, Phetracha arrested the King, his adopted son Phra Pi, and Constantine Phaulkon and the French officers on 18 May 1688. Phetracha and Sorasak were part of a xenophobic clique within the Siamese nobility and thus, rallied many disgruntled Siamese nobles who felt eclipsed by the influence of foreigners at court. Phra Pi was executed on 20 May. Phaulkon too was executed by Luang Sorasak on 5 June. Narai, on his deathbed, was unable to do anything, except cursing Luang Sorasak and his adoptive father Phetracha. Luang Sorasak then had Narai's two half-brothers, Prince Aphaithot and Prince Noi, executed.

Following the death of King Narai, Phetracha had proclaimed himself King, he appointed Luang Sorasak as the Prince Viceroy.

== Becoming the "Tiger King" ==
After the death of his adoptive father Phetracha in 1703, Sorasak triumphed over his younger half-brother Prince Khwan, another son of Phetracha with Princess Sisuphan, and was proclaimed as the new king. Despite the promise of giving up his throne to Prince Khwan when he reached a certain age, Sorasak secretly had him executed.

As king, he constructed Wat Pho Prathap Chang at the alleged site of his birthplace in Phichit Province.

The Siamese commoners in his time gave him the name Phra Chao Suea, (Thai: พระเจ้าเสือ "Tiger King"), for he was, according to the official chronicles, as evil as a tiger. "Stories abound of his appalling private life and his acts of cruelty." The Chronicle of Ayutthaya, Phan Chanthanumat (Choem)'s Edition, described his behaviour as follows:

"His Majesty habitually pleased himself with liquor and intercourse with female children aged 11-12 years. If any female was unable to endure him and writhed in pain, His Majesty would become furious and crush her to death with his feet. But if any female could maintain her tolerance without struggle, His Majesty would be elated and bestow upon her certain gratuities and rewards.

"Furthermore, when His Majesty took a trip to any canal, sea, island or any other place full of sharks, sawfish and other aquatic beings, he always drank liquor. If any concubine, lady, page or official caused his barge shaken, His Majesty would exercise no judgment and express no mercy, but would be enraged and order the person to be dragged with a hook and thrown into water to be consumed by sharks and sawfish.

"Moreover, His Majesty never maintained himself in the five precepts. He gratified himself by having intercourse with the wives of the government officers. From that time onwards, he was given the name the 'Tiger King'."

The Chronicle of Ayutthaya, British Museum's Version, also contained the like:

"At that time, the king was of vulgar mind, uncivil behaviour, savage conduct, cruel habit. He was never interested in charitable activities, but only in the activities which breached the royal traditions. Also, he lacked inhibition, but was consumed by unholy sin. Eternal were anger and ignorance in his mind. And the king habitually drank liquor and pleased himself by having intercourse with female children not yet attaining the age of menstruation. In this respect, if any female was able to endure him, that female would be granted a great amount of rewards, money, gold, silks and other cloth. Should any female be incapable of bearing with him, he would be enraged and strike a sword at her heart, putting her to death. The caskets were every day seen to be called into the palace to contain the female dead bodies and to be brought out of the palace through a royal gate at the end of the royal confinement mansion. That gate thereby gained the name the 'Gate of Ghosts' until now."

== Suriyenthrathibodi and Phan Thai Norasing ==
There was a folktale that Suriyenthrathibodi's desire to save the life of his wheelsman Phan Thai Norasing showed his compassionate side. There is no historical proof for this story.

== Death ==
The Chronicle of Ayutthaya, Phra Chakraphatdiphong (Chat) Version described Suriyenthrathibodi to have died in 1708, after contracting an incapacitating and fatal illness during his pilgrimage to Phra Phutthabat Temple at Saraburi. It should be considered that the wilderness surrounding the temple complex was infamous for causing steep fatality rates amongst its local officials, as a result of malaria which is referred traditionally by Thais as “Forest disease” (ไข้ป่า).

== Issue ==
#	Consort and Concubines	Children
1.	Phra Phanwasa (meaning Queen mother)	Prince Phet (Thai Sa); Prince Phon (Borommakot); Princess Unnamed
2.	Others	Princess Kaeo; Princess Thapthim

Suriyenthrathibodi Ban Phlu Luang dynasty Born: 1661 Died: 1709
Regnal titles
Preceded by Phetracha	King of Ayutthaya; 1703–1709	Succeeded by Thai Sa
Vacant Title last held by Narai	Viceroy of Ayutthaya; 1688–1703	Succeeded by Thai Sa
