= Rear Palace =

Former viceregal Thai title

Deputy Viceroy of Siam
- กรมพระราชวังบวรสถานพิมุข
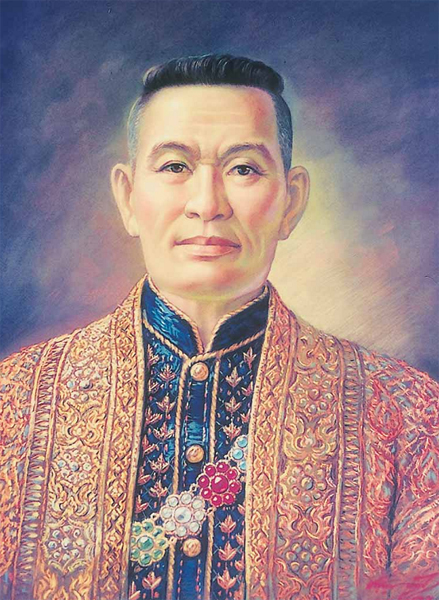
- Anurak Devesh (r. 1782 – 20 December 1806)
- Style: His Royal Highness
- Type: Heir presumptive; deputy uparaja
- Residence: Rear Palace (Wang Lang)
- Appointer: Monarch
- Term length: Life tenure, or until accession as Viceroy
- Formation: c. 1688
- First holder: Chopkhotchaprasit
- Final holder: Anurak Devesh
- Abolished: 20 December 1806
- Unofficial names: Rear Palace (วังหลัง)

Krom Phra Ratchawang Bowon Sathan Phimuk (Thai: กรมพระราชวังบวรสถานพิมุข), colloquially the Rear Palace (Thai: วังหลัง, RTGS: Wang Lang), ranked immediately below the Krom Phra Ratchawang Bowon Sathan Mongkhon or Front Palace. The position first emerged in the Ayutthaya period under King Maha Thammaracha, who built a palace to the rear of the main royal palace for his younger son, Prince Ekathotsarot, the younger brother of King Naresuan. This residence came to be known as the "rear palace", although at that time it did not yet constitute a distinct princely rank. During the reign of King Narai, his younger brother Phra Traibhuvanatthidtayawong was likewise housed in the rear palace, still without a formally defined title.

Under King Phetracha, Luang Sorasak was appointed to the Front Palace and Nai Chopkhotchaprasit to the Rear Palace. Both appointments were made by royal command, marking the beginning of the titles' political significance. In the reign of King Sanphet VIII (Phra Chao Suea), his eldest son Chao Fa Phet was appointed Krom Phra Ratchawang Bowon Sathan Mongkhon, known as Phra Banthun Yai, while his younger son Chao Fa Phon was appointed Krom Phra Ratchawang Bowon Sathan Phimuk, known as Phra Banthun Noi.

== List of Rear Palace lords ==
=== Ayutthaya ===
Rear Palace	Appointed by	Reign
Chopkhotchaprasit	Phetracha	circa 1688–?
Borommakot	Sanpet VIII	circa 1703–1708

=== Rattanakosin ===
Rear Palace	Appointed by	Reign
Anurak Devesh	Phutthayotfa Chulalok (Rama I)	circa 1782–1806
