= Front Palace =

Former Thai viceregal title

Viceroy of Siam
- กรมพระราชวังบวรสถานมงคล
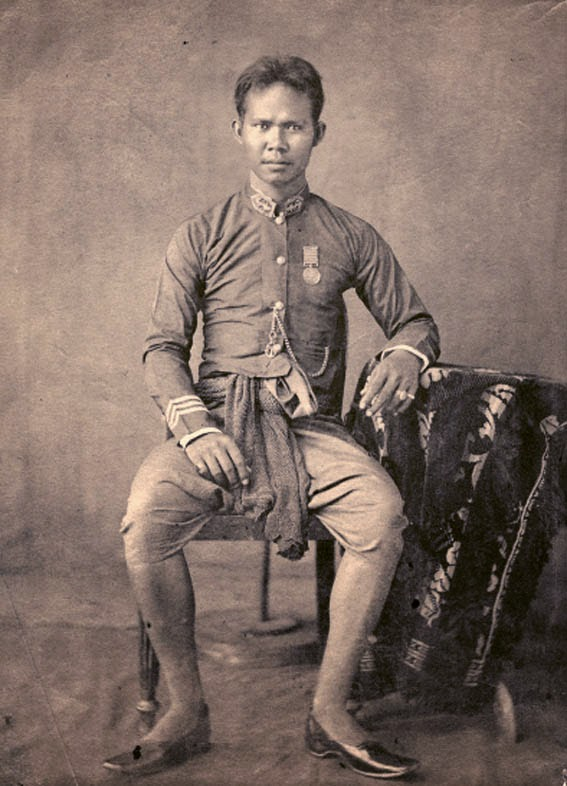
- Prince Wichaichan, the last holder of the Front Palace title
- Style: His Royal Highness
- Type: Heir presumptive; Uparaja
- Residence: Front Palace
- Appointer: Monarch
- Term length: Life tenure or until accession as Sovereign
- Formation: 1438 (588 years ago)
- First holder: Ramesuan
- Final holder: Wichaichan
- Abolished: 28 August 1885 (141 years ago)
- Succession: Crown Prince of Siam
- Unofficial names: Front Palace lord
- Deputy: Deputy Viceroy of Siam

Krom Phra Ratchawang Bowon Sathan Mongkhon (Thai: กรมพระราชวังบวรสถานมงคล), colloquially known as the Front Palace (Thai: วังหน้า, RTGS: Wang Na), was the title of the uparaja of Siam, variously translated as "viceroy", "vice king" or "Lord/Prince of the Front Palace", as the titleholder resided in the physical residence of the same name. The office of Front Palace was considered second only to the king and regarded as the heir presumptive. The name, with its dual meaning, originated in the Ayutthaya period, and the holder later gained significant powers during the Rattanakosin period. Front Palace occupants were usually a son or brother of the reigning monarch. The office existed until the death of the last occupant, Prince Wichaichan, in 1885. King Chulalongkorn then abolished the office of an heir presumptive, introducing in its stead the Western concept of a crown prince as heir apparent, and styled the new office "Crown Prince of Siam".

== Ayutthaya period ==
The Uparaja or Uparat concept of a Viceroy was of Greater Indian origin. In 1448, Sukhothai King Trailokkanat of was crowned as the king of Ayutthaya, uniting the two kingdoms. During the 15th century, the Kingdom of Sukhothai, centered on Phitsanulok, served as the seat of most of Uparats, as they were, with few exceptions, also king of Sukhothai. After the first fall of Ayutthaya in 1569, Maha Thammaracha crowned his son Naresuan as Uparat and king of Sukhothai/Phitsanulok. Naresuan then had a palace built in front of his Royal Palace, to be his son's place of residence when visiting Ayutthaya—thereby giving rise to the name "Front Palace." In 1583, Naresuan annexed the Sukhothai kingdom to Ayutthaya, and Phitsanulok ceased to be the seat of the Uparat. After his coronation, Naresuan appointed his brother Ekathotsarot to be the Uparat, stating that his brother in the Front Palace had equal status to the King in the Royal Palace.

Phetracha in 1688 appointed his son Luang Sorasak (later Sanpet VIII) as the Uparat living at the Front Palace. For the first time the descriptive term used was "Krom Phrarajawang Bovorn Sathan Mongkol" (Thai: กรมพระราชวังบวรสถานมงคล) (lit. The Great Auspicious Place). The Uparat was usually the brother of the king, and only heir presumptive to the throne, not heir apparent. This created an air of uncertainty about the succession upon the death of the king; keeping the heir close at hand in the Great Auspicious Place proved a means for keeping an eye on him, lest he presume too much. When the Uparat died before the king, the title often remained vacant for several years, until the King deigns to appoint a new vice-king.

== Rattanakosin period ==
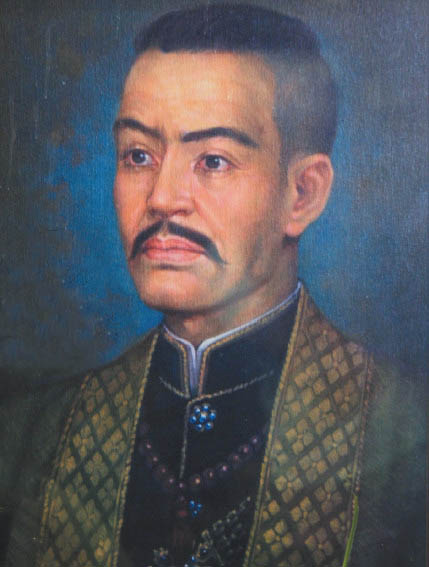
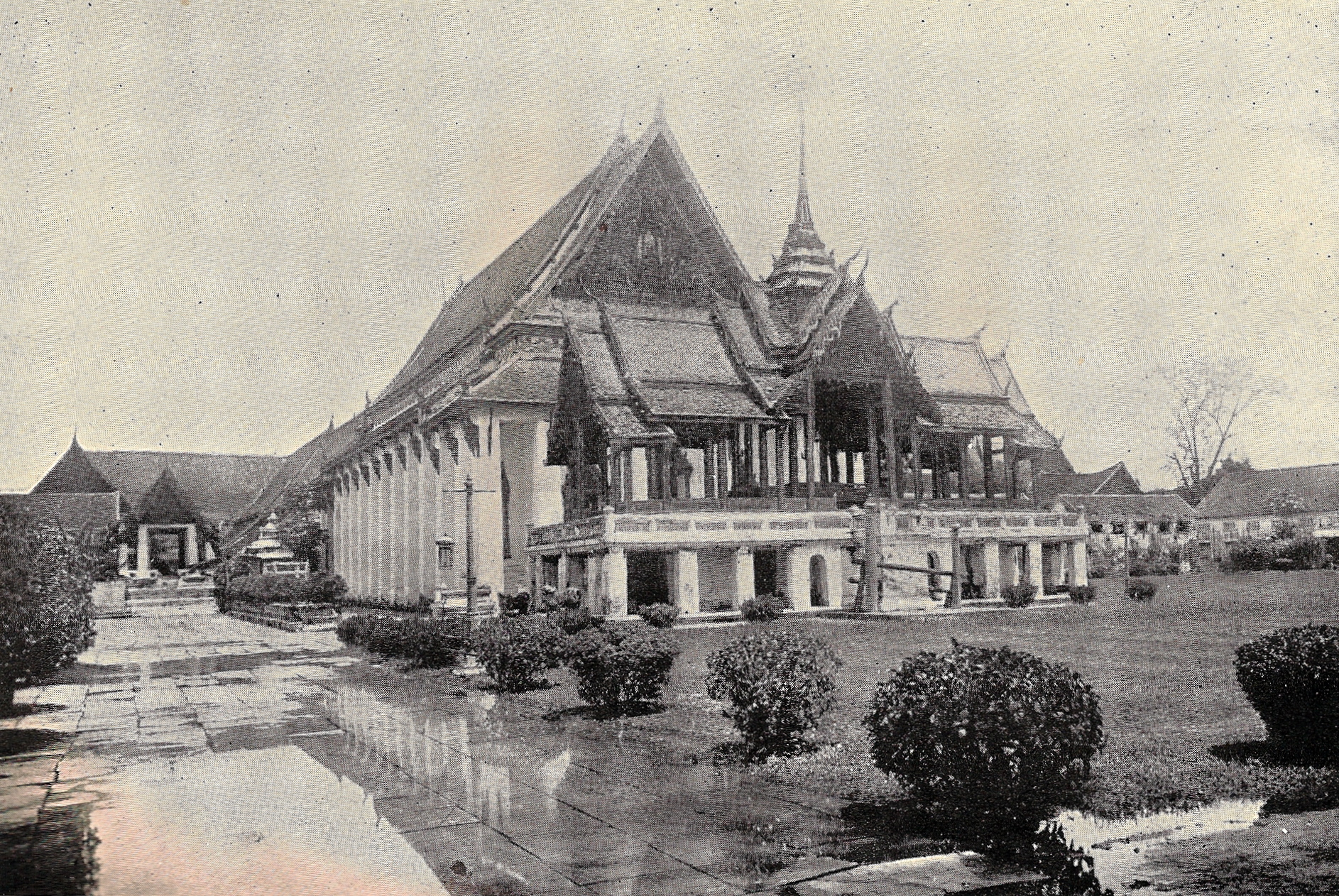
Maha Sura Singhanat, the first Front Palace lord of the Rattanakosin Kingdom, oversaw the initial construction of the palace complex (pictured circa 1890) as his official residence. The grounds now house the Bangkok National Museum.

With the foundation of the Chakri dynasty in 1782, Phutthayotfa Chulalok made his younger brother Bunma the Front Palace (as Maha Sura Singhanat). Maha Sura Singhanat supervised the construction of Front Palace in Bangkok. Later Front Palaces continued the expansion of the palace. Prince Itsarasunthon was the only Front Palace who did not reside in the Front Palace but instead lived at the Thonburi Palace. Ironically, with the exception of Prince Itsarasunthon (who succeeded to the throne as Phutthaloetla Naphalai), none of the Rattanakosin Front Palaces were actually crowned as they were mostly the monarch's siblings. During this time the Vice-King resided in the Front Palace (วังหน้า: Wang Na) north of the Grand Palace, which is now the main building of the Bangkok National Museum.

The Front Palaces during the Rattanakosin period wielded great power, with their own private army and even a navy. In 1851, King Mongkut made his brother Pinklao the Front Palace and then crowned him as a King equal in rank to himself, as was the case of Naresuan and Ekatotsarot. Pinklao also received all the styles and titles usually reserved only for the monarch; to Europeans he referred to himself as the "Second King". In 1868, after the coronation of young Chulalongkorn, his regent Sri Suriwongse arranged the grant of the title of Front Palace to Pinklao's son Prince Yingyot as Front Palace Wichaichan.

Though the office had been superseded, Mahidol Adulyadej, the Prince Father was posthumously given an equivalent rank.

== End to the system ==
The conflicts between the reformist King Chulalongkorn and conservative Vice King came to a head in the so-called Front Palace Crisis in 1874—a fire in the Grand Palace was attributed to the Vice-King Wichaichan, who sought protection in the British consulate. The crisis started due to the fast-paced reforms started by the young King Chulalongkorn. As a result, the reforms were stalled for several years, and when the Vice King died in 1885, the whole Uparat system was abolished by the King. Instead he named his son as heir and Crown Prince.

== List of Front Palace lords ==
=== Ayutthaya ===
Front Palace	Appointed by	Relation to the monarch	Reign	Ascension or Death
Ramesuan	Borommarachathirat II	Son	1438–1448	as Borommatrailokkanat
Chettha	Borommatrailokkanat	Son	1485–1488	as Ramathibodi II
Chettha	Borommarachathirat III	Younger brother	1488–1491	as Ramathibodi II
Athittayawong	Ramathibodi II	Son	1526–1529	as Borommarachathirat IV
Chairacha	Borommarachathirat IV	Younger brother	1529–1533	as Chairachathirat
Chan	Worawongsathirat	Younger brother	1548 (42 days)	Assassinated
Ramesuan	Maha Chakkraphat	Son	1548–1563	Died
Mahin	Maha Chakkraphat	Son	1564–1568	as Mahinthrathirat
Naresuan	Maha Thammaracha	Son	1571–1590	as Sanphet II (Naresuan the Great)
Ekathotsarot	Naresuan the Great	Younger brother	1590–1605	as Sanphet III (Ekathotsarot)
Sutat	Ekathotsarot	Son	1605–1610	Died
Si Sorarak	Songtham	Son	1620 (10 days)	Died
Narai	Si Suthammaracha	Nephew	1656 (2 months 17 days)	as Ramathibodi III (Narai the Great)
Sorasak	Phetracha	Son	1688–1703	as Sanphet VIII (Suriyenthrathibodi)
Phet	Suriyenthrathibodi	Son	1703–1708	as Sanphet IX (Thai Sa)
Phon	Thai Sa	Brother	1708–1732	as Maha Thammarachathirat II (Borommakot)
Senaphithak	Borommakot	Son	1732–1746	Executed
Phonphinit	Borommakot	Son	1757–1758	as Maha Thammarachathirat III (Uthumphon)

=== Thonburi ===
Front Palace	Appointed by	Relation to the monarch	Reign	Ascension or Death
Inthraphithak	Taksin	Son	–1782	Executed

=== Rattanakosin ===
Front Palace	Appointed by	Relation to the monarch	Reign	Ascension or Death
Maha Sura Singhanat	Phutthayotfa Chulalok	Brother	1782–1803	Died
Itsarasunthon	Phutthayotfa Chulalok	Son	1806–1809	as Rama II (Phutthaloetla Naphalai)
Maha Senanurak	Phutthaloetla Naphalai	Brother	1809–1817	Died
Sakdiphonlasep	Nangklao	Uncle	1824–1832	Died
Pinklao	Mongkut	Brother	1851–1866	Crowned as co-ruler with Mongkut
Wichaichan	Chulalongkorn	Cousin	1868–1885	Died, title abolished

With the death of Wichaichan, Chulalongkorn did not appoint any new Front Palaces. In 1886, Chulalongkorn made his son Prince Maha Vajirunhis, "Crown Prince of Siam", therefore abolishing the title of Front Palace altogether.

== See also ==
- Rear Palace—Deputy Viceroy of Siam
- 1924 Palace Law of Succession
- Uparaja—for other Southeast Asian equivalents
- Crown Prince of Thailand
- Chakri Dynasty
- Monarchy of Thailand
- Prince Vajirunhis—first Crown Prince of Siam
