= Bhisadej Rajani =

Thai royal (1922–2022)

Bhisadej Rajani; ภีศเดช รัชนี
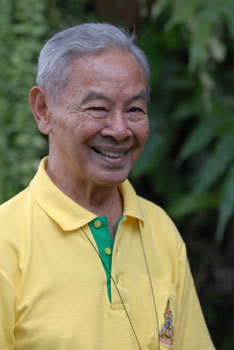
- Prince Bhisadej in 2009
- Born: 20 January 1922; Bangkok, Siam
- Died: 23 July 2022 (aged 100); Bangkok, Thailand
- Spouse: Dajriraj Vorawan
- Issue: Dajrabimala Rajani; Bhavari Rajani; Dhiradej Rajani
- House: Rajani
- Dynasty: Chakri
- Father: Rajani Chamcharas
- Mother: Barabimalabanna Voravan
- Religion: Theravada Buddhism

Prince Bhisadej Rajani (Thai: ภีศเดช รัชนี; RTGS: Phisadet Ratchani; complete title: His Serene Highness Prince (Mom Chao) Bhisadej Rajani) (20 January 1922 – 23 July 2022) was a prince of Thailand, a member of the Thai royal family and a member of the House of Rajani, a royal house which was originated by his father and descends from Chakri Dynasty. He was one of the longest-living royal personages in the Thai history. He was a close friend of the late King Bhumibol Adulyadej, who was also his third-degree cousin (since they both shared a common great-great-grandfather, King Rama II and their great-grandfathers, King Mongkut and Prince Pinklao were brothers, henceforth, King Chulalongkorn and Prince Wichaichan, their respective grandfathers were related as first cousins, which in turn begat their respective fathers, Princes Mahidol Adulyadej and Bidyalongkorn, who were related to each other as second cousins, henceforth, he and the late King and his siblings, the late Princess Galyani Vadhana and the late King Ananda Mahidol as well as the daughter of King Vajiravudh, the late Princess Bejaratana were all related to him as third-degree cousins). In addition, he was also an author and worked as one of the directors of the Royal Project Foundation for the late king.

He was also a great-grandson of Siamese Viceroy, Prince Pinklao, who in turn was one of the sons of King Rama II, a grandson of Prince Wichaichan and one of the grandnephews of King Chulalongkorn as well as one of the nephews to Kings Vajiravudh and Prajadhipok.

== Early life and educations ==
Prince Bhisadej Rajani was born on 20 January 1922. He was the youngest son of Prince Rajani Chamcharas, the Prince of Bidyalongkorn (son of Prince Yodyingyos, the Prince Bovorn Vichaichan) and Mom Chao Barabimalabanna Voravan (daughter of Prince Vorawannakara, the Prince Naradhip Prabandhabongs). He was the great-grandson of the Viceroy Pinklao. He was the younger brother of Princess Vibhavadi Rangsit, Queen Sirikit's lady-in-waiting and well-known royalty author, who was shot down in a helicopter by insurgents while visiting soldiers.

He graduated from Debsirin School and continued his education at Dulwich College in England where he played rugby, tennis, and squash. Running many races a day, young Prince Bhisadej finally won the Victor Ludorum gold medal (Latin for 'winner of the games') at the annual Thai students in the UK meeting. During World War II, he joined the British Army in 1943 as a soldier and British spy. He was trained to walk up the hills with a rifle and heavy back pack. He trekked the Himalayan Mountains for two weeks with an army from Darjeeling Hill Station in India to Nathula Pass in Tibet. After the army training, he engaged the underground resistance movement activities against Japanese called Free Thai Movement during the War. After the war, he came back to Thailand and worked as an officer in the Border Patrol Police in their schools along the northern Thai border for a few years.

== Royal duties ==
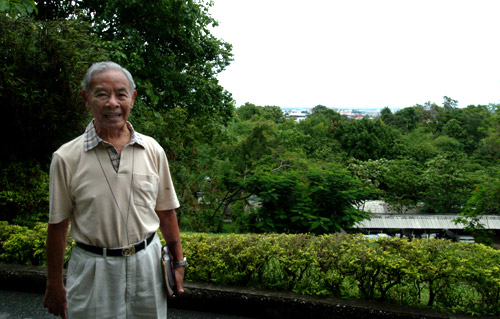
Prince Bhisadej as the President of the Royal Project, Doi Ang Khang, Fang, Chiang Mai.

Prince Bhisadej was a close friend of King Bhumibol Adulyadej since the king held the title Prince during his elder brother's, King Ananda Mahidol, reign. In a 1969 narcotics campaign, during which hill tribe villagers in the northern territory grew opium, King Bhumibol Adulyadej established the Royal Project Foundation centred in Fang District under his command to encourage hill tribes to renounce opium-growing. As president of the organisation, Bhisadej gave advice to them about growing instead cash crops such as strawberries, peaches, plums, as well as vegetables and fruits. He also served as president of the Thai-United Nations Hill-Tribe Economic Development Project and of the Highland Agricultural Research Committee.

== Later life ==
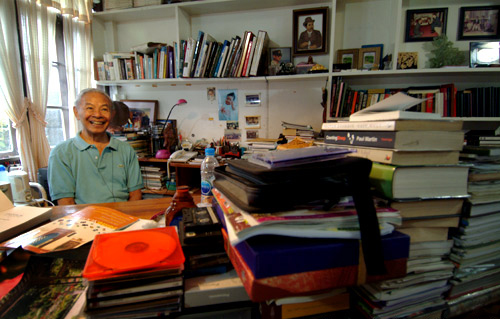
Prince Bhisadej pursuing his hobbies in his office in Pramual Palace, his royal residence in Silom, Bangkok.

While working in Chiang Mai Province, Prince Bhisadej lived a very simple lifestyle. His hobbies were reading, listening to music, and photography. He was fond of photography from the time that he was 14 years old. He enjoyed taking pictures of flowers grown at The Royal Development Centres, particularly English roses at The Royal Agricultural Station Ang Khang, which are in full bloom in April. He enjoyed novels and books about history and rural travels that describe the lives of farmers, especially in France and Spain.

His last book in Thai entitled Cheewit Chun Chun (Thai: ชีวิตชั้น ๆ; RTGS: Chiwit Chan Chan), published in 2002 under the pseudonym P. of Pramualmak (Thai: ภ. ณ ประมวญมารค; RTGS: Pho Na Pramuanmak); the letter P stands for his name when romanised in the RTGS style, Phisadet. His book is autobiographical and also deals with Thai history some 100 years ago.

Prince Bhisadej was respected by Thais for his dedication and long contributions to King Bhumibol Adulyadej's Royal Projects. The prince was frequently invited to preside over academic or international meetings and social events. He turned 100 in January 2022, and died on 23 July, the 77th anniversary of his father's death.

== Marriage ==
Prince Bhisadej married his first cousin, Mom Rajawongse Dajriraj Vorawan, daughter of Mom Chao Nitayakara Vorawan and Mom Kaew Vorawan na Ayudhya. She is the granddaughter of Prince Voravannakara, the Prince Naradhip Prapanpongse, and is the direct niece of Mom Chao Barabimalabanna Voravan, who is Prince Bhisadej's mother.

The couple had two daughters and one son:

- Mom Rajawongse Dajrabimala Rajani
- Mom Rajawongse Bhavari Rajani
- Mom Rajawongse Dhiradej Rajani

The prince and his family resided at Pramual Palace in Silom, Bangkok, but frequently resided at his private residence in the area of The Royal Project Development and Agricultural Centre, Doi Ang Khang, Fang District, Chiang Mai Province.

== Title ==
- Styles of Prince Bhisadej Rajani
- Reference style: His Serene Highness
- Spoken style: Your Serene Highness
- Alternative style: Sir

- His Serene Highness Prince (Mom Chao) Bhisadej Rajani : 20 August 1922 – 23 July 2022

== Honours ==
=== National honours ===
- Knight Grand Cross (First Class) of the Most Illustrious Order of Chula Chom Klao (5 May 1988)
- Knight Grand Cordon (Special Class) of the Most Exalted Order of the White Elephant (2005)
- Knight Grand Cordon (Special Class) of the Most Noble Order of the Crown of Thailand (2004)
- King Rama IX Royal Cypher Medal, 3rd Class (1954)
- King Rama X Royal Cypher Medal, 1st Class (2019)
- King Rama X Court Medal (1960)

=== Foreign honours ===
- Denmark:
  - Commander 1st Class of the Order of the Dannebrog (2001)

== Ancestry ==
Ancestors of Prince (Mom Chao) Bhisadej Rajani
Prince Bhisadej Rajani	Father: Prince Rajani Chamcharas, the Prince Bidyalongkorn	Paternal Grandfather: Prince Yodyingyos, the Prince Bowon Wichaichan	Paternal Great-grandfather: Pinklao, Viceroy of Siam
Prince Bhisadej Rajani	Father: Prince Rajani Chamcharas, the Prince Bidyalongkorn	Paternal Grandfather: Prince Yodyingyos, the Prince Bowon Wichaichan	Paternal Great-grandmother: Chao Chom Manda Em
Prince Bhisadej Rajani	Father: Prince Rajani Chamcharas, the Prince Bidyalongkorn	Paternal Grandmother: Chao Chom Manda Liamlek	Paternal Great-grandfather: unknown
Prince Bhisadej Rajani	Father: Prince Rajani Chamcharas, the Prince Bidyalongkorn	Paternal Grandmother: Chao Chom Manda Liamlek	Paternal Great-grandmother: unknown
Prince Bhisadej Rajani	Mother: Mom Chao Barabimalabanna Voravan	Maternal Grandfather: Prince Voravannakara, the Prince Naradhip Prabandhabongs	Maternal Great-grandfather: Mongkut, King Rama IV of Siam
Prince Bhisadej Rajani	Mother: Mom Chao Barabimalabanna Voravan	Maternal Grandfather: Prince Voravannakara, the Prince Naradhip Prabandhabongs	Maternal Great-grandmother: Chao Chom Manda Khien
Prince Bhisadej Rajani	Mother: Mom Chao Barabimalabanna Voravan	Maternal Grandmother: Mom Phun Vorawan na Ayudhya	Maternal Great-grandfather: unknown
Prince Bhisadej Rajani	Mother: Mom Chao Barabimalabanna Voravan	Maternal Grandmother: Mom Phun Vorawan na Ayudhya	Maternal Great-grandmother: unknown
