= Mi krop =

Thai dish

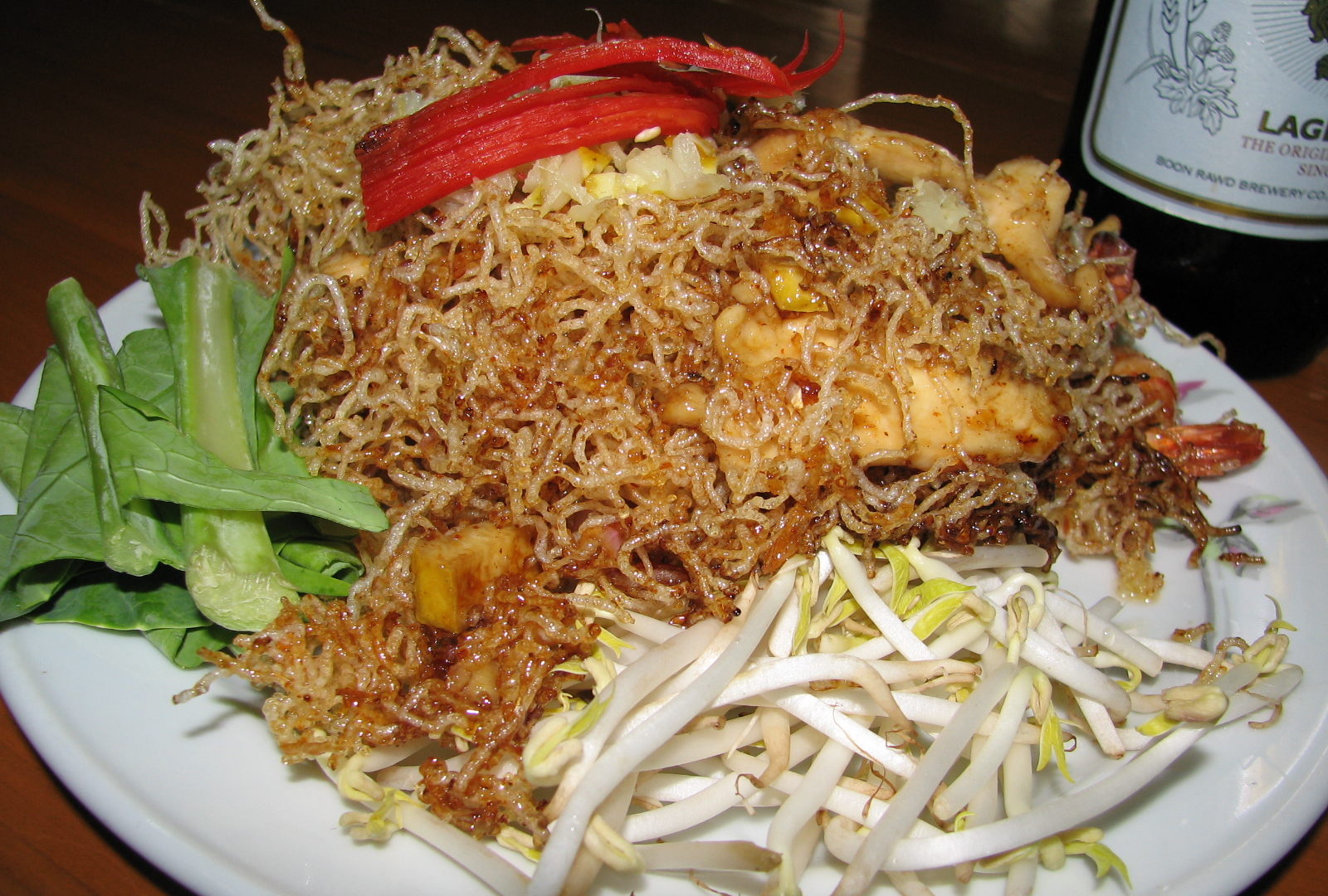
- Mi krop from Chotechitr, another restaurant renowned for traditional Thai cuisine in the Sam Phraeng area
- Alternative names: Mi krop sawoei sawan (หมี่กรอบเสวยสวรรค์; lit. 'crisp noodles to god') name given by King Rama V Mi krop ror ha (หมี่กรอบ ร.5; lit. 'Rama V's crisp noodles')
- Type: Noodle
- Place of origin: Thailand
- Region or state: Southeast Asia
- Associated cuisine: Thailand
- Main ingredients: Rice noodles, sauce

Mi krop (Thai: หมี่กรอบ, pronounced [mìː krɔ̀ːp]), also spelled mee krob, is a Thai dish consisting of deep-fried rice vermicelli noodles with a sweet and sour sauce. Mi krop means "crisp noodles". The citrusy, sour note in the sauce often comes from the peel of som sa, a Thai citrus fruit similar to citron.

== History ==
A legend claims that King Rama V visited the people by boat in the Talad Phlu area and smelled the noodles that a Chinese immigrant named "Chin Li" (จีนหลี) was stir-frying at that time. He stopped the boat, ate it, and very much liked it. This led to the dish receiving another name: Mi krop ror ha.

In Bangkok, there are at least two restaurants famous for Mi krop. One is Chin Li Restaurant, also known as Tek Heng, in Talad Phlu on the Thon Buri side, directly connected to the original legend of Chin Li's noodles, and the other is Mit Ko Yuan in Phra Nakhon, near the Giant Swing and Bangkok City Hall.

== Ingredients ==
The dish consists of crispy fried thin rice noodles mixed with fried tofu, fried shrimp, pork, or a combination, and sauced with a mixture of lemon or lime juice, fish sauce, tomato paste, kaffir lime leaves, chili, and sugar. The dish can be garnished with scallions, bean sprouts, cilantro, chili, and fried egg strips.

== In popular culture ==
The dish was mentioned by Carrie Bradshaw in an episode of Sex and the City. It is listed as one of several items Sheldon Cooper from The Big Bang Theory gets on The Gang's weekly Thai food night. Eric Cartman mentions it in the South Park episode "It Hits the Fan", and expresses a strong dislike for it.
