= Front Palace Crisis =

Political crisis in Siam (1874–1875)

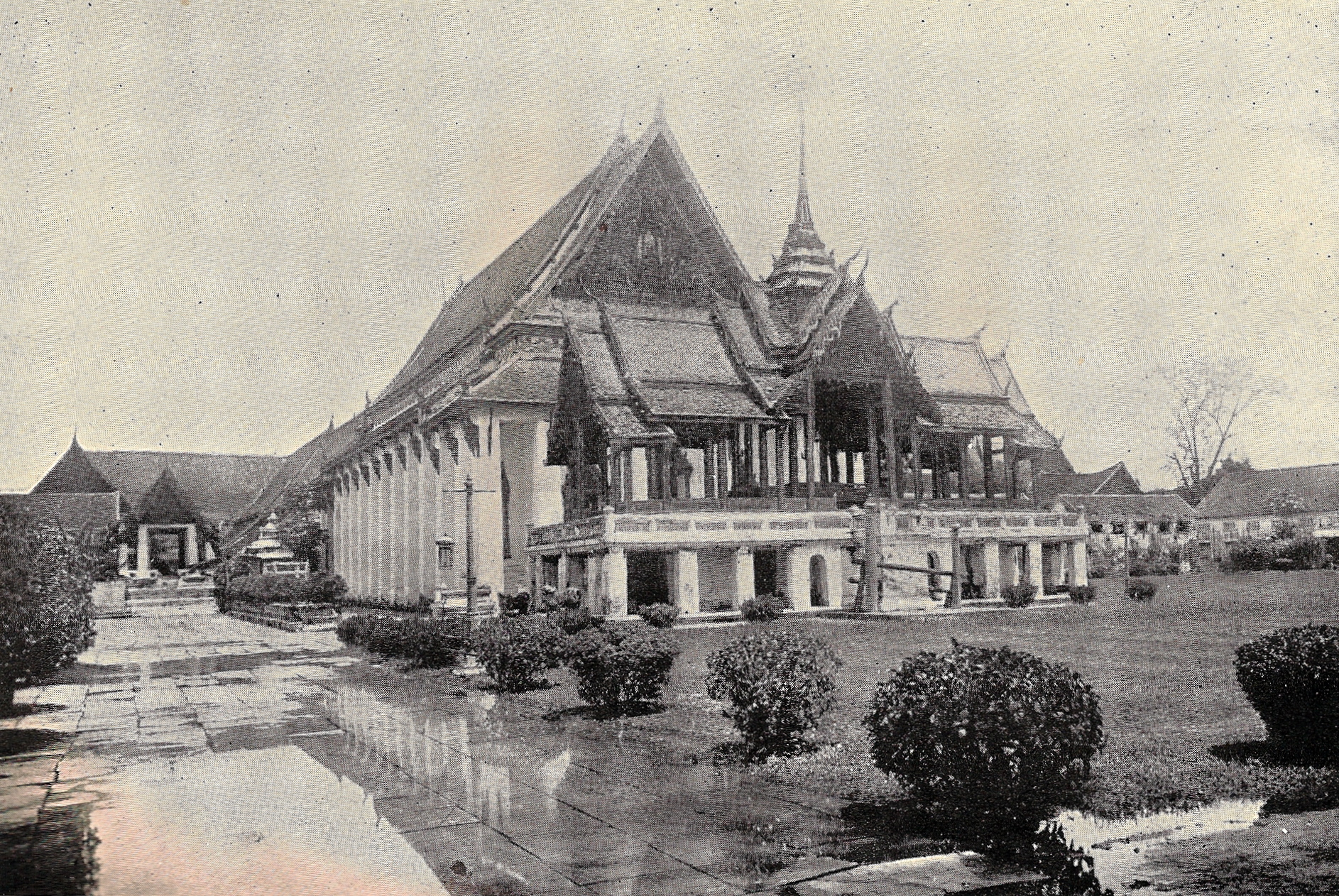
Photograph of the Front Palace or Wang Na (circa 1890) now the Bangkok National Museum.

The Front Palace Crisis or the Front Palace incident (Thai: วิกฤตการณ์วังหน้า) (Wang Na crisis) was a political crisis that took place in the Kingdom of Siam from 28 December 1874 to 24 February 1875 (93 of the Rattanakosin Era). The crisis was a power struggle between the reformist King Chulalongkorn (Rama V) and the conservative Prince Bovorn Vichaichan, the Vice King. Chulalongkorn came to the throne in 1868, with Vichaichan appointed Front Palace or Vice King in the same year.

The progressive reforms of King Chulalongkorn aroused the ire of Prince Vichaichan and the nobility, who saw their power and influence being slowly eroded. A fire in the Grand Palace led to an open confrontation between the two factions, prompting Vichaichan to flee to the British Consulate. The stalemate was finally resolved with the presence of Sir Andrew Clarke, the Governor of the Straits Settlements, who supported the king over his cousin. The Front Palace was afterwards stripped of its power, and after Vichaichan's death in 1885 the title was abolished.

== Prelude ==
=== Vichaichan ===
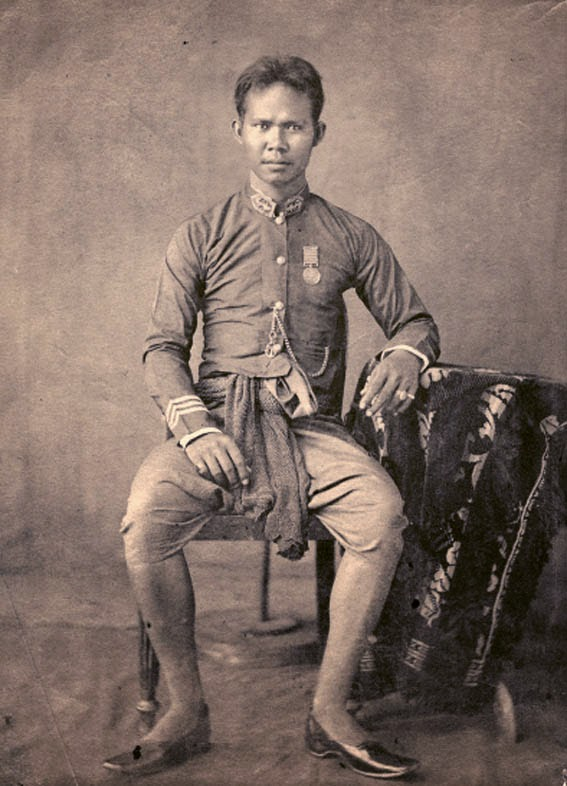
Prince Bovorn Vichaichan - called George Washington by foreigners - was appointed Vice King in 1868.

Since the elevation of Vice King Pinklao by his brother King Mongkut (Rama IV) twenty years earlier, the office of Front Palace had gained a considerable amount of power and prestige. Since Siam did not have a law of succession, the position of Vice King was seen as the strongest claimant and was therefore also the position of the heir presumptive to the throne. The Vice King also had his own army of over 2,000 men, Western-trained and Western-armed. He also controlled a naval forces of several steam-powered gunboats. The Prince also had a large share of state revenues over one-third of which is given directly to him for the maintenance of his officials, retinue, court, concubines and advisors.

In August 1868 King Mongkut contracted malaria whilst on an expedition to see a solar eclipse in Prachuap Khiri Khan province, dying six weeks later on 1 October. The young Chulalongkorn, who was only 15 years old at the time, was unanimously declared king by a council of high-ranking nobility, princes of the Chakri dynasty and monks. The council was presided over by Si Suriyawongse who was also appointed Regent for the young King.

During the meeting when one of the Princes nominated Prince Yodying Prayurayot Krom Muen Bovorn Vichaichan as the next Front Palace, many in the council objected. The most notable objection of this nomination came from Prince Vorachak Tharanubhab. The Prince argued that the appointment of such an important position was the sole prerogative of the king and not of the council, and that the council should wait until the king was old enough to appoint his own. Furthermore, the position was not hereditary and the appointment of the son of the former could set a dangerous precedent. The nomination of Vichaichan however was supported by the powerful Regent Chao Phraya Si Suriyawongse (Chuang Bunnag) who wanted to secure a line of succession by appointing an able and experienced Vice King (as the first-in-line to the throne). Si Suriyawongse was determined, he retorted by accusing the Prince of wanting to be appointed himself, saying: "You don't agree. Is it because you want to be (Uparaja) yourself?" ("ที่ไม่ยอมนั้น อยากจะเป็นเองหรือ"). The Prince replied wearily "If you want me to agree then I agree" ("ถ้าจะให้ยอมก็ต้องยอม"). As a result, Prince Vichaichan, at the age of 30, was appointed Front Palace (Krom Phra Rajawang Bovorn Sathan Mongkol) and Second King without the full consent of the incoming monarch. The relationship between Chulalongkorn and the Vichaichan would remain difficult for the rest of the latter's life, based on this fact. On 11 November 1868 Vichaichan's cousin Chulalongkorn was crowned Supreme King of Siam at the Grand Palace.

=== Chulalongkorn ===
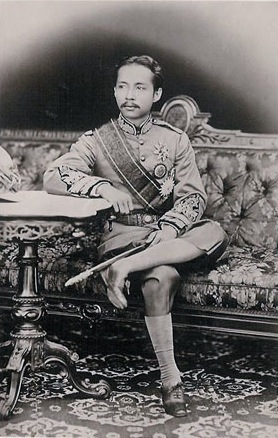
A young King Chulalongkorn (Rama V).

On 20 September 1873 King Chulalongkorn formally reached his majority at the age of 20, resulting in the dissolution of the regency of Si Suriyawongse. During the five years of the regency, Vichaicharn decided to limit his role and power out of reverence for the Regent, who arranged for his appointment. With the dissolution of the regency, Vichaichan was ready to reassert the powers of his office. Unfortunately, Chulalongkorn and his brothers (the Young Siam group) were at the same time trying to consolidate his own authority and return to the Grand Palace the power it had lost since the death of his father. Spurred on by their Western education, Young Siam was intent on creating a centralized and strong nation under an absolute monarch. To achieve this goal, Chulalongkorn needed to implement radical reforms in all parts of the Royal Government.

In 1873 the king established the 'Auditing Office' (หอรัษฎากรพิพัฒน์, now the Ministry of Finance). It was created to modernize and simplify the collection of state revenues and taxes to the treasury. At the same time, however, it deprived the control of nobility (as landowners) over tax farms, which for generations had constituted a large part of their income. The following years the king by Royal Decree created the 'Privy Council of Siam' (สภากรรมการองคมนตรี). Copied from the European tradition, the council was an effort by the king to shore up his own legitimacy and to create an elite he could rely on. In their inauguration speeches, the forty-eight councilors pledged allegiance to the monarch and his heirs.

These reforms infuriated the conservative faction at court, the Old Siam composed mainly of old aristocratic families, as the financial reforms eroded some of their old privileges. Politically the creation of the Privy Council meant that only royal favourites had access to political offices, depriving the old families of their influences. This group included Vichaichan, whose role in the finance and the government of the kingdom was slowly being eroded. Conflict between the opposing sides seemed inevitable. Vichaichan had the support of the British Consul-General to Siam, Thomas George Knox. He was originally recruited by Pinklao to modernize the Front Palace's armed forces. After Mongkut's death, Knox greatly preferred the mature and experienced Vichaichan — who was also the son of one of the most westernized member of the elite to ascend the throne — over the young, unknown and radical Chulalongkorn.

== Crisis ==
=== Fire within the Grand Palace ===
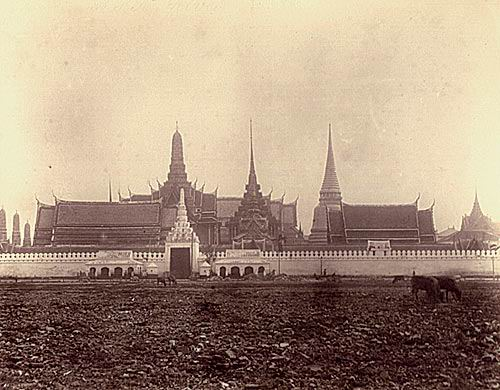
Photograph of the Grand Palace, with the Sanam Luang in the foreground.

In early December 1874, Vichaichan received an anonymous letter threatening his life. In response he mobilized up to 600 troops and quartered them within his own palace. As tensions grew, King Chulalongkorn also mobilized his own troops. However, this underlined the fact that the Front Palace's guards both outnumbered and were better equipped than the King's men, besides creating great unease and tension between the two kings. On the night of 28 December, a mysterious fire broke out after a small explosion within the walls of the Grand Palace. The fire quickly spread and was in danger of consuming the King's own residential halls and the Temple of the Emerald Buddha itself.

The Front Palace guards immediately set off from their quarters to help extinguish the fire. However, they were turned away by the suspicious Royal guards, who suspected the fire was started by the Front Palace as an excuse to enter the Grand Palace under false pretense. Fortunately, the fire was soon extinguished. Vichaichan had remained in his palace instead of leading his men to the Grand Palace. This was contrary to ancient custom, which dictated that he must take an active role in defending the Royal compound and the king in any situation. Using this as his pretext, Chualongkorn ordered his guards to surround to the Front Palace compound in attempt to contain the situation.

Once the confrontation began, Chulalongkorn and his ministers agreed immediately that the only person with enough clout to settle the crisis was the ex-regent Si Suriyawongse, who was in Ratchaburi province west of Bangkok. The king commented privately that he was being forced to "Swim to the crocodile". This demonstrated that the king was still incapable of asserting his will over the nobility, and needed the help of others to rule. Si Suriyawongse took immediate action, seeing an opportunity to redress the balance of power between the king and Vichaichan and perhaps increase his own influences. First, he advised the king to strip Vichaichan of the rank of Vice King but allow him to keep the title of Front Palace. At the same time he wrote, hinting to the acting Consul-General a Mr. Newman (Knox having returned to England earlier that year) that given the situation, he should send a British gunboat to protect British lives and interests. The Royal Navy steam frigate HMS Charybdis was immediately despatched from Singapore to the Chao Phraya river for this purpose. Lastly, he wrote to Prince Vichaichan, hinting that Chulalongkorn favoured his execution as punishment for the crisis, when in fact Chulalongkorn only wanted to curb the Front Palace's power over men and weapons. This gave Si Suriyawongse the power to mediate between the factions in the crisis to boost his own control.

=== Escape to the Consulate ===
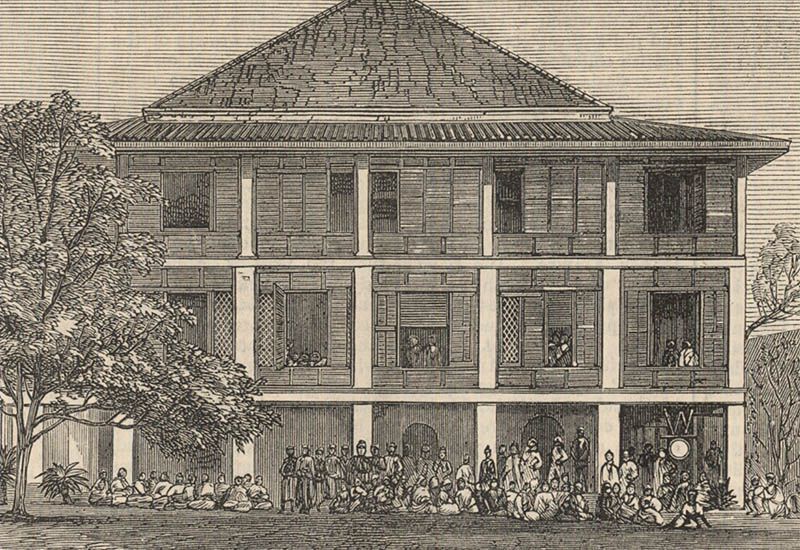
The events at the British Consulate, as depicted in The Illustrated London News

In the early hours of 2 January 1875, Vichaichan fled his palace to seek refuge in the British Consulate (south of Phra Nakhon, in Bang Kho Laem) and under protection and support of the British Government. Vichaichan was immediately condemned by a council of high officials (convened by Si Suriyawongse), a resolution was written accusing the Prince of seeking foreign intervention in an internal dispute at the expense of national sovereignty and royal authority. Chulalongkorn intervened before the document could be passed, by suggesting simply that they should try to invite the Front Palace to return instead. Vichaichan refused reconciliation and remained in the British Consulate with the support of both British and French representatives.

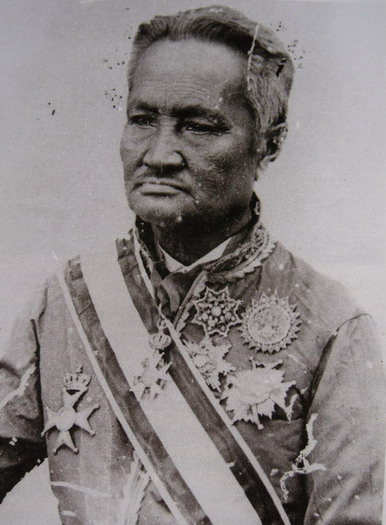
Somdet Chao Phraya Si Suriyawongse, a member of the powerful Bunnag family, served as Samuha Kalahom or Prime Minister from 1855 to 1869 and as Regent from 1868 to 1873.

The king followed Si Suriyawongse's advice by having his ministers offer Vichaichan amnesty. As punishment he must relinquish the title of Vice King, but again Vichaichan refused. As a counter offer Vichaichan wanted to keep his men and his revenues, with the British and the French acting as guarantors on these terms. Because of the last item the offer was rejected by the council of the nobility and the King. As 'guarantors' the two prolific colonialists (the British to the west and the French to the east) would see it as their right to intervene in future Siamese domestic affairs. After much discussion both Chulalongkorn and Vichaichan were pressured by Si Suriyawongse to compromise, however no agreement could be reached.

The crisis remained unresolved mostly due to the warm support given to Vichaichan by the Acting-Consul Newman and his staff. Vichaichan thus waited for British intervention and refused all reconciliation with Chulalongkorn. After the crisis reached stalemate, Si Suriyawongse advised the consulate to seek assistance by inviting an influential person to intervene. On 5 January, Newman contacted the Governor of the Straits Settlements Sir Andrew Clarke to Bangkok, presumably to mediate. Chulalongkorn himself had earlier written to Clarke at the beginning of the crisis in an effort to rally foreign support for himself. Clarke as it turned out was very sympathetic to the King's reforms and situation. The king and Clarke had personally met in 1873, when the king had his second coronation after receiving his majority. During that trip Clarke was extremely impressed with the young King's zeal for reform and his modern attitudes, particularly his abolition of the prostration and crawling required by subjects in the presence of the King. Clarke immediately requested instructions from London, pointing out that if Britain did not intervene then France would. The Colonial Secretary Lord Carnarvon quickly directed Clarke to go to Bangkok as soon as possible, for as Newman reported:"There is little likelihood of a settlement being effected, and trade and commerce are in a great measure stopped".

=== Arrival of Clarke ===
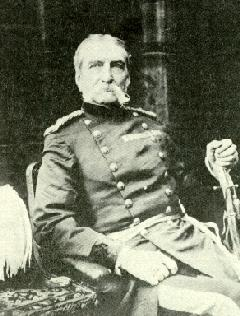
Sir Andrew Clarke, Governor of the Straits Settlements, in office from 1873 to 1875. As a result of their correspondence the king and Clarke became lifelong friends.

When Clarke arrived in Bangkok on 18 February on HMS Valiant (commanded by Admiral Alfred Ryder), Newman came on board to report that there has been no change in the situation. It was clear that Newman and the Consul's staff were on the side of Vichaichan and had wanted to support him against the King. They suggested to Clarke that Vichaichan should be sent to British Burma for his own safety. On 20 February Chulalongkorn formally gave audience to Clarke at the Grand Palace; the meeting took over three hours. During the meeting Clarke assured the king that he had no intention of interfering in the dynastic conflict of the House of Chakri, but he was determined to reaffirm the King's power over the Kingdom's finances and military against that of Vichaichan's powers. The Governor asked the king to dictate his terms in full. The king also gave reassurance to Clarke that he had no wish to harm Vichaichan, and displayed a conciliatory disposition towards his royal cousin. Afterwards the king asked Clarke to put the terms on paper.

After dining with Si Suriyawongse on board the Valiant, the Governor gave the 70-year-old ex-Regent a lecture on sowing dissension in the royal family and "the duty of thinking of his country before everything". He also called a meeting between the different consuls in Bangkok to put before them his plan of reconciliation between the two 'Kings'. He assured them that the terms offered by Chulalongkorn must be accepted and that it was in the interests of the commerce of all countries for the crisis to end. The consuls unanimously agreed with him.

Vichaichan meanwhile had also requested a meeting with Clarke by sending him a letter of welcome. Clarke, who has been purposefully avoiding the Vice King, asked for permission from Chulalongkorn before any contact would be made. After he received Chulalongkorn's permission, the Governor' asked Vichaichan to send a letter laying out his case, Vichaichan wrote that: "Some foolish men, wishing to change the customs and usages of the country, has turned the king against him."' The King, Governor Clarke and Admiral Ryder met again at the home of the American missionary Reverend J.H. Chandler, whose service as a translator was needed in the final document. The document itself ended with words from Chulalongkorn to Vichaichan: "I beg you, who sign these Articles of Reconciliation, to have Full faith in me that I will assuredly devise no mischief whatever to Krom Phra Rachawang [Vichaichan], which would be unjust, and I will keep to these Articles in every respect."

On the evening of 24 February, Clarke and Ryder dined at the British Consulate, finally meeting with Vichaichan. The Governor put before him the terms of the offer. After much complaint the humiliated Vichaichan was forced to accept Chulalongkorn's terms in full. He had come to realize that these were the most favourable terms he could hope to receive and that the hospitality of the British was finite. That evening Chulalongkorn wrote to Clarke: "My good Friend, My private secretary has reported his conversation with Your Excellency. I am glad to agree that my cousin shall return to his palace quietly in the early morning, and come to me at eleven o'clock, when, as I must meet the wishes of my own people, I think it better that only Siamese should be present at our reconciliation, Your faithful friend, Chulalonkorn Rex" After spending a day and a night as guests of the king at the Grand Palace, Clarke and his company returned to Singapore.

== Aftermath ==
The final agreement stripped Vichaichan of the title of Vice King, although he retained the title and office of Front Palace. He was allowed to keep 200 guards of small weaponry. From then on the king also had a monopoly on all ships, weapons and ammunition. The king also pledged to guarantee and take responsibility for Vichaichan's financial rights and interests once he had: "placed the Finances of Our Kingdom on a more secure and firmer basis, so as to [...] prevent the waste of our resources." The agreement greatly reduced the powers of Vichaichan, and also deprived the nobility and the conservatives of a leader who could really challenge the king and his reforms.

After the crisis Vichaichan was consigned to his palace and his role in the administration of the Kingdom ceased to exist. The crisis also led to the decline of Si Suriyawongse, who quietly withdrew from politics and retired after the crisis ended, and to a large extent the nobility and the Bunnags themselves. The crisis also brought the end to the councils of the nobility — from then on only those in the Privy Council were given any role in the administration of the kingdom. The ignominious ending of the dependent relationship between the king and his nobles meant that from then on all ministers of state, high-ranking military and government officials were drawn not from the nobility but almost exclusively from the House of Chakri (primarily of Chulalongkorn's own brothers), a situation that was not rectified until 1932.

Although his power and authority for the first time since his coronation was unchallenged, Chulalongkorn and Young Siam decided to slow down and at times suspend their reforms altogether. Writing to Clarke a year later that he had decided: "to defer the prosecution of further plans of reform until I shall find some demand for them among the leaders of my people. I have not relinquished them, but act, according to my opportunities." The terms of his agreement with Vichaichan were kept until the latter's death.

== Abolition of the Front Palace ==
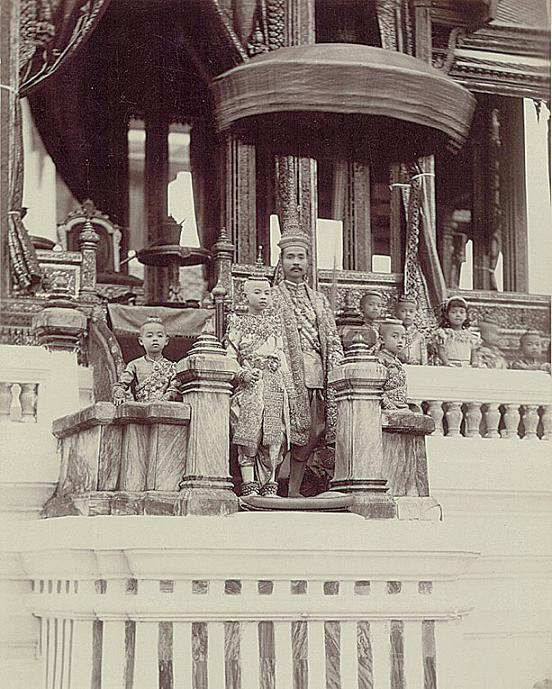
Chulalongkorn in ceremonial dress with his son Crown Prince Maha Vajirunhis at the Grand Palace in 1890.

Vichaichan died on 28 August 1885 at the age of 47. After his death the office of Front Palace was left vacant until 14 January 1886, when Chulalongkorn's son with Princess Consort Savang Vadhana was made Crown Prince Maha Vajirunhis or Somdet Phra Boromma-orasathirat Sayam Makutrajakuman. The title of Front Palace, the heir presumptive to the throne first created in 1688 by King Petracha of Ayutthaya was thus abolished and replaced with an heir apparent, whose succession is to be based on the principle of male primogeniture. The new invented title brought Siamese succession in line with European tradition. Prince Bovorn Vichaichan was cremated with great ceremony on the field of Sanam Luang on 14 June 1886.

The Front Palace compound itself was partly demolished. The parts that remain were given to Vichaichan's consorts, daughters and sisters as residences (his sons were excluded). Today all that remains make up the main buildings of the Bangkok National Museum. Lands from the demolished parts were given to the new Royal Siamese Army (which was founded in 1874 and benefitted from the merger of the troops of the Front Palace to that of the Grand Palace) as barracks and to the ministries of the new government. The Front Palace navy was also merged to that of the Grand Palace's to form the Royal Siamese Navy in 1887.

== See also ==
- Front Palace, Bangkok – History of the royal residence
- Front Palace – History of the title
- Si Suriyawongse
- Vajirunhis
- Crown Prince of Thailand
- Rattanakosin Kingdom
