= Sam Phraeng =

Neighbourhood in Bangkok

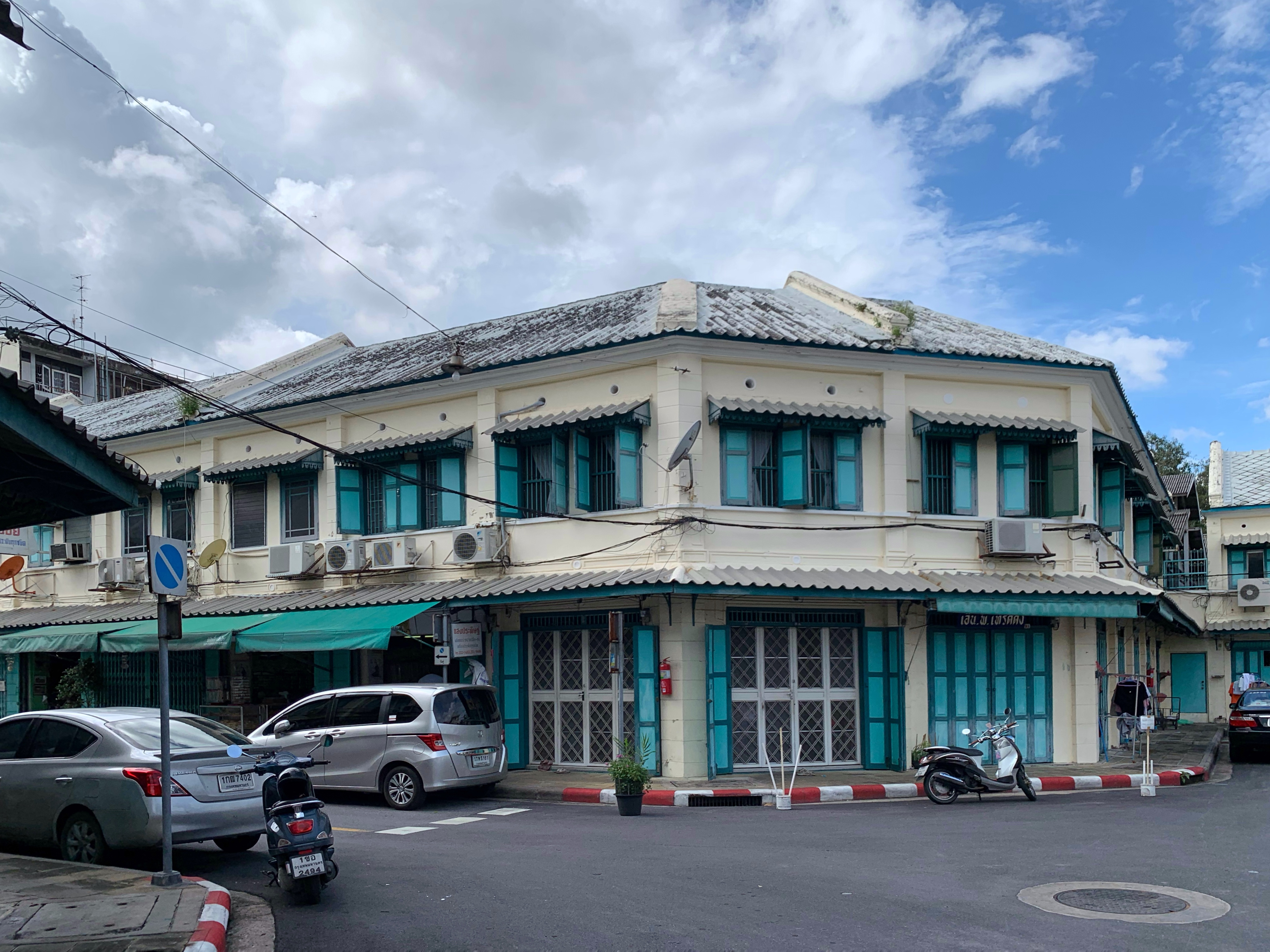
Iconic shophouses in Phreang Phuthon

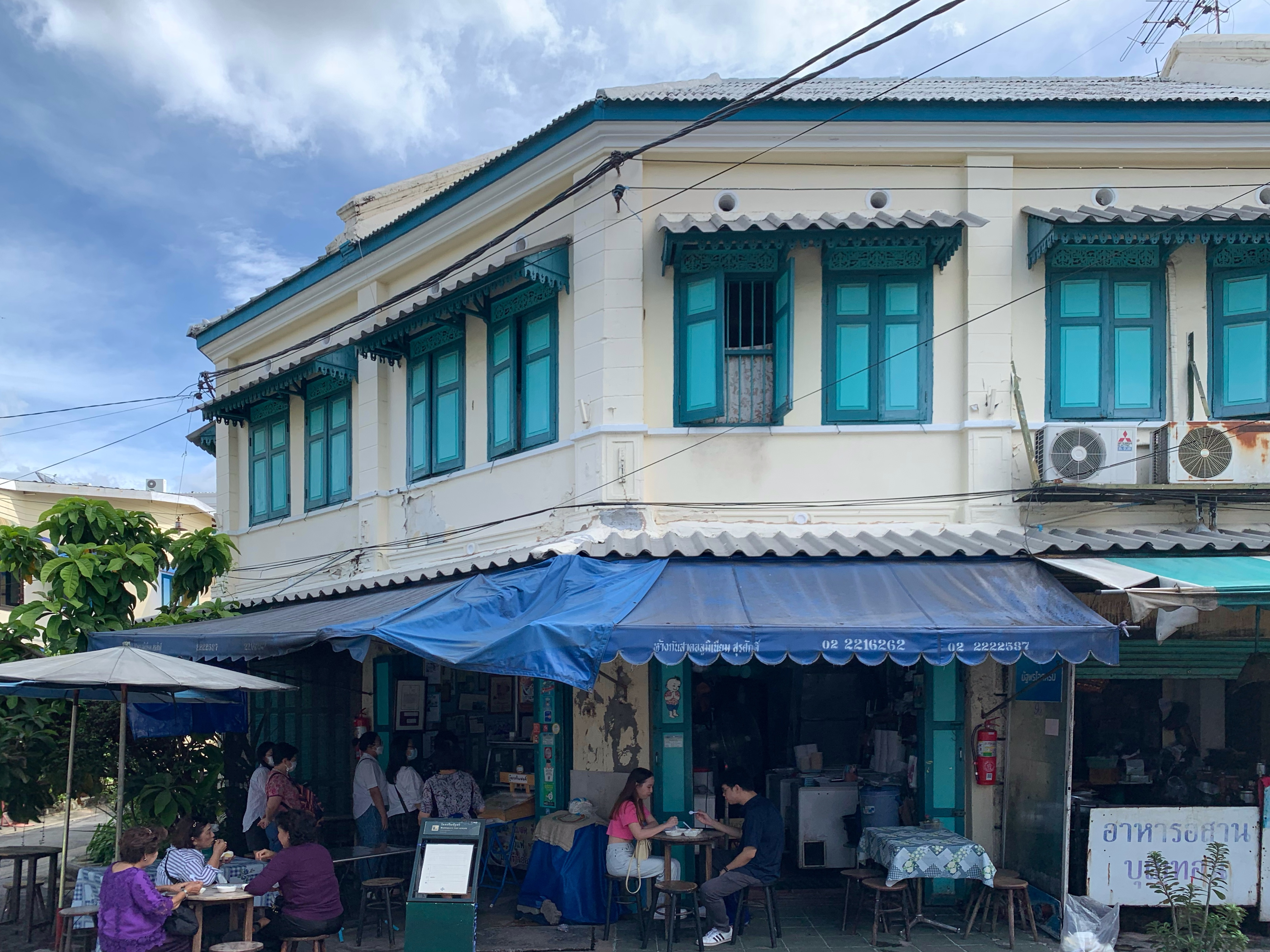
The Louis Vuitton City Guide recommended Nathhaporn Ice Cream, one such delicacy in the area

Sam Phraeng (Thai: สามแพร่ง, pronounced [sǎːm pʰrɛ̂ŋ]), also spelled as Sam Praeng, is the name of a neighbourhood that is historic area in Rattanakosin Island, San Chaopho Suea Sub-District, Phra Nakhon District, Bangkok. It is an area in the middle between Atsadang (run through Pak Khlong Talad to Sanam Luang) and Tanao Roads (run through Si Kak Sao Chingcha to Bang Lamphu). In addition, it is considered in the same neighbourhood as other landmarks, such as Sao Chingcha, San Chao Pho Suea, Wat Suthat, Wat Ratchabophit, Ministry of Defense, Saphan Chang Rong Si, etc.

The term Sam Phraeng in Thai generally means "three-way intersection", which according to ancient Thai beliefs, are the path that the ghost or various spirits used as the path through, therefore is an inauspicious place and no one dares to build houses for living. The name is derived from three soi (alleyways), which were the location of palaces of three princes, namely Phraeng Phuthon, Phraeng Nara and Phraeng Sanphasat respectively.

Nowadays, especially at Phraeng Phuthon and Phraeng Nara, the small shophouses mostly built during the reign of King Chulalongkorn remain beautiful as an epitome of Sino-Portuguese style. Moreover, this neighbourhood is also known as the center of the well-known restaurants and many delicacies such as Cantonese noodles, beef noodles, grilled pork meatballs, cafés, milk cafés, rad na and pork satay, pad thai and mee krob from Chotechitr, kai yang, yen ta fo, mango sticky rice from Kor Panich, popiah and barbecued red pork in sweet gravy with rice, Thai style ice cream and rare traditional Chinese cuisine, pig's brain soup.

== Phraeng Phuthon ==
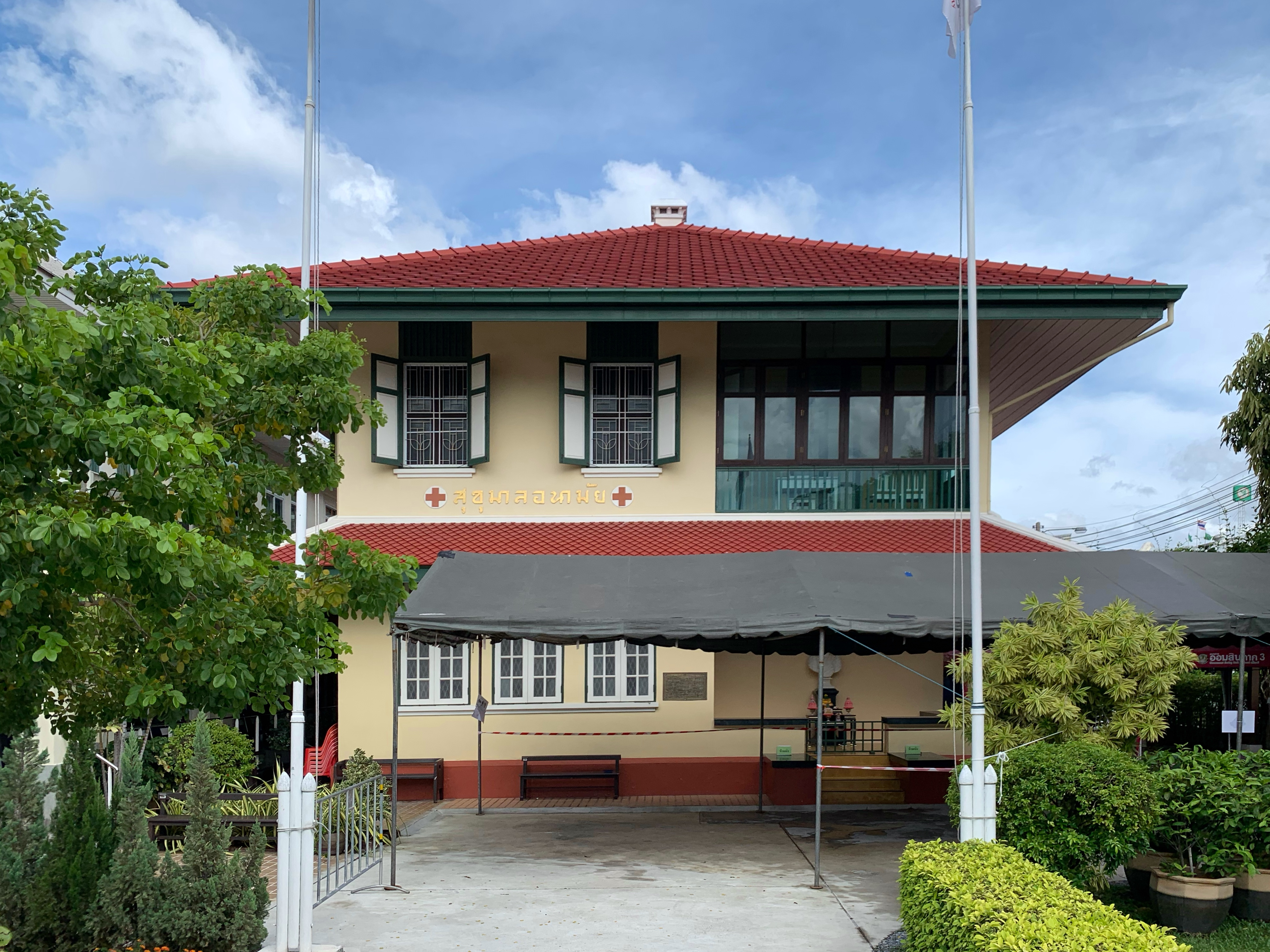
Sukhumala Anamai (now a Thai Red Cross Station)

Phraeng Phuthon (แพร่งภูธร) was named after Prince Thawee Thawalai (พระองค์เจ้าทวีถวัลยลาภ; later named as Prince Phuthon Phuthareth Thamrongsak–พระเจ้าบรมวงศ์เธอ พระองค์เจ้าทวีถวัลยลาภ กรมหมื่นภูธเรศธำรงศักดิ์), the origin of the royal family surname Thaweewong. He was the son of King Mongkut (Rama IV) and the Royal Concubine Talab (เจ้าจอมมารดาตลับ). He served as Commander in Chief of Metropolitan Ministry. His residence was at the corner of Si Kak Sao Ching Cha, on Ban Tanao Road (now Tanao Road). After his death in 1894, the palace was sold to King Chulalongkorn (Rama V). The king graciously ordered the building of shophouses and cut a road through the palace, named after the former owner, Phraeng Phuthon. At present there is a public health station under Thai Red Cross Society named "Sukhumala Anamai" (สุขุมาลอนามัย), built in 1928 (before Siamese revolution four years) according to Queen Sukhumala Marasri's wishes, and still operate. And the center point is small public park for leisure and activities of locals. 13°45′07.3″N 100°29′51.3″E

== Phraeng Nara ==
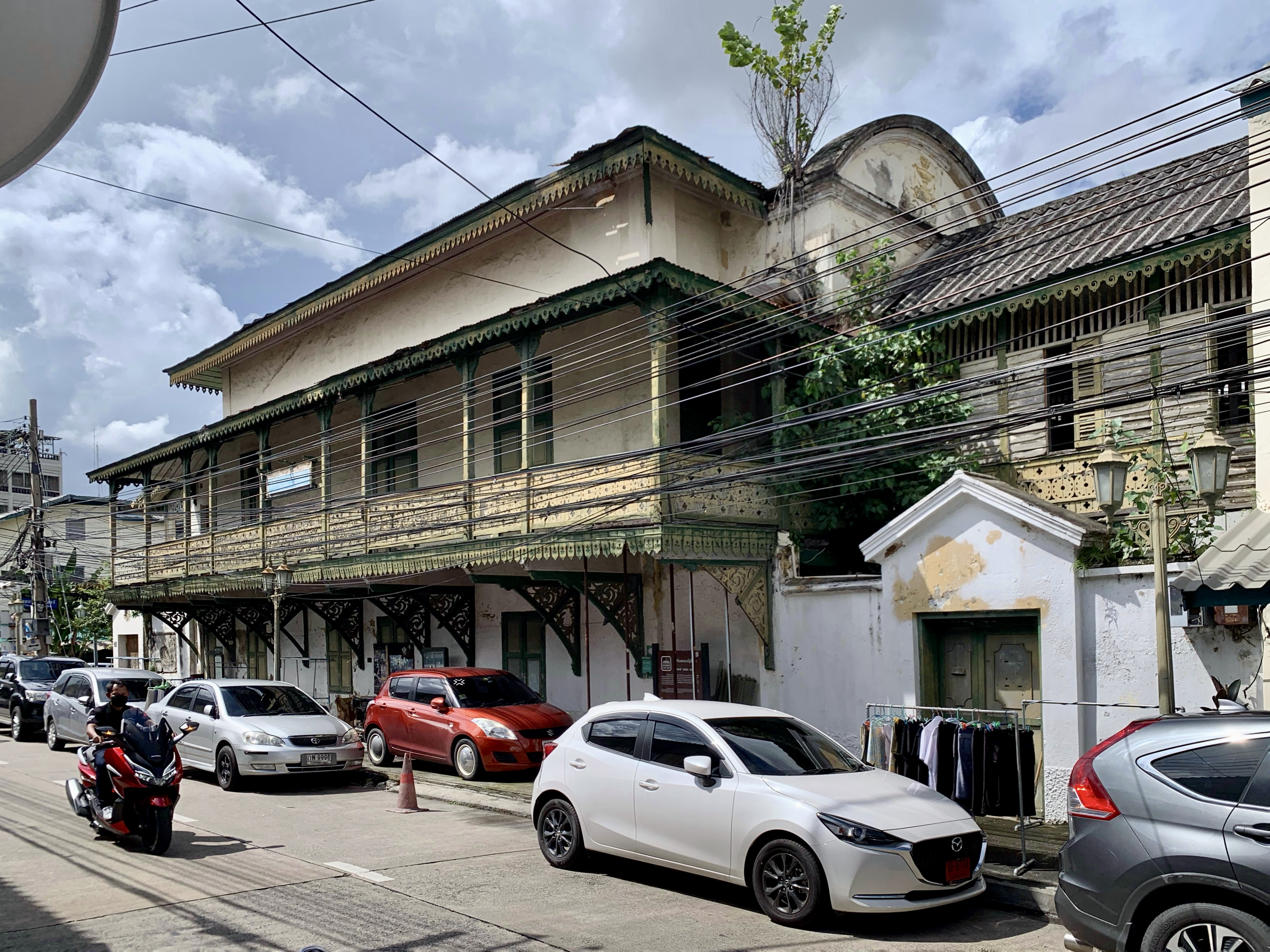
Worawan Palace or the former residence of Prince Narathip Praphanphong, the namesake of this phraeng

Phraeng Nara (แพร่งนรา) was named after Prince Narathip Praphanphong (พระเจ้าบรมวงศ์เธอ พระองค์เจ้าวรวรรณากร กรมพระนราธิปประพันธ์พงศ์) whose name at birth was Prince Worawannakon (พระองค์เจ้าวรวรรณากร), the origin of the royal family surname Worawan na Ayudhya. He was a son of King Mongkut and the Royal Concubine Kean (เจ้าจอมมารดาเขียน). He served in the Department of Treasury as the deputy chief. He resided at the palace where his father, the King, built on Tanao Road. The palace is known locally as Worawan Palace (วังวรวรรณ) which was connected to the palace of Prince Thawi Thawalai. While residing at this palace, he built the first theater in Thailand called "Pridalai Theater" (โรงละครปรีดาลัย) around 1908. At that time, it was assumed that he requested to build a road cutting through the middle of his palace, and built two shophouse blocks. Thus, people call the street by the name of the palace's owner, Phraeng Nara. The Pridalai Theater later closed and the building was up for rent.13°45′9.3″N 100°29′50.4″E It was later occupied by Talaphat Suksa School (โรงเรียนตะละภัฏศึกษา) and a law firm by the same name. The school was closed in 1995 and the building remained occupied only by the law firm. Sometime between 2000s and 2010s, the law firm moved elsewhere and the building is currently left abandoned, mostly felt into disrepair. As of 2021, it is overgrown whilst still belong to the Crown Property Bureau who has taken control of the place since the prince died.

== Phraeng Sanphasat ==
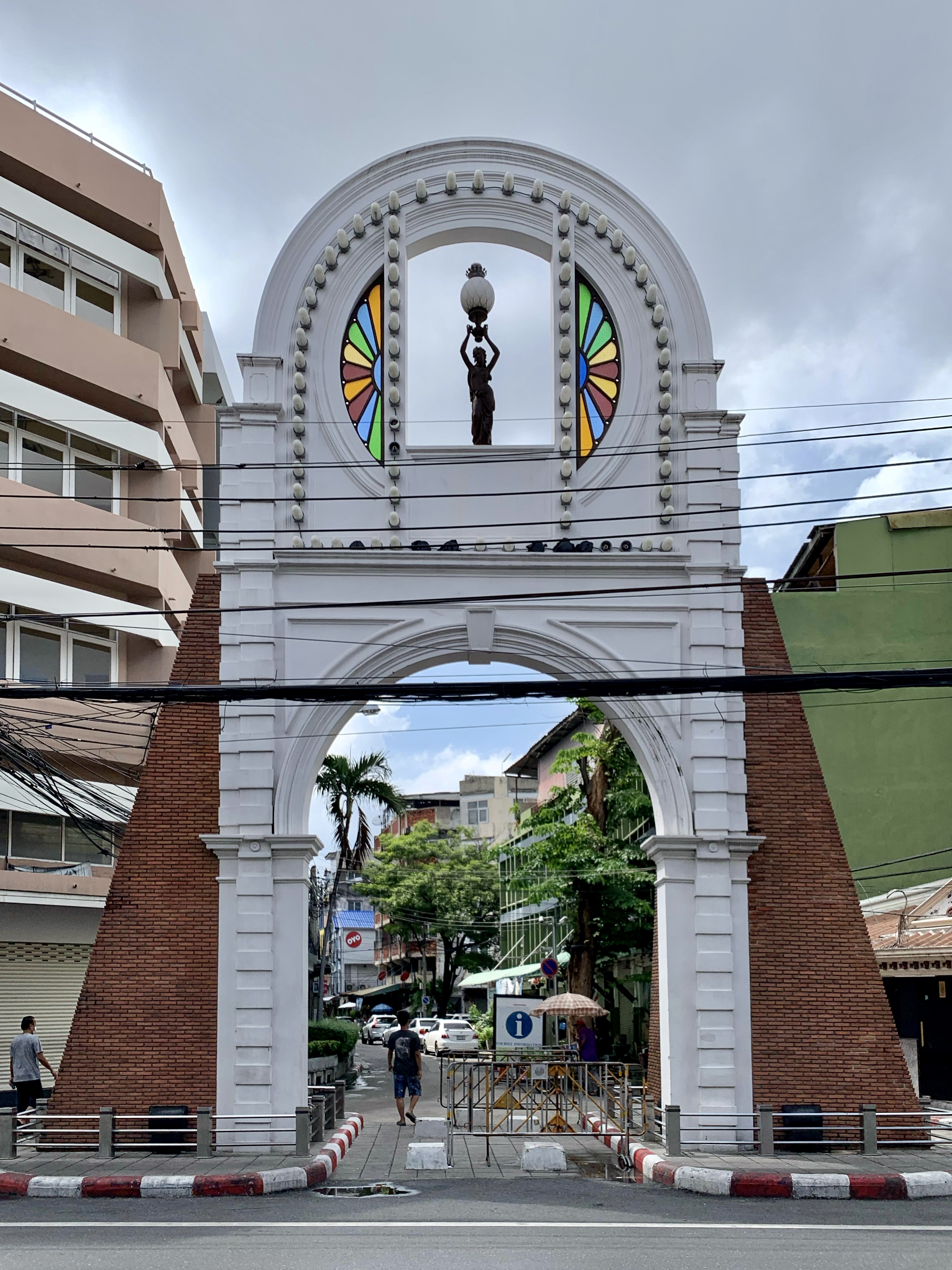
Gateway arch at Phraeng Sanphasat, formerly part of the former palace

Phraeng Sanphasat (แพร่งสรรพศาสตร์) was named after Prince Thongthaem Tawanlayawong (พระองค์เจ้าทองแถมถวัลยวงศ์; later named as Prince Sanphasattra Supakit–พระเจ้าบรมวงศ์เธอ กรมหลวงสรรพสาตรศุภกิจ), the origin of the royal family surname Thongtam. He was a son of King Mongkut and Royal Concubine Sangwan (เจ้าจอมมารดาสังวาลย์). He served as royal page, chief of department. He resided at the palace on Ban Tanao Road next to that of Prince Narathip Prapanpong. After his death, his heir sold the palace area to private. The palace itself was demolished to construct shophouses and the road that cut through the palace was named after the former owner, Phraeng Sanphasat. The landmark of this place is the entrance on Tanao Road is arch with a beautiful European architecture is display. Although it has been burned three times. Besides, it's also known as another district of Bangkok's sex industry around 1960. 13°45′12.5″N 100°29′50.1″E
