= Barabimalabanna Voravan =

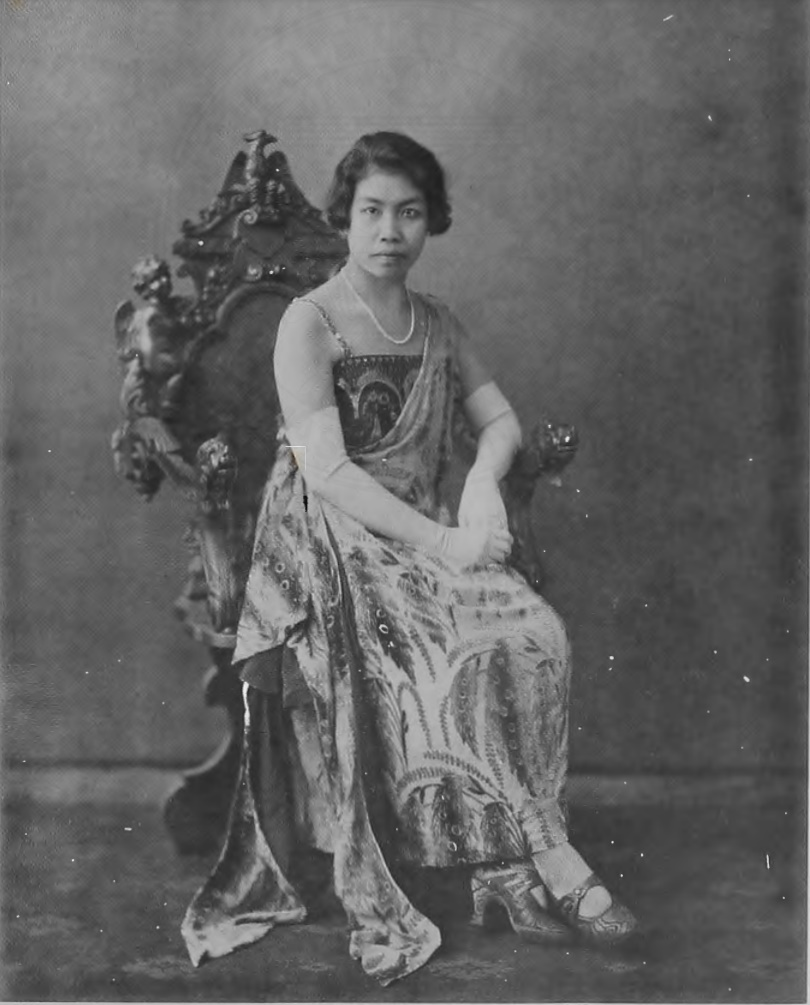
- Princess Barabimalabanna Voravan
- Born: 1 May 1890; Bangkok, Siam
- Died: 18 November 1981 (aged 91); Bangkok, Thailand
- Spouse: Rajani Chamcharas, Prince Bidyalongkorn
- Issue: Vibhavadi Rangsit; Bhisadej Rajani
- House: Vorawan family (by birth); Rajani family (by marriage) (Chakri Dynasty)
- Father: Prince Voravannakara, the Prince Naradhip Prapanpongse
- Mother: Mom Phan Voravan Na Ayudhya

Princess Barabimalabanna (Thai: พรพิมลพรรณ; RTGS: Phonphimonphan complete title: Her Serene Highness Princess (Mom Chao) Barabimalabanna Voravan Thai: พรพิมลพรรณ วรวรรณ) was a Princess of Thailand, a member of Thai royal family and a member of the Voravan family, a royal house which was originated by her father and descends from Chakri Dynasty and half-sister of Princess Vanbimol Voravan (later to be renamed as Lakshamilavan, Princess consort of King Vajiravudh and Princess Vanvimol Voravan (later Princess Vallabhadevi, formerly fiancée of King Vajiravudh).

== Honours ==
- Dame Commander (Second Class, lower grade) of the Most Illustrious Order of Chula Chom Klao (1919)
- King Rama VI Royal Cypher Medal, 2nd Class (1920)
