= Vibhavadi Rangsit =

Thai princess (1920–1977)

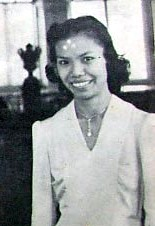
- Princess Vibhavadi Rangsit
- Born: Vibhavadi Rajani; 20 November 1920; Bangkok, Siam
- Died: 16 February 1977 (aged 56); Surat Thani, Thailand
- Spouse: Piyarangsit Rangsit (m. 1946; died 1977)
- Issue: Vibhananda Rangsit; Priyanandana Rangsit
- House: Rajani (by birth); Rangsit (by marriage) (Chakri dynasty)
- Father: Rajani Chamcharas
- Mother: Barabimalabanna Voravan
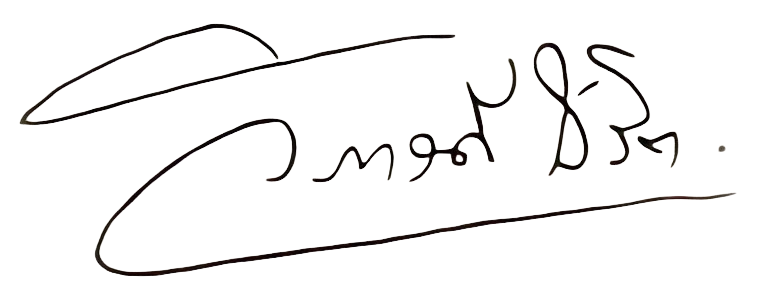
- Signature

Princess Vibhavadi Rangsit (Thai: วิภาวดีรังสิต; RTGS: Wiphawadi Rangsit; 20 November 1920 – 16 February 1977), née Princess Vibhavadi Rajani (Thai: วิภาวดี รัชนี; RTGS: Wiphawadi Ratchani) was a Thai writer and a member of the Thai royal family well known for her fiction writing and her developmental work in rural Thailand.

Princess Vibavadi was killed by the communist insurgent whilst helping the Border Patrol Police in Wiang Sa District, Surat Thani. In her honour, Vibhavadi Rangsit Road, which runs from the border between Phaya Thai and Din Daeng districts in Bangkok to Khu Khot, Lam Luk Ka District, Pathum Thani Province was named after her.

== Early life ==
Vibhavadi Rangsit was born on 20 November 1920. her birth name is Princess Vibhavadi Rajini. She was the eldest daughter of Prince Rajani Chamcharas, Prince Bidyalongkorn and Princess Barabimalabanna Voravan (née Princess Phimonphan Voravan). She had a sibling, Prince Bhisadej Rajani.

The princess was educated at the Mater Dei School, Bangkok. After completing her secondary education, she worked as a secretary for her father, who at the time was one of the most respected poets of the Rattanakosin era and wrote under the pseudonym No. Mo. So. (NMS; นมส.). Princess Vibhavadi inherited her father's gift for writing and displayed her ability as early as age of fourteen, when she began writing children's novels. She was well known by her pen-name V. na Pramuanmarg (ว. ณ ประมวญมารค Wo Na Pramuanmak). Her famous first novel, Prisana (ปริศนา Pritsana), was written when she was eighteen and was followed by two sequels and many other novels, some of them historical.

== Marriage ==
HRH Princess Vibhavadi Rangsit married HSH Prince Piyarangsit Rangsit (ปิยะรังสิต รังสิต), eldest son of Rangsit Prayurasakdi, Prince of Chainat and Elisabeth Scharnberger, on 6 May 1946. They were the only couple married by King Ananda Mahidol (Rama VIII). She had two daughters:

1. Mom Rajawongse Vibhananda Rangsit (วิภานันท์ รังสิต Wiphanan Rangsit)
2. Mom Rajawongse Priyanandana Rangsit (ปริยนันทนา รังสิต Priyananthana Rangsit)

== Work ==
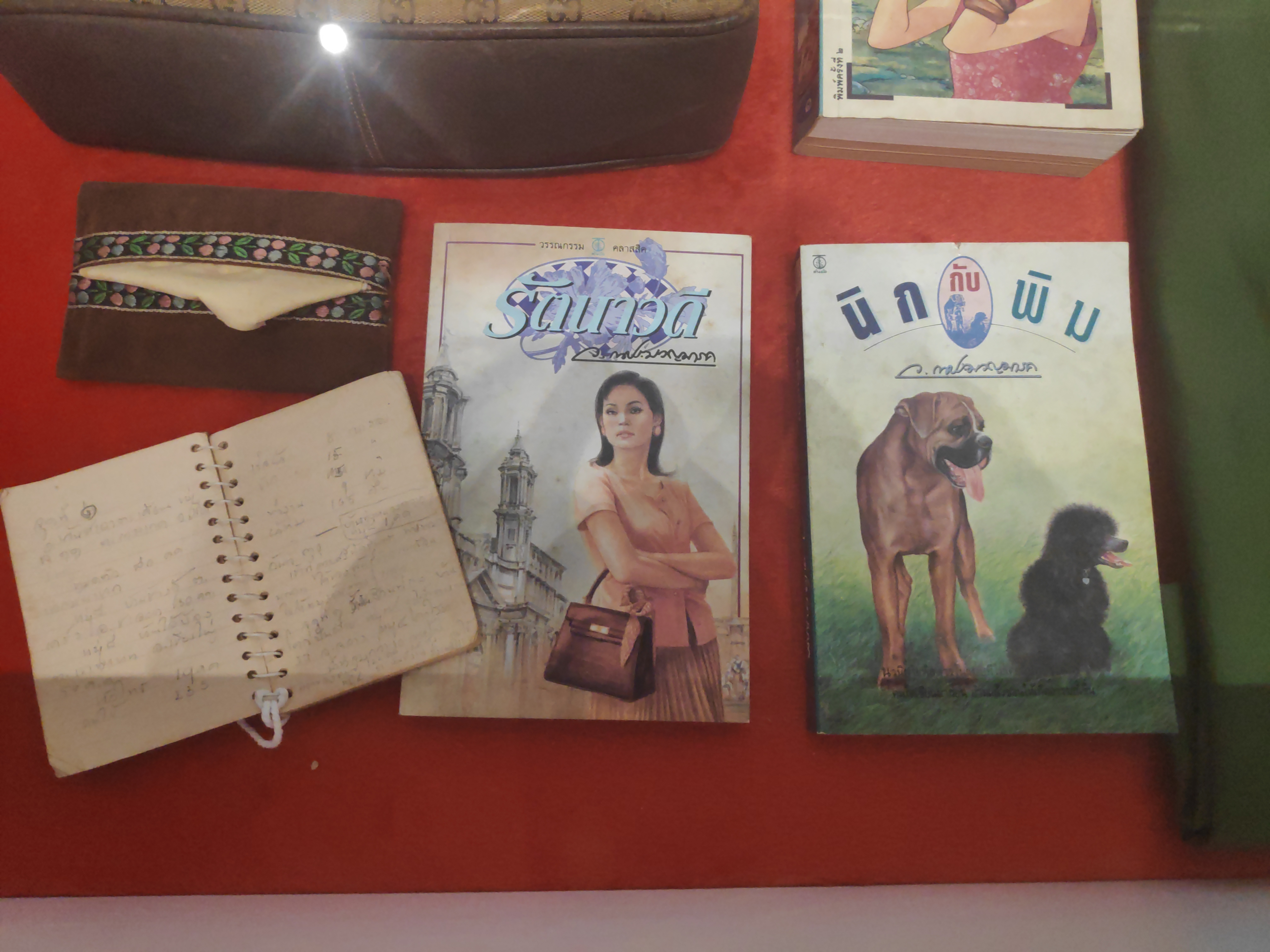
Some novels written by Vibhavadi Rangsit in her pseudonyms V. na Pramuanmarg: (from left) "Ratanavadi" (a sequel of her famous novel "Prisana"), "Nick and Pim"

In addition to a full writing career, the princess worked for her third cousin, King Bhumibol Adulyadej and his consort, Queen Sirikit of Thailand. In 1957, she began accompanying them when they toured the country and was appointed a lady-in-waiting to the queen when they went on their first state visit abroad in 1960. Princess Vibhavadi accompanied them on seven occasions, visiting twenty-five countries.

The last ten years of her life were dedicated to rural development in southern Thailand under the direction and sponsorship of the king. Her involvement began when the monarch asked her to go to a remote area called Phrasaeng in Surat Thani Province. From that initial visit in 1967, she was committed to the development of neglected areas and the improvement of the villagers' living standards. Sponsored by the king, she led a medical team on many missions to distribute medical supplies, schooling equipment, blankets, and other necessities to villagers in remote and almost inaccessible parts of the South.

== Death ==
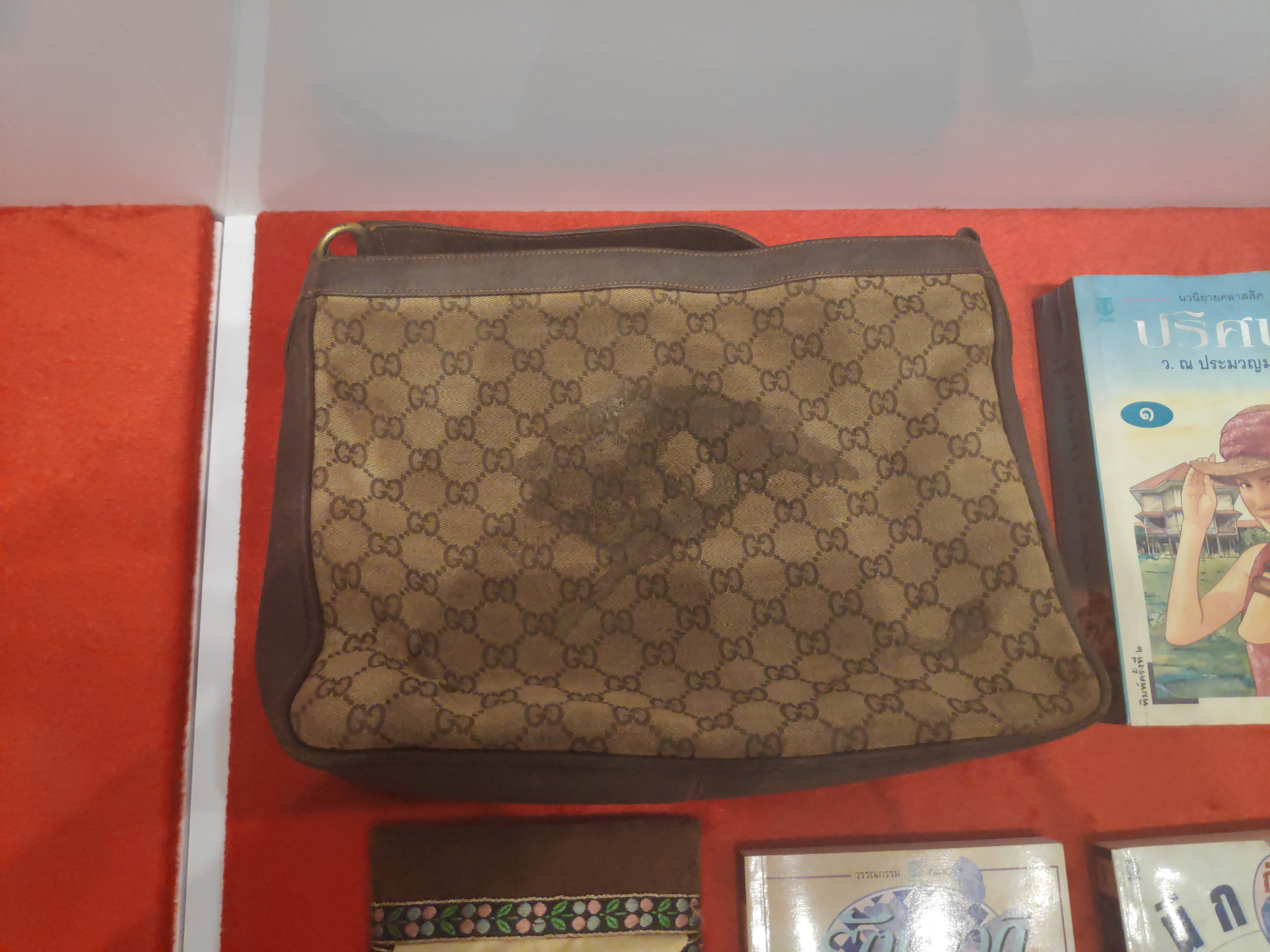
A personal Gucci handbag of Princess Vibhavadi Rangsit which was stained with her blood. She was seriously wounded from a burst of heavy machine gun fire to her helicopter and died on February 16, 1977. Now displayed at the National Memorial of Thailand

Princess Vibavadi often visited soldiers and Border Patrol Police stationed in areas where there was communist insurgency. On the morning of 16 February 1977, she set off on what should have been a routine visit to villages and to boost the morale of troops at Wiang Sa District, Surat Thani. While flying to her destination in an army helicopter, she heard a radio message saying two Border Patrol Policemen had been wounded by a landmine. She immediately ordered the flight diverted to pick up the wounded men and rush them to a hospital. As they flew at low altitude over Ban Nua Khlong, the helicopter was attacked from the ground by communist insurgents. A burst of heavy machine gun fire crippled the helicopter and seriously wounded the princess. She died one hour later.

Prior to her royally sponsored cremation at Phra Si Mahathat Temple, on 4 April 1977, "in recognition of her services to the country and the people", the king elevated her to the higher royal rank of Phra Chao Worawongse Ther Phra Ong Chao (Her Royal Highness) and awarded her the highest level of the most Illustrious Order of the House of Chakri.

== Legacy ==
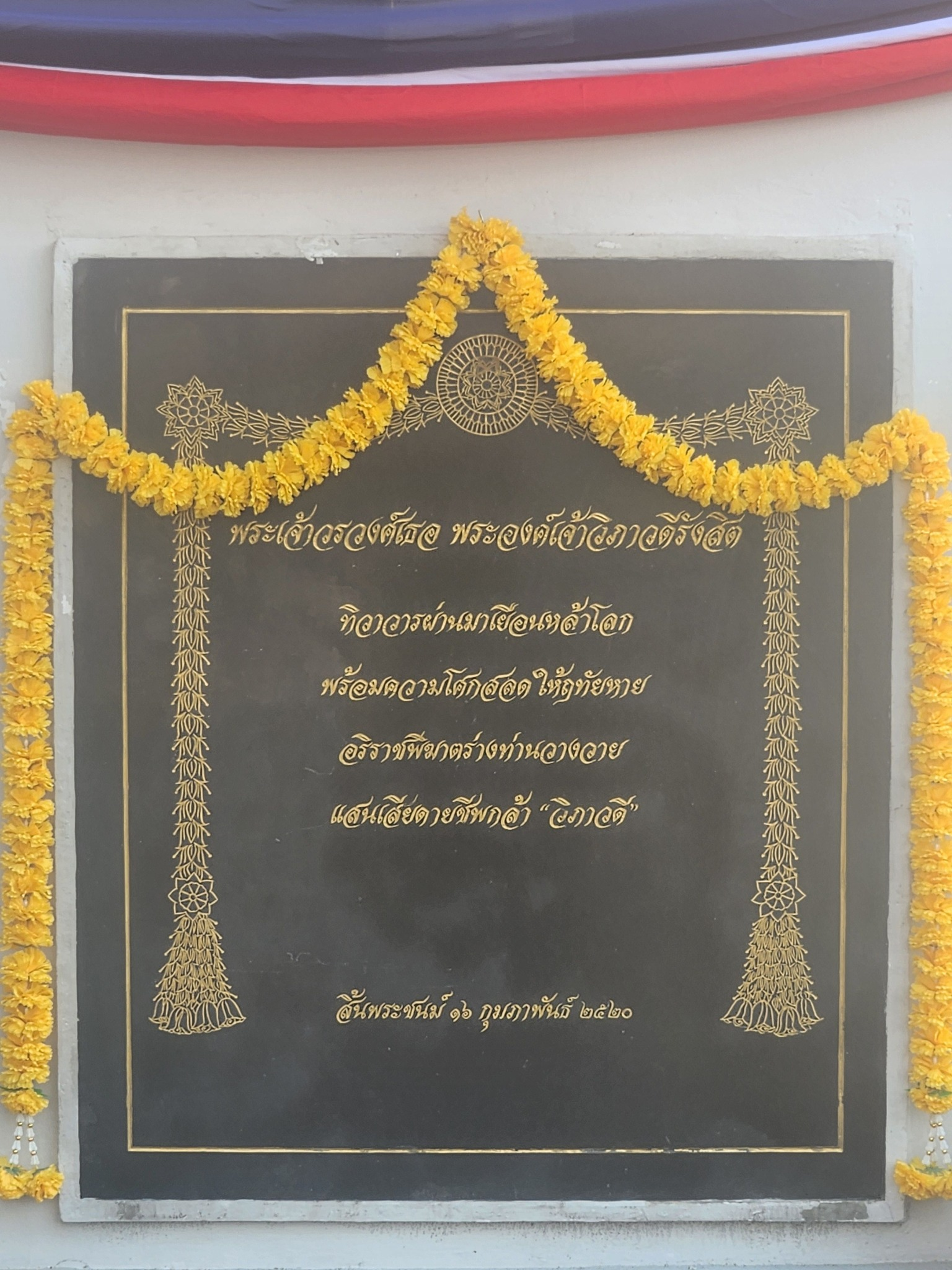
A plaque dedicated to Princess Vibhavadi Rangsit at the National Memorial of Thailand, near Vibhavadi Rangsit Road, Lam Luk Ka District, Pathum Thani Province.

February 16 is now known in Surat Thani as Vibhavadi Day, and civil and religious ceremonies are held in her honour.

Her husband, Prince Piya Rangsit, founded the Vibhavadi Rangsit Foundation to ensure the continuity of her charitable work in the southern provinces.

Vibhavadi Rangsit Road, which runs from the boarder between Phaya Thai and Din Daeng districts in Bangkok to Khu Khot, Lam Luk Ka District, Pathum Thani Province was also named in her honour.

== Honours ==
=== Paramilitary rank ===
- 14 March 1977 : Volunteer Defense Corps Colonel (posthumous promoted)

=== Decorations ===
Vibhavadi received the following royal decorations in the Honours System of Thailand :

- 1977 - Knight of the Most Illustrious Order of the Royal House of Chakri (posthumous awarded)
- 1968 - Dame Grand Commander of the Order of Chula Chom Klao
- 1977 - Dame Grand Cross of the Order of the White Elephant
- 1953 - King Rama IX Royal Cypher Medal, Third Class
- 1960 - King Rama IX Rajaruchi Medal

=== Foreign honours ===
- Belgium :
  - Grand Cross of the Order of Leopold II
- Netherlands :
  - Knight Grand Cross of the Order of Orange-Nassau
- Portugal :
  - Grand Officer of the Order of Prince Henry
- Japan :
  - Gold and Silver Star of the Order of the Rising Sun
- Italian Republic :
  - Grand Officer of the Order of Merit of the Italian Republic
- Kingdom of Greece :
  - Grand Commander of the Order of Honour
- Spain :
  - Commander of the Order of Isabella the Catholic
- UK :
  - Knight Commander of the Royal Victorian Order (KCVO)
- Denmark :
  - Commander 1st Class of the Order of the Dannebrog
- West Germany :
  - Knight Commander of the Order of Merit of the Federal Republic of Germany
- Sweden :
  - Knight 1st Class of the Order of the Polar Star
- Luxembourg :
  - Knight of the Order of Adolphe of Nassau
