= Wichaichan =

Last Viceroy of Siam

Wichaichan; วิไชยชาญ
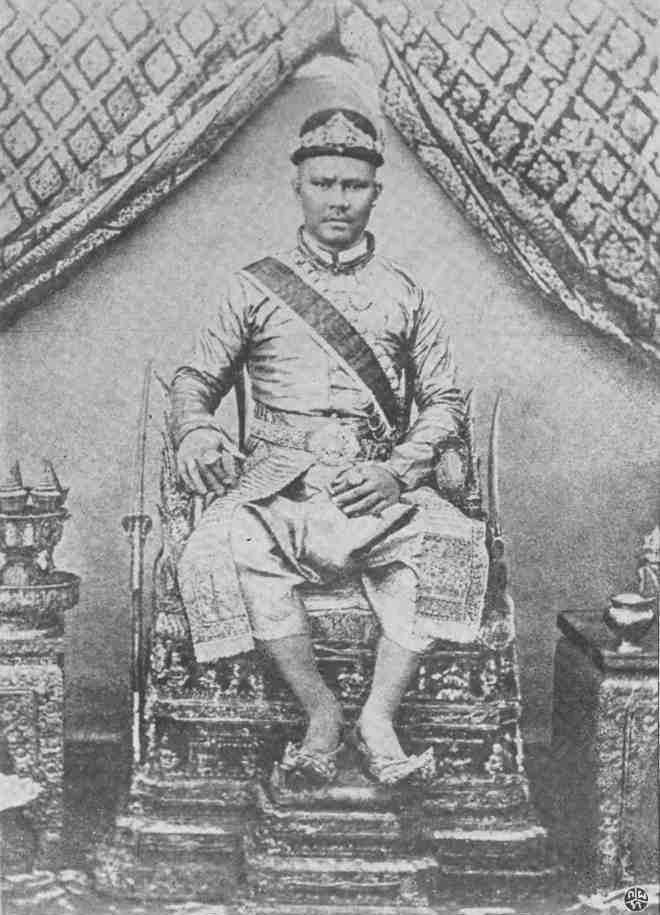
- Prince Wichaichan on his throne

Viceroy of Siam
- Tenure: 2 October 1868 – 28 August 1885
- Appointer: Ascension Council on behalf of Chulalongkorn (Rama V)
- Predecessor: Pinklao (Chutamani)
- Successor: Viceroyalty abolished; (Vajirunhis as Crown Prince)
- Born: Prince Yodyingyot; 6 April 1838; Thonburi, Siam
- Died: 28 August 1885 (aged 47); Bangkok, Siam
- Spouses: Prik Lek Na Nagara; Various consorts
- Issue: 28 sons and daughters, including: Rajani Chamcharas, Prince Bidyalongkorn
- Dynasty: Chakri
- Father: Pinklao (Chutamani)
- Mother: Aim Sae-ong
- Religion: Theravada Buddhism

Wichaichan (Thai: วิไชยชาญ) (6 April 1838 – 28 August 1885) was a Siamese prince and member of the Chakri dynasty. He was the eldest son of Viceroy Pinklao and Princess Aim, and thus nephew to King Mongkut (Rama IV). Wichaichan succeeded his father by being appointed the Front Palace and Viceroy of Siam in 1868, during the reign of his cousin King Chulalongkorn (Rama V). During his tenure the office of Front Palace was extremely powerful and rivalled that of the monarch's own. Inevitably the two forces clashed in the Front Palace crisis. Wichaichan was defeated and the power of the Front Palace was greatly diminished. After his death in 1885, the last vestiges of the title were abolished in favour of a crown prince. Notably, he is the only Front Palace that was elected by the council, not appointed by the king in accordance with the royal tradition, which is still considered as controversial and unorthodox practice to this day.

== Early life ==
Phra Ong Chao Yodyingyot Bovorn Rachorod Rattana Rachakumarn (พระองค์เจ้ายอดยิ่งประยุรยศบวรราโชรสรัตนราชกุมาร) was born on the 6 April 1838, the eldest son of Prince Chutamani and Princess Aim. It was said that his father gave him an English name in honour of his personal hero, the first President of the United States, George Washington. Therefore, he is sometimes referred to as Prince George Washington or Prince George. In May 1851 Prince Yodyingyot's father was elevated as Second King Pinklao or the Front Palace by his older brother King Mongkut (Rama IV). Pinklao also received from his brother all the styles, titles and honour of a monarch, despite never having been crowned himself. During his childhood the Prince received a modern education, including the English language and modern sciences. It was said that he became an extremely skillful engineer.

After King Pinklao's death in 1866, King Mongkut decided not to appoint another Front Palace due to the fact that his own son Prince Chulalongkorn was only 12 years old. This meant that the position which was also that of the heir presumptive was left unoccupied (Siam had no law of succession at the time, but the Viceroy was seen as the strongest claimant). Fearing instability, Chao Phraya Sri Suriwongse (Chuang Bunnag) the Kalahom (one of the Prime Ministers of Siam) tried to persuade the King to appoint Prince Yodyingyot to succeed King Pinklao. Sri Suriwongse was a member of the powerful Bunnag family, which had dominated the running of the Siamese government since the reign of King Phutthaloetla Naphalai (Rama II). The King refused to appoint Yodyingyot, instead he elevated the Prince to Krom Muen Bowon Wichaichan or Prince Bowon Wichaichan in 1867. This meant Wichaichan was only made a Prince of the Front Palace but not the actual title of Front Palace. Since 1865 the Prince was also the commander of the Front Palace's naval forces.

Wichaichan was a friend of the British Consul-General to Siam: Thomas George Knox, he was originally recruited by Pinklao to modernize the Front Palace's armed forces. Knox preferred the mature and experienced Wichaichan — who was also the son of one of the most westernized member of the elite to ascend the throne — over the young Chulalongkorn.

== Reign ==
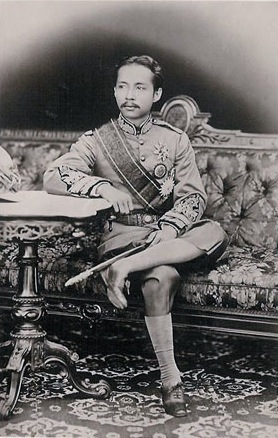
Photograph of Wichaichan's cousin King Chulalongkorn or Rama V (in Western style uniform)

In August 1868 King Mongkut contracted malaria whilst on an expedition to see a solar eclipse in Prachuap Khiri Khan province, six weeks later he died on 1 October. The young Chulalongkorn (who was only 15 years old at the time) was unanimously declared king by a council of high-ranking nobility, princes of the Chakri dynasty and monks. The council was presided by Sri Suriwongse who was also appointed regent for the young king.

During the meeting, when one of the princes nominated Wichaichan as the next Front Palace, many in the council objected. The most notable objection of this nomination came from Prince Vorachak Tharanubhab. The prince argued that the appointment of such an important position was the sole prerogative of the king and not of the council. Furthermore, the position was not hereditary, and the appointment of the son of the former could set a dangerous precedent. However, the nomination of Wichaichan was supported by Sri Suriwongse who wanted to secure a line of succession by appointing an able and experienced Front Palace (as the second-in-line to the throne). Sri Suriwongse was determined and retorted by accusing the prince of wanting to be appointed himself ("ที่ไม่ยอมนั้น อยากจะเป็นเองหรือ"). The prince replied wearily "If you have ask me to permit it [the appointment], then I will have to permit it" ("ถ้าจะให้ยอมก็ต้องยอม"). As a result, Prince Wichaichan was appointed Front Palace (Krom Phra Rajawang Bovorn Sathan Mongkol) and viceroy without the full consent of the incoming monarch. The relationship between Chulalongkorn and the Wichaichan would remain difficult for the rest of the latter's life, based on this fact. On 11 November 1868, Wichaichan's cousin Chulalongkorn was crowned Supreme King of Siam at the Grand Palace.

Since the elevation of King Pinklao twenty years earlier, the office of Front Palace had gained considerable amount of power and prestige. The viceroy had his own army of over 2,000 men, western trained and western armed. He also controlled a naval forces of several steam powered gunboats. The prince also had a large share of state revenues, over one-third of which is given directly to him for the maintenance of his officials, retinue, court, concubines, and advisors.

=== Front Palace crisis ===
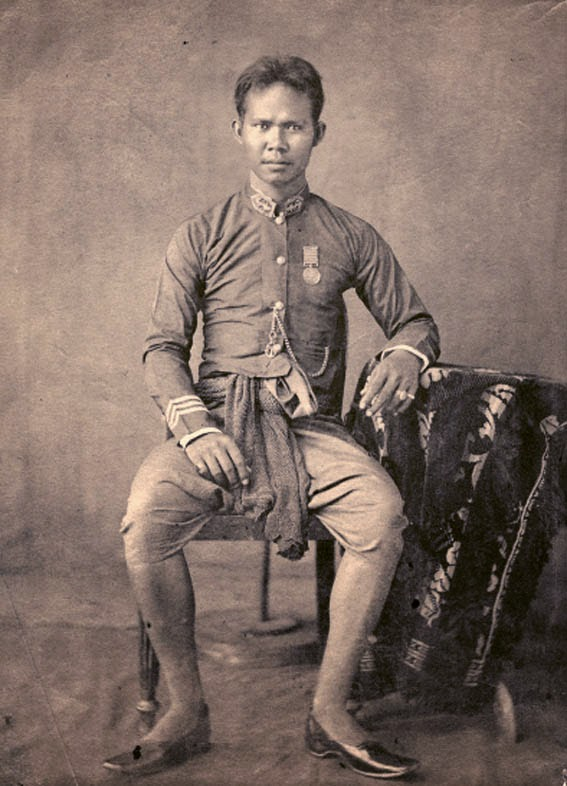
Photograph of Prince Yodyingyot, later Bowon Wichaichan. In foreign accounts, The Prince is usually referred to as "Prince George Washington". He was appointed Front Palace in 1868.

When Chulalongkorn came of age in 1873, he and his western-educated brothers were intent on creating a modern absolutist state. Siamese government during previous reigns were dominated by the aristocracy, with many elements of feudalism still in existence. In order to modernize and centralize the state, Chulalongkorn must consolidate the royal government's control over finances and the bureaucracy. First, he created the Auditing Office and then, a year later, the Privy Council of Siam. These two reforms quickly drew the ire of the aristocracy and Wichaichan, whose powers were slowly being eroded.

The conflict between Chulalongkorn and Wichaichan over these reforms erupted in open confrontation, after Wichaichan received an anonymous letter threatening his life. On 28 December 1874, a fire erupted in the Grand Palace. Wichaichan's reluctance to help quell the flames gave Chulalongkorn the excuse he needed to lay siege to the Front Palace. As a result, on the night of 2 January 1875, Wichaichan fled to the British consulate to the south of Bangkok to seek refuge from the king. Negotiations between the two cousins began, however no clear conclusions were reached. With Wichaichan under the impression that his life was in danger, he refused all reconciliation.

By February, the crisis has reached stalemate. Si Suriwongse decided to advise the British acting-Consul to invite an influential person to intervene and end the crisis. Invitations were made to Sir Andrew Clarke the Governor of the Straits Settlements. Clarke arrived in Bangkok on 18 February. After some deliberations with various factions, he decided to support the young king over Wichaichan. On the evening of 24 February, Clarke forced the humiliated Wichaichan to accept Chulalongkorn's terms in full.

The terms of the settlement stripped Wichaichan of all of his powers. He was able to keep only 200 guards of small weaponry and was also forced to abdicate his title of viceroy. Despite this, he was able to remain Front Palace and keep his residence. Chulalongkorn also promised to take responsibility for his finances and safety. He lived the rest of his life quietly as an educated gentleman, being consigned to his palace. The role and influence of the Front Palace and the nobility was greatly diminished, and Chulalongkorn was able to continue his reforms in peace without opposition. In 1881 Wichaichan met King Kalākaua of the Hawaiian Islands, who made a stop in Siam on his world tour. The king noted that Wichaichan was well educated and spoke English fluently.

== Death ==
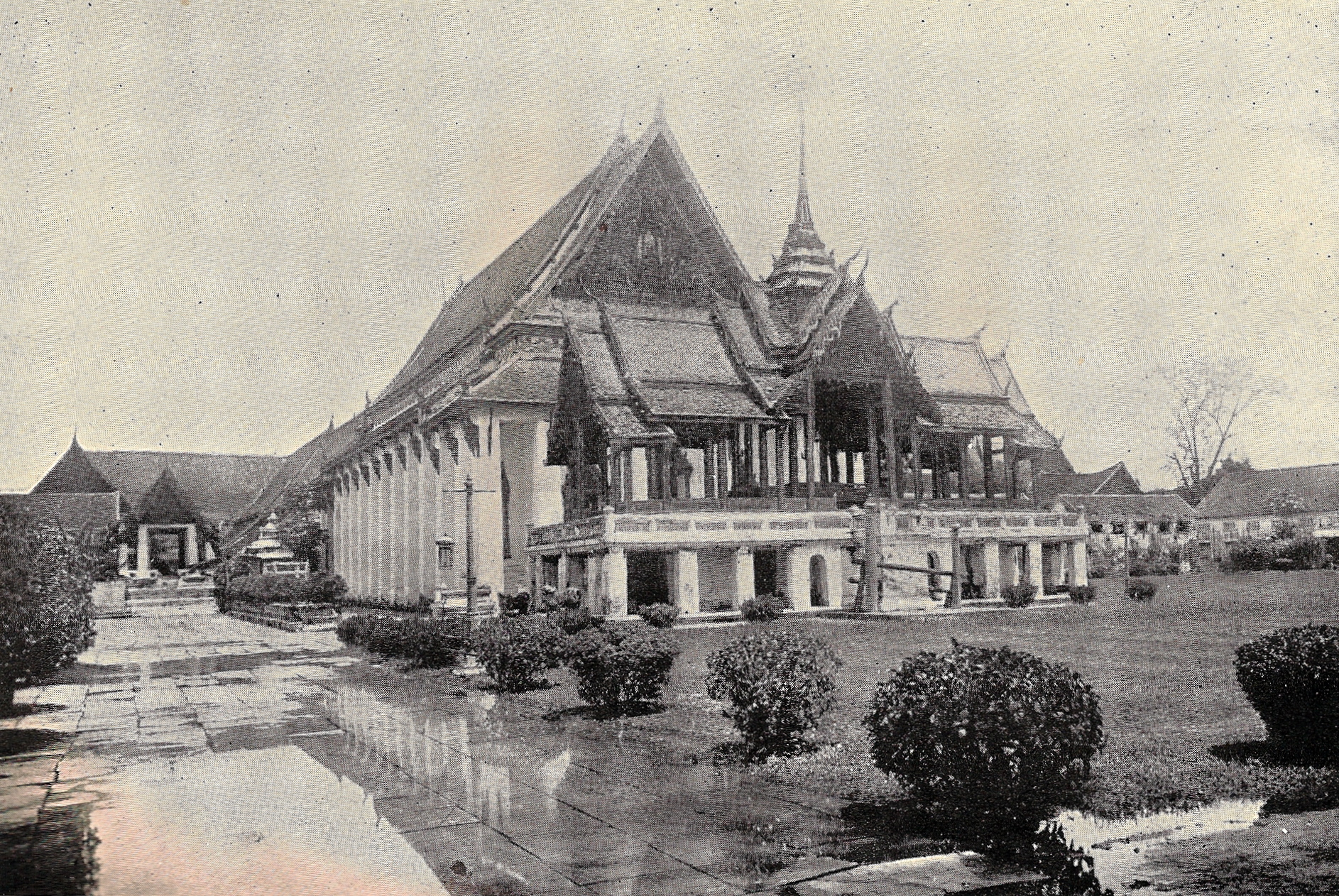
Photograph of the Front Palace or Wang Na (circa 1890) now the Bangkok National Museum

Wichaichan died on 28 August 1885 at the age of 47. Prince Bovorn Wichaichan was cremated with great ceremony on the field of Sanam Luang on 14 June 1886. The Front Palace compound itself was partly demolished, parts that remain were given to Wichaichan's consorts, daughters and sisters as residences (sons were excluded).

After his death the office of Front Palace was left vacant until On 14 January 1886, when Chulalongkorn's son with Princess Consort Savang Vadhana was made Crown Prince Maha Vajirunhis or Somdet Phra Boromma-orasathirat Sayam Makutrajakuman. The title of Front Palace, which was first created in 1688 by King Petracha of Ayutthaya was thus abolished and replaced with an heir apparent, whose succession is to be based on the principle of male primogeniture. The new invented title brought Siamese succession in line with the European tradition.

== Family ==
During his lifetime Wichaichan fathered 28 children with various consorts and concubines. With Chao Chom Manda Prik Lek, he had a son, Prince Karnchananophas Rasmi, the Prince of Chanchai Bovornyod, whose descendants use the surname: Kanchanawichai and with Consort Leam: Prince Rajani Chamcharas, the Prince Bidyalongkorn, whose descendants use the surname: Rajani. One of Prince Rajani Chamcharas' descendants is Mom Chao Bhisadej Rajani, the President of the Royal Projects of King Bhumibol Adulyadej (Rama IX), a grandson of King Chulalongkorn.

== Royal titles and decorations ==
Title

• 1838-unknown : His Serence Highness Prince George Washington

- Unknown−1867: His Royal Highness Prince Yodying Prayurayot
- 1867−1868: His Royal Highness Prince Yodying Prayurayot, the Prince Bowon Wichaichan
- 1868−1885: His Royal Highness The Viceroy of Siam

=== Decorations ===
Prince Wichaichan received the following honours from the Siamese honour system:

- Knight of The Most Illustrious Order of the Royal House of Chakri
- Knight of The Ancient and Auspicious Order of the Nine Gems
- Knight Grand Cross (First Class) of The Most Illustrious Order of Chula Chom Klao

== See also ==
- Pinklao
- Chulalongkorn
- Si Suriyawongse
- Andrew Clarke (administrator)
- Vajirunhis
- Front Palace
- Crown Prince of Thailand
- Grand Palace
- Rattanakosin Kingdom

== Notes ==
Wichaichan House of Chakri Born: 6 April 1838 Died: 28 August 1885
Regnal titles
Vacant Title last held by Pinklao	Viceroy of Siam; 2 October 1868 – 28 August 1885	Succeeded by Vajirunhis as Crown Prince of Siam
Military offices
Preceded by Pinklao	Commander of the Front Palace Navy; 1866–1885	Succeeded by Sai Sanidwongse as Officer-General to the Navy
