= Mit Ko Yuan =

Coordinates: 13°45′14.19″N 100°30′3.83″E

Mit Ko Yuan (Thai: มิตรโกหย่วน, pronounced [mít koː jùan]) is a small single-unit shophouse restaurant located on Dinso Road, opposite Bangkok City Hall and near the Giant Swing, Bangkok. It is a Hainanese Chinese restaurant in the "cookshop" style (a type of Chinese eatery owned and operated by Chinese proprietors and chefs, serving Chinese cuisine influenced by Western recipes).

== History ==
The restaurant has been in operation for over 80 years, dating back to the late reign of King Rama VIII. It was founded by the father of the current owner, whose name was Ko Yuan. The name "Mit Ko Yuan" literally means "Ko Yuan's friends," as he had a passion for tasting and cooking food, and was encouraged by his friends to open a restaurant. The business has continued to operate to this day.

Inside the restaurant, a price board dating back to 1966 is still on display.

== Signature dishes ==
Mit Ko Yuan is known for a variety of signature dishes, such as braised beef tongue, a recipe said to have been passed down from Pridi Banomyong, a former Prime Minister and senior statesman who was educated in France; mi krop; tom yum goong; blanched blood cockles with spicy seafood dipping sauce; stir-fried clams with Thai chili paste; and khao phat rot fai, a Thai-style fried rice in which soy sauce is replaced with a reddish sauce similar to that used in yen ta fo noodles. This dish is believed to have originated along the southern railway line around Hua Hin in the past, and is now rarely found.
