= Bidyalongkorn =

Thai prince and author (1876–1945)

Rajani Chamcharas; รัชนีแจ่มจรัส
- Prince Bidyalongkorn
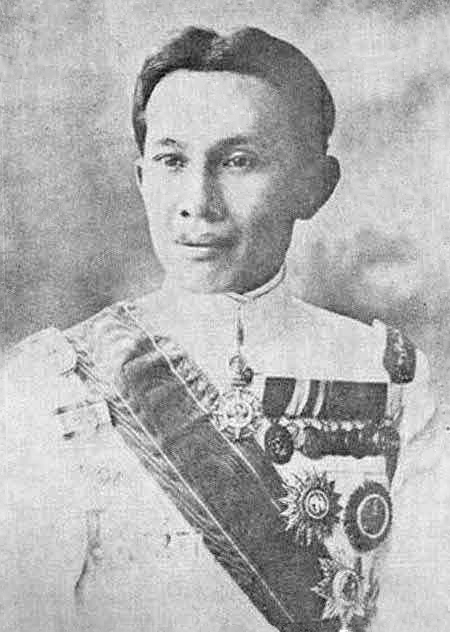
- Prince Rajani in c. 1940s
- Born: 10 January 1876; Bangkok, Siam
- Died: 23 July 1945 (aged 69); Bangkok, Thailand
- Spouses: Phat Bunnag; Barabimalabanna Voravan
- Issue: Princess Vibhavadi Rajani; Prince Bhisadej Rajani; Prince Chand Chirayu Rajani; 8 other children
- House: Rajani
- Dynasty: Chakri
- Father: Wichaichan (Yodyingyot)
- Mother: Lady Liam-lek
- Religion: Theravada Buddhism

Prince Rajani Chamcharas, the Prince Bidyalongkorn (Note: " 'Bidyalankarana' is the Indianist transliteration as preferred by the Prince himself.") (Thai: รัชนีแจ่มจรัส; RTGS: Ratchani Chaemcharat; 10 January 1876 – 23 July 1945) The complete title is His Royal Highness Prince Rajani Chamcharas. He was a prince of Thailand and a member of the Thai royal family, the 22nd child of Prince Wichaichan, the Viceroy of Siam during the reign of Rama V and the second of Khun Chom Manda Liam, He is one of the grandsons of King Pinklao. His many descendants use the royal surname Rajani (Thai: รัชนี; RTGS: Ratchani).

He was born in the Front Palace, Bangkok, and from 1886 to 1891 attended the recently founded Suankularb Wittayalai School. From 1896 to 1933 he served in a variety of governmental offices and royal advisory roles, including the Ministry of Finance, the Royal Mint, the Department of Inspection, the Department of Records, the Privy Council, the Department of Statistics and Prediction, the Department of Commerce, and the Royal Academy.

The Historical Dictionary of Thailand notes:

He studied ... at Cambridge in England. He served in high-level administrative positions in the Ministry of Public Instruction and also the Ministry of Finance. He accompanied King Rama V (Chulalongkorn) on his first visits to Europe. Upon returning from Cambridge, in 1901, he started the magazine Lak Wittaya (Stealing Knowledge), which provided translations of Western literary works and offered the Siamese a chance to publish their literary work.

Tai linguist William J. Gedney called him "probably Thailand's most gifted man of letters of the twentieth century". James N. Mosel, discussing Thai poetry of the early and mid 20th century, notes that:

[He] ranks as one of the greatest poets of modern times, although his first works were in fiction, where, under the pen-name of "N.M.S." (Note: Alternatively transcribed "No.Mo.So." or "Nor.Mor.Sor.") he achieved wide popularity as a humorist. In poetry he is famous for his Konok Nakhon ("City of Gold"), a Thai adaptation of an English translation of a Sanskrit work. His magnum opus is Sam Krung ("Three Capitals"), a lengthy epic recounting the turbulent period in Thai history when Ayutthaya, Thonburi, and Bangkok successively became the Thai capital.

King Rama VI (Vajiravudh), himself an accomplished author and translator, formed a literary club to promote good writing in Thailand. Bidyalongkorn, a member of the club, formulated a series of rules encouraging correct and concise language, as well as strict observance of classic Thai verse structures. An innovator as well as a traditionalist, he was an influential adopter of novel meters of the chan verse type which, before 1913, had remained unchanged for centuries.

== Honours ==
=== National honours ===
- Knight Grand Cross (First Class) of the Most Illustrious Order of Chula Chom Klao (1916)
- Knight Grand Cross (First Class) of the Most Exalted Order of the White Elephant (1913)
- Knight Grand Cross (First Class) of the Most Noble Order of the Crown of Thailand (1912)
- Chakrabarti Mala Medal (1920)
- Saradul Mala Medal (1925)
- King Rama VI Royal Cypher Medal, 2nd Class (1914)
- King Rama VII Royal Cypher Medal, 3rd Class (1926)
- Rachada Bhisek Medal (1893)
- Prabas Mala Medal (1897)
- Rajini Medal (1897)
- Dvidha Bhisek Medal (1903)
- Rajamangala Medal (1907)
- Rajamangala Bhisek Medal (1908)
- King Rama VI Coronation Medal (1911)
- King Rama VII Coronation Medal (1925)
- Commemorative Medal on the Occasion of the 150th Years of Rattanakosin Celebration (1932)

=== Foreign honours ===
- Italy:
  - Knight Grand Cross of the Order of the Crown of Italy (1915)

== Selected works ==
- Vetala Tales (Thai: นิทานเวตาล; RTGS: Nithan Wetan) (1918) — a Thai version of the Baital Pachisi, based chiefly on Richard Francis Burton's retelling
- "The Pastime of Rhyme-Making and Singing in Rural Siam" (PDF). Journal of the Siam Society. 20 (2): 101–127. October 1926. ISSN 0304-226X.
- "The Buddha's Footprints" (PDF). Journal of the Siam Society. 28 (1): 1–14. 1935. ISSN 0304-226X.
- "Sebhā Recitation and the Story of Khun Chāng Khun Phan" (PDF). Journal of the Siam Society. 33 (1): 1–22. March 1941. ISSN 0304-226X.
- Three Capitals (Thai: สามกรุง; RTGS: Sam Krung). Bangkok: Chaiyarit. 1952. OCLC 31593320.
  - Montri Umavijani (1981). A Poetic Journey Through Thai History: Based on Prince Bidyalankarana's Sam Krung. Bangkok: National Identity Board. OCLC 10548242. — Discussion and excerpts in English
- Essays on Thai Poetry. Bangkok: Office of the National Culture Commission. 1981. OCLC 8718363.

== Notes and references ==
=== References ===
- Fry, Gerald W.; Nieminen, Gayla S.; Smith, Harold E. (2013). Historical Dictionary of Thailand (3rd ed.). Plymouth, UK: Scarecrow Press. p. 62. ISBN 978-0-8108-7525-8.
- Gedney, William J. (1989). "Siamese Verse Forms in Historical Perspective". In Bickner, Robert J.; Hartmann, John; Hudak, Thomas John; Patcharin Peyasantiwong (eds.). Selected Papers on Comparative Tai Studies. Michigan Papers on South and Southeast Asia No 29. University of Michigan. pp. 489–544. ISBN 9780891480389.
- Hudak, Thomas J. (1990). The Indigenization of Pali Meters in Thai Poetry. Monographs in International Studies: Southeast Asia Series, #87. Athens, Ohio: Ohio University Center for International Studies. ISBN 0-89680-159-4.
- Mosel, James N. (1961). Trends and Structure in Contemporary Thai Poetry: With Translations and Bibliography. Ithaca, NY: Southeast Asia Program, Dept. of Far Eastern Studies, Cornell University. OCLC 3177676.
- Wibha Senanan (1973). The Genesis and Early Development of the Novel in Thailand (PDF) (Ph.D. thesis). School of Oriental and African Studies, University of London. OCLC 1079331426.
