= Nattaporn Ice Cream =

Coordinates: 13°45′06.32″N 100°29′51.07″E

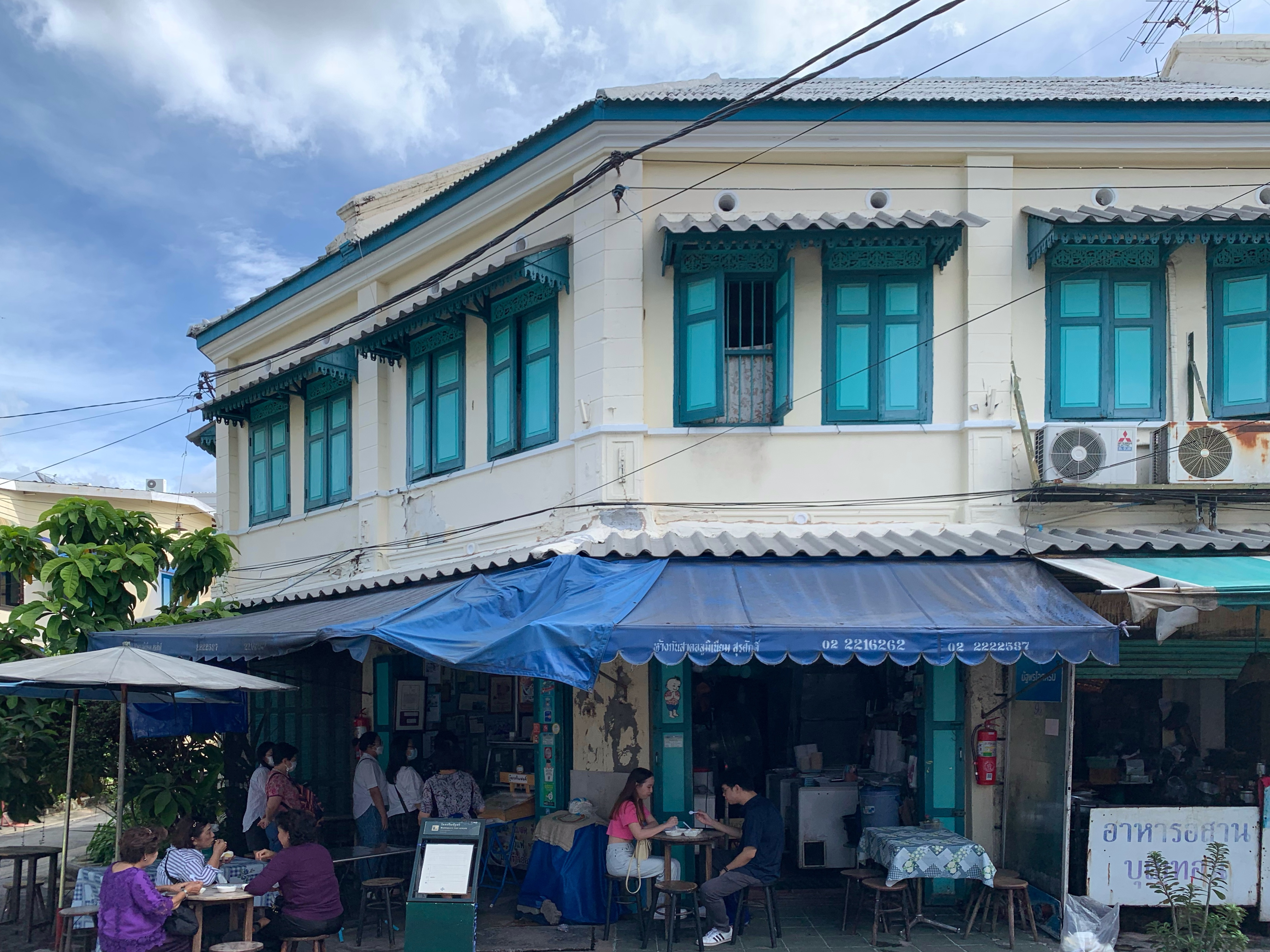
- Nattaporn Ice Cream
- Interactive map of Nattaporn Ice Cream

Restaurant information
- Established: 1989 (official)
- Owners: Nattaporn Rungrotesuwan; Thanyamon "Nui" Wattanasakulek
- Previous owners: Nattaporn and Thanyamon's grandmother
- Food type: Thai-style ice cream
- Dress code: Casual
- Location: Phraeng Phuthon, Sam Phraeng, Phra Nakhon, Bangkok, 10200, Thailand

Nattaporn Ice Cream (Thai: นัฐพรไอศกรีม, pronounced [nát.pɔːn aj-sàk-krim]) is a homemade ice cream parlor that produces and serves its ice cream in a small, historic two-story shophouse built in the Sino-Portuguese architectural style, located in Phraeng Phuthon, one of the three phraeng (small lanes) in the Sam Phraeng area of Phra Nakhon district, Bangkok.

Situated within Rattanakosin Island, the historic old town of Bangkok, the parlor specializes in traditional Thai-style ice cream and has been in operation for over 80 years, dating back to around the time of World War II. The current owner, Nattaporn Rungrotesuwan, explains that her family is of Chinese descent and has been selling food in the Sam Phraeng area for many generations, dating back to her grandmother's time. She represents the second generation. Although the family has a long history in the neighborhood, the ice cream parlor itself officially began full-scale operations in 1989

The parlor's ice cream is distinctive for its texture, which is crumbly like sand and contains tiny ice crystals that give a pleasant crunch when eaten. Unlike typical ice cream parlors, scoops are not served using a traditional ice cream scoop but rather with a regular rice-serving ladle. The ice cream is served with a variety of toppings, such as luk chit (sugar palm seeds), corn, job's tears, barley, roasted peanuts, sticky rice, black beans, and red beans. Flavors include fresh coconut, fresh milk, fresh strawberry, chocolate, coffee, Japanese black sesame, Thai green tea, and Japanese teas such as matcha, hojicha, and genmaicha. A special offering is the Mahachanok mango ice cream, made from a variety of large, premium-priced mangoes.

Nattaporn Ice Cream has received numerous awards and recognitions, including being featured in the Louis Vuitton City Guide as a recommended ice cream parlor in Bangkok.

== Gallery ==
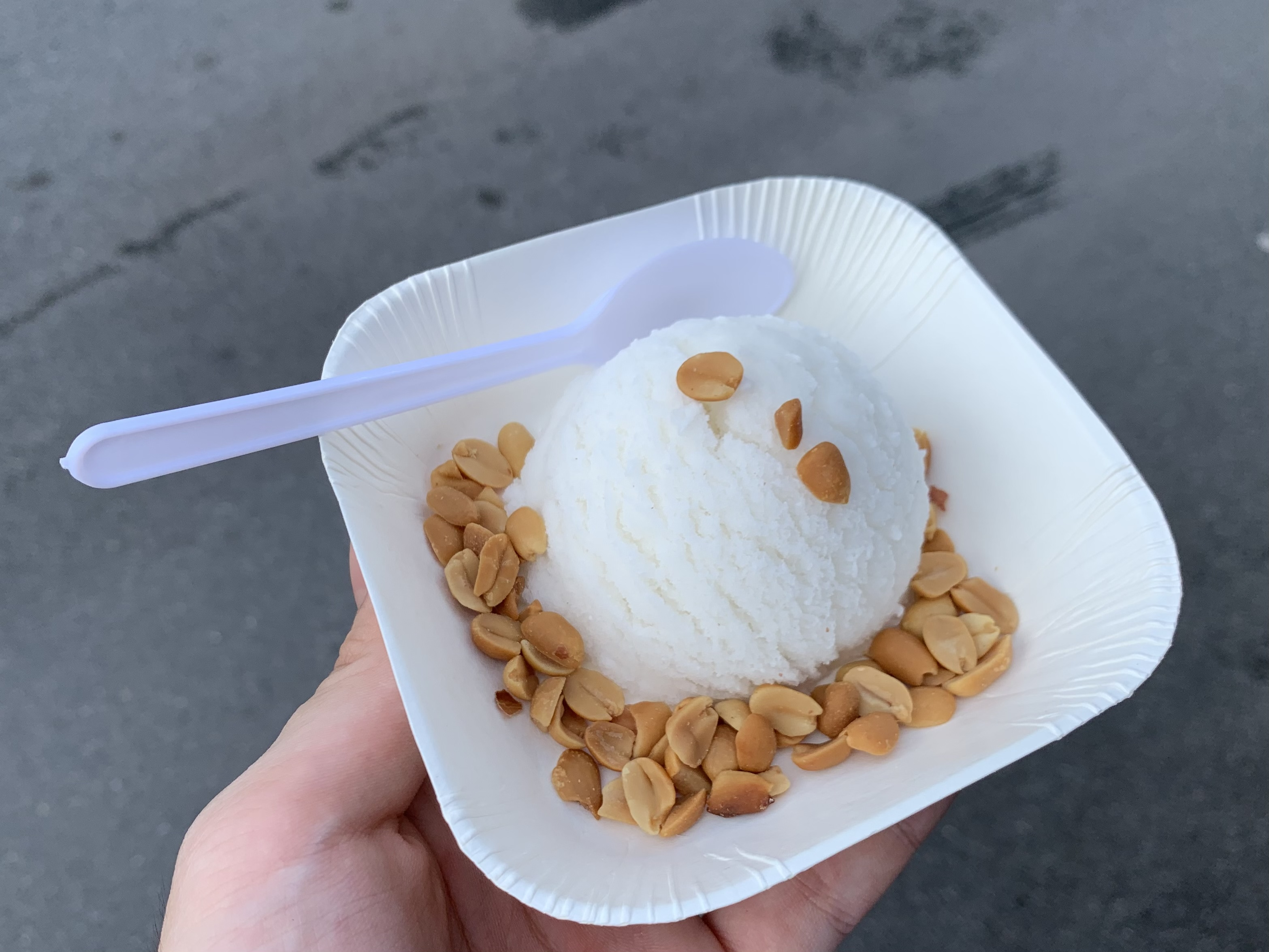
Fresh coconut ice cream topped with crunchy roasted peanuts

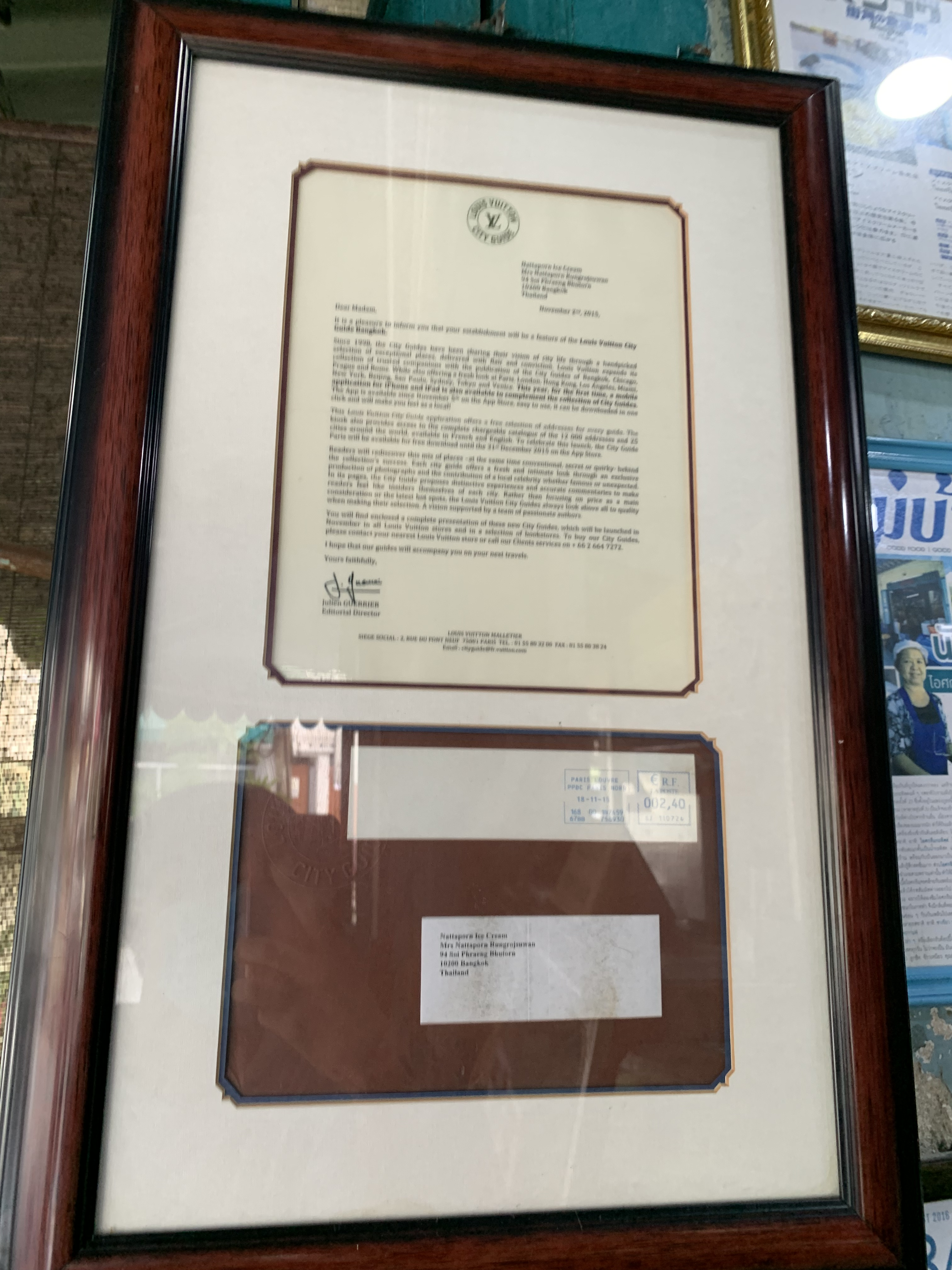
Signboard showing the parlor recommended by the Louis Vuitton City Guide
