= Chotechitr =

Coordinates: 13.752975°N 100.497871°E

Chotechitr โชติจิตร
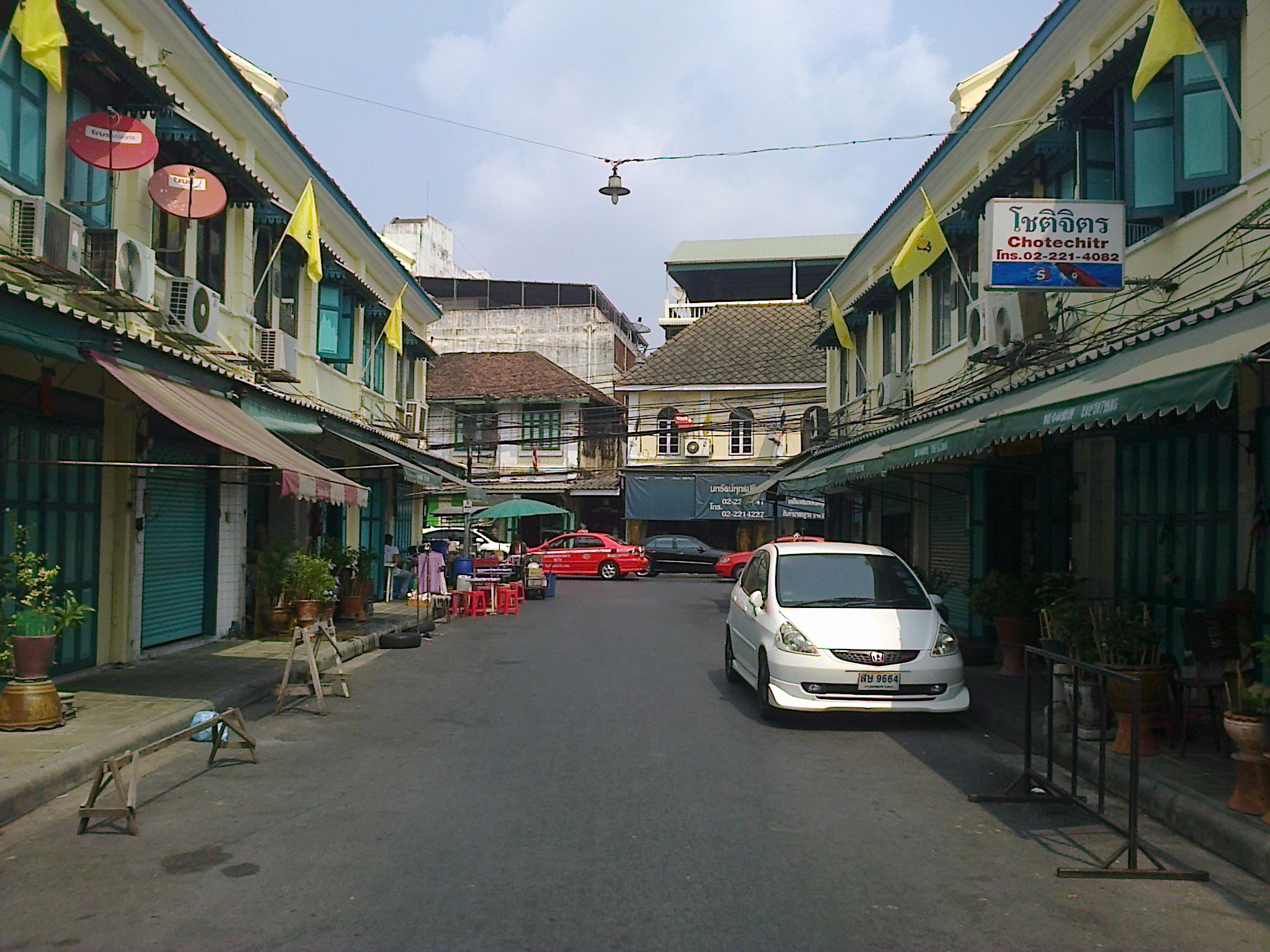
- Phraeng Phuthon in 2014, with Chotechitr located on the right-hand side (as indicated by the sign)
- Interactive map of Chotechitr โชติจิตร

Restaurant information
- Closed: Unknown
- Owner: Krachoichulee "Tim" Gimangsawat
- Previous owner: Chote Lhengsuwan
- Food type: Thai cuisine
- Dress code: Casual
- Location: 146 Tanao Road, San Chao Pho Suea, Phra Nakhon, Bangkok, 10200, Thailand

Chotechitr (Thai: โชติจิตร, pronounced [t͡ɕʰoː.tɕít]) was a cozy Thai restaurant tucked into a small, two-story shophouse with charming historic Sino-Portuguese architecture. It was located in Phraeng Phuthon, within the Sam Praeng area, close to the intersection leading out to Tanao Road on Rattanakosin Island, Bangkok.

== History ==
The restaurant had a long and storied history, dating back to the late reign of King Chulalongkorn (Rama V), making it over 100 years old. Passed down through three generations, the recipes remained unchanged since the founder, Chote Lheangsuwan, a military officer and expert in Thai herbs, opened it. Originally running a herbal medicine shop, Chote later infused his knowledge of herbs into the dishes. The restaurant was later run by his granddaughter, Krachoichulee "Tim" Gimangsawat.

Even though the restaurant was small, it offered more than 500 dishes, focusing mainly on traditional Thai cuisine, many of which were rare and hard to find elsewhere. Chotechitr gained international attention in 2017 when American actress Meghan Markle, who was then engaged to Prince Harry, Duke of Sussex, mentioned it in an interview. She told a website reporter during a 2016 interview:

"The shop's got about six tables. There's no Michelin star. It's not a fancy restaurant. I just took one bite of Pad Thai and, oh my god! What have I been eating all my life? This is what Pad Thai's supposed to taste like?"

About 60 to 70 percent of Chotechitr's customers were foreigners, coming from all over the world. Alongside visitors from Europe and America, many came from Asia, particularly China and Korea, often discovering the restaurant through word of mouth. The restaurant was also widely recommended by leading travel magazines and websites such as Lonely Planet and Travel, and it has received numerous awards from TripAdvisor. The owner was also quite proficient in English. Being a family-run spot, every detail was looked after personally. The restaurant also offered vegetarian options for those who don't eat meat, which are available year-round.

== At present ==
As of 2026, Chotechitr has closed down. Its original location has since been replaced by another restaurant in a similar style.
