= Narathip Praphanphong =

Vara Varnakara
- Prince Naradhip Prabandhabonse
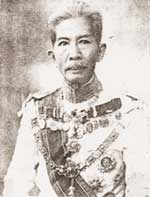
- Vara Varnakara, the Prince Naradhip Prabandhabongse

Deputy Minister of the Royal Treasury
- Born: 20 November 1861; Bangkok, Siam
- Died: 11 October 1931 (aged 69); Bangkok, Siam
- Spouse: Mom Luang Tuansri Voravan Na Ayudhya
- Issue: 21 sons and 14 daughters
Names
- His Royal Highness Prince Worawannakon, the Prince Narathip Praphanphong
- House: Voravan family (Chakri Dynasty)
- Father: Mongkut (Rama IV)
- Mother: Khian Sirivan

Prince Vara Varnakara, the Prince Naradhip Prabandhabongse (20 November 1861 – 11 October 1931) was a Prince of Siam (later Thailand). He was a member of Siamese royal family is a son of King Mongkut and Chao Chom Manda Khian. His mother was Chao Chom Manda Khian Sirivan (is a daughter of On Sirivan and Im Sirivan). His full name was Phra Chao Borommawong Thoe Phra Ong Chao Worawannakon Khommaphra Narathip Praphanphong (Thai: พระเจ้าบรมวงศ์เธอ พระองค์เจ้าวรวรรณากร กรมพระนราธิปประพันธ์พงศ์).

One of his sons is Prince Wan Waithayakon, who was the President of the Eleventh Session of the United Nations General Assembly (1956–1957). Prince Narathip died 11 October 1931 at the age 69.

== Children ==
1. Mom Chao (HSH Princess) Barabimalabanna Voravan (1890 - 1981), married to Rajani Chamcharas, the Prince Bidyalankarana.
2. Mom Chao (HSH Prince) Vanna Vaidhayakara (1891 - 1976), later inherited the title HRH the Prince Narathipong Praphan II. He was President of the Eleventh Session of the United Nations General Assembly (1956 - 1957).
3. Mom Chao (HSH Princess) Vanvimol Voravan (1892 - 1951), later renamed as HRH Princess Vallabhadevi, former fianceé of King Vajiravudh.
4. Mom Chao (HSH Princess) Vanbimol Voravan (1899 - 1961), later renamed as HRH Princess Lakshamilavan, royal consort of King Vajiravudh.
