= Pinklao =

Viceroy of Siam (1808–1866)

Pinklao; ปิ่นเกล้า
- Second King of Siam
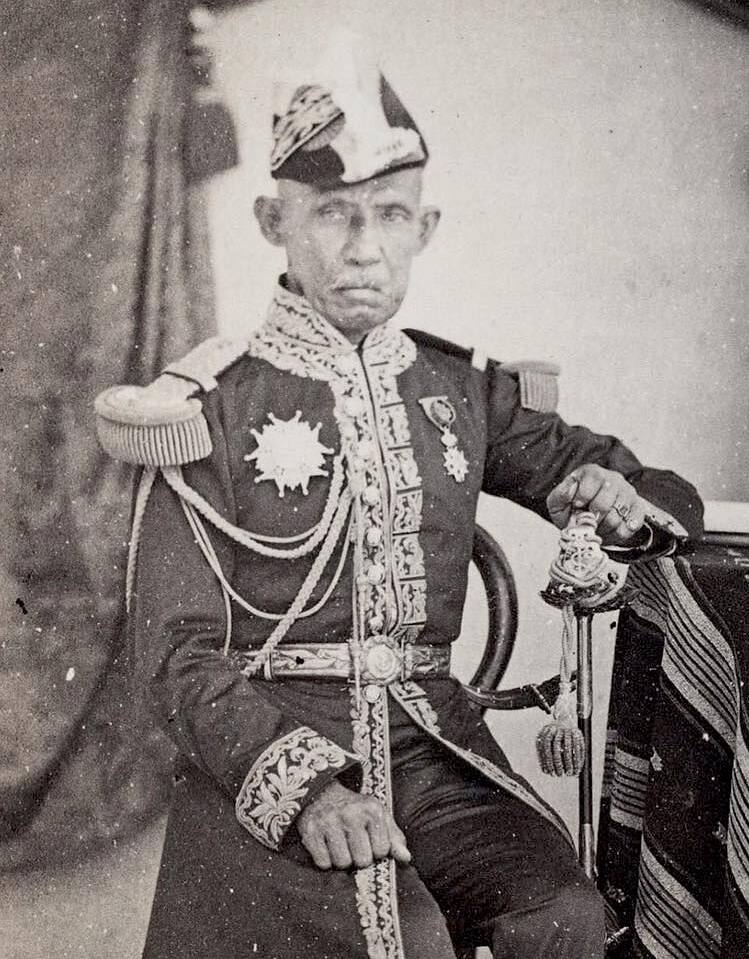
- Pinklao in western style (French) naval uniform

Viceroy of Siam
- Tenure: 25 May 1851 – 7 January 1866
- Appointer: Mongkut (Rama IV)
- Predecessor: Sakdiphonlasep
- Successor: Wichaichan (Yodyingyot)
- Born: Prince Chutamani; 4 September 1808; Thonburi, Siam
- Died: 7 January 1866 (aged 57); Bangkok, Siam
- Spouses: Chao Chom Manda Klib; Various consorts
- Issue: 58 sons and daughters, including: Yodyingyot, Prince Bowon Wichaichan
- Dynasty: Chakri
- Father: Phutthaloetla Naphalai (Rama II)
- Mother: Sri Suriyendra
- Religion: Theravada Buddhism

Standard of Pinklao, the Second King of Siam

Pinklao (Thai: ปิ่นเกล้า; 4 September 1808 – 7 January 1866) was the viceroy of Siam. He was the younger brother of Mongkut (Rama IV), who invested him with royal rank and honours equal to his own.

== Early life ==
Pinklao was born to Prince Itsarasunthon and Princess Bunrot at the Phra Racha Wang Derm (Thonburi Palace). He was the younger brother of Prince Mongkut, who was seven years his senior. In 1809, when Prince Itsarasunthon ascended the throne as King Rama II, his mother was elevated as Queen Sri Suriyendra, and the family moved to the Grand Palace.

The government of Rama II, however, was dominated by Kromma Meun Chetsadabodin, his son with Sri Sulalai. In 1824, Mongkut became a monk according to Thai traditions. However, Rama II fell ill and died in the same year. The nobility, led by Chao Phraya Abhay Pudhorn, the Prime Minister, and Prayurawongse, the Minister of Foreign Affairs, supported Chetsadabodin for the throne as he proved competent to rule. Chetsadabodin was crowned as Rama III.

Prince Mongkut then stayed in his monkhood to avoid political intrigues. Prince Chutamani, however, entered the government under Nangklao and was awarded the title "Kromma Khun Isaret-rangsant". Kromma Khun Isaret moved to the Thonburi Palace, where he lived with his mother Queen Sri Suriyendra until her death in 1836.

The young prince was, as was his elder brother, well disposed towards foreigners. In 1833 at age 25 and known to diplomatist Edmund Roberts as Chow-Phoi-Noi or Mom-fa-Noi, the prince secretly visited the mission house during Roberts' negotiations for the Siamese–American Treaty of Amity and Commerce, the United States' first treaty with Thailand. The prince was pleased and gratified with a nighttime visit to the man-of-war Peacock, during which the men mustered to quarters for naval exercises. Roberts stated that the prince spoke and wrote the English language with considerable fluency, and his pronunciation was correct.

== Reign with Mongkut ==
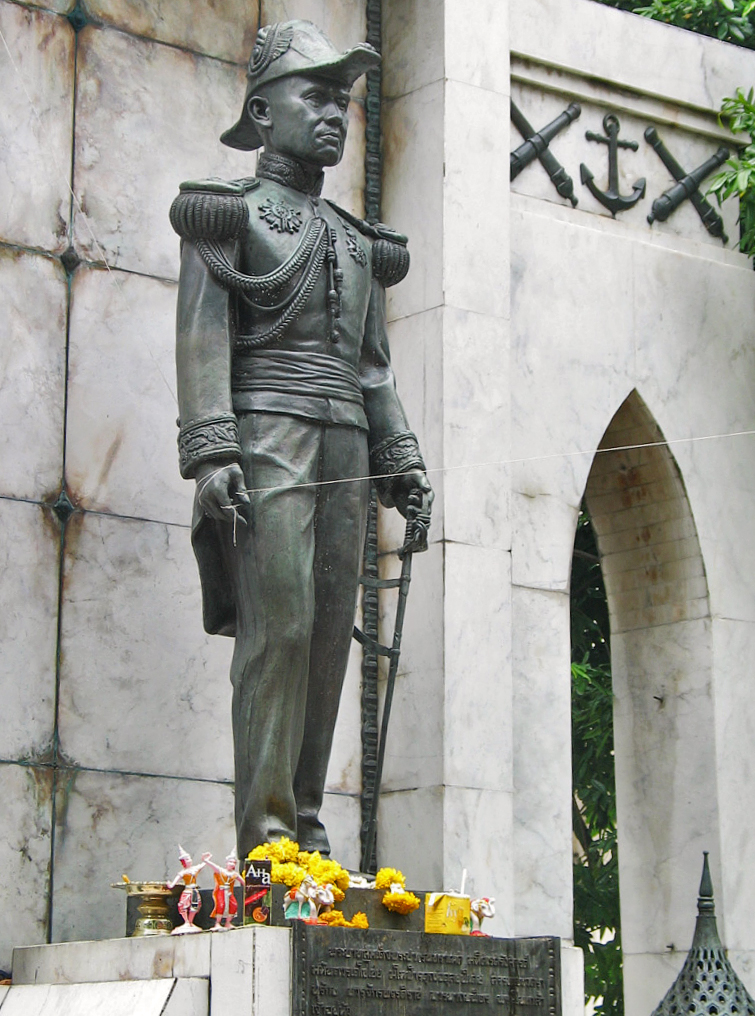
Statue of Phra Pinklao, viceroy of King Mongkut, near National Theatre

Nangklao died in 1851. Kromma Khun Isaret was at the time the heir presumptive to the throne, but the return and claim of his brother Prince Mongkut was stronger. Mongkut was then crowned on 25 May 1851, with the support of the nobility. Concurrently Prince Isaret was crowned as Uparaja Pinklao with equal honor to Mongkut. In practice, Pinklao held the title of Lord of the Front Palace. The popular legend holds that Mongkut's own astrological calculations stated that his brother Prince Isaret also held the "fate to become a king". As a result, he gave Pinklao the same styles and title normally reserved for a King such as Phrabat Somdet and Chao Yu Hua: Phrabat Somdet Phra Pinklao Chao Yu Hua. David Wyatt considers his appointment a way of Mongkut's to prevent Pinklao from challenging his own position. Nevertheless, the relationship between the brothers remained peaceful and good throughout Mongkut's reign.

The government under Mongkut was, however, in the strong hands of Prayurawongse and Pichaiyat, the former as Chief Minister of Siam. Interference from both King and Vice King was therefore minimal. Expanding his interests to foreign affairs Pinklao, who was known for his fluency in the English language was able to respond to the letters of John Bowring. In the letters, he referred himself as the Second king and his brother as the First king. As a result, Pinklao was able to play a great role in the negotiation of the Bowring Treaty of 1855, as well as a role in the subsequent negotiation of the Harris Treaty of 1856 that updated the Roberts treaty of 1833.

As the second monarch and Front Palace lord, Pinklao maintained his own private army, and a navy of several modern ships. It was during this time that the power of the Front Palace greatly expanded. Apart from state affairs, Pinklao was interested in both western and Lao culture, speaking English, drilling his troops in European fashion, singing, dancing, and playing the khene to mor lam music.

Pinklao died on 7 January 1866, predeceasing his brother by two years. His nephew the 15-year-old Chulalongkorn (son of Mongkut), succeeded to the throne in 1868 and Regent Somdet Chaophraya Sri Suriwongse arranged the title of Front Palace lord to be succeeded by Pinklao's son with Princess Aim, Prince Yingyot, later Wichaichan.

Personal seals of Pinklao, the Second King of Siam

Pinklao House of Chakri Born: 4 September 1808 Died: 7 January 1866
Regnal titles
Vacant Title last held by Sakdiphonlasep	Viceroy of Siam; 25 May 1851 – 7 January 1866	Vacant Title next held by Wichaichan
Military offices
First	Commander of the Front Palace Navy; 1851–1866	Succeeded by Wichaichan
