= Wat Bowon Sathan Sutthawat =

Buddhist temple in Bangkok, Thailand

- วัดบวรสถานสุทธาวาส
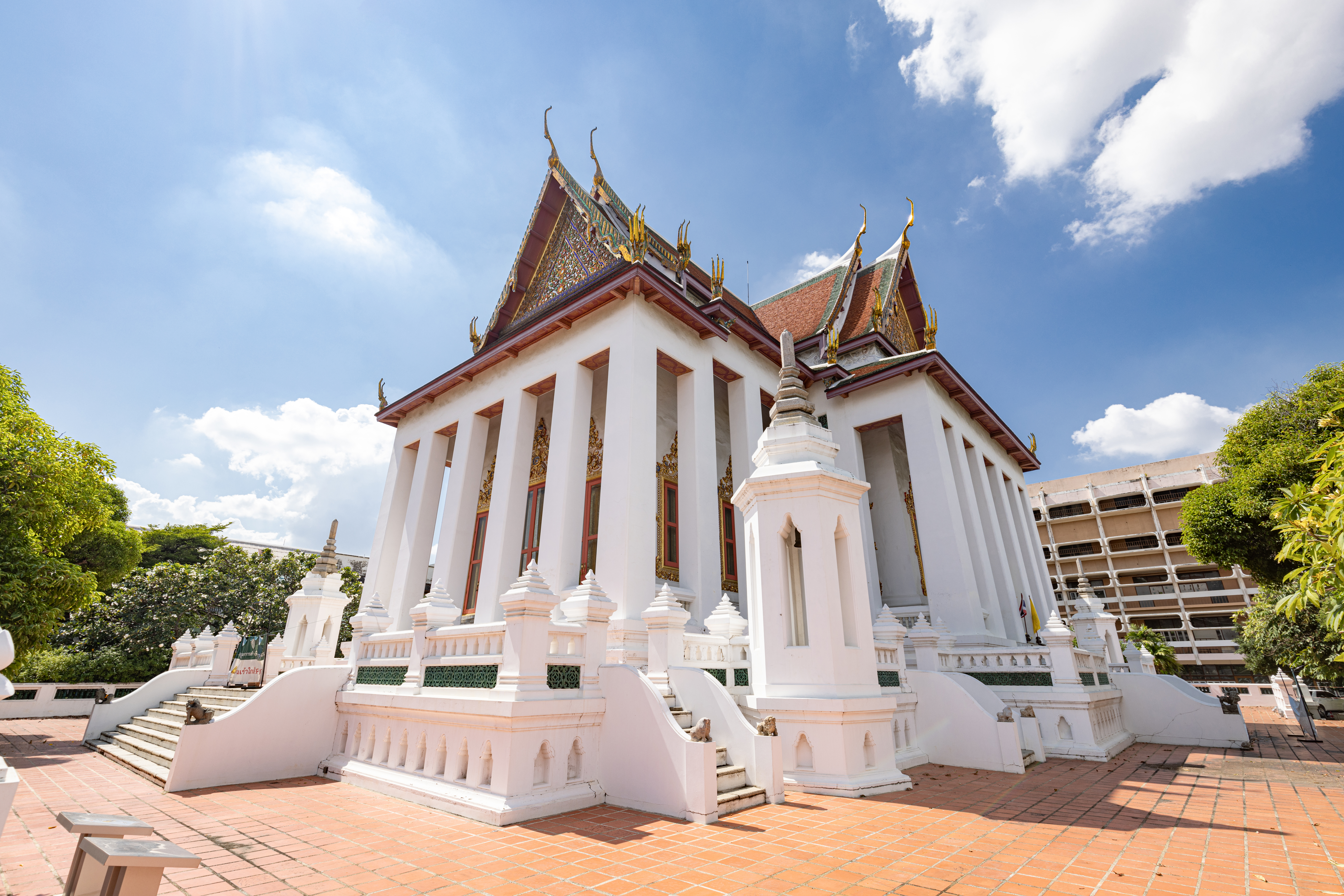
- Wat Bowon Sathan Sutthawat

- Location within Bangkok

Religion
- Affiliation: Theravada Buddhism

Location
- Location: Phra Nakhon, Bangkok
- Country: Thailand
- Interactive map of Wat Bowon Sathan Sutthawat
- Coordinates: 13°45′5″N 100°29′33″E

Wat Bowon Sathan Sutthawat (Thai: วัดบวรสถานสุทธาวาส) is a Buddhist temple in Bangkok, Thailand. It is a historic temple located within the grounds of the Front Palace (Wang Na), similar in function to Wat Phra Kaew inside the Grand Palace. Because the temple is situated within a royal palace, it has no resident monks.

Wat Bowon Sathan Sutthawat is situated at 4 Rachini Road, Phra Borom Maha Ratchawang Subdistrict, Phra Nakhon District, within the Bunditpatanasilpa Institute complex, opposite the entrance of Soi Rambuttri near Tha Chang Wang Na Pier and the Bangkok Tourism Division, adjacent to the National Theatre. The temple is also known as Wat Phra Kaew Wang Na (Thai: วัดพระแก้ววังหน้า, literally "Temple of the Emerald Buddha at the Front Palace").

== History ==
Located within the grounds of the Front Palace (Wang Na), on the eastern side of the complex, was the royal temple or chapel, Wat Bowon Sathan Sutthawat, commonly known as "Wat Phra Kaeo Wang Na". In function it was comparable to Wat Phra Kaeo in the Grand Palace: it served as the palace's own royal temple and therefore did not house a resident monastic community.

The site had previously been occupied by a small religious foundation known as "Wat Luang Chi", established by Prince Maha Surasinghanat, the Front Palace under King Rama I, as a convent for royal consorts and attendants of Khmer origin to take vows and reside as nuns. By the reign of King Rama II the establishment had declined, and Prince Maha Senanurak, his successor as Front Palace, had the old structures dismantled and converted the grounds into a rabbit garden.

During the reign of King Rama III, Prince Maha Sakdiphonlasep (who then held the Front Palace title) dedicated this former rabbit garden for the foundation of a new royal temple, which he named "Wat Bowon Sathan Sutthawat". The foundation was both an act of religious merit and, according to contemporary accounts, a vow of thanksgiving following his role in suppressing the Lao rebellion at Vientiane in 1825. Construction began under his patronage with plans for an elaborate ordination hall (ubosot), but he died in 1832 before the work was completed.

The project was subsequently continued by Somdet Phra Pinklao (King Pinklao) and then by King Mongkut (Rama IV). Pinklao intended to install the revered image Phra Phuttha Sihing in the new ubosot, and ordered the creation of a spired busabok-style throne in the centre of the hall together with a full mural programme. Prince Isarapong was tasked with having murals painted on all four interior walls, depicting the legend of Phra Phuttha Sihing and the Twenty-Eight Buddhas, while Hindu deities were painted on the shutters of doors and windows. Pinklao died in 1866 before this plan was realised; King Mongkut oversaw the completion of the remaining work.

Architecturally, the ubosot is a masonry hall in early Rattanakosin court style. It is a rectangular structure with projecting porches on all four sides and is raised on a two-tier base reached by stairways on each side. The exterior walls are pierced by tall, evenly spaced windows; the gables are decorated with intricate stucco floral motifs inlaid with coloured glass and mirror; and the multi-tiered, four-gabled roof is finished with gilded bargeboards and finials in traditional Thai form. Inside, the principal image is a standing bronze Buddha in the attitude of bestowing pardon, lacquered and gilded, enshrined beneath the spired busabok throne. The interior murals, commissioned in the mid-nineteenth century, narrate episodes from the Phra Phuttha Sihing legend, scenes from the Buddha's previous lives, and royal processions and pageantry, and are regarded as a notable surviving example of high court painting from that period. The Fine Arts Department often uses the ubosot for rituals such as wai khru (teacher appreciation ritual), krob khru (teacher initiation ritual), and other sacred ceremonies to do with traditional dance and musical artists.

=== Phra Meru Phiman ===
During the reign of King Chulalongkorn (Rama V), the office of the Front Palace (Krom Phra Ratchawang Bowon Sathan Mongkhon) was abolished, and Maha Vajirunhis was elevated as Crown Prince of Siam instead. The Front Palace thus ceased to serve as the residence of the Front Palace titular. As a result, the palace complex fell into disrepair. King Chulalongkorn ordered the demolition of the fortifications and walls of the Front Palace, but ubosot of Wat Bowon Sathan Sutthawat was preserved.

After the death of Crown Prince Maha Vajirunhis, King Chulalongkorn ordered that the ordination hall of Wat Bowon Sathan Sutthawat be used as a phra meru phiman (royal funeral hall) to house his body during the period of ceremonial lying in state and royal merit-making in 1900 (Rattanakosin Era 118). The ordination hall thus became known as "Phra Meru Phiman". At the same time, the king also ordered the construction of a smaller crematorium (phra meru noi) to the north of the ordination hall for the actual royal cremation. This smaller crematorium was later used for the cremation of several members of the royal family, including:

- Somdet Phra Maha Samana Chao Krom Phraya Pavares Variyalongkorn
- Somdet Phra Boromma Orasathirat Chao Fa Maha Vajirunhis, Crown Prince of Siam
- Somdet Phra Chao Borommawong Thoe Chao Fa Sommatiwongse Varodaya, Krom Khun Sritammaracha Thamrongrit
- Somdet Phra Chao Borommawong Thoe Chao Fa Sirabhorn Sobhon Phimonratnawadi
- Somdet Phra Boromma Ratchamata Mahaiyika Thoe Krom Phra Sudaraksara Rajayindra
- Somdet Phra Chao Borommawong Thoe Chao Fa Chaturon Rasmi, Krom Phraya Chakrabongse
- Somdet Phra Ariyavongsagatanana (Sa Pussadevo)

== Gallery ==
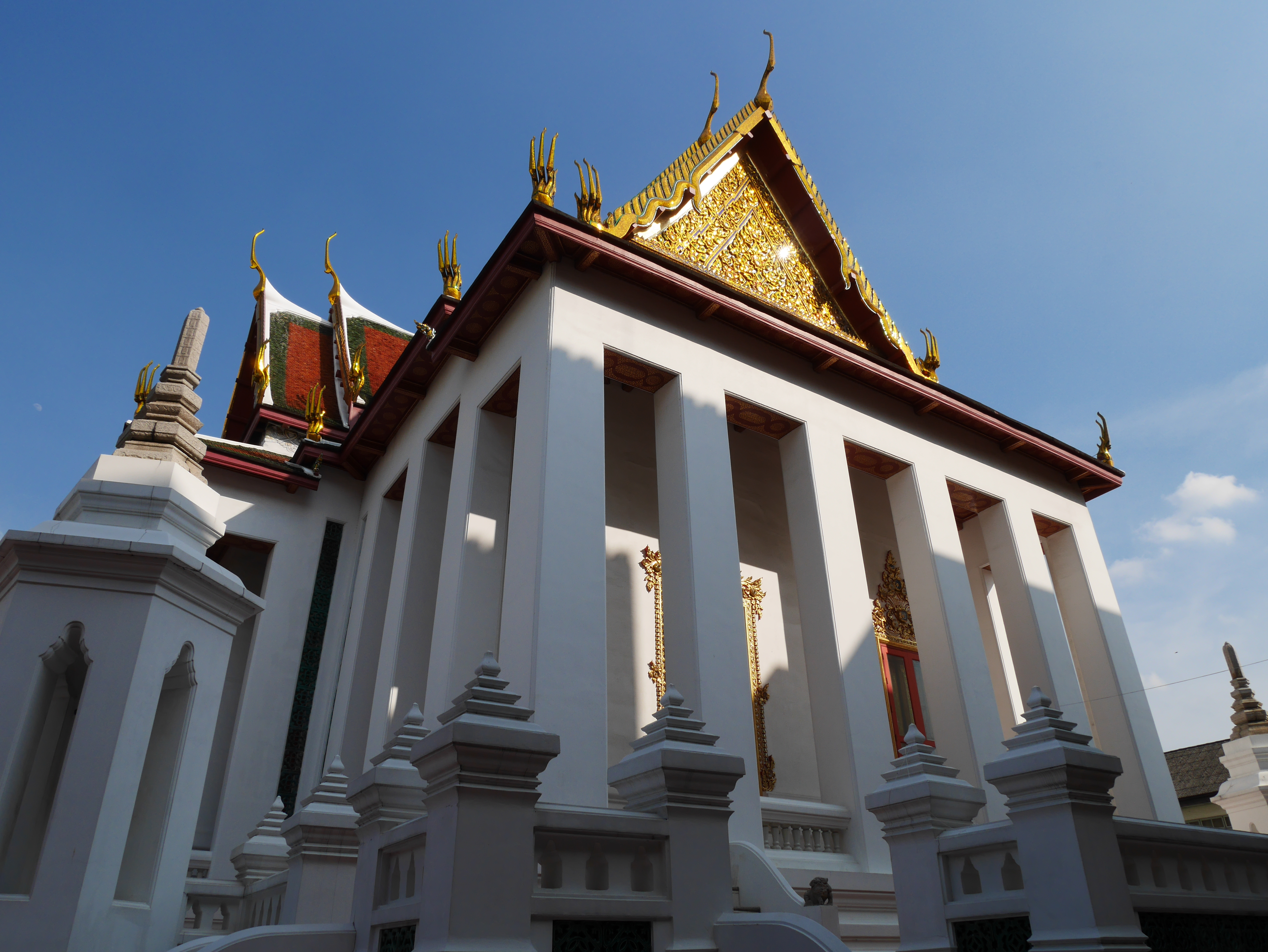
The ordination hall (ubosot)

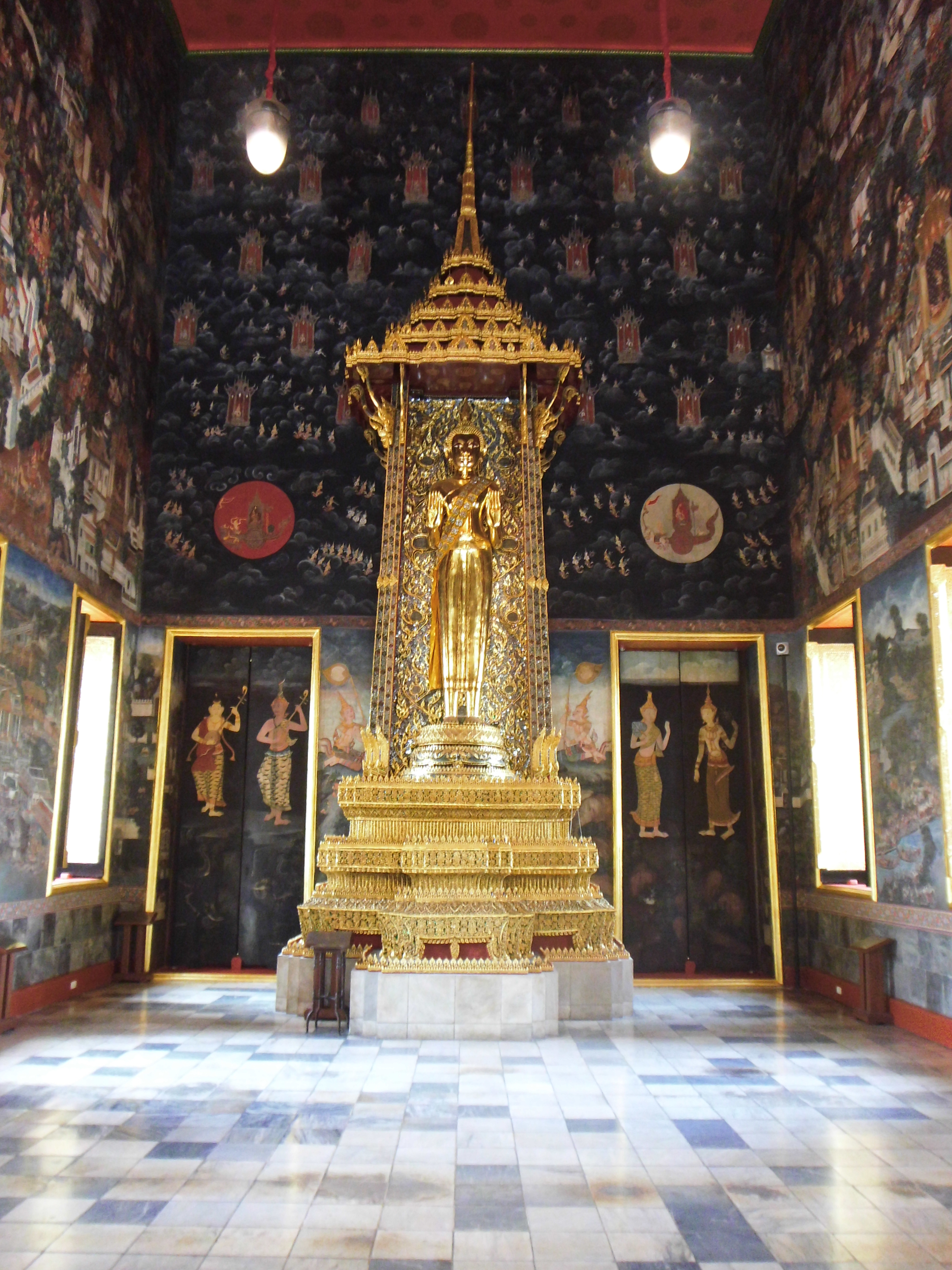
Principal Buddha image inside the ordination hall of Wat Bowon Sathan Sutthawat

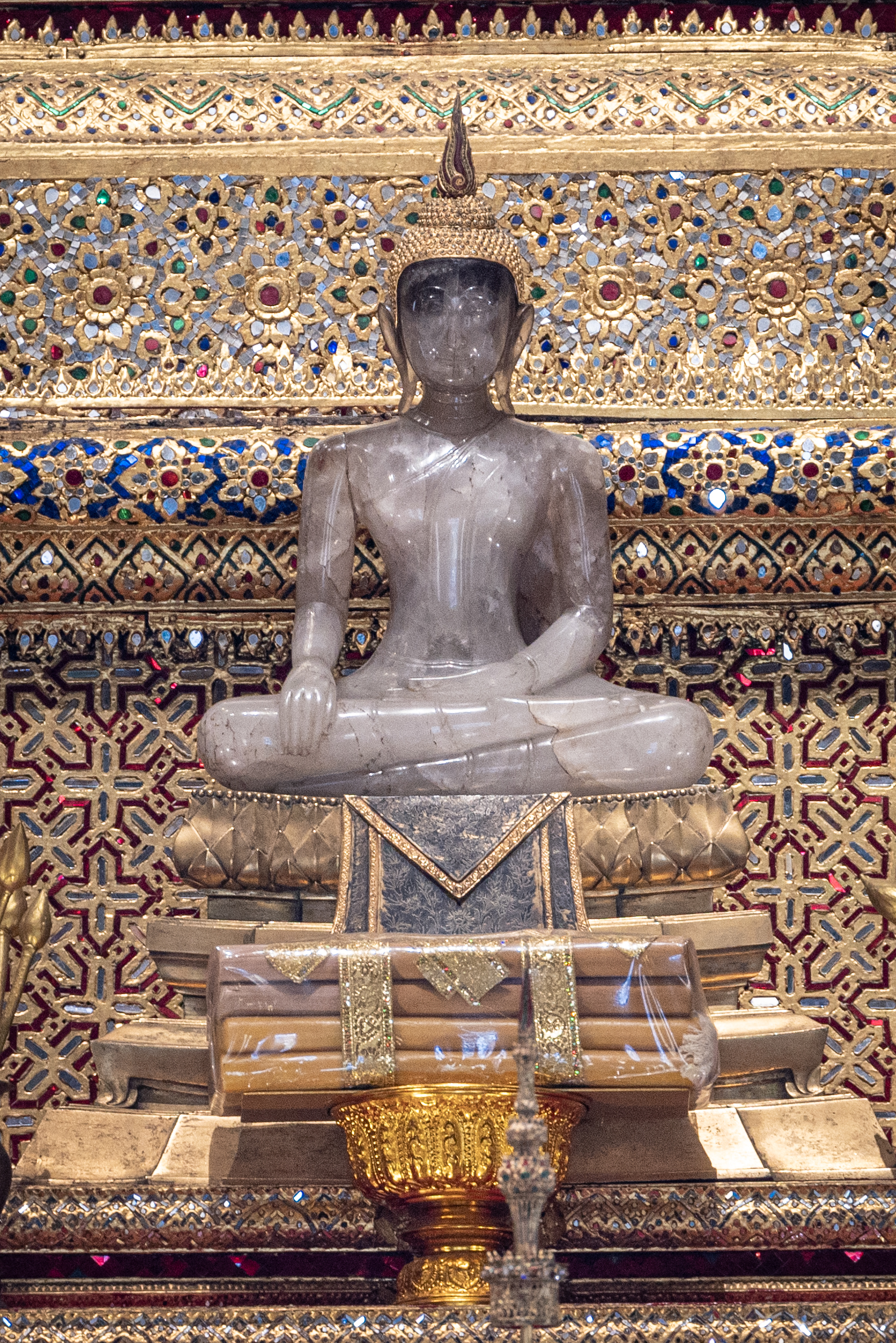
The Emerald Buddha of the Front Palace is now enshrined in the ubosot of Wat Phra Si Rattana Satsadaram.
