= National Theatre (Thailand) =

Theatre in Bangkok, Thailand

Coordinates: 13°45′32″N 100°29′32″E

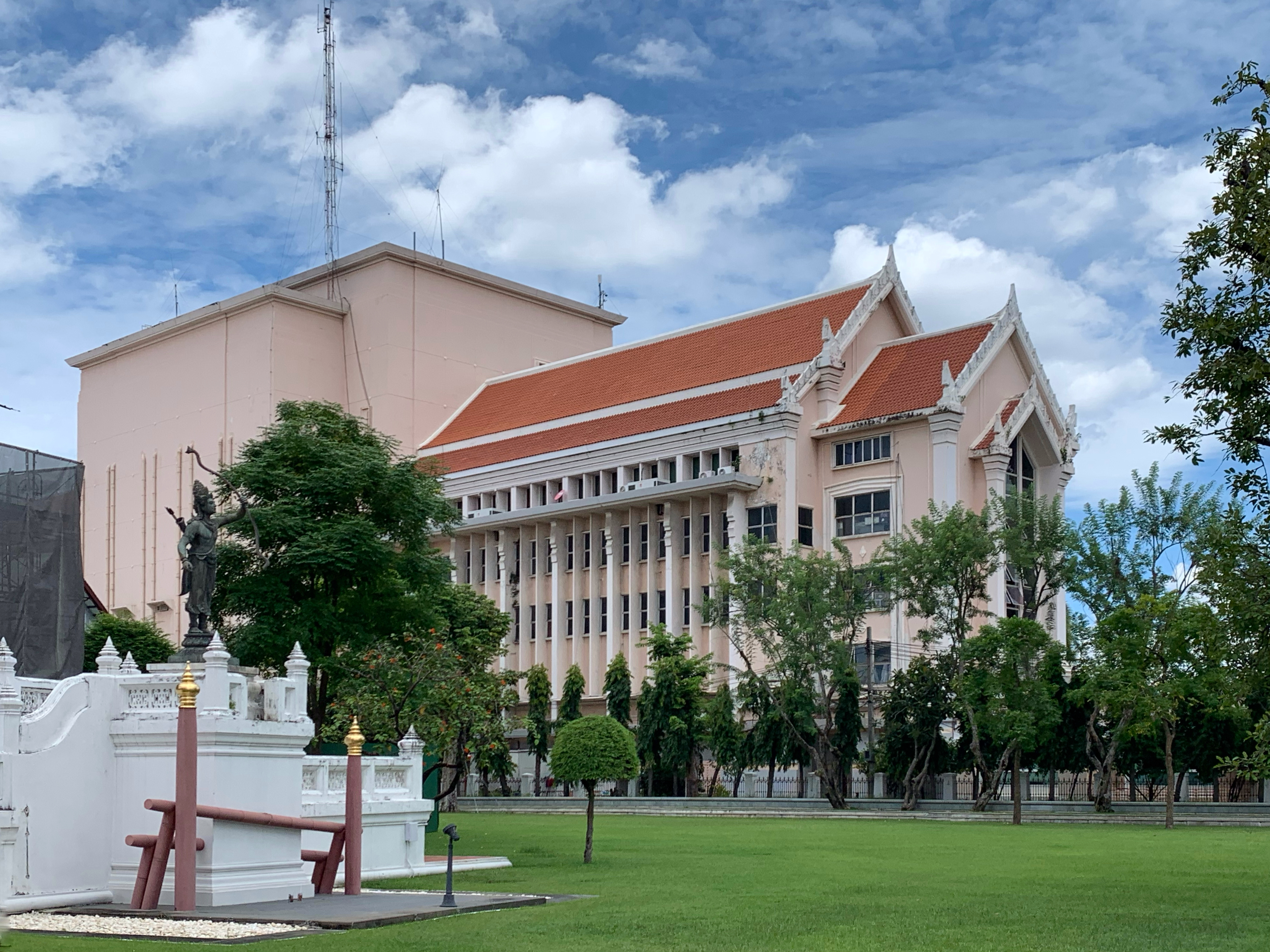
The National Theatre, as seen from Bangkok National Museum

The National Theatre is a performing arts venue in Bangkok's Phra Nakhon District. It opened in 1965, and operates as a government agency under the Office of Performing Arts of the Fine Arts Department. Today, it is best known for traditional performances, especially of the khon masked dance.

The theatre was built from 1960 to 1965, beginning under the supervision of Luang Wichit Wathakan, the prolific author and playwright who contributed much to the development of Thai nationalist discourse during the mid-20th century. The building was designed in applied Thai style, with a modernist plan superimposed with a traditional-Thai-influenced gabled roof. It sits on the corner of Rachini and Na Phra That roads, near the northern end of Sanam Luang, on the former location of the Ministry of Transport, and occupies grounds originally part of the Front Palace, next to the Bangkok National Museum and the Bunditpatanasilpa Institute.
