= Phra Phuttha Sihing =

Statue of the Gautama Buddha in Thailand

- พระพุทธสิหิงค์ (Thai)
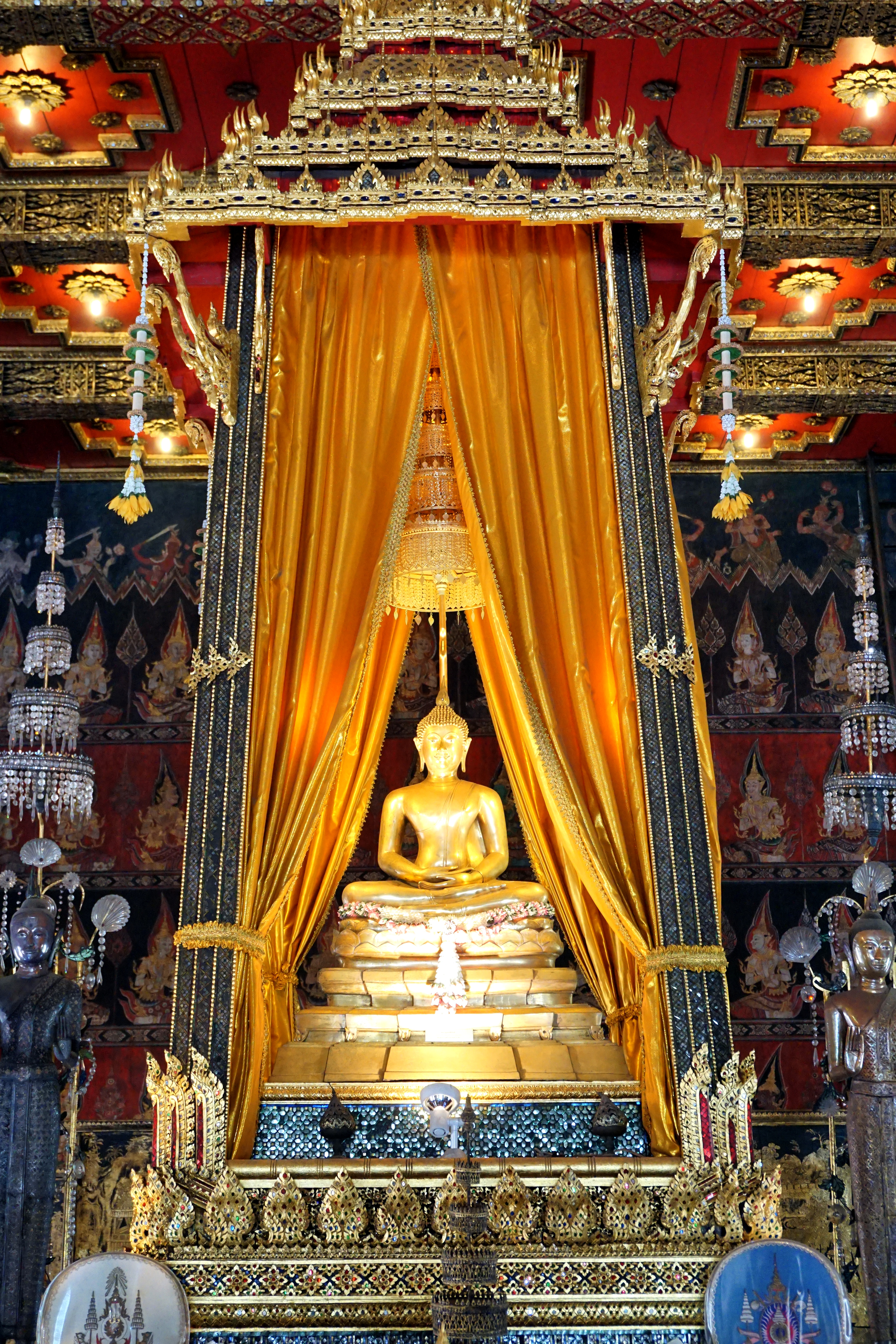
- Artist: Unknown
- Year: 15th Century
- Medium: Bronze and gold
- Dimensions: 79 cm × 63 cm (31 in × 25 in)
- Location: Phutthaisawan Hall, Bangkok National Museum, Bangkok; 13°45′30″N 100°29′30″E

The Phra Phuttha Sihing (Thai: พระพุทธสิหิงค์) is a highly revered image of the Gautama Buddha in Bangkok, Thailand, second in importance only after the Emerald Buddha. The image is currently housed at the Phutthaisawan Hall (formerly a part of the Front Palace), now the Bangkok National Museum. The image was brought to Bangkok from Wat Phra Singh, Chiang Mai in 1795 by Viceroy Maha Sura Singhanat, the brother of King Rama I.

== History ==
The provenance of the Phra Phuttha Sihing image is still in question. The name Sihing comes from Sinhala the name of several kingdoms in Sri Lanka. According to legend the Phra Phuttha Sihing image was created in Sri Lanka around 157 A.D. and was brought to Thailand in 1307 to Sukhothai. Later it was relocated to Phitsanulok, Ayutthaya in 1378, Kamphaeng Phet in 1382 and Chiang Rai in 1388, before it was brought back to Ayutthaya again and then back to Chiang Mai in 1407, where it was enshrined at Wat Phra Singh. When King Narai conquered Chiang Mai in 1662, he brought the Buddha image back to Ayutthaya, where it was enshrined for 105 years at Wat Phra Si Sanphet until the Fall of Ayutthaya in 1767, following which, the people of Chiang Mai brought the Buddha Sihing image back to Chiang Mai.

In 1795, the image was taken from Chiang Mai by King Rama I and his brother the Viceroy Maha Sura Singhanat to Bangkok, as war booty. At first, the image was enshrined at the Front Palace of the Viceroy; after his death in 1803, the image was moved to the Wat Phra Kaew in the Grand Palace by Rama I. It remained there until 1851, when King Mongkut raised his younger brother Prince Chutamani to the unprecedented rank of Second King Pinklao. In order to celebrate the newly elevated status of Pinklao, King Mongkut gave the Second King the Phra Phuttha Sihing image. Considered the second most important Buddha image after the Emerald Buddha. The image was then taken back to the Front Palace (now the palace of Pinklao), where it was housed in the Phutthaisawan Hall, where it remains today.

Apart from the aforementioned image in Bangkok, at least two other images in Thailand are identified with the Phra Phutta Sihing. One at Hor Phrabhut Sihing, Nakhon Si Thammarat and the other at Wat Phra Singh, Chiang Mai.

== Description ==
The image is of the Buddha seated in the meditative posture (vajrāsana or meditation attitude), a stance commonly associated with Buddhist art found in Sri Lanka. This image was made of cast bronze and gilded with gold. The image was sculpted in classic Lan Na and Sukhothai style, but using Singhalese iconography. The images's facial features and long fingers are indicative of classic Lan Na style. The Sukhothai characteristics seems to manifest in the image's full cheeks and hooked nose.

Along with these classical features, the image shows features that is suggestive of its northern origins. The removable finial on top of the head, the small spiky hair curls, the raised area above the upper lip, dimpling at the corner of the mouth and the style of the shawl began to appear in Lan Na images around 1480s - 1500s. The proof of the image's northern manufacture is in the Lotus throne, the pedestal with its lotus petal decorations, the filament making vertical striations and the anther or head creating a beaded rim to the plinth. These are features found only in Lan Na art.

The crystal flame finial on the top of the head is unusual, since most bronze images will have a bronze finial. In Lan Na however the finials are cast separately and is removable, whereas in Sukhothai the whole image is always cast whole. The crystal material used for the image's flame finial is indicative of the special status of the image.

== Gallery ==
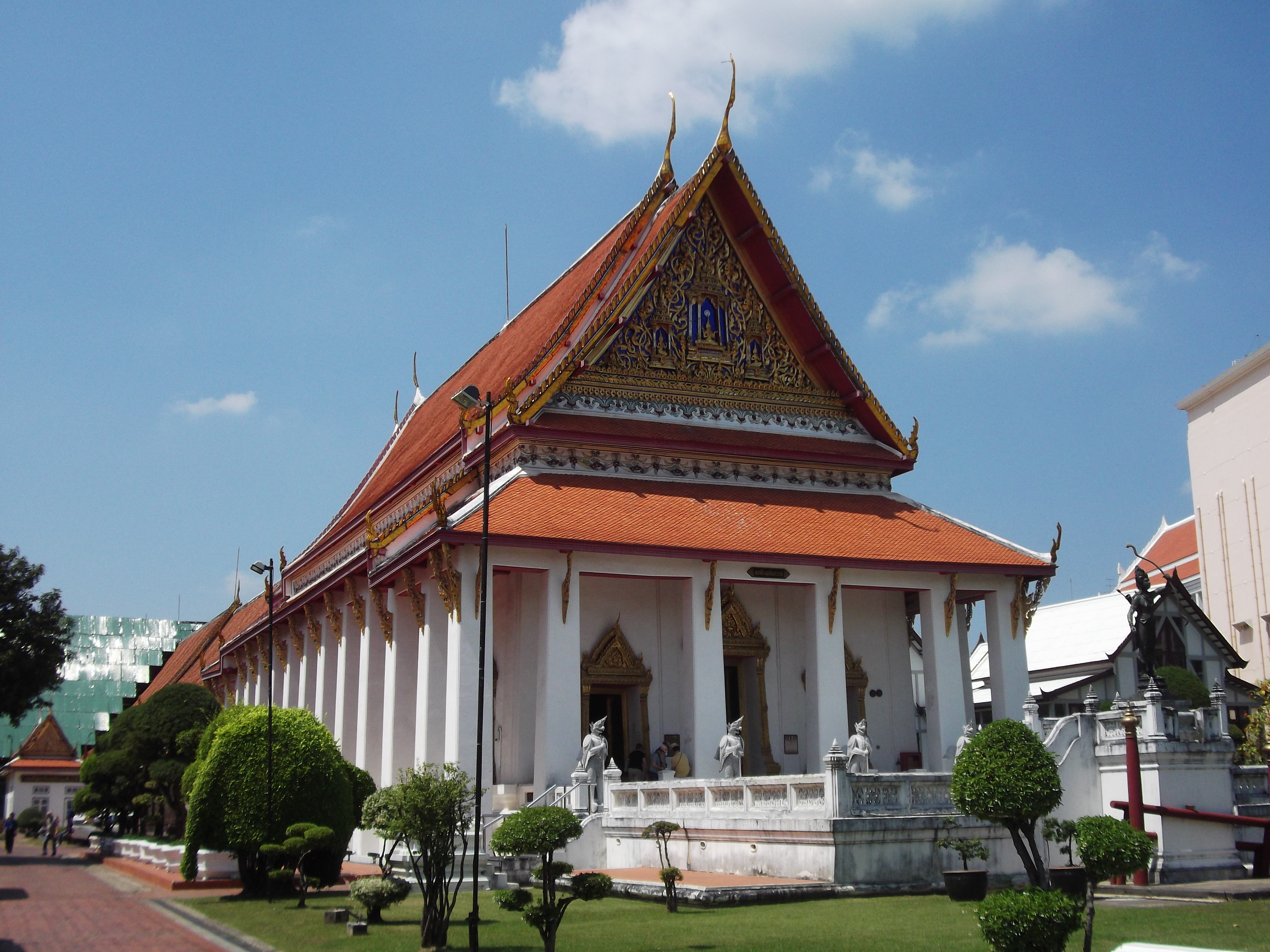
The Phutthaisawan Throne Hall (formerly a part of the Front Palace), now the Bangkok National Museum.

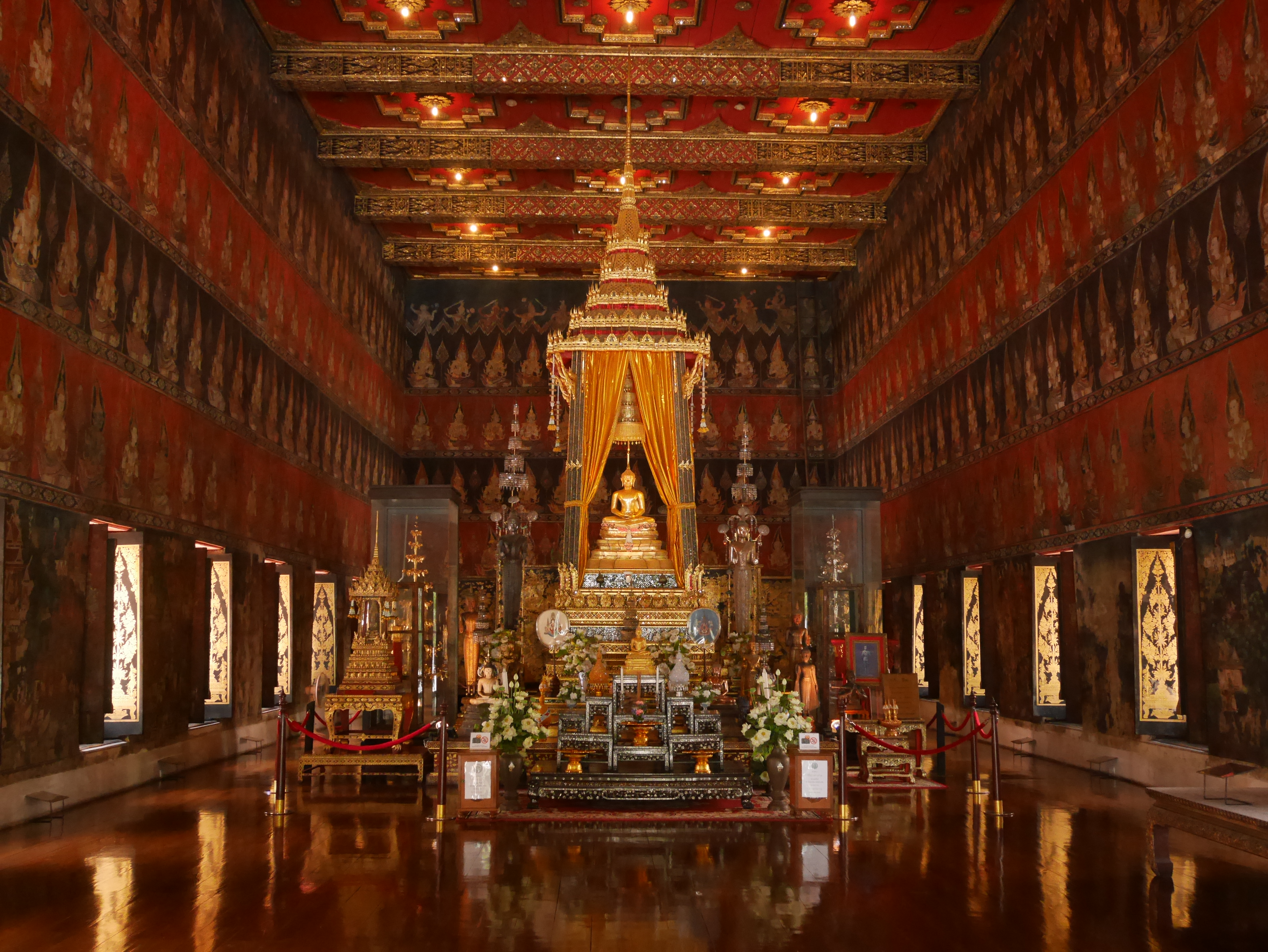
The interior of the Phutthaisawan Throne Hall with the Phra Phuttha Sihing in the central place of worship.

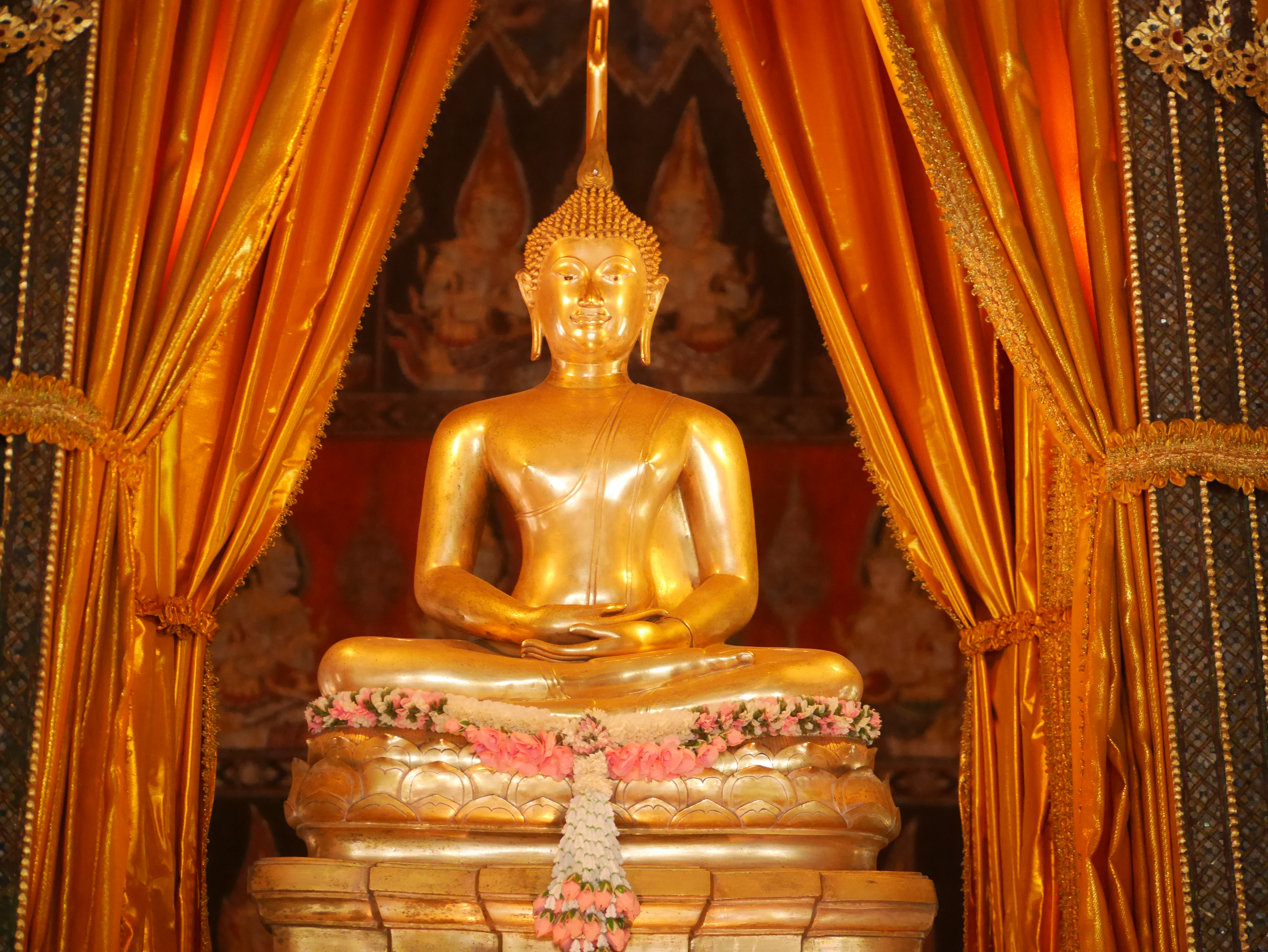
The Phra Phuttha Sihing in Bangkok

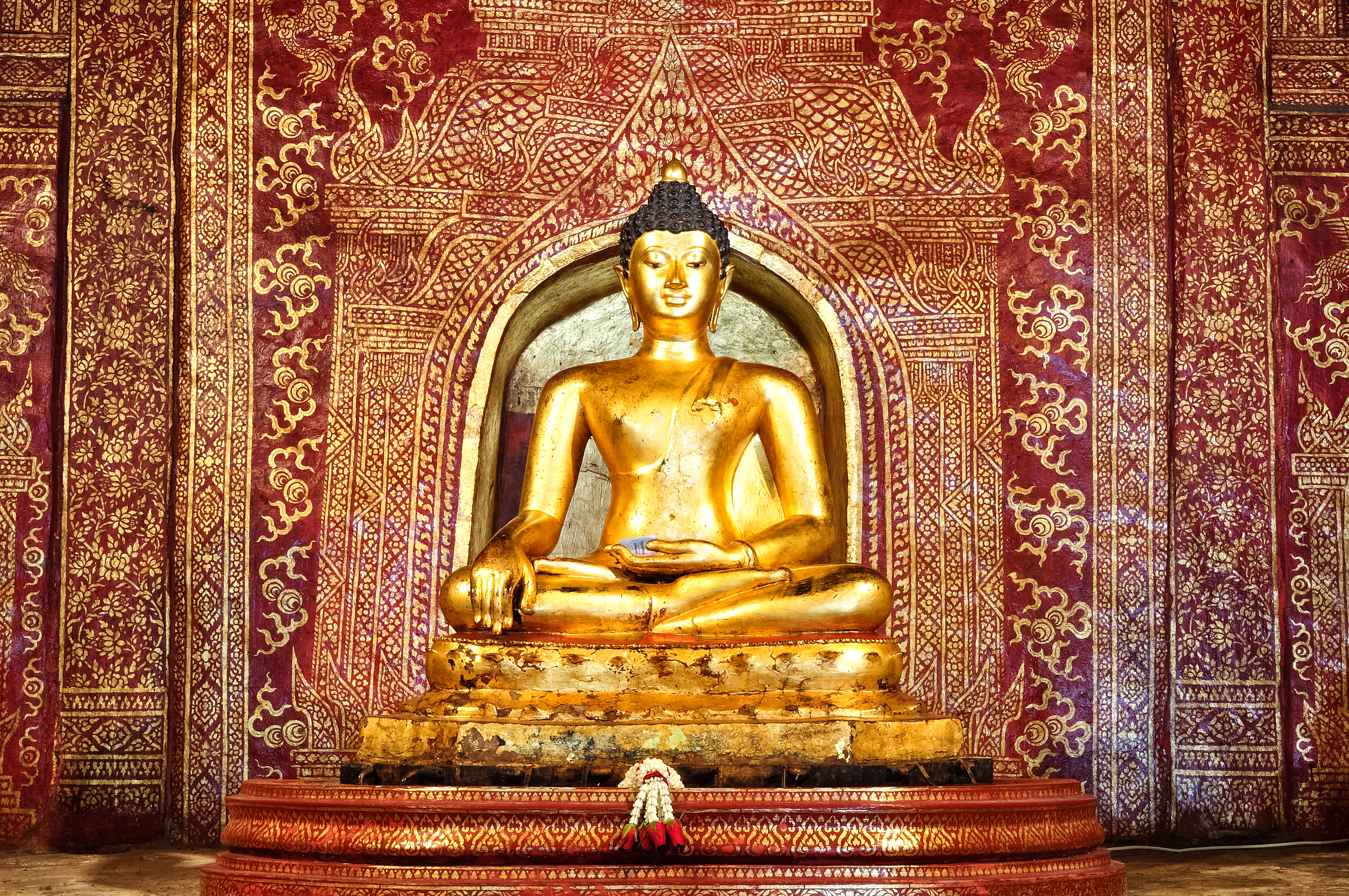
The Phra Phuttha Sihing or Phra Singh (Thai: พระสิงห์) at Wat Phra Singh in Chiang Mai.

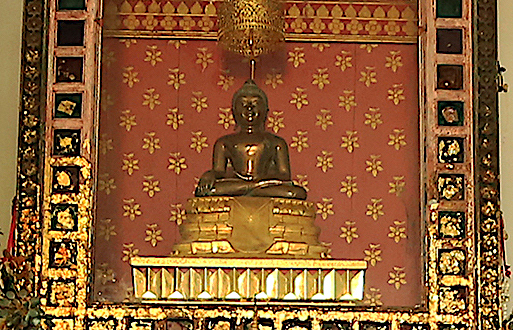
The Phra Phuttha Sihing at Hor Phrabhut Sihing at Nakhon Si Thammarat.

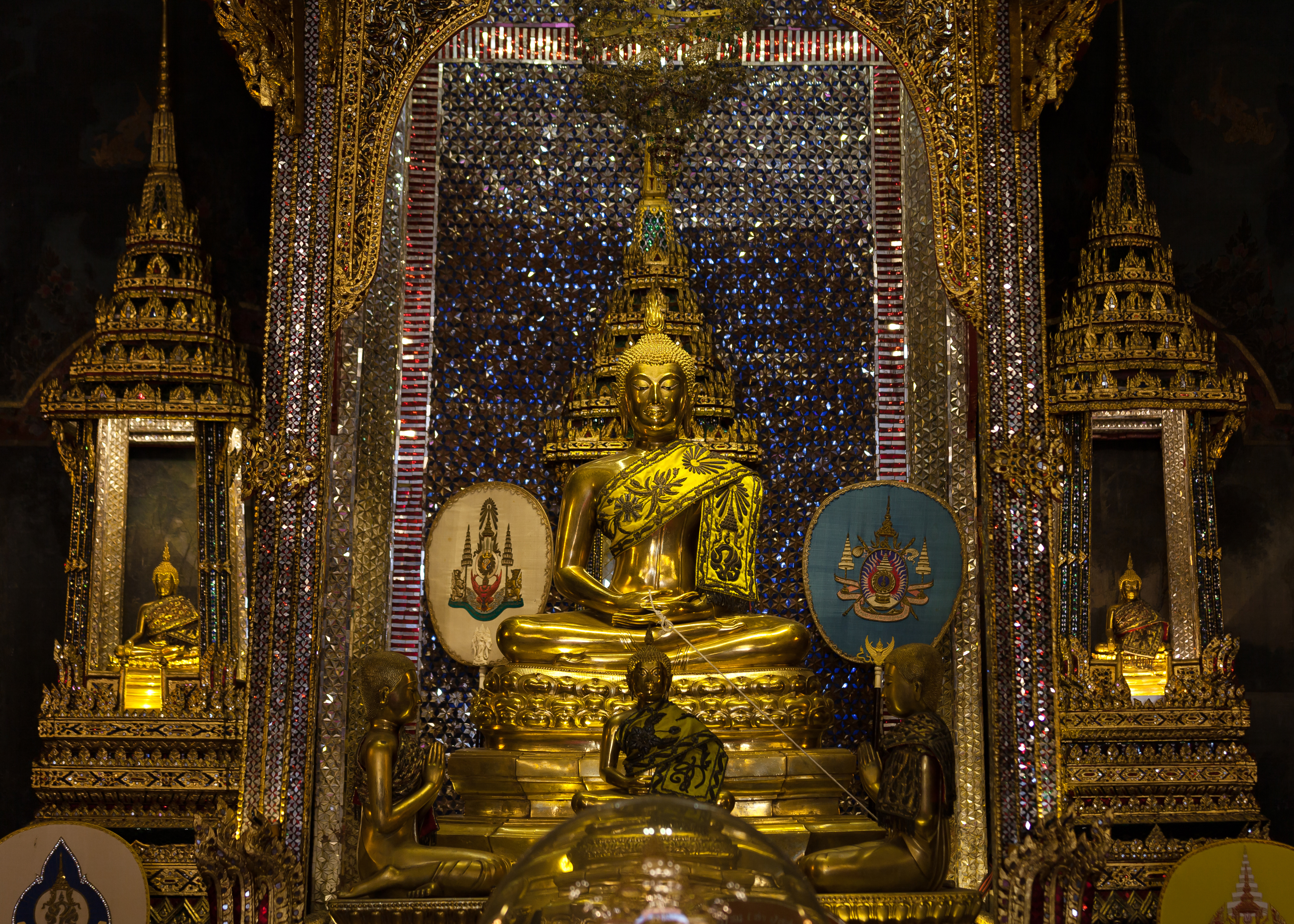
A replica of the Bangkok Phra Phuttha Sihing, used as the principal Buddha image of Wat Ratchapradit.

== See also ==
- Emerald Buddha
- Buddha images in Thailand
- Wat Phra Singh
- Front Palace (Bangkok)
- Bangkok National Museum
- Cāmadevivaṃsa
- Wat Bowon Sathan Sutthawat, interior wall murals depicting the legend of Phra Phuttha Sihing
