= Sanam Luang =

Public square in front of Wat Phra Kaew and the Grand Palace, Bangkok, Thailand

Sunam Luang
- สนามหลวง
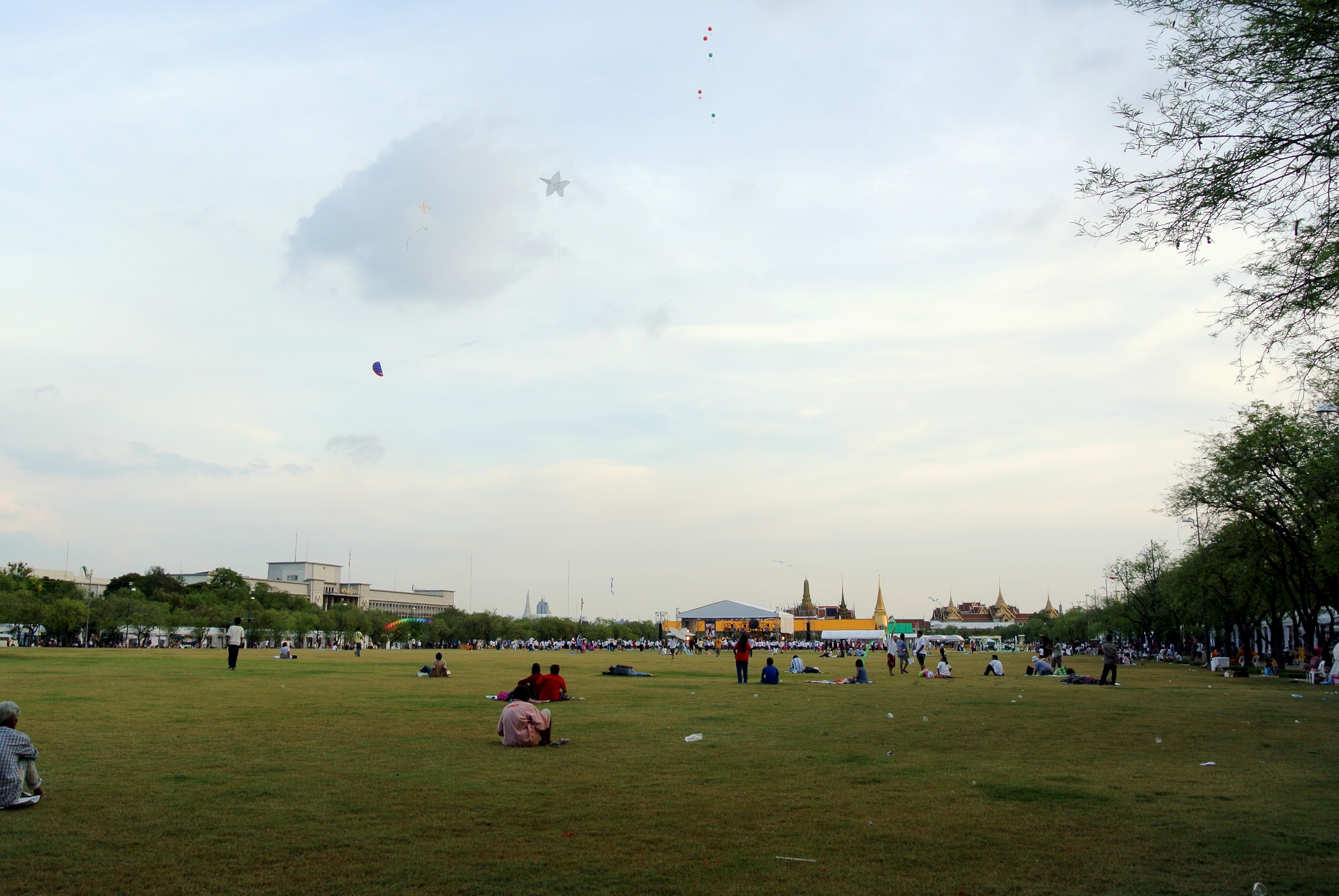
- Sanam Luang in 2013
- Interactive map of Sunam Luang
- Type: Stadium
- Location: Phra Borom Maha Ratchawang, Phra Nakhon, Bangkok, Thailand
- Coordinates: 13°45′18″N 100°29′35″E
- Area: 3,023 square wah
- Created: 1784
- Founder: Rama I
- Owner: Rama X
- Operator: Bangkok Metropolitan Administration
- Open: Every day; 5:00–22:00
- Plants: Tamarind

Sanam Luang (Thai: สนามหลวง, pronounced [sā.nǎːm lǔa̯ŋ]; lit. 'royal turf'), officially Thong Sanam Luang (Thai: ท้องสนามหลวง), is a 74.5 rai (119,200 m^{2}) open field and public square in front of Wat Phra Kaew and the Grand Palace, Bangkok, Thailand. Sanam Luang is in the Phra Nakhon District, the historic center of Bangkok.

In the Royal Chronicle, it was written that, "In front of Wat Mahathat, Sanam Luang lies between the Royal Palace and the Front Palace. When royal cremation was held at the Phra Men Ground, the pyre set up in the centre with the Royal Palace Pavilion to the south and that of the Prince of the Front Palace to the north. The music from the Royal Palace and from the Palace to the Front would be played on opposite sides of Sanam Luang".

Sanam Luang was officially known as "Thung Phra Men" (the royal cremation ground) (Thai: ทุ่งพระเมรุ). It has been used as a site for the cremation of kings, queens, and high-ranking princes since the reign of King Rama I. In 1855, King Rama IV changed its name from "Thung Phra Men" to "Thong Sanam Luang", in common usage now shortened to "Sanam Luang".

The Fine Arts Department lists Sanam Luang as a historical site.

== History ==
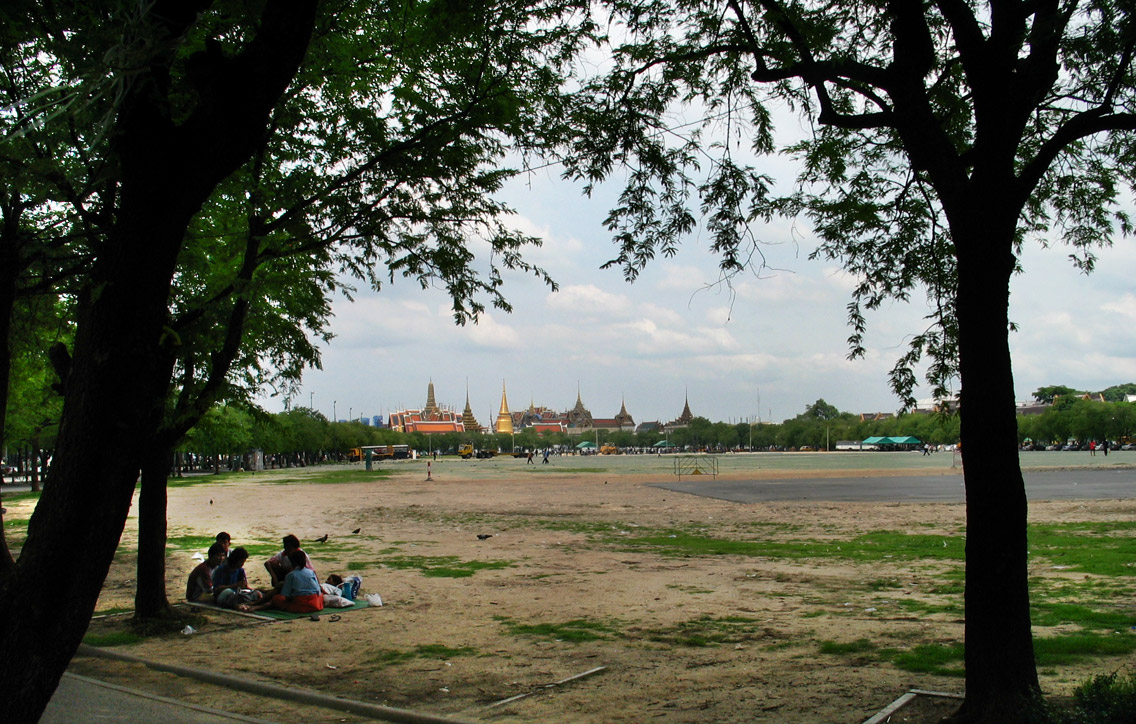
Evening picnic, Sanam Luang

Sanam Luang has been used since the time of King Rama I. It was the site of royal ceremonies and functions, including the cremation of the Front Palace, who was Rama I's brother. King Rama II followed this example of performing royal ceremonies there, including the cremation of the Front Palace of his reign, who was also his beloved brother. The Royal Chronicles mention the close link between the two brothers as follows:

"At the beginning of the season of the tradewind, the king flew a Chula kite (star-shaped kite) in front of the Temple of the Emerald Buddha and the Prince of the Palace to the Front flew a Pakpao kite (plain kite) at Sanam Luang".

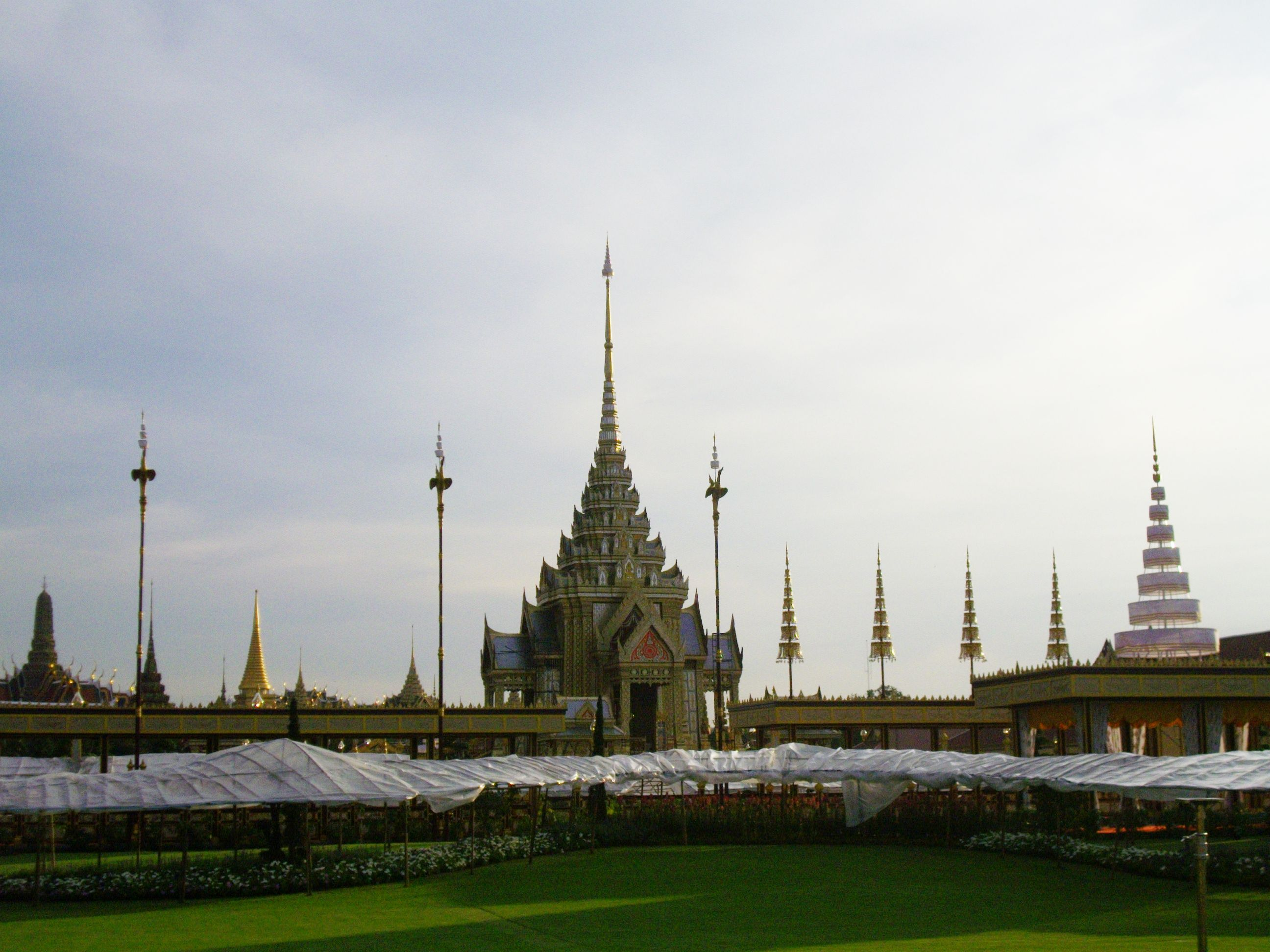
The crematorium of Princess Galyani Vadhana, Sanam Luang

During the reign of King Rama III, when Thailand was engaged in a conflict with Vietnam over the Cambodian border, the king wished to demonstrate to other nations that Thailand was such a fertile, flourishing country that even the area in front of the Grand Palace was cultivated. Sanam Luang was then a normal plot of land, used for growing rice. During the rainy season, the area would become waterlogged, creating pools of standing water that also served as a habitat for small animals such as frogs, crabs, and ricefield rats, which local people could catch for food. When there was a royal funeral, it would be smoothed over to prepare for the event.

King Rama IV set up a place for performing the Royal Ploughing Ceremony (Thai: พระราชพิธีพืชมงคลจรดพระนังคัลแรกนาขวัญ) where low walls were put up and a small hall was built to place the Buddha image for the ceremony. Pavilions and towers were built near the king's seat when he watched the ploughing ceremony. Next to the king's pavilion there was a stage where plays were performed as part of the ritual of propitiating the gods. Outside the wall there was a barn where the rice would be stored.

King Rama V enlarged Sanam Luang and pulled down all the buildings which were used for the ceremonies of former kings. In addition, it was no longer necessary to grow rice near the Royal Palace. The space was needed for the preparation of the centennial celebration of Bangkok in 1897 which took place soon after King Rama V's return from Europe. It was a grand celebration also corresponding to the king's fiftieth birthday. Following a visit to the Javanese court, where he was impressed by the gardens surrounding the sultan's place, Rama V ordered that two rows of tamarind trees be planted encircling Sanam Luang. Two additional rows were planted about 1967, bringing the total to 783 trees. Sanam Luang was still the place for kite flying. King Rama VI again used the place in the same manner as former kings to perform various ceremonies. Also, it was used as a racetrack, and golf course as more foreigners came to visit and stay in the country.

Sanam Luang and the nearby Thammasat University were the site of the 6 October 1976 massacre resulted from violent crackdown of left-wing protesters by right-wing militia and police. During that period and into the early 1980s, Sanam Luang also served as a weekend market venue before it was relocated to Chatuchak Weekend Market in 1982.

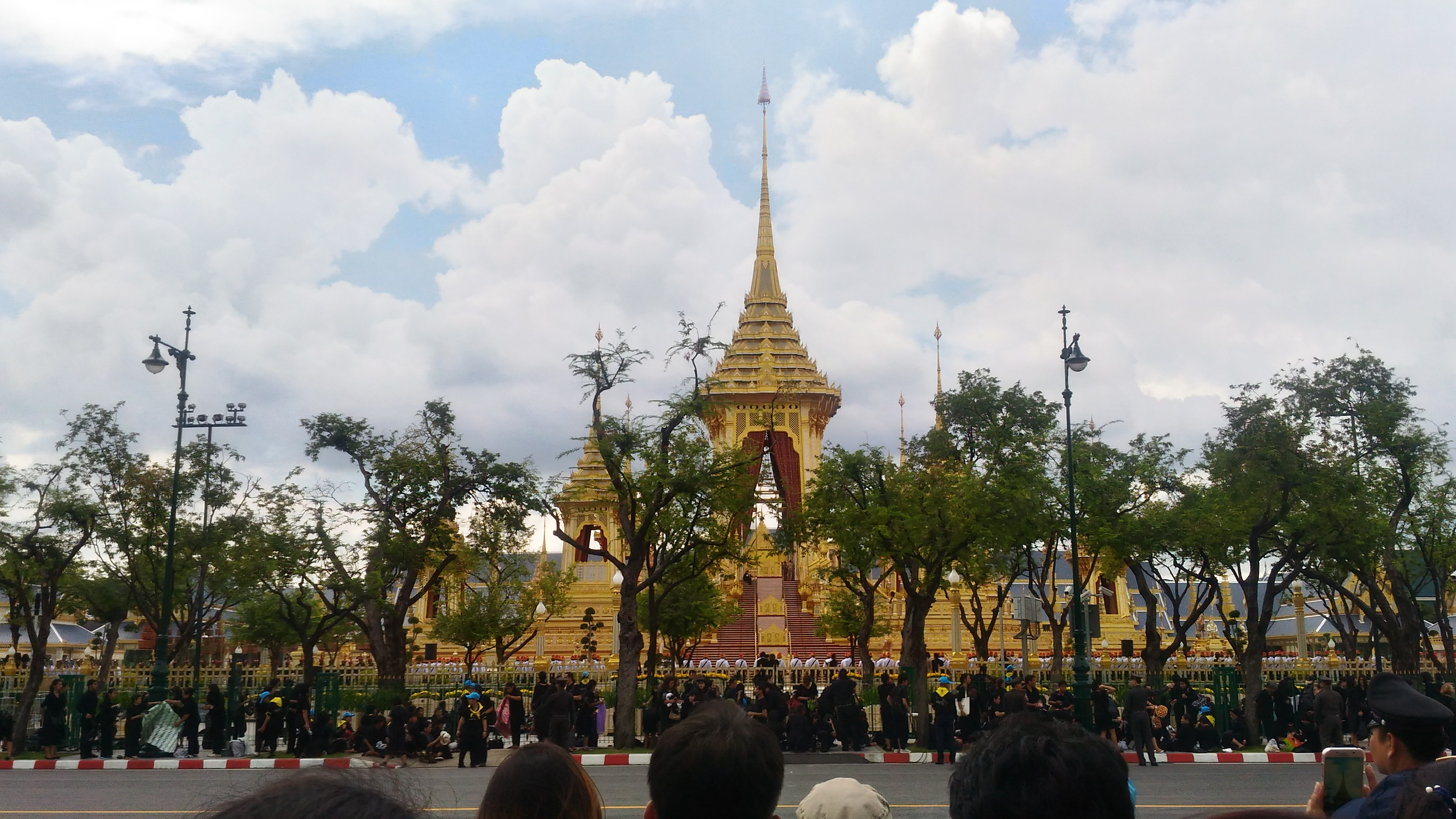
The crematorium of King Bhumibol Adulyadej, Sanam Luang

King Rama IX used Sanam Luang annually in May, for the Ploughing Ceremony and the Ceremony of Calling the Rain. There were various ceremonies performed at Sanam Luang, including the Bi-Centennial Celebration of Bangkok (Thai: พระราชพิธีฉลองกรุงรัตนโกสินทร์ครบ 200 ปี), in 1982, the grand celebration of the golden jubilee royal ceremony in 1996 (Thai: พระราชพิธีกาญจนาภิเษก) and the cremation of King Ananda Mahidol in 1950, Queen Savang Vadhana in 1956, Queen Rambhai Barni of King Rama VII in 1986, Princess Mother Srinagarindra in 1996, Princess Galyani Vadhana in 2008, and Princess Bejaratana Rajasuda in 2012.

Following the 13 October 2016 death of King Bhumibol Adulyadej, massive crowds flooded Sanam Luang to pay their respects to the late-king. His cremation took place here on 26 October 2017.

During 2020 Thai protests, the field was a place of a rally on 19–20 September 2020, and the place where the "Second Khana Ratsadon Plaque" was installed. The plaque was removed within 24 hours, and protest leaders were charged with damaging a historical site.

Sanam Luang served as the one of ceremony venues of 2025 SEA Games along with Rajamangala National Stadium.
