= Front Palace (Bangkok) =

Palace in Thailand

- พระราชวังบวรสถานมงคล
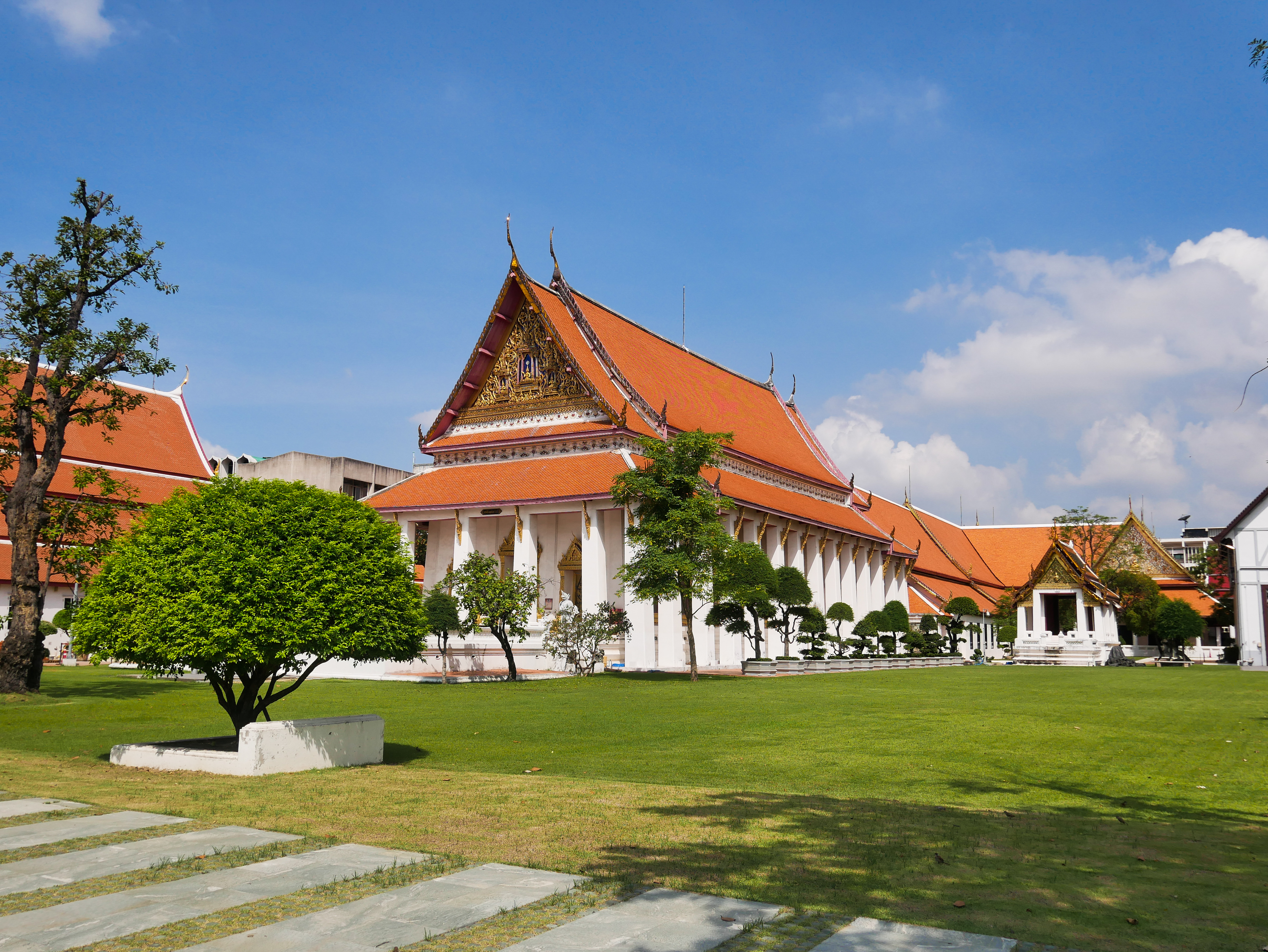
- The Phutthaisawan Hall serves as the chapel of the Phra Phuttha Sihing Buddha image

- Location within Bangkok

General information
- Status: Former royal palace; museum complex
- Location: Phra Nakhon, Bangkok, Thailand
- Coordinates: 13°45′00″N 100°29′31″E
- Construction started: 1782

The Front Palace (Thai: วังหน้า, RTGS: Wang Na), officially the Phra Ratchawang Bowon Sathan Mongkhon (พระราชวังบวรสถานมงคล), was the residence of the royal holder of the same title (also known as the uparaja and usually translated as "viceroy" or "vice king", and sometimes as "Lord" or "Prince of the Front Palace", or "Prince-successor") during the early-to-mid Rattanakosin Kingdom. The palace was built at the same time and in the similar manner as the Grand Palace, following the accession of King Rama I and the foundation of Rattanakosin (today's Bangkok) as the capital city in 1782. It was located at the northern end of the inner fortified city, directly in front of the Grand Palace, where the king lived, and provided security to the city.

Most of the Front Palace was built under Surasinghanat, who had been named by Rama I, though it saw further additions and modifications throughout the periods. It was home to five of the six Princes of the Front Palace, until the death of Wichaichan in 1885, after which the position was abolished by King Chulalongkorn in favour of a modern succession system. The palace compound was subsequently converted for various functions. Today, only the buildings of the main residence remain, housing the Bangkok National Museum. Other parts of the historical compound are now occupied by Thammasat University, the National Theatre, the Bunditpatanasilpa Institute, and the northern part of Sanam Luang. While almost all of walls and all fortifications were dismantled.

== Origin of the term "Front Palace" ==
Prince Damrong Rajanubhab proposed two explanations for the origin of the term "Front Palace" (Wang Na), the official residence of the Maha Uparat (Viceroy). First, he argued that it was called the "Front Palace" because it was located in front of the main Royal Palace. In Ayutthaya, the Maha Uparat's residence, such as Chantharakasem Palace, stood on the eastern side of the royal compound, which was regarded as the "front".

Second, he suggested that the term derived from traditional Siamese military organization. In wartime, the king commanded the main royal force (the "royal army"), while the Maha Uparat led the vanguard or "front division" (fai na). The residence of this commander was called the "front division palace" (wang fai na), which was later shortened in common usage to simply "Front Palace" (wang na).

Damrong also observed parallels in neighboring polities. In Burmese, the Viceroy was known as the "Lord of the Front Palace", and in northern tributary states such as Chiang Mai, the title of the Uparat was "Chao Ho Na" ("Lord of the Front Hall"), reflecting the same idea of a "front" residence.

Ayutthaya had, in addition to the Front Palace, a "Rear Palace" (Wang Lang), located behind the main royal palace and apparently unknown in other kingdoms. The Rear Palace was the residence of the prince titled Krom Phra Ratchawang Bowon Sathan Phimuk, and both the person and his residence were called the "Rear Palace," just like the Front Palace.

The system continued in early Rattanakosin, but the Rear Palace in Bangkok was moved to the west bank of the Chao Phraya River, opposite the Grand Palace. Prince Anurak Devesh was appointed as Rear Palace by Rama I, and he was the first and only holder of that title in the Rattanakosin period.

== History ==
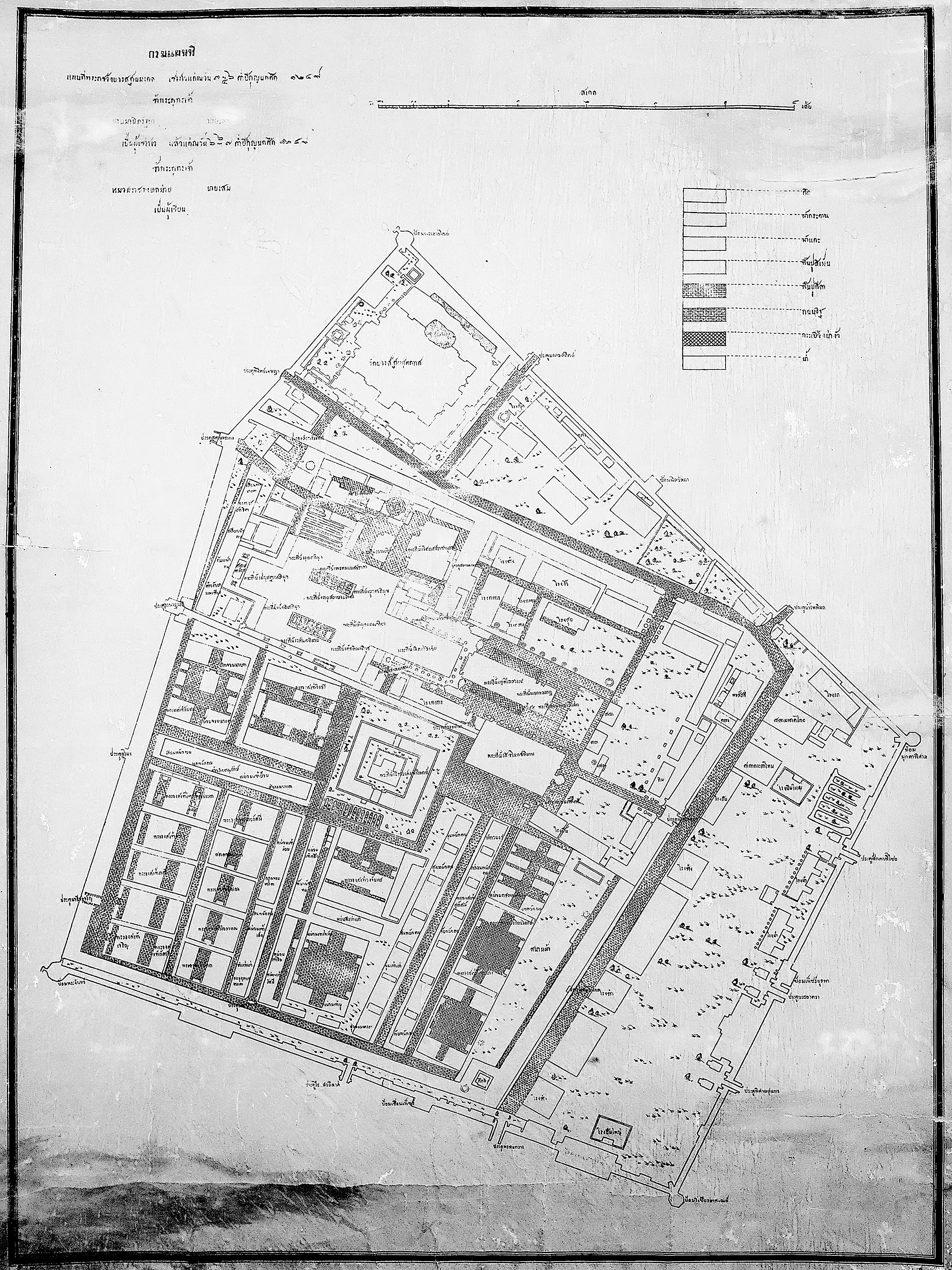
Map of the Front Palace in 1887

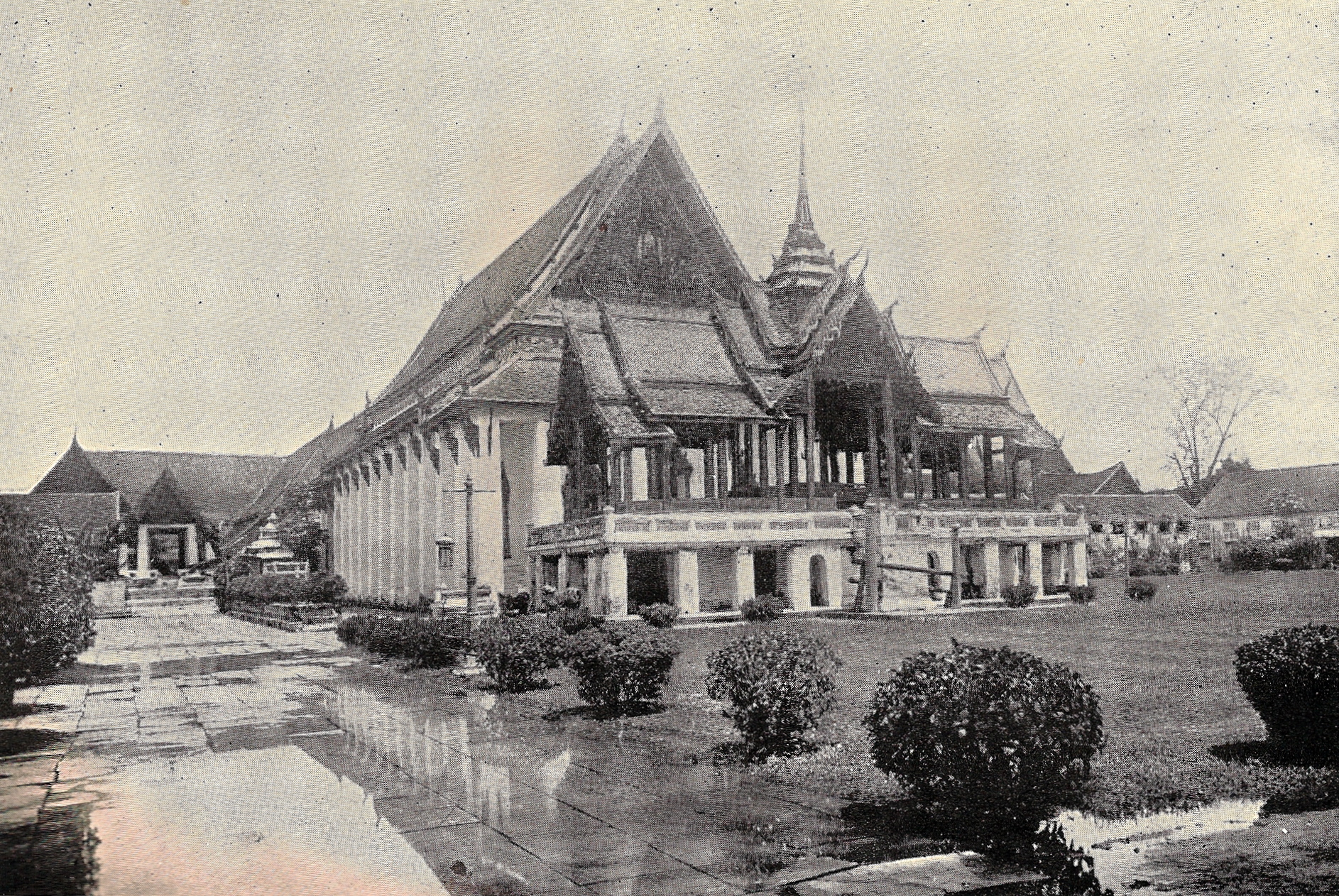
Photograph of the Front Palace, the former residence of the Second King of Siam, taken around 1890

In 1782, the general Chaophraya Chakri overthrew Taksin—who had ruled the Thonburi Kingdom following the fall of the Ayutthaya Kingdom in 1767—and declared himself king of the new Rattanakosin Kingdom, now known as King Rama I. He sought to revive the royal institutions of the Ayutthaya, many of which had been neglected during Taksin's reign. The new city of Rattanakosin was established on the eastern bank of the Chao Phraya River, enclosed by moats forming an area now known as Rattanakosin Island. The city was laid out according to Ayutthayan tradition, with the Grand Palace (the residence of the king) by the river, and the Front Palace, which served as the residence of the vice-king, some distance in front of it. The Front Palace held considerable power, with its own army, and administration of the northern half of the city fell under the palace.

The new Front Palace was built north of the Grand Palace, near the junction where the inner city moat (Khlong Khu Mueang Doem) met the river. Construction of the compound began in 1782, overseen by Rama I's younger brother and viceroy Surasinghanat, and was provisionally completed in 1785. As with the Grand Palace, the buildings were initially built of wood, as priority for masonry construction was given to the city's and palaces' fortifications.

Like the Grand Palace, the Front Palace compound was divided into three areas. The outer court to the east and front of the palace was home to administrative offices and military facilities. The middle court (to the west) contained the main residences and audience halls. The inner court, occupying the southwest part, served as the living quarters of the women of the prince's household.

=== The royal temple ===
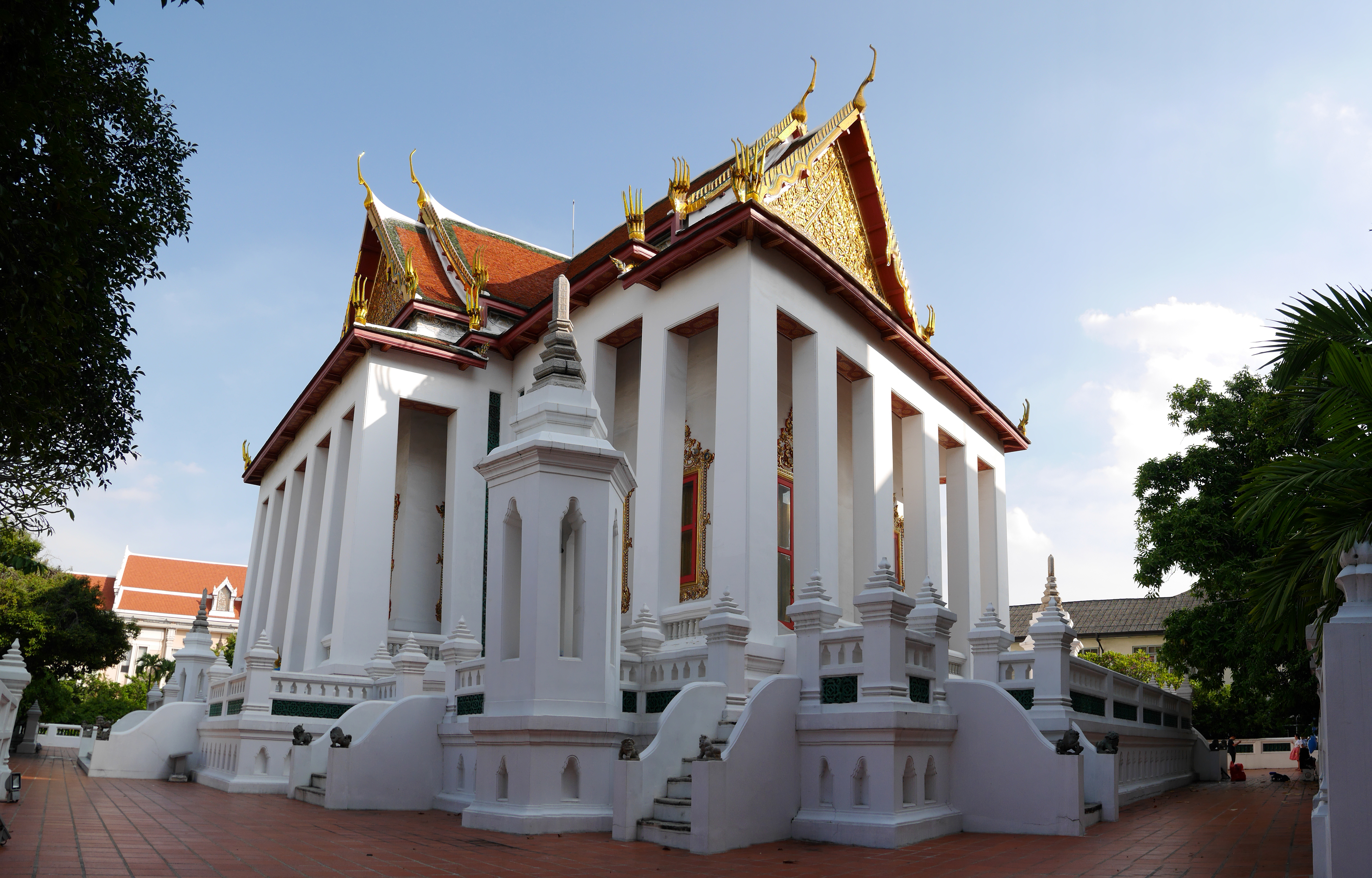
Ubosot of Wat Bowon Sathan Sutthawat

Wat Bowon Sathan Sutthawat, commonly known as "Wat Phra Kaeo Wang Na", was the royal temple or chapel of the Front Palace, situated within the palace grounds on the eastern side of the complex. Functionally it was comparable to Wat Phra Kaeo in the Grand Palace: it served as the palace's own royal temple and the religious center for the Front Palace, where royal ceremonies and other court religious observances were performed. As a royal chapel it did not house a resident monastic community and was reserved for the use of the royal household, rather than the general public. The complex was laid out in traditional Thai court style, with a principal ordination hall (ubosot) and associated structures serving ceremonial purposes.

=== Occupants and construction history ===
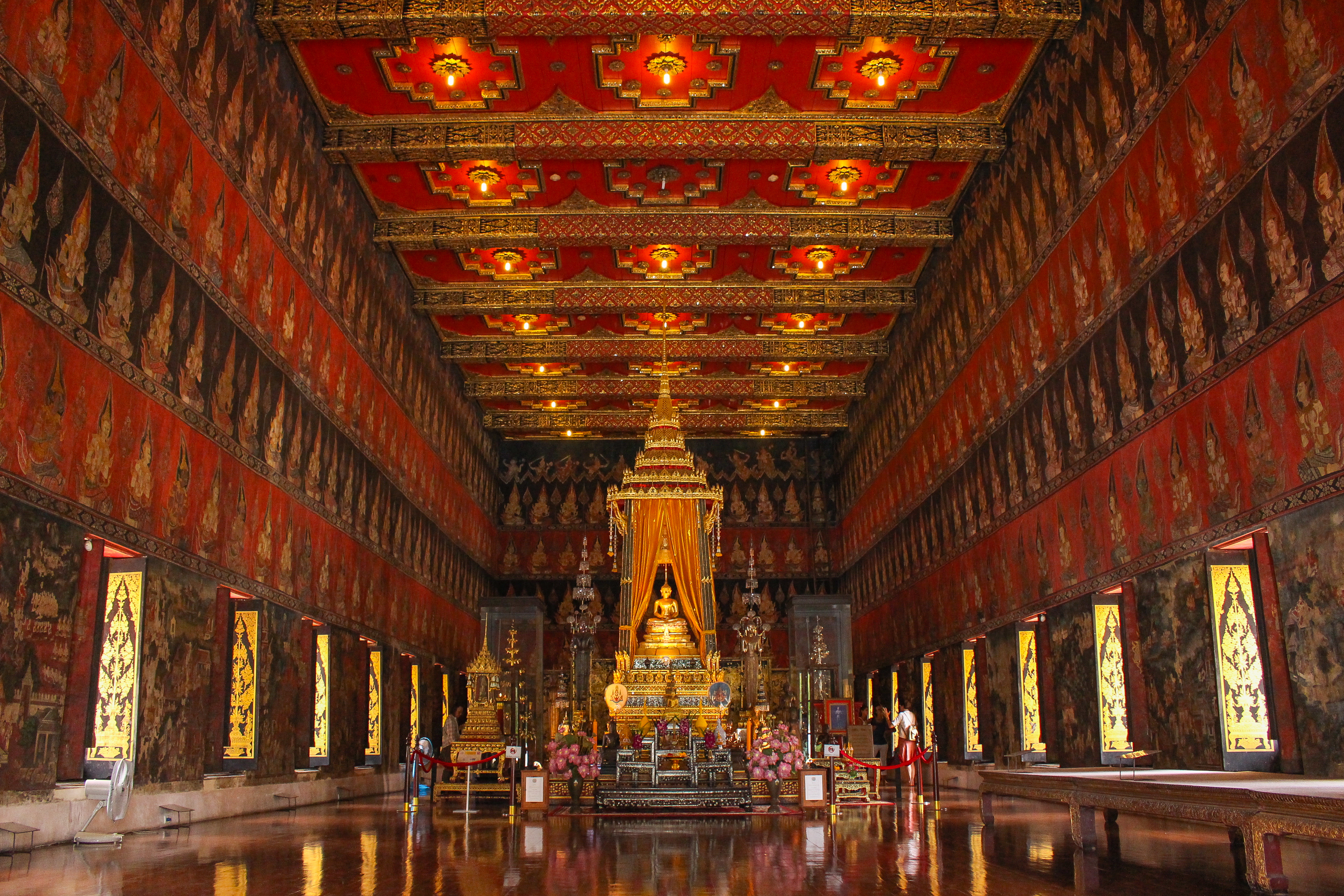
Interior of the Phutthaisawan Throne Hall in the Front Palace, showing the Phra Phuttha Sihing enshrined beneath a royal canopy, with early Rattanakosin-period court-style mural paintings on the walls.

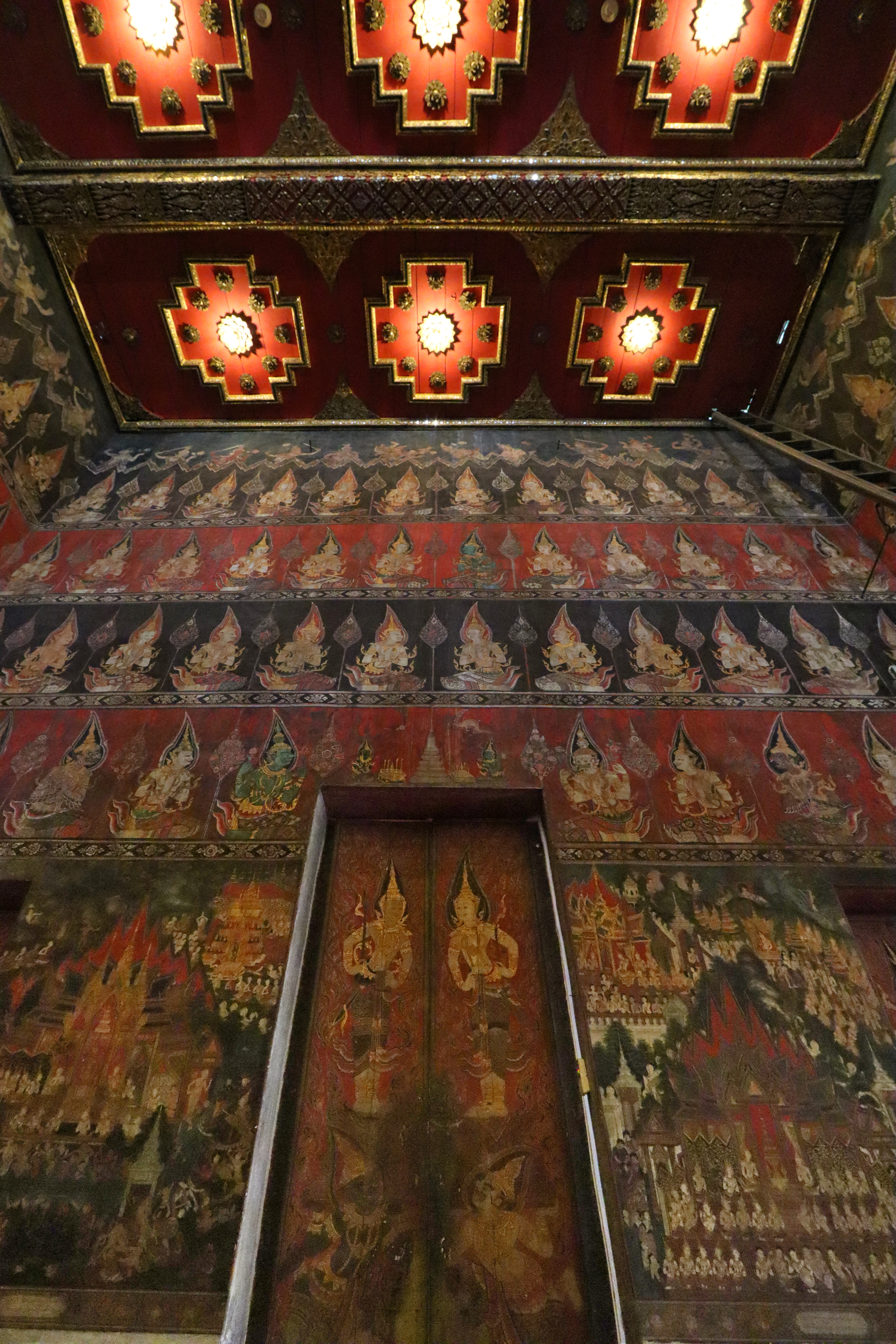
Door panels depicting guardian figures inside the Phutthaisawan Throne Hall

Most of the main royal buildings in the middle court were built during the tenure of Surasinghanat. The Siwamokkhaphiman Hall, originally built of wood as an open-air pavilion, served as the first throne room. It was followed by the main residence building, a group of eleven connected halls known as the Phra Wiman, built around 1789. The Phutthaisawan Hall was probably built around 1795, when Surasinghanat led a campaign defending Chiang Mai against Burma and brought from the former the Phra Phuttha Sihing Buddha image, which was then enshrined in the hall.

Surasinghanat ruled the palace until his death in 1803. It is said that prior to his death, he had his retinue take him on a tour of the palace, and, lamenting that he would not live to enjoy the architecture, cursed anyone but his descendants to be unable to live there in peace. Word of the curse appeared to have been taken seriously, as when Rama I named his son Prince Itsarasunthon (later King Rama II) the new viceroy in 1806, he did not have him take up residence at the Front Palace. Instead, the Prince continued to reside at the Thonburi Palace, leaving the Front Palace without an occupant for seven years. Rama I had the Phra Phuttha Sihing moved to the Grand Palace during this time.

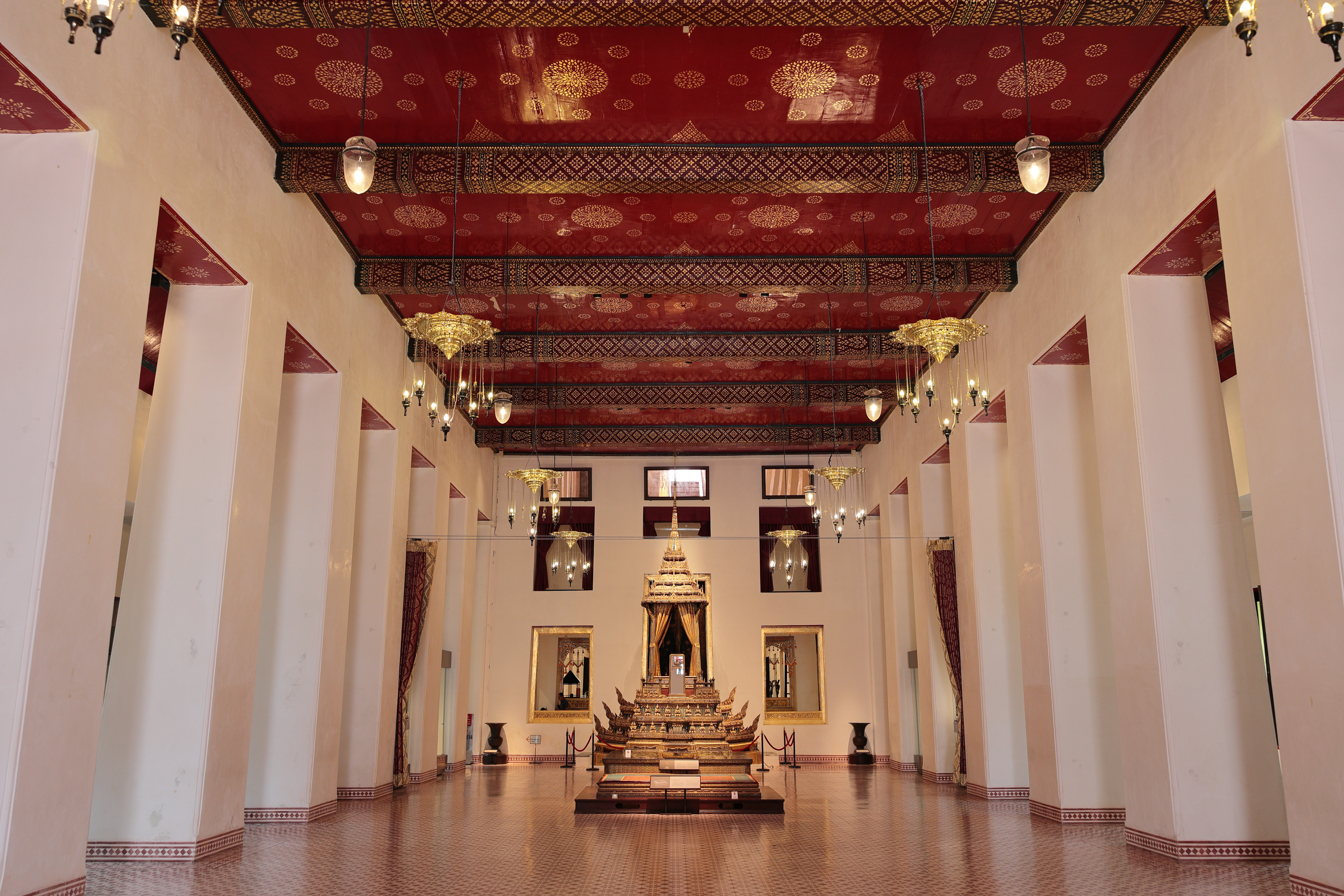
Audience chamber of the Issara Winitchai Throne Hall.

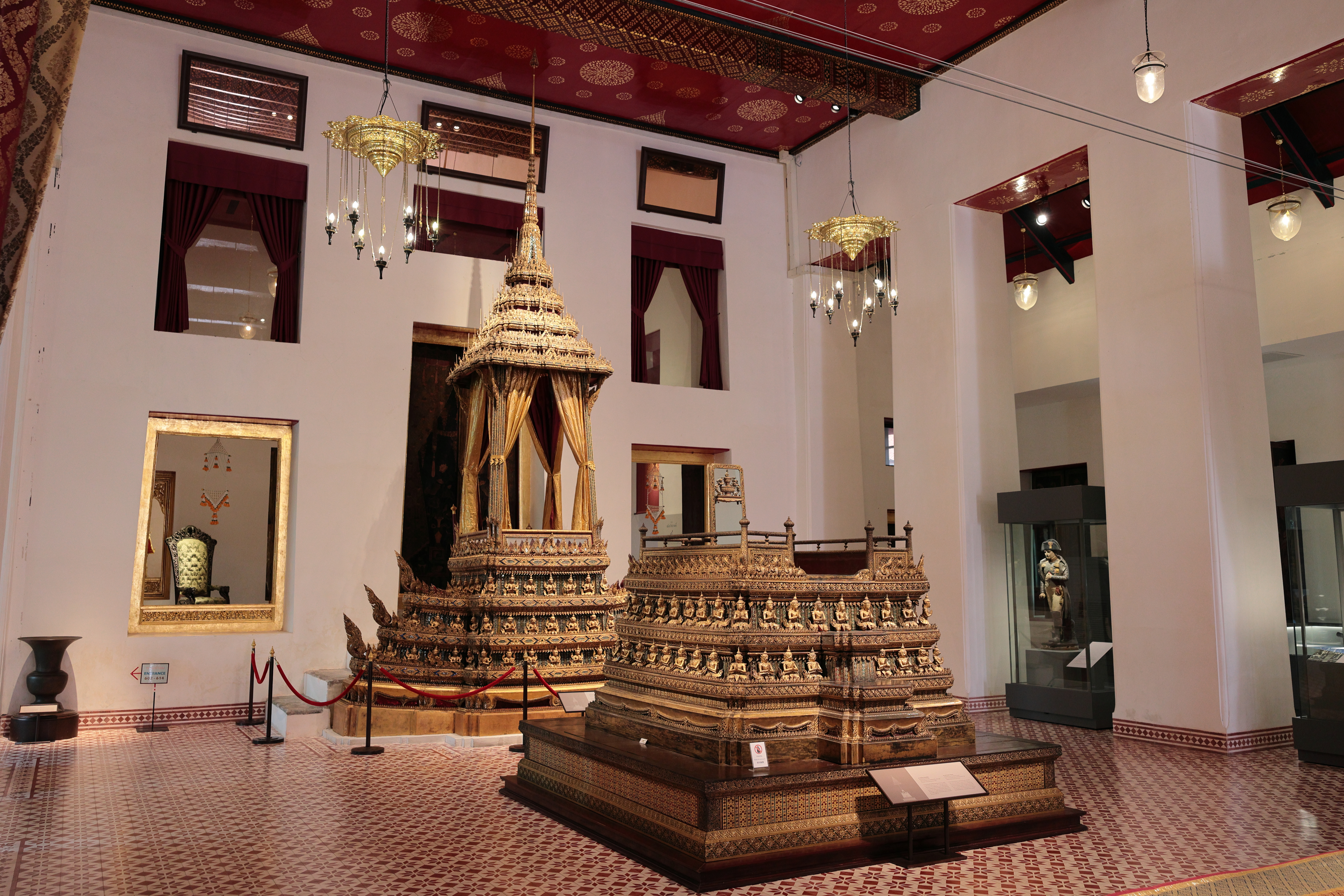
The Busabok and the royal throne in the audience chamber of the Issara Winitchai Throne Hall.

Later occupants of the palace also actively attempted to avoid the curse. When Rama II became king in 1809, the new viceroy, Senanurak, married one of Surasinghanat's daughters in the belief that by becoming a son-in-law, he would be spared from the curse. (He held the position until his death in 1817, after which the palace went unoccupied for another seven years.) Likewise, Sakdiphonlasep, the next viceroy named by King Rama III in 1824, married another daughter of Surasinghanat. Sakdiphonlasep also commissioned major repairs of the palace. He had the Siwamokkhaphiman Hall rebuilt in masonry and added a new extension, known as the Issara Winitchai Hall, in front of the Phra Wiman group to serve as the new throne room. He also rebuilt the royal temple and gave it the name Bowon Sathan Sutthawat. Like his predecessor, Sakdiphonlasep predeceased the king after eight years, and Rama III never named another viceroy in the remaining nineteen years of his reign.

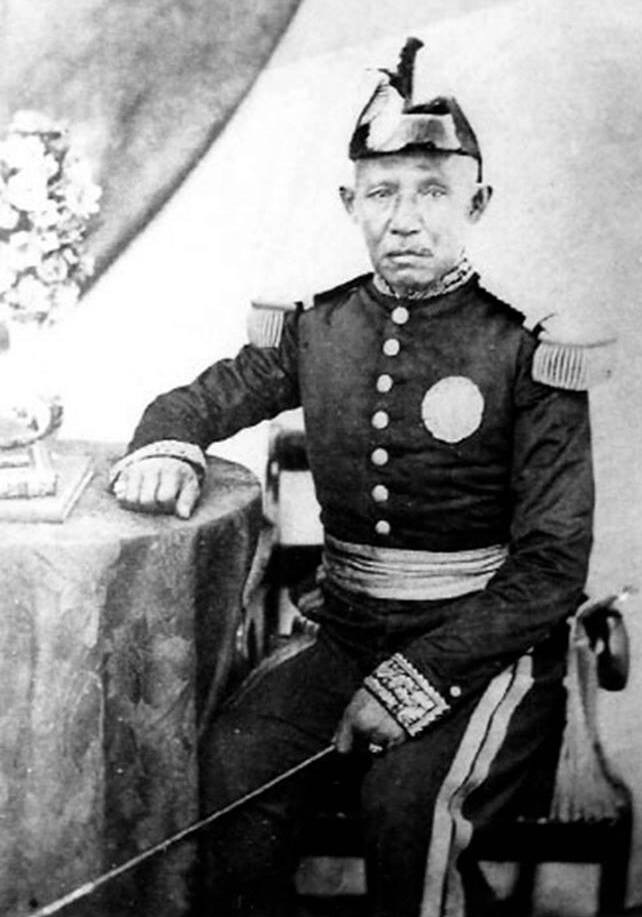
Second King Pinklao often received foreign dignitaries in his Western-style residence, the Itsaret Rachanuson Hall.

When King Mongkut (Rama IV) acceded to the throne in 1851, he named his brother Pinklao the "Second King", equivalent in rank to himself. By this time, the Front Palace had again badly fallen into disrepair. The fortifications were in ruins, and its lawns had been turned into orchards and gardens. Religious rituals were performed prior to Pinklao's taking up residence at the palace, with the Phra Phuttha Sihing moved back to the Front Palace and enchantment pillars buried at the gates and turrets. During Pinklao's time, several new buildings and pavilions were built, including the Western-style Itsaret Rachanuson Hall, which Pinklao used as his main residence.

Pinklao died in 1865, though Mongkut continued to visit the palace, ensuring its upkeep. He died three years later and was succeeded by his fifteen-year-old son Chulalongkorn (Rama V). The regent, Chaophraya Sri Suriwongse, controversially named Pinklao's son Prince Yotyingyot as the viceroy Wichaichan. The relationship between the two palaces was strained throughout the early reign, culminating in the Front Palace Crisis in 1874, which was only resolved with British support of Chulalongkorn. The Front Palace was subsequently stripped of its power and influence, and following Wichaichan's death in 1885, Chulalongkorn abolished the title, replacing it with the Crown Prince.

=== Conversion ===
With the palace now vacant, Chulalongkorn had the Royal Museum (the country's first public museum, previously established at the Concordia Hall in the Grand Palace) moved into the Siwamokkhaphiman, Phutthaisawan and Issara Winitchai halls in 1887. The outer court was razed, in part to create the newly landscaped royal field of Sanam Luang in 1897. The Ministry of Public Instruction was built in its northern area in 1905. The inner court originally remained as the residences of the remaining wives and daughters of the Front Palace. As it became depopulated, the area was later dedicated for military use, and barracks were built.

In 1926, King Prajadhipok (Rama VII) dedicated the rest of the remaining palace structures to the museum. Following the abolition of absolute monarchy in 1932, its administration fell under the Fine Arts Department. The College of Dramatic Arts (now part of the Bunditpatanasilpa Institute) was established at the Itsaret Rachanuson Hall in 1934, before moving to the area of Wat Bowon Sathan Sutthawat. Most of the area of the former inner court, then used by the military, was acquired for the establishment of the University of Moral and Political Sciences (now Thammasat University) in 1935. The National Theatre was built at the former site of the Ministry of Public Instruction (by then occupied by the Ministry of Transport) in 1960.

Today, the remaining buildings of the palace, along with a few newer structures, house the Bangkok National Museum. Part of the palace's southern wall remains as the boundary of Thammasat University, and foundations of the river-facing city walls (which were shared by the palace) are visible beneath the 60th Anniversary Thammasat Building.

== Architecture ==
The architecture of the Front Palace consists of an eclectic mix of styles reflecting the changing times over which the buildings were built, as well its owners' tastes. They range from the traditional Thai style of the original buildings to the Chinese- and Western–influenced structures built nearly a century later as the country was opening up to the Western world and beginning its modernization. The traditional architecture of the Front Palace bears distinct differences in style from that of the Grand Palace, reflecting the subordinate status of its owner. Most notably, none of the original buildings were built with the multi-tiered roofs with pointed spires known as prasat, a common element in the buildings of the Grand Palace. This changed during Pinklao's time, since he shared equal stature as the king, and the Khotchakamprawet Pavilion was accordingly built with a spire.

=== Gallery ===
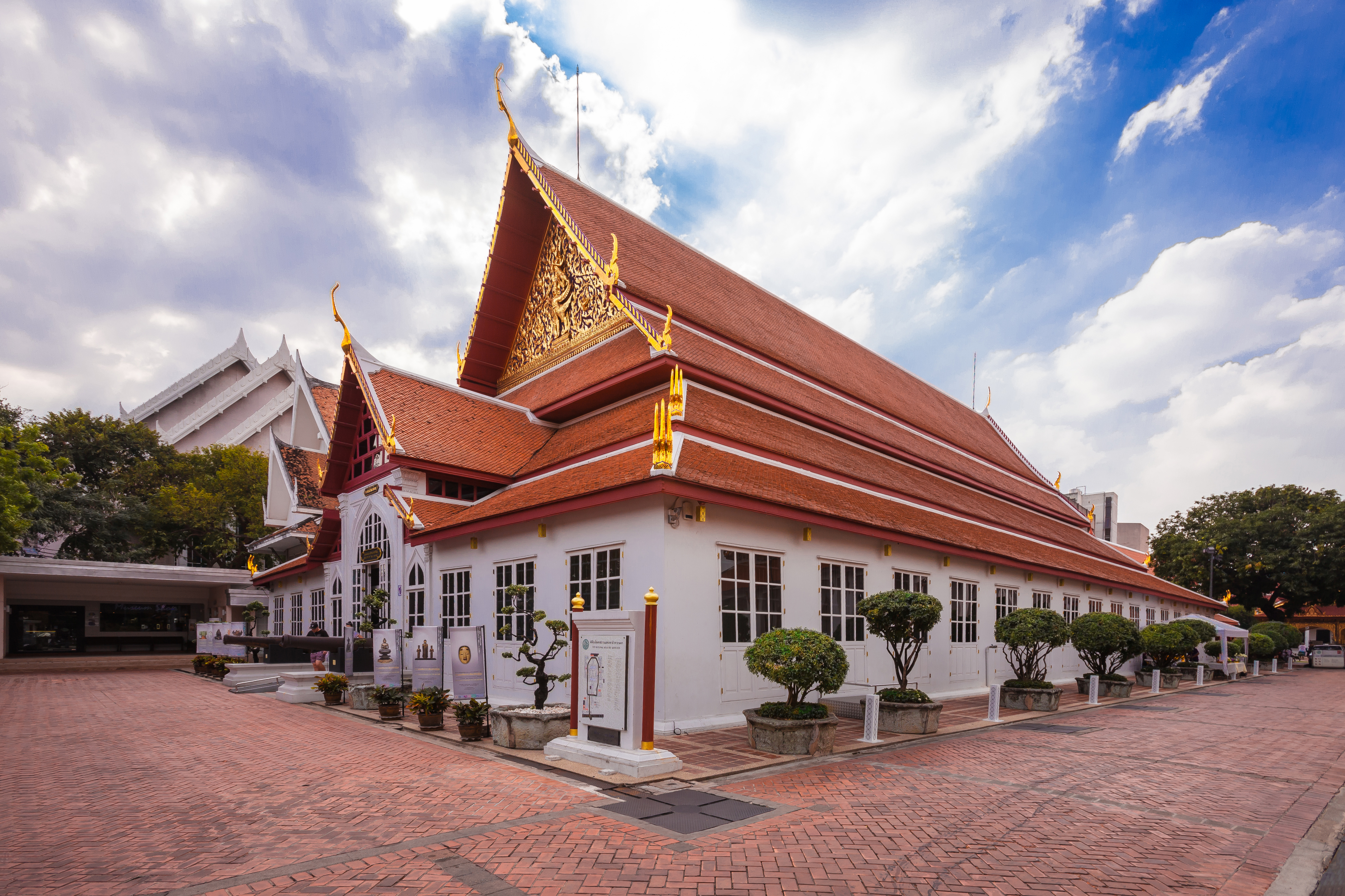
Siwamokkhaphiman Hall

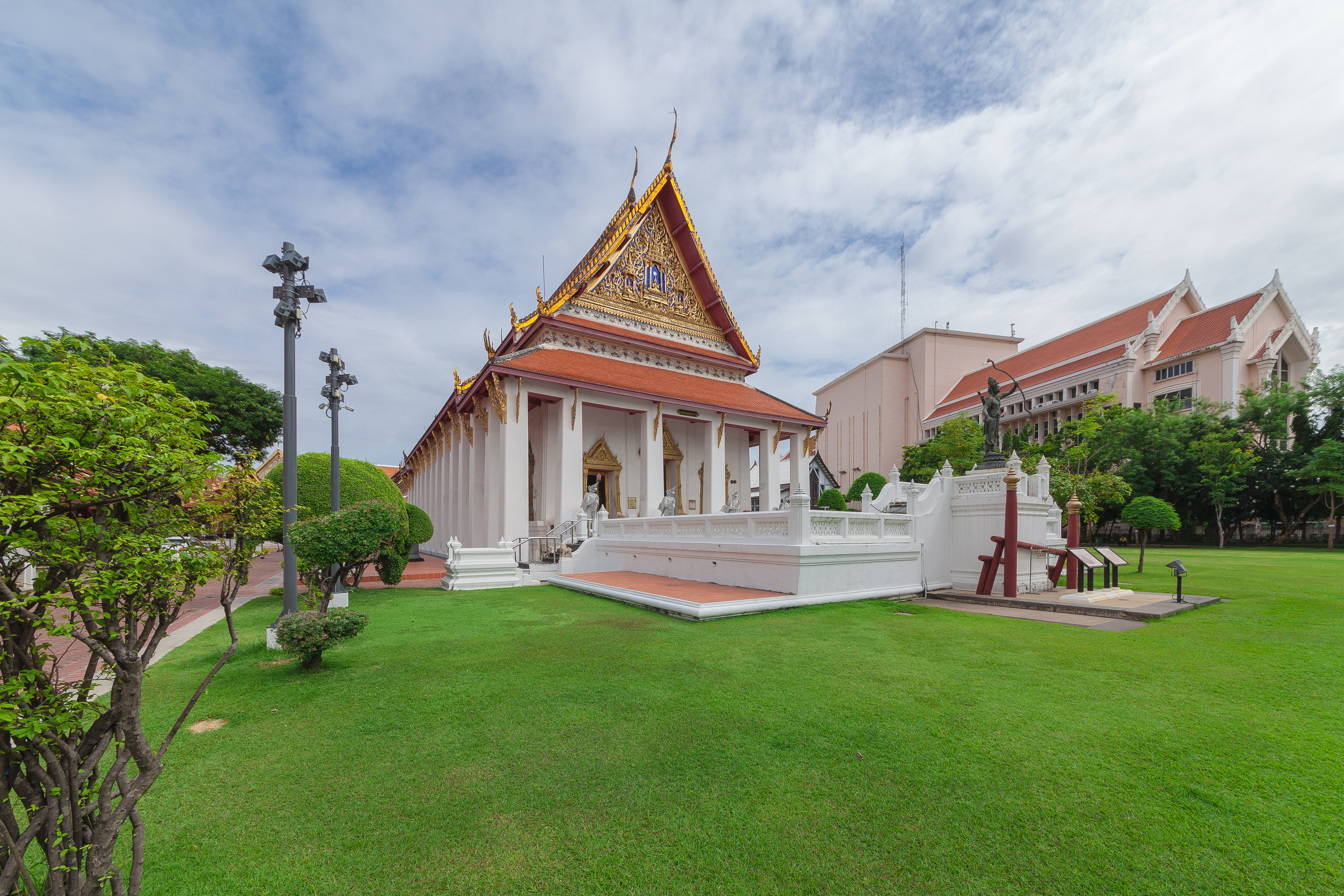
Phutthaisawan Hall

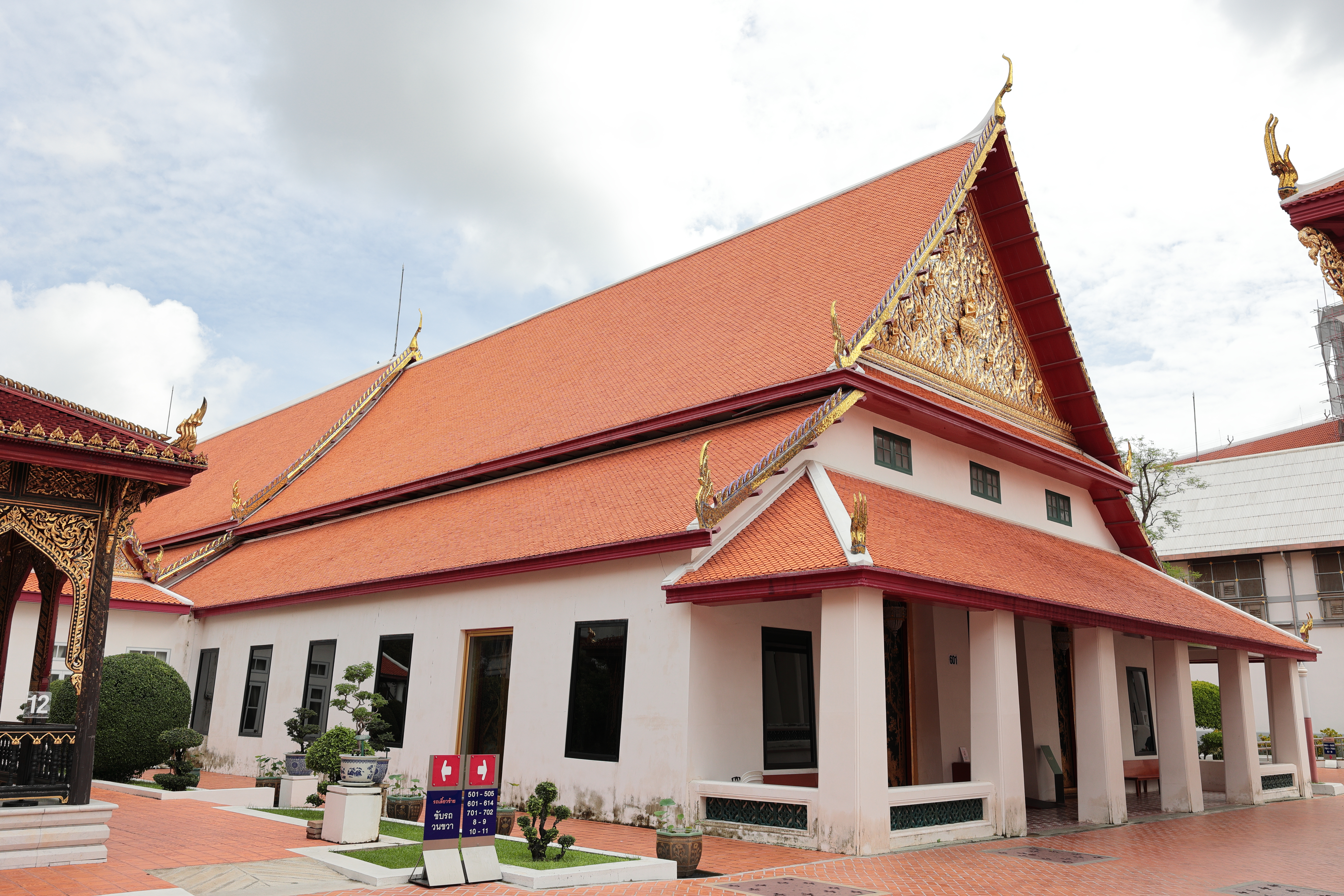
Issara Winitchai Hall

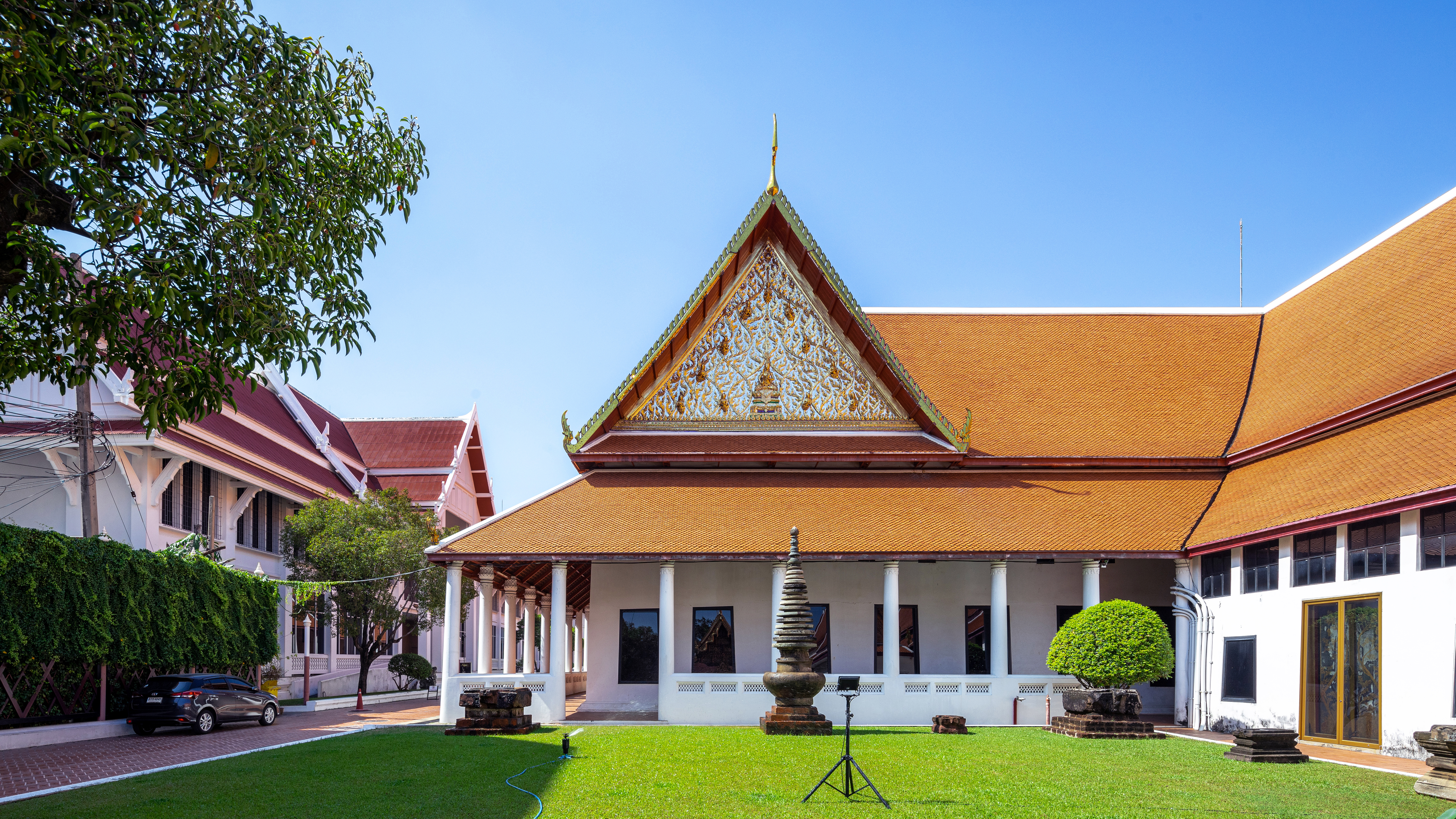
Phra Thinang Taksina Bhimook

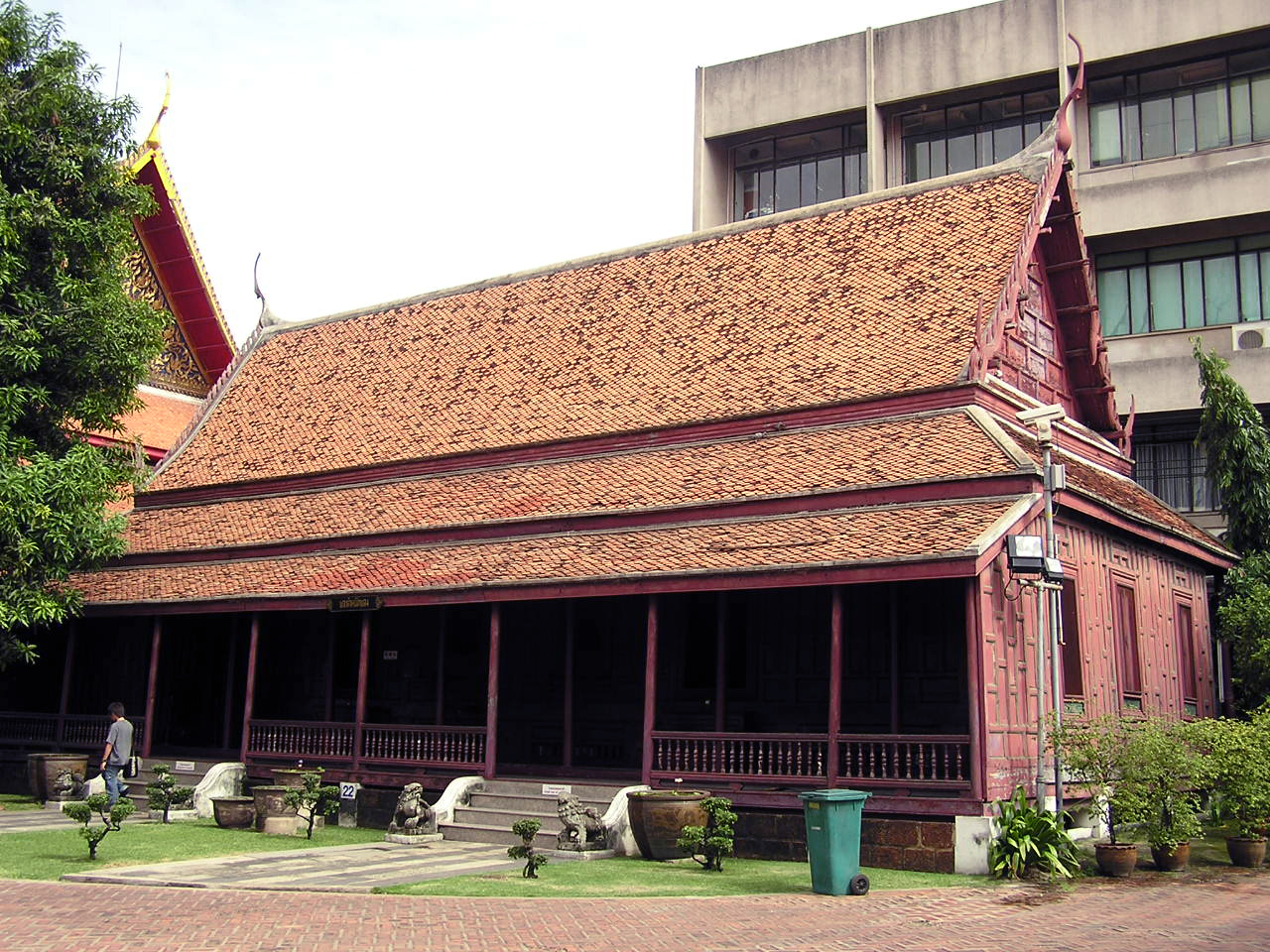
Phra Tamnak Daeng (Red House)

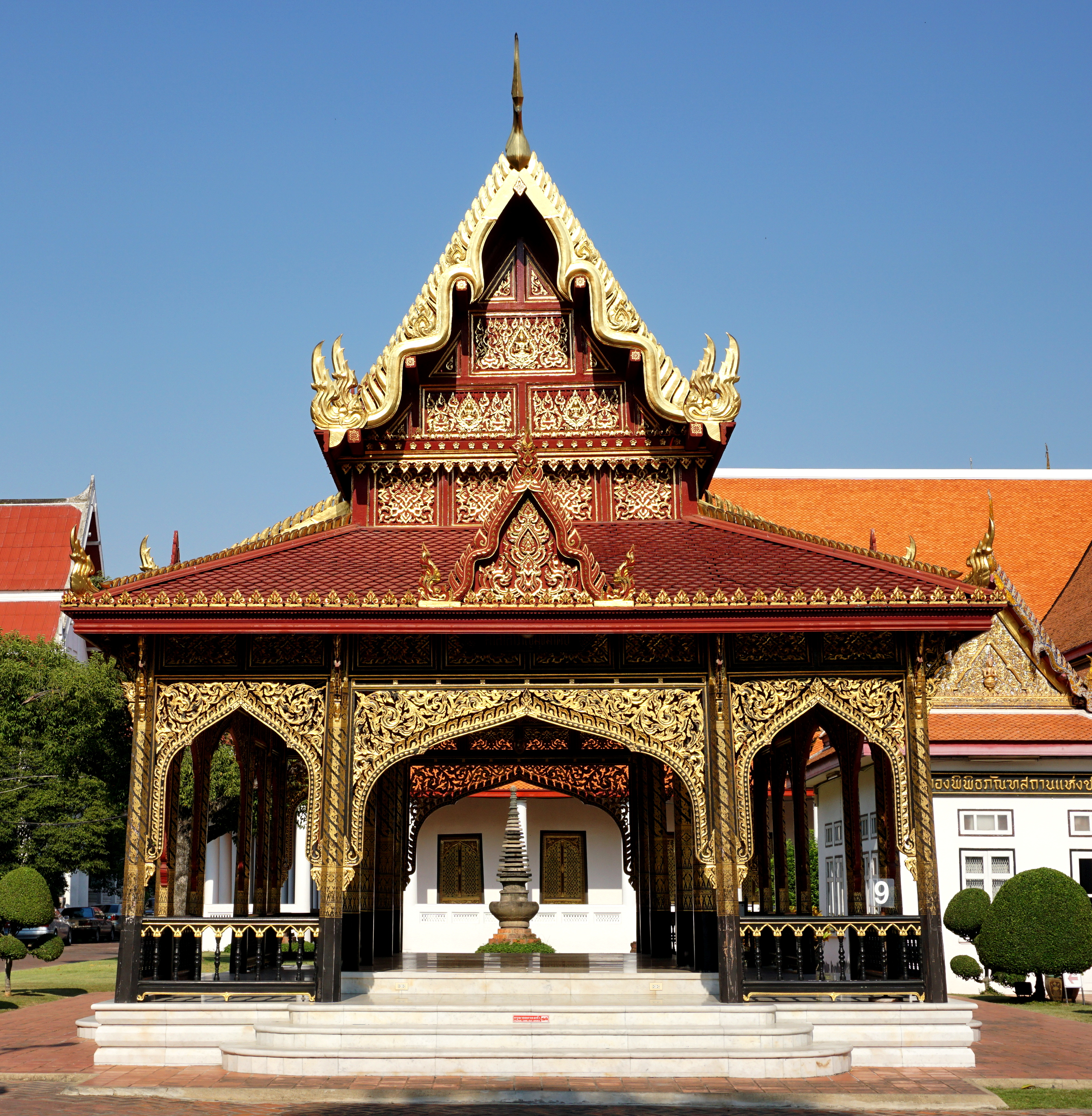
Samran Mukkhamat Pavilion

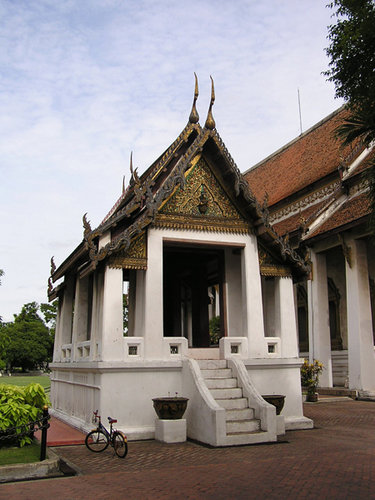
Mangkhalaphisek Pavilion

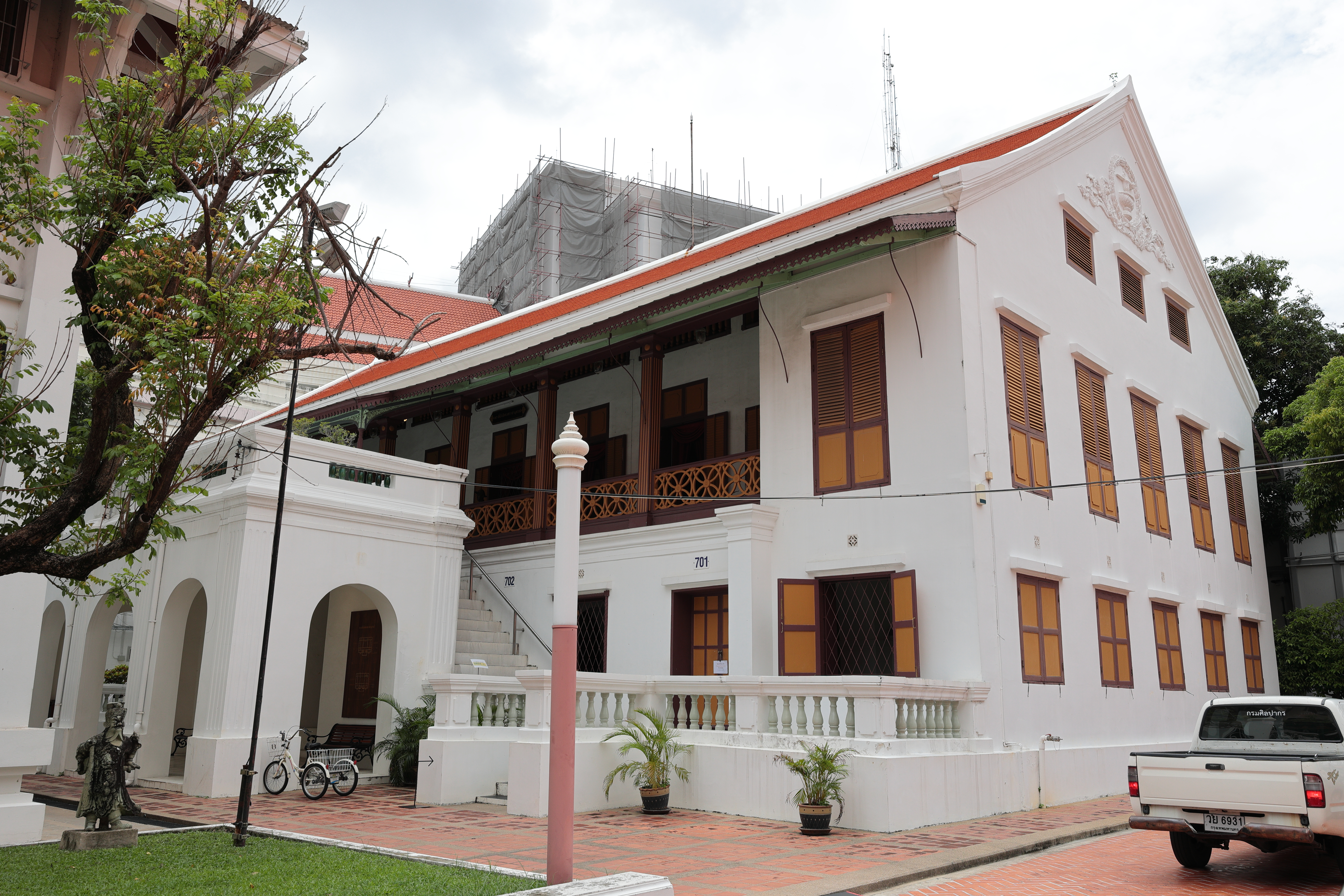
Itsaret Rachanuson Hall
