= Sultanate of Singora =

Fortified port city in southern Thailand

Coordinates: 7.2235°N 100.5680°E

- 1605–1680
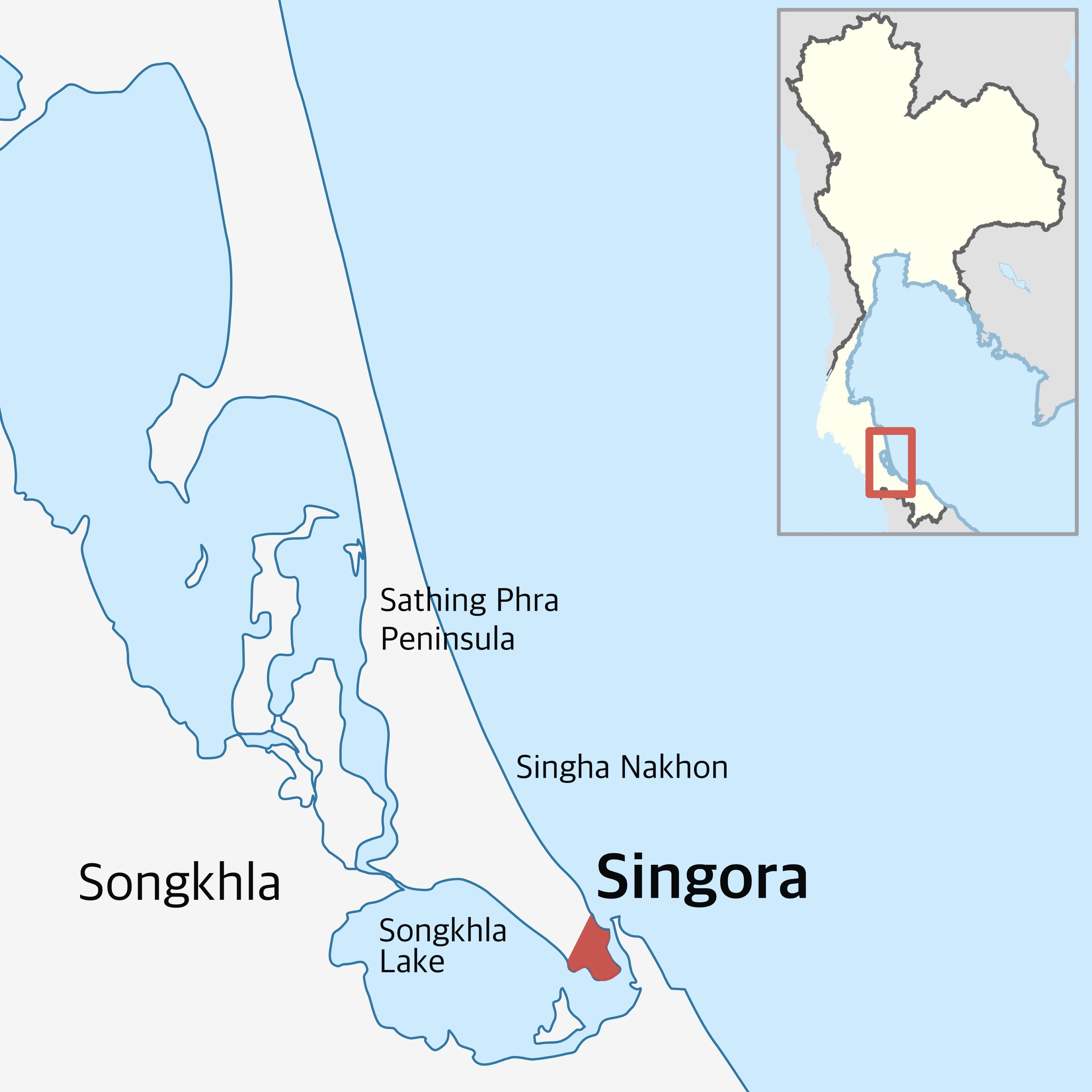
- The Sultanate of Singora was a heavily fortified port city in the deep south of Thailand.
- Capital: Singora
- Government: Sultanate
- Historical era: Early 17th century and Ayutthaya Kingdom
  - Established: 1605
  - Declared independence: 1642
  - Disestablished: 1680
Preceded by	Succeeded by
Ayutthaya kingdom	Ayutthaya kingdom
- Today part of: Thailand

The Sultanate of Singora was a heavily fortified port city in southern Thailand and the precursor of the present-day town of Songkhla. It was founded in the early 17th century by a Persian Muslim, Dato Mogol, and flourished during the reign of his son, Sultan Sulaiman Shah. In 1680, after decades of conflict, the city was destroyed and abandoned; remains include forts, city walls, a Dutch cemetery and the tomb of Sultan Sulaiman Shah. An inscribed cannon from Singora bearing the seal of Sultan Sulaiman Shah is displayed next to the flagpole at the Royal Hospital Chelsea, London.

The sultanate's history was documented in accounts, letters and journals written by British and Dutch East India Company traders; its destruction was discussed in books and reports authored by representatives of the French embassies to Siam in the mid 1680s. Sultan Sulaiman's family history has also been chronicled: Princess Sri Sulalai, a consort of King Rama II and mother of King Rama III, was descended from Sultan Sulaiman; present-day descendants include the 22nd Prime Minister of Thailand and a former Navy admiral. Sources pertaining to the Singora cannon include articles published in academic journals and letters written by General Sir Harry Prendergast, commander of the Burma Expeditionary Force that captured Mandalay in the third Anglo-Burmese War.

== History ==
=== Early history ===
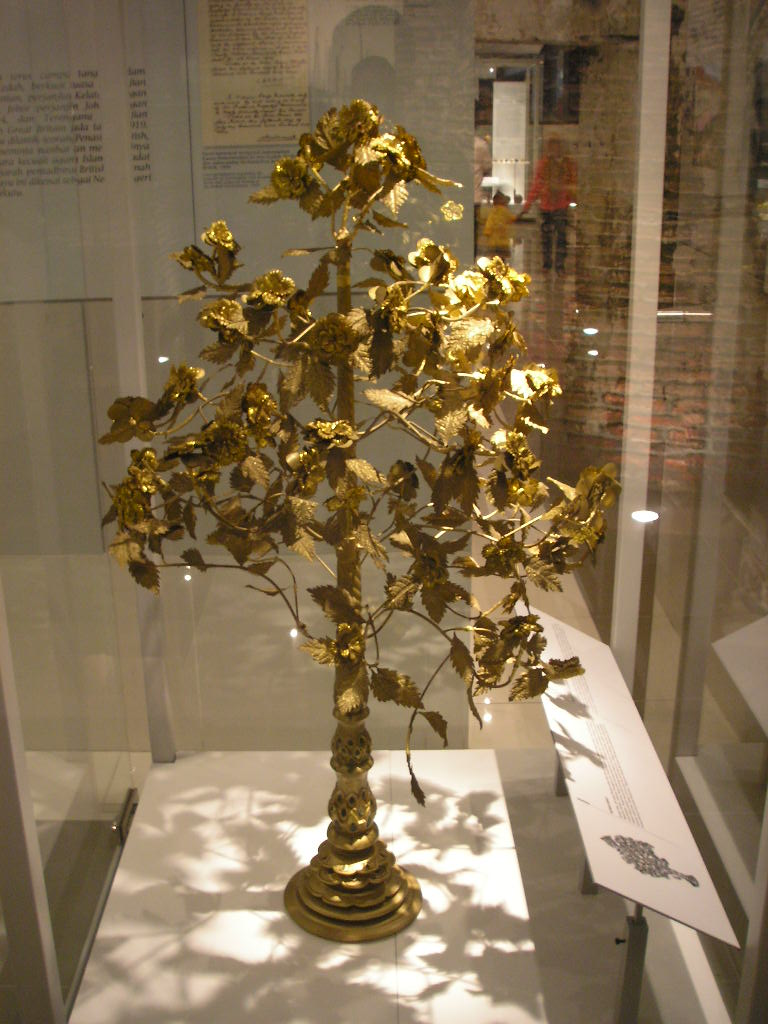
Siamese vassal states in the deep south showed allegiance to Ayuthaya by sending tribute. Along with slaves and weapons, tribute consisted of the Bunga Mas, a small tree decorated with gold.

The Sultanate of Singora, sometimes known as Songkhla at Khao Daeng, was a port city in the deep south of Thailand and precursor of the present-day town of Songkhla. It was located near the southern tip of the Sathing Phra peninsula, on and around the foothills of Khao Daeng Mountain in Singha Nakhon. British and Dutch East India Company traders called the city Sangora; Japanese officials knew it as Shinichu; contemporary French writers used the names Singor, Cingor and Soncourat.

Singora was founded in the early 17th century by Dato Mogol, a Muslim who accepted Siamese suzerainty and paid tribute to the Kingdom of Ayutthaya. (Note: Dato Mogal migrated to the south of Thailand from Java in the early 1600s. His departure from Indonesia coincided with Holland's forays into the region in the late 1590s and subsequent control of the spice trade. Tomé Pires discussed Persian merchants resident in Java in his Suma Oriental que trata do Mar Roxo até aos Chins, an account of the Orient written shortly after the Portuguese conquest of Malacca in 1511. Pires wrote that Persians "killed the Javanese lords and made themselves lords; and in this way they made themselves masters of the sea coast and took over trade and power in Java". Dato Mogol and his family were far from the only Persians to attain positions of authority in 17th-century Siam. The Royal Chronicles of Ayuthaya, for example, mention Persian brothers Sheikh Ahmad and Muhammad Said who also arrived in Siam in the early 1600s. Sheikh Ahmad worked closely with Kings Songtham and Prasat Thong, and was eventually appointed Phra Khlang. His descendants, the Bunnag family, remained politically influential for the next three hundred years. In the Ship of Sulaiman, an account of an embassy sent to Siam in 1685 on behalf of the Shah of Persia, the author described how Persians in Ayuthaya orchestrated King Narai's accession to the throne and for many years controlled all important affairs of state.) The traditional narrative holds that Dato Mogol was a Persian or Indo-Persian adventurer, though by another interpretation he may have instead been a Malay governor authorized by the king of Ligor. The port was said to be ideal and able to accommodate more than 80 large vessels; a network of overland and riverine routes expedited trans-peninsular trade with the Sultanate of Kedah. Jeremias van Vliet, Director of the Dutch East India Company's trading post in Ayuthaya, described Singora as one of Siam's principal cities and a major exporter of pepper; French traveller and gem merchant John Baptista Tavernier wrote about the city's abundant tin mines. A Cottonian manuscript at the British Library discusses Singora's duty-free policy and viability as a hub for regional trade:

itt were not amiss to build a strong howse in Sangora which lyeth 24 Leagues northwarde of Patania, under the gouerment of Datoe Mogoll, vassall to the King of Siam: In this place maie well the Rendezvouz bee made to bring all thinges together that you shall gather for the provideing of the ffactories of Siam, Cochinchina, Borneo and partlie our ffactorie in Japan, as you shall gather according to the advises thereof, And hither to bring all such wares as wee shall gather from the foresaid places to bee sent to Bantam and Jaccatra: this howse willbee found to bee verie Necessarie, for the charges willbee too highe in Patania besides inconveniences there; which charges you shall spare at Sangora: there you pay no Custome, onlie a small gift to Datoe Mogoll cann effect all here.

— British East India Company, A Letter of Instructions from the East Indian Company to its Agent in East India, 1614.

Dato Mogol died in 1620 and was succeeded by his eldest son, Sulaiman. (Note: The sign in front of Sulaiman's tomb gives the date of his accession as 1619; a steel plaque near the archaeological information centre states "This site is known as an important port city during the Ayuthaya period in the 17th century AD. It played a crucial role in both local and inter-regional commerce at the time. Datoh Mogal, an appointed governor of Singora, was the person who initiated and developed maritime trade with international merchants. By introducing and developing the city as an international port, Datoh Mogal could generate a great amount of revenue from foreign ships for the centralized capital of Ayuthaya. Datoh Mogal was succeeded by his son, Sultan Sulaiman, in 1620. Sultan Sulaiman was appointed by King Songtham (1610–1628) of the Kingdom of Ayuthaya. Singora under Sulaiman's administration was a famous rendezvous for trading.") A period of turmoil erupted ten years later when the Queen of Pattani branded the new ruler of Siam, King Prasat Thong, a usurper and tyrant. The queen withheld tribute and ordered attacks on Ligor (present-day Nakhon Si Thammarat) and Bordelongh (present-day Phatthalung); Ayuthaya responded by blockading Pattani with an army of 60,000 men, as well as enlisting the help of the Dutch people in capturing the City. Singora became involved in the dispute and in 1633 sent an envoy to Ayuthaya requesting help. The outcome of this request is not known, but Dutch records show that Singora was severely damaged and the pepper crop destroyed.

=== Independence ===
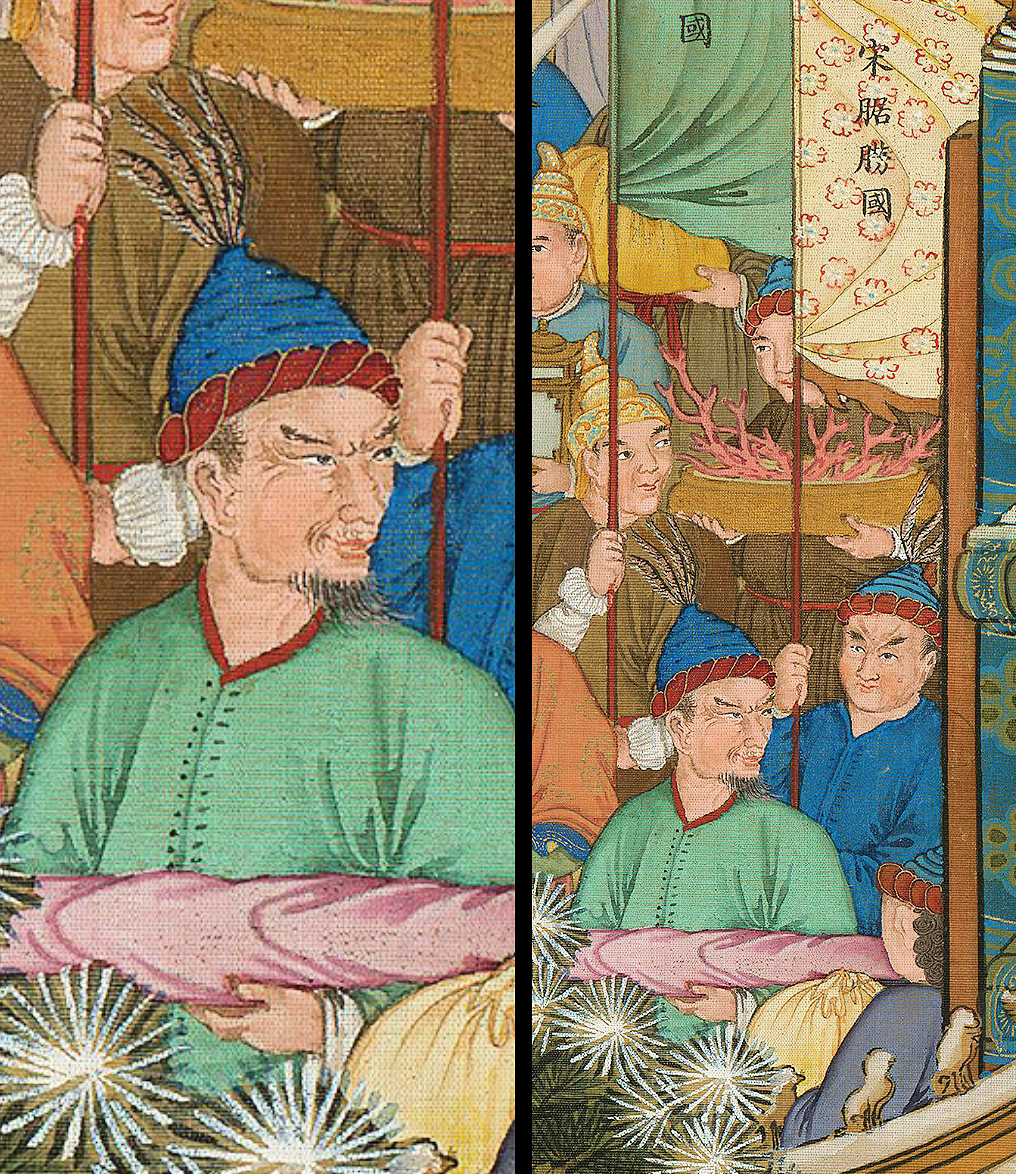
Sultanate of Singora (宋腒𦛨国) delegates in Beijing, China, in 1761. 万国来朝图

In December 1641 Jeremias van Vliet left Ayuthaya and sailed to Batavia. He stopped en route at Singora in February 1642 and presented Sulaiman with a letter of introduction from the Phra Khlang (known by the Dutch as the Berckelangh), the Siamese official responsible for foreign affairs. Sulaiman's response sheds light on his attitude towards suzerainty:

On the 3rd of February the delegate van Vlieth landed at Sangora and was received by the governor, who was angry at the Berckelangh's letter, saying that his country was open to the Netherlanders without Siamese introduction and that the letter had not been necessary. This and other haughty acts displeased the Hon. van Vlieth.

— Dutch Papers: Extracts from the "Dagh Register" 1624–1642.

Later that year Sulaiman declared independence from Ayuthaya and appointed himself Sultan Sulaiman Shah. He modernised the port, ordered the construction of city walls and moats, and built a network of forts that spanned the harbour to the summit of Khao Daeng. Trade flourished: the city was frequented by Dutch and Portuguese merchants and enjoyed amicable relations with Chinese traders. Ayuthaya tried at least three times to reclaim Singora during Sulaiman's reign; each attack failed. One naval campaign ended in ignominy when the Siamese admiral abandoned his post. To help fend off overland assaults, Sulaiman assigned his brother, Pharisees, to strengthen the nearby town of Chai Buri in Phatthalung.

Sultan Sulaiman died in 1668 and was succeeded by his eldest son, Mustapha. A war with Pattani broke out soon after, but despite being outnumbered more than four to one, Singora rejected attempts at mediation by the Sultan of Kedah and trusted in its army of experienced soldiers and cannoneers. During the late 1670s Greek adventurer Constance Phaulkon arrived in Siam. He sailed to the country from Java on a British East India Company vessel and, heeding orders from his employer, promptly embarked on a mission to smuggle arms to Singora. His escapade ended in failure when he was shipwrecked.

=== Destruction ===
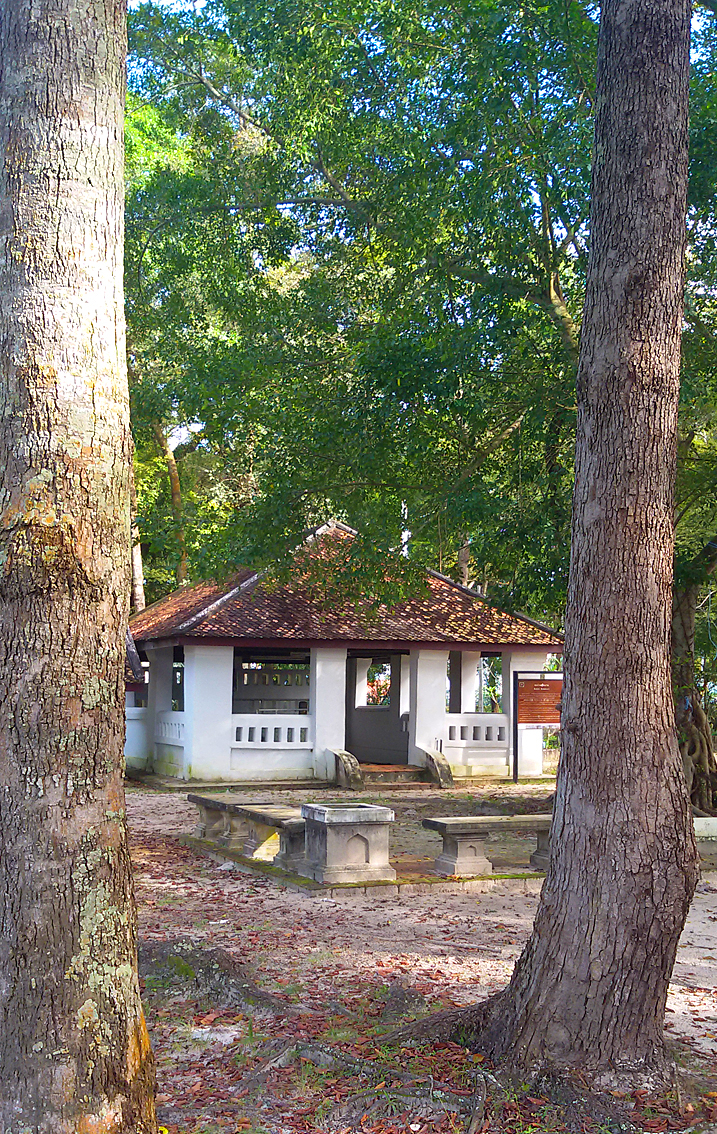
Remains of the Sultanate of Singora include forts on and around Khao Daeng Mountain, a stretch of city walls, a Dutch cemetery and the tomb of Sultan Sulaiman Shah (shown above).

In 1679 Ayuthaya mounted a final offensive to quash the Singora rebellion. Samuel Potts, a British East India Company trader based in Singora, recorded the city's preparations for war:

This King has fortified his City, gunned his Forts upon the hills, making all the provision he can for his defence, not knowing how soon the King of Siam will oppose him.

— Samuel Potts, Samuel Potts at Sangora to Richard Burnaby at Siam, 22 January 1679.

In a letter dated August 1679 Potts informed his East India Company colleague that the Siamese fleet had arrived and stressed the impending danger. The events that followed were decisive: in 1680, after a siege lasting more than six months, Singora was destroyed and abandoned. Contemporary French sources document the city's destruction and provide a wealth of detail. The head of the French East India Company's operations in Ayuthaya described how Singora's "trés bonne citadelle" had been razed after a war of more than thirty years; a missionary working in Ayuthaya in the mid 1680s told how the King of Siam sent his finest ships to destroy the sultanate "de fond en comble" (from top to bottom). Simon de la Loubère, France's envoy to Siam in 1687, recounted a story about a French cannoneer who crept into the city one night and single-handedly captured the sultan:

Some have upon this account informed me a thing, which in my opinion, will appear most incredible. 'Tis of a provincial named Cyprian, who is still at Surat in the French Company's Service, if he has not quitted it, or if he is not lately dead: the name of his Family I know not. Before his entrance into the Companies service, he had served some time in the King of Siam's Army in quality of Canoneer (...) Cyprian wearied with seeing the Armies in view, which attempted no persons life, determin'd one night to go alone to the Camp of the Rebels, and to fetch the King of Singor into his Tent. He took him indeed, and brought him to the Siamese General, and so terminated a War of above twenty years.

— Simon de la Loubère, A New Historical Relation of the Kingdom of Siam, 1693.

While Loubère's account of life in 17th-century Siam was well received by his contemporaries in France, the veracity of his tale about Cyprian and Singora's demise has been questioned. An article published in the Journal of the Royal Asiatic Society of Great Britain and Ireland, for example, described it as "a story which might have passed in a romantic age, but it is too improbable for history". In a memo dated 1685 a French East India Company official claimed that Singora was finally captured by means of a ruse. Thailand's Ministry of Culture supports this version of events and discusses a spy who tricked his way into the city, enabling Siamese troops to enter and burn it to the ground.

=== Cession to France ===
In 1685 Siam attempted to cede Singora to France: the hope was that the French East India Company, supported by a garrison of troops, could rebuild the city, establish a trading post and counter the strong regional Dutch influence. The city was offered to France's envoy to Siam, the Chevalier de Chaumont, and a provisional treaty signed in December; Siamese ambassador Kosa Pan sailed to France the following year to ratify the cession. The French, however, were not interested: Secretary of State for the Navy, the Marquis de Seignelay, told Kosa Pan that Singora was ruined and of no further use, and asked for a trading post in Bangkok instead.

== Landmarks ==
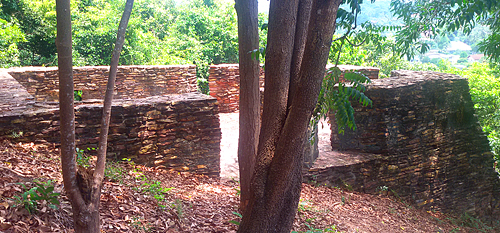
Typical of forts on the mountain is fort 4: it is built onto the slope of Khao Daeng, abutting the mountain at its rear and rising to a height of about 4.4 metres along the front. Internal dimensions are approximately 5.5 metres by 8.5 metres.

After Singora had been destroyed, Sultan Sulaiman's sons were pardoned and assigned to new positions in Siam. Later generations of Sultan Sulaiman's family were closely connected with Siamese royalty: two of Sulaiman's descendants commanded armed forces led by Prince Surasi in the 1786 conquest of Pattani; Princess Sri Sulalai, a consort of King Rama II and mother of King Rama III, was also descended from Sultan Sulaiman. Present-day descendants include Admiral Niphon Sirithorn, a former Commander-in-Chief of the Royal Thai Navy General Chavalit Yongchaiyudh, the 22nd Prime Minister of Thailand; and a family of silk weavers at the Muslim village of Phumriang in Surat Thani.

=== The forts at Khao Daeng ===
Thailand's Ministry of Culture details the remains of fourteen forts on and around Khao Daeng Mountain. Forts 4, 8 and 9 are well preserved and characterise the sultanate's military architecture: fort 4 can be reached by ascending a flight of steps that starts behind the archaeological information centre, fort 8 is accessible via a stairway near the Sultan Sulaiman Shah mosque, fort 9 sits atop a small motte near the main road leading from Singha Nakhon to Ko Yo Island. Forts 5 and 6 occupy the upper slopes of the mountain and offer panoramic views of Lake Songkhla and the Gulf of Thailand. The two pagodas on the summit of Khao Daeng were built on the base of fort 10 during the 1830s to commemorate the suppression of rebellions in Kedah.

In her book In the Land of Lady White Blood: Southern Thailand and the Meaning of History, Lorraine Gesick discussed a manuscript from Wat Pha Kho in Sathing Phra. The manuscript (which in Gesick's opinion dates from the late 17th century) consists mainly of an illustrated map about ten metres long that depicts Sultan Sulaiman's forts at Khao Daeng. A microfilm of this manuscript, made by American historian David Wyatt, is kept at the Cornell University Library.

=== The tomb of Sultan Sulaiman Shah ===
Located in a Muslim graveyard about 1 kilometre (0.62 mi) north of Khao Daeng, the tomb of Sultan Sulaiman Shah is housed in a small, Thai-style pavilion surrounded by large trees. The cemetery is mentioned in the Sejarah Kerajaan Melayu Patani (History of the Malay Kingdom of Patani), a Javi account drawn mostly from the Hikayat Patani. The text describes Sultan Sulaiman as a Muslim raja who died in battle and the cemetery as "full of nothing but jungle". The tomb is an object of pilgrimage in the deep south of Thailand, where Sultan Sulaiman is revered by Muslims and Buddhists alike.

=== The Dutch cemetery ===
About 300 metres (980 ft) from the tomb of Sultan Sulaiman is a Dutch cemetery known locally as the Vilanda Graveyard. (Note: The sign in front of the Dutch cemetery reads "The old Songkhla or Singkhora was an important international entrepôt during the 17th century A.D. for several reasons. For example, located on the eastern coast of Thailand it provided foreign ships with an efficient access to exchange markets. Furthermore, the duty-free economic policy proposed by the governor had attracted numerous merchants from various countries. Dutch merchants were among those foreigners who conducted business with Songkhla. Those Dutch merchants had even set up a company (...) to sell their pepper, which was a principal trade item. Evidence of Dutch's [sic] economic contact and settlement at Songkhla is a cemetery known locally as Vilanda Graveyard and remains of Dutch wares found in the area.") The cemetery is located within the grounds of a PTT petroleum complex; permission is needed to gain access. In 1998 an investigation of the cemetery was conducted using ground-penetrating radar. The survey yielded detailed radargrams showing subsurface lime coffins that belonged to Singora's 17th-century Dutch community. A paper discussing these findings was presented to the IV meeting of the Environmental and Engineering Geophysical Society in Barcelona, September 1998.

== The Singora cannon ==
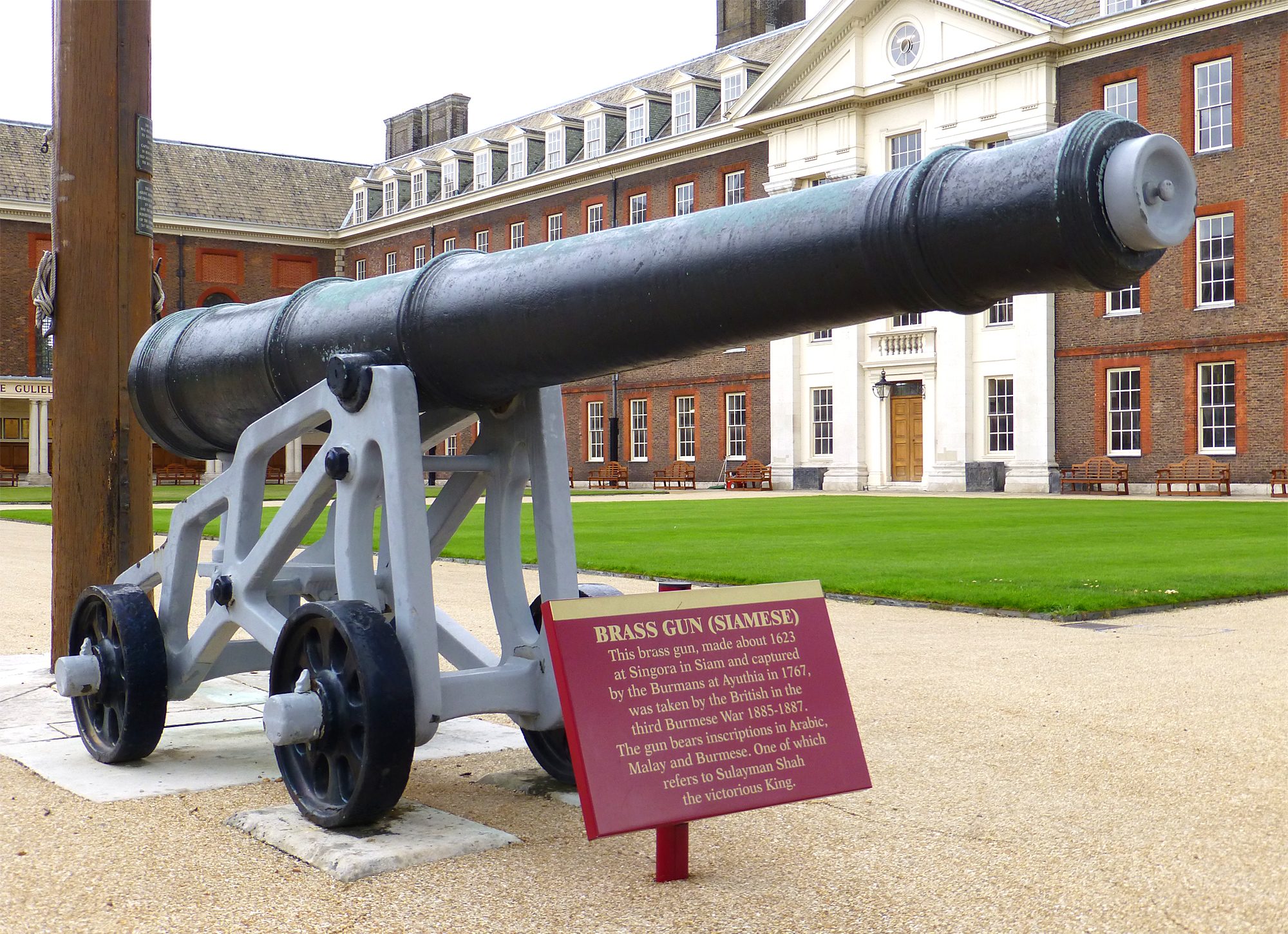
The Singora cannon next to the flagpole in the grounds of the Figure Court at the Royal Hospital Chelsea, London. The cannon was one of several shipped from Burma to England at General Prendergast's request. While the sign in front of the cannon states that it was "made about 1623", two articles published in the Journal of the Malaysian Branch of the Royal Asiatic Society translate the date as 4 Dhu al-Qi'dah 1063, which in the Gregorian calendar corresponds to 26 September 1653.

Following Singora's destruction, Siamese troops seized and sent to Ayuthaya an inscribed cannon. The cannon remained there until it was captured during the Burmese-Siamese war of 1765–1767 and transported to Burma. It was then taken by the British in the third Anglo-Burmese War (1885–1887) and shipped to England. In 1887 it was presented to the Royal Hospital Chelsea in London and put on display next to the flagpole in the grounds of the Figure Court. The cannon bears eleven inscriptions, nine of which have been carved in Arabic characters and inlaid with silver. One inscription refers to the engraver, Tun Juma'at Abu Mandus of Singora; another is set within a circular arabesque design and reads "The seal of Sultan Sulaiman Shah, the Victorious King".

Sources pertaining to the Singora cannon's journey to London include the Hmannan Yazawin (the first official chronicle of Burma's Konbaung dynasty) and reports written by General Sir Harry Prendergast, commander of the Burma Expeditionary Force that captured Mandalay in the third Anglo-Burmese war. The Hmannan Yazawin provides an inventory of weapons taken by the Burmese after the sack of Ayuthaya, noting that most guns were destroyed and only the finest pieces conveyed to Burma. Correspondence between General Prendergast and his superiors in India details ordnance seized during the Burma campaign and lists cannon sent as presents to Queen Victoria, the Viceroy of India, British governors of Madras and Bombay, the Royal Naval College in Greenwich, Portsmouth and Plymouth dockyards, and the Royal Hospital Chelsea. A letter at the Royal Hospital refers to the Singora cannon as a Burmese trophy gun received from the Government of India in October 1887.

== Notes ==
Historical sources

- The manuscript A Letter of Instructions from the East Indian Company to its Agent, Circ. 1614 is part of the British Library's Cottonian collection, reference Otho E. VIII ff. 231–240.
- The quote from Dutch Papers: Extracts from the "Dagh Register" 1624–1642 was translated into English from Dagh-Register Gehouden int Casteel Batavia 1641–1642. The quoted passage (in Dutch) is on page 154.
- Samuel Potts' letters from Singora to his East India Company colleagues in Ayuthaya are bundled together in Syam Coppy Booke of Letters Received from Severall Places, part of the British Library's Factory Records: Siam (1678–1683) collection, reference IOR/G/33/1 ff.1–18.
- The French memo discussing Singora's destruction and the ruse employed by Siamese troops is titled Lettre de Veret aux Directeurs de la Compagnie (12 Décembre 1685) and kept at the Archives Nationales d'Outre-Mer, France.
- General Prendergast's list of cannon intended as presents for British royalty, senior officers and military establishments is part of the British Library's Proceedings of the Government of India Military Department: Burma 1885–86, reference IOR/L/MIL/17/19/30. A summary of ordnance captured during the Burma campaign (including 158 brass or bronze cannon taken from Mandalay Palace) was published in The London Gazette, 22 June 1886.

Miscellaneous notes

== Sources ==
Vajiranana National Library, Bangkok

- Dutch Papers: Extracts from the "Dagh Register" 1624–1642, Bangkok, Thailand: Vajiranana National Library, 1915
- Records of the Relations between Siam and Foreign Countries in the 17th Century. Volume 2, 1634–1680, Bangkok, Thailand: Vajiranana National Library, 1916

PhD theses

- Chounchaisit, Pensuda (2007), The Study of Cultural Heritage Management of Wat Matchimawat (Wat Klang), Songkhla (PDF), Thailand: Silpakorn University, archived from the original (PDF) on 11 November 2014
- Na Pombejra, Dhiravat (1984), A Political History of Siam under the Prasatthong Dynasty: 1629–1688, England: School of Oriental and African Studies, University of London
- Putthongchai, Songsiri (2013), What is it Like to be Muslim in Thailand?, England: University of Exeter

Books and monographs

- Colenbrander, Dr H. T. (1900), Dagh-Register Gehouden int Casteel Batavia 1641–1642, Leiden: Martinus Nijhoff
- Cortesão, Armando (1944), The Suma Oriental of Tomé Pires, London: Hakluyt Society
- Dixon, Chris (1991), South East Asia in the World-Economy, Cambridge: Cambridge University Press, ISBN 052131237X
- Falarti, Maziar Mozaffari (2013), Malay Kingship in Kedah: Religion, Trade, and Society, Plymouth, England: Lexington Books, ISBN 978-0739168424
- Gervaise, Nicolas (1688), Histoire Naturelle et Politique du Royaume de Siam, Paris, France: Claude Barbin
- Gesick, Lorraine (1995), In the Land of Lady White Blood: Southern Thailand and the Meaning of History, Ithaca, USA: Cornell University Southeast Asia Program, ISBN 0877277176
- Ibn Muhammad Ibrahim (1972), The Ship of Sulaiman, Translated by John O'Kane, New York: Columbia University Press, ISBN 023103654X
- Jacq-Hergoualc'h, Michel (1993), L'Europe et le Siam du XVIe au XVIIe Siecle, Paris, France: L'Harmattan, ISBN 2738419739
- Loubère, Simon de la (1693), A New Historical Relation of the Kingdom of Siam. Volume 1, London, England: Horne
- Montesano, Michael (2008), Thai South and Malay North: Ethnic Interactions on a Plural Peninsula, Singapore: NUS Press, ISBN 978-9971694111
- Phattanaviriyapisarn, A.; Lohawijarn, W.; Srisuchat, T. (1998), "Radar Investigation of Ancient Dutch Cemetery in Southern Thailand", Proceedings of the IV Meeting of the Environmental and Engineering Geophysical Society, Madrid, Spain: Instituto Geográfico Nacional, pp. 727–730, ISBN 8484978176
- Syukri, Ibrahim (1985), History of the Malay Kingdom of Patani, USA: Ohio University Press, ISBN 0896801233
- Tavernier, John Baptista (1678), The Six Voyages of John Baptista Tavernier. Part II, London, England
- Umar, Umaiyah Haji (2003), The Assimilation of Bangkok-Melayu Communities in the Bangkok Metropolis and Surrounding Areas, Malaysia: Kuala Lumpur: Allwrite. Sdn. Bhd., ISBN 9749121341

Journal of the Siam Society

- Hutchinson, E.W. (1933), "The French Foreign Mission in Siam During the XVIIth Century" (PDF), Journal of the Siam Society, 26 (1): 1–71, ISSN 0857-7099
- Iwamoto, Yoshiteru; Bytheway, Simon James (2011), "Japan's Official Relations with Shamuro (Siam), 1599–1745" (PDF), Journal of the Siam Society, 99: 81–104, ISSN 0857-7099
- Love, Ronald S. (1994), "Simon de la Loubère: French Views of Siam in the 1680s" (PDF), Journal of the Siam Society, 82: 155–164, ISSN 0857-7099
- Phraison Salarak, Luang (1914–1915), "Intercourse between Burma and Siam as Recorded in Hmannan Yazawindawgyi" (PDF), Journal of the Siam Society, 11 (3): 1–67, ISSN 0857-7099
- Ravenswaay, L.F. van (1910), "Translation of Van Vliet's Description of the Kingdom of Siam" (PDF), Journal of the Siam Society, 7 (1): 1–108, ISSN 0857-7099
- Scrivener, R.S. (1981), "The Siamese Brass Cannon in the Figure Court of the Royal Hospital, Chelsea, London" (PDF), Journal of the Siam Society, 69: 169–170, ISSN 0857-7099
- Scupin, Raymond (1980), "Islam in Thailand before the Bangkok Period" (PDF), Journal of the Siam Society, 68 (1): 55–71, ISSN 0857-7099
- Sportès, Morgan; Chansang, Kanika (1995), "Kosapan Face aux Intrigues Françaises" (PDF), Journal of the Siam Society, 83: 79–91, ISSN 0857-7099

Journals of the Royal Asiatic Society

- Blagden, C.O. (1941), "A XVIIth Century Malay Cannon in London", Journal of the Malayan Branch of the Royal Asiatic Society, 19 (1): 122–124, ISSN 0126-7353, JSTOR 41559979
- Low, Captain James (1837), "History of Tennasserim", Journal of the Royal Asiatic Society of Great Britain and Ireland, 4 (2): 304–332, ISSN 0035-869X, JSTOR 25207503
- Maxwell, W.G. (1910), "A Letter of Instructions from the East Indian Company to its Agent, Circ. 1614", Journal of the Straits Branch of the Royal Asiatic Society, 54: 63–98, ISSN 2304-7534
- Muller, Dr. Hendrik P.N. (1914), "The Malay Peninsula and Europe in the Past", Journal of the Straits Branch of the Royal Asiatic Society, 67: 57–84, ISSN 2304-7534
- Sweeney, Amin (1971), "Some Observations on the Malay Sha'ir", Journal of the Malaysian Branch of the Royal Asiatic Society, 44 (1): 52–70, ISSN 0126-7353, JSTOR 41492377

Other journals

- Choungsakul, Srisuporn (2006), "The Role of Chinese Traders on the Growth of Songkhla" (PDF), Manusya Journal of Humanities, 9 (2), Bangkok: Chulalongkorn University: 44–65, doi:10.1163/26659077-00902003, ISSN 0859-9920
- Jacq-Hergoualc'h, Michel (1995), "La France et le Siam de 1680 à 1685", Revue Française d'Histoire d'Outre-Mer, 82 (308), Paris: Société Française d'Histoire d'Outre-Mer: 257–275, doi:10.3406/outre.1995.3340, ISSN 0300-9513
- Kyan, Daw (1979), "Prizes of War, 1885" (PDF), Myanmar Historical Research Journal, 3, Naypyitaw: Department of Historical Research: 127–143, archived from the original (PDF) on 11 July 2015
- Sportès, Morgan (1994), "We are Siamese if You Please" (PDF), The UNESCO Courier, 47, Paris: UNESCO: 48–49, ISSN 1993-8616

Websites: Ministry of Culture, Thailand

- "Singora Forts and City Walls". Ministry of Culture, Thailand (in Thai). Archived from the original on 2 January 2014.
- "The Dutch Cemetery". Ministry of Culture, Thailand (in Thai). Archived from the original on 2 January 2014.
- "The Tomb of Sultan Sulaiman Shah". Ministry of Culture, Thailand (in Thai). Archived from the original on 21 May 2014.
- "The Two Pagodas". Ministry of Culture, Thailand (in Thai). Archived from the original on 17 December 2014.

Websites: other

- "Family History of Sultan Sulaiman". Royal Thai Navy (in Thai). Archived from the original on 2 January 2014.
- "Good Man Town" (PDF). Surat Thani Province Office of Tourism and Sports. Archived from the original (PDF) on 13 March 2014.
- "The History of Phattalung Province". Phattalung District Office (in Thai). Archived from the original on 2 January 2014.
