= Sri Sulalai =

Siamese consort, mother of King Rama III

Sri Sulalai; ศรีสุลาลัย
- Princess Mother of Siam
- Born: Riam; 1770; Nonthaburi, Thonburi
- Died: 1837 (aged 66–67); Bangkok, Siam
- Spouse: Phutthaloetla Naphalai (Rama II)
- Issue: Nangklao (Rama III); Pom; Nu Dam
Posthumous name
- Somdet Phra Sri Sulalai
- House: Chakri dynasty (by marriage)
- Father: Bunchan
- Mother: Pheng
- Religion: Islam

Sri Sulalai (Note: Thai: ศรีสุลาลัย; RTGS: Si Sulalai) (1770–1837), née Riam (Note: Thai: เรียม), was the consort of Phutthaloetla Naphalai, Rama II of Siam and was the mother of Nangklao, Rama III.

She was of Persian and Malay of Sultanate of Singora descent and her family was Muslim from the Southern part of the Kingdom. She married Prince Itsarasunthon as the second concubine and gave birth to Prince Thap (later Prince Chetsadabodin) in 1787.

In 1809, Prince Itsarasunthon was crowned as King Phutthaloetla Naphalai. Chao Chom Manda Riam then moved to the Royal Grand Palace and presided over the royal kitchen. Prince Chetsadabodin was trusted by the king to handle various state affairs. In 1824, King Phutthaloetla Naphalai died. According to the tradition, the throne would go to Prince Mongkut, the son of Queen Sri Suriyendra. However, the nobility instead enthroned Prince Chetsadabodin because he had served the king in Kromma Tha (Ministry of Trade and Foreign Affairs) for years and was proved to be competent to rule.

As her son was crowned, Noble Consort Riam was raised to Princess Mother Sri Sulalai, thus a member of the royalty. Her son also constructed a mosque in her honor. She died in 1837.

== Notes ==
Honorary titles
Preceded by Queen Sri Suriyendra	Eldest Royal Member of the Chakri Dynasty; 1836–1837	Succeeded by Princess Phlap
