= Wat Ratchanatdaram =

Buddhist temple in Bangkok

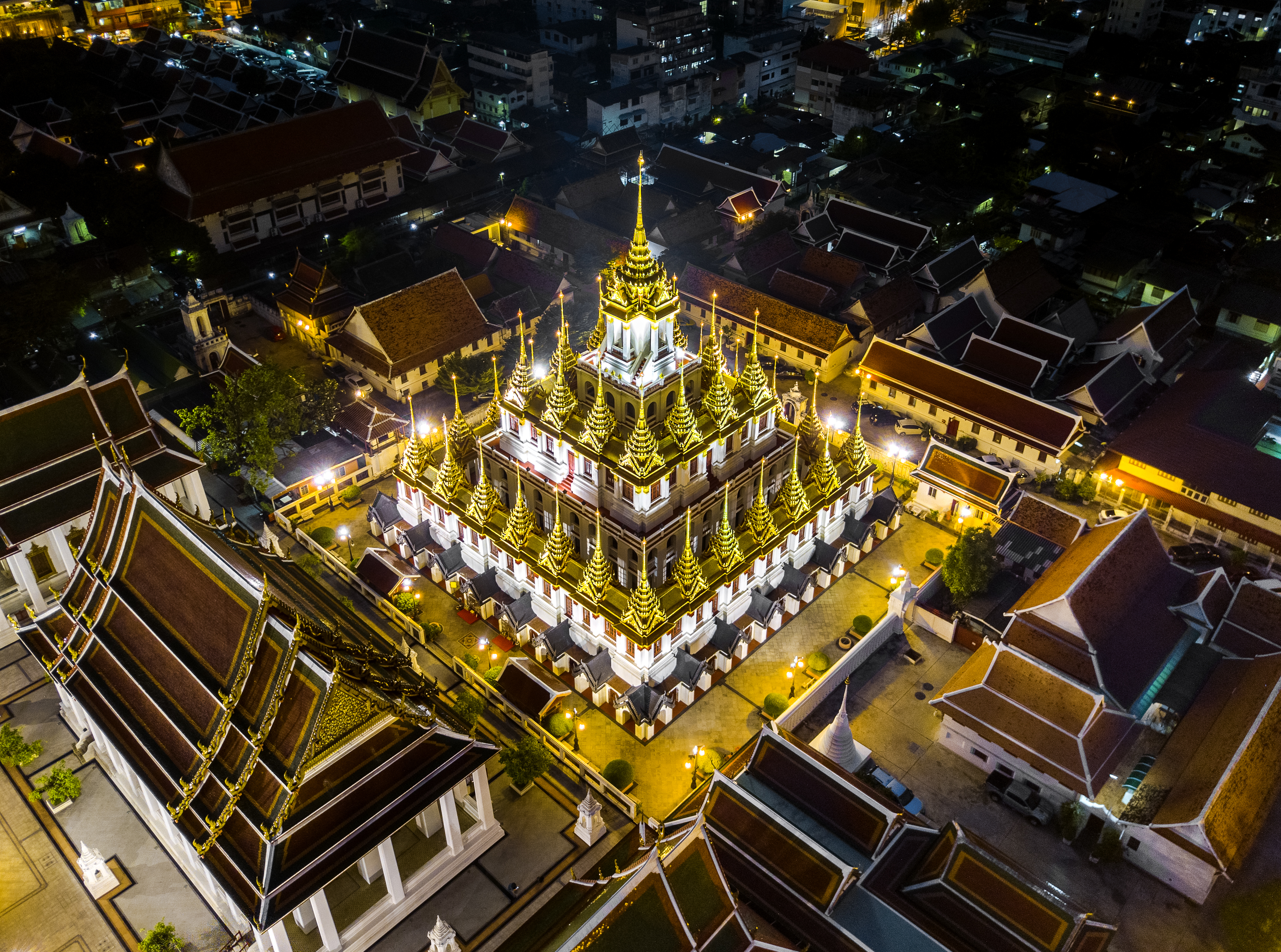
- Loha Prasat

- Location within Bangkok

Religion
- Affiliation: Buddhism
- Status: Active

Location
- Country: Thailand
- Coordinates: 13.755616°N 100.503930°E

Architecture
- Founder: King Nangklao (Rama III)
- Completed: 2007

Wat Ratchanatdaram (Thai: วัดราชนัดดาราม, pronounced [wát râːt.t͡ɕʰā.nát.dāːrāːm]) is a Buddhist temple (wat) located at the intersection between Ratchadamnoen Klang and Maha Chai Road, in Phra Nakhon district, Bangkok. Meaning Temple of the Royal Niece, the temple was built to the order of King Nangklao (Rama III) for his granddaughter, Princess Somanass Waddhanawathy in 1846. It is popularly known as Loha Prasat, literally meaning the iron palace.

== Etymology ==
The name loha prasat, literally means metal castle. The 37 spires of the temple have a metallic finish giving the entire structure a metal like look and hence the name. The 37 spires represent the 37 Bodhipakkhiya Dharma in Buddhism.

== History ==
Although the structure was conceived in 1846 during the reign of King (Rama III) it was not completed during his reign. Several attempts were made by King Rama III's successor to complete it but it was only in 1960, under Rama IX, that construction was restarted. It was supervised by the Fine Arts Department of Thailand. In 1995 a Buddha relic was enshrined at the topmost spire of the Loha Parsat. In 2007 it was opened to public.

== Architecture ==
Loha Prasat (โลหะปราสาท) means iron castle or iron monastery. The 36-meter-high (118 ft) structure is composed of seven stories divided into three levels. The bottom has 24 spires, the middle 12 and the top level has 1 spire. The top-most spire houses the Buddha relic.

A pyramid like structure created by the outer building is the widest, The next one smaller than the previous. At the ground floor there is a labyrinth supported by a great number of columns. Pictures describing the history of structure were installed in the corridors in late 2007.

The Loha Prasat at Wat Ratchanatdaram is based on an old Buddhist design and is modelled after two earlier similar structures in Shravasti, India and Anuradhapura, Sri Lanka, both of which no longer exist. The Indian Loha Prasat contained 1,000 rooms with a golden spire on top. The Sri Lankan Loha Prasat had nine floors and the roof was thatched with copper. Precious stones, wood and ivory decorated the walls. This Laoha Prasat is the one of two remaining.

== Gallery ==
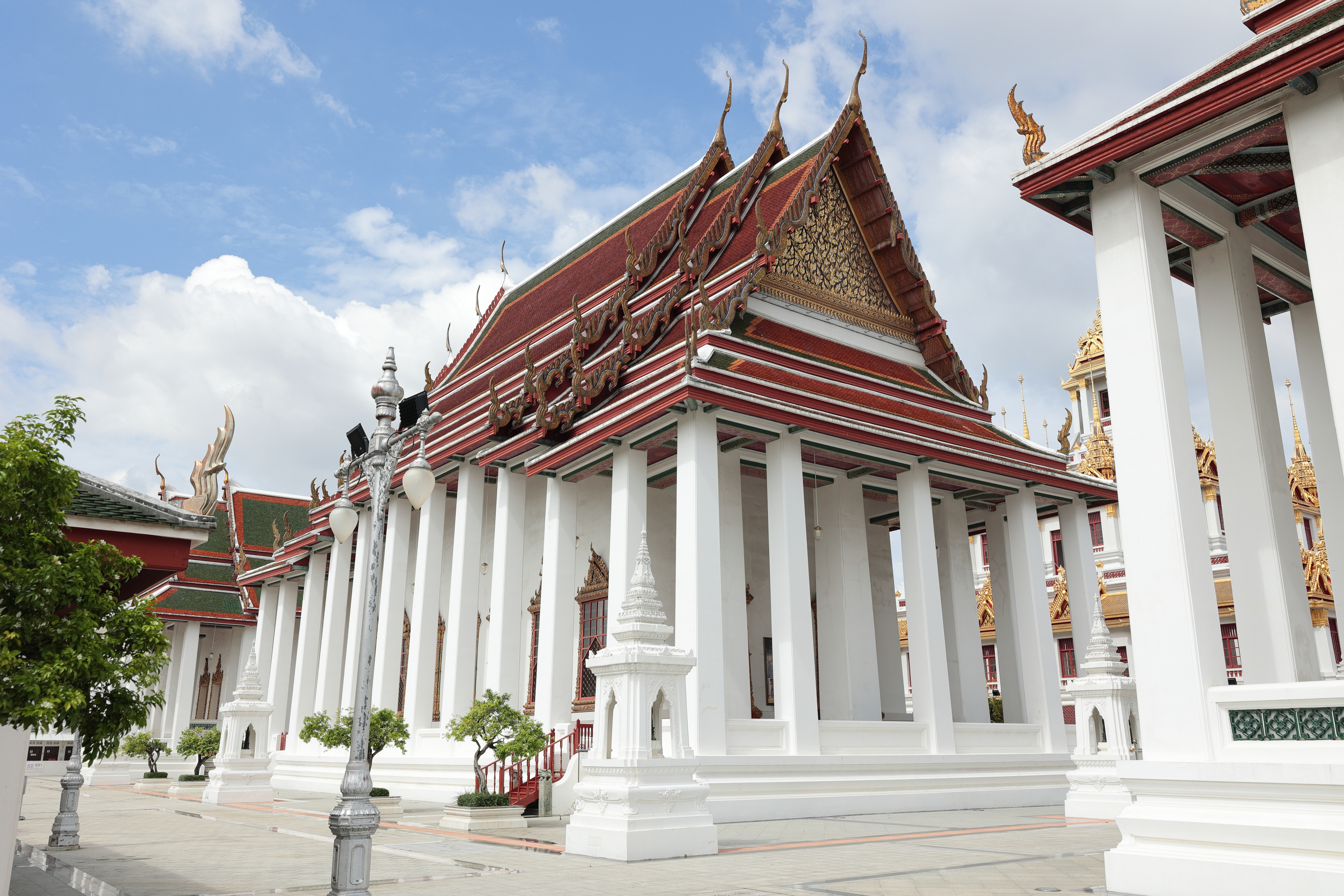
Phra Ubosot

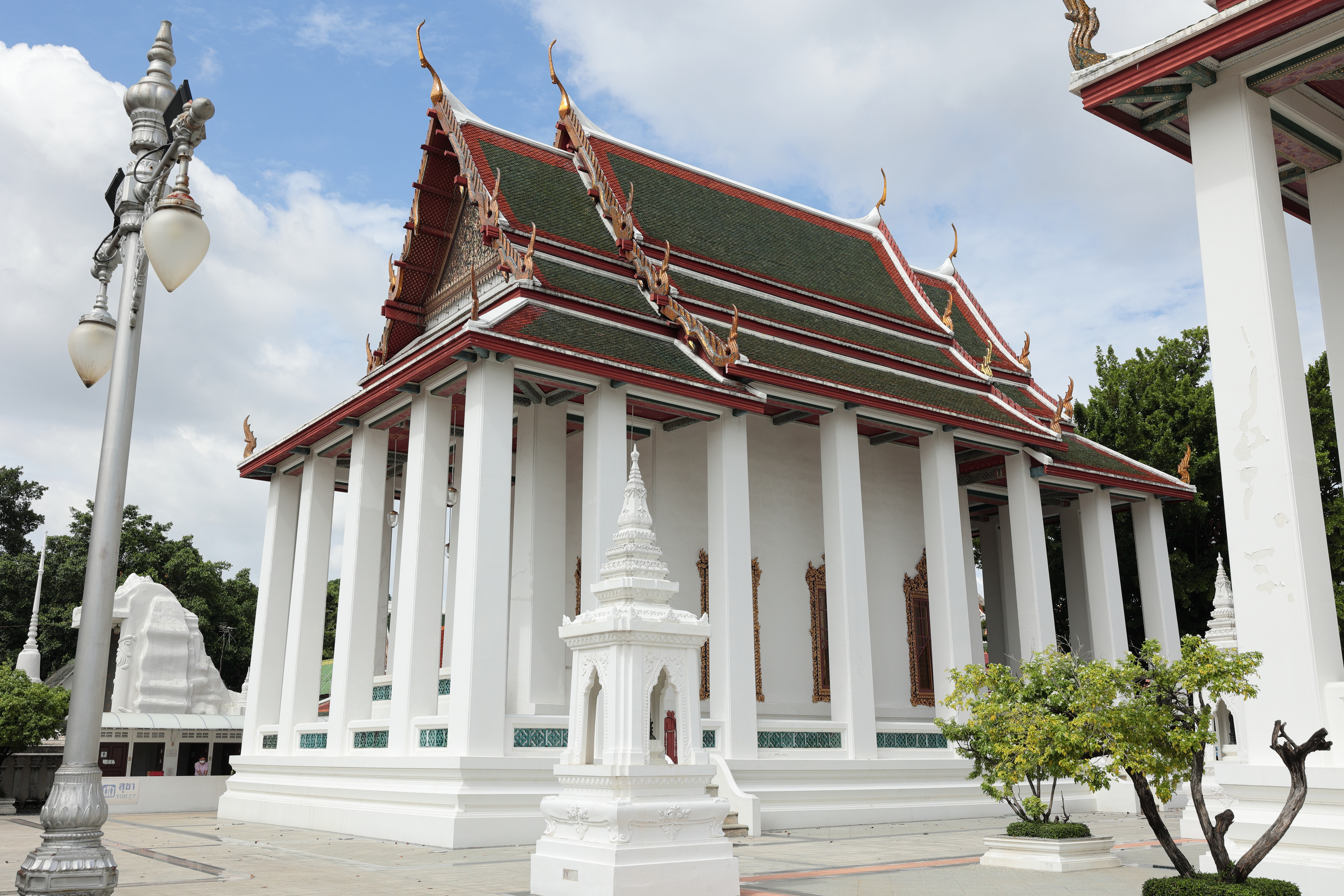
Phra Vihara

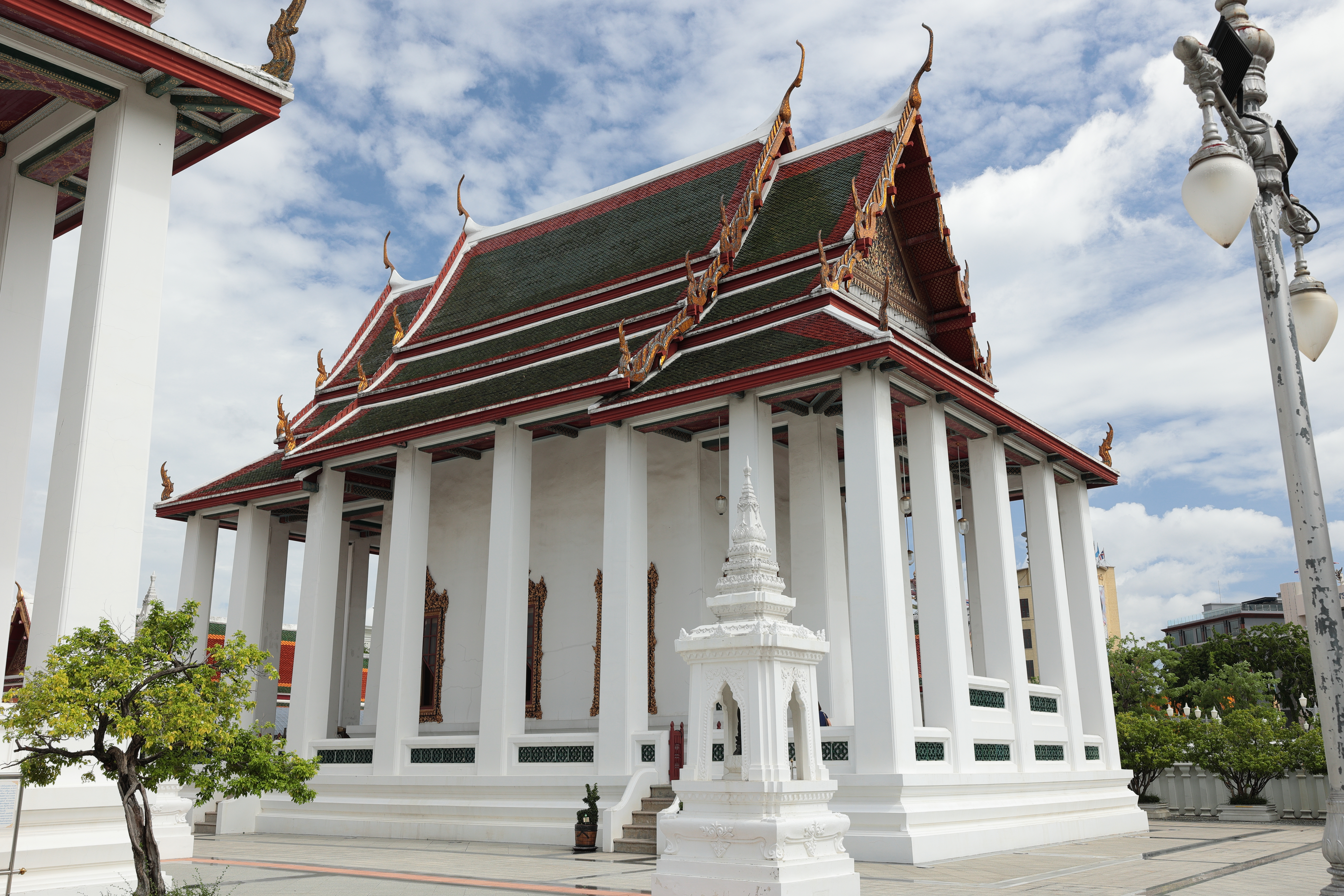
Sala Karn Parien

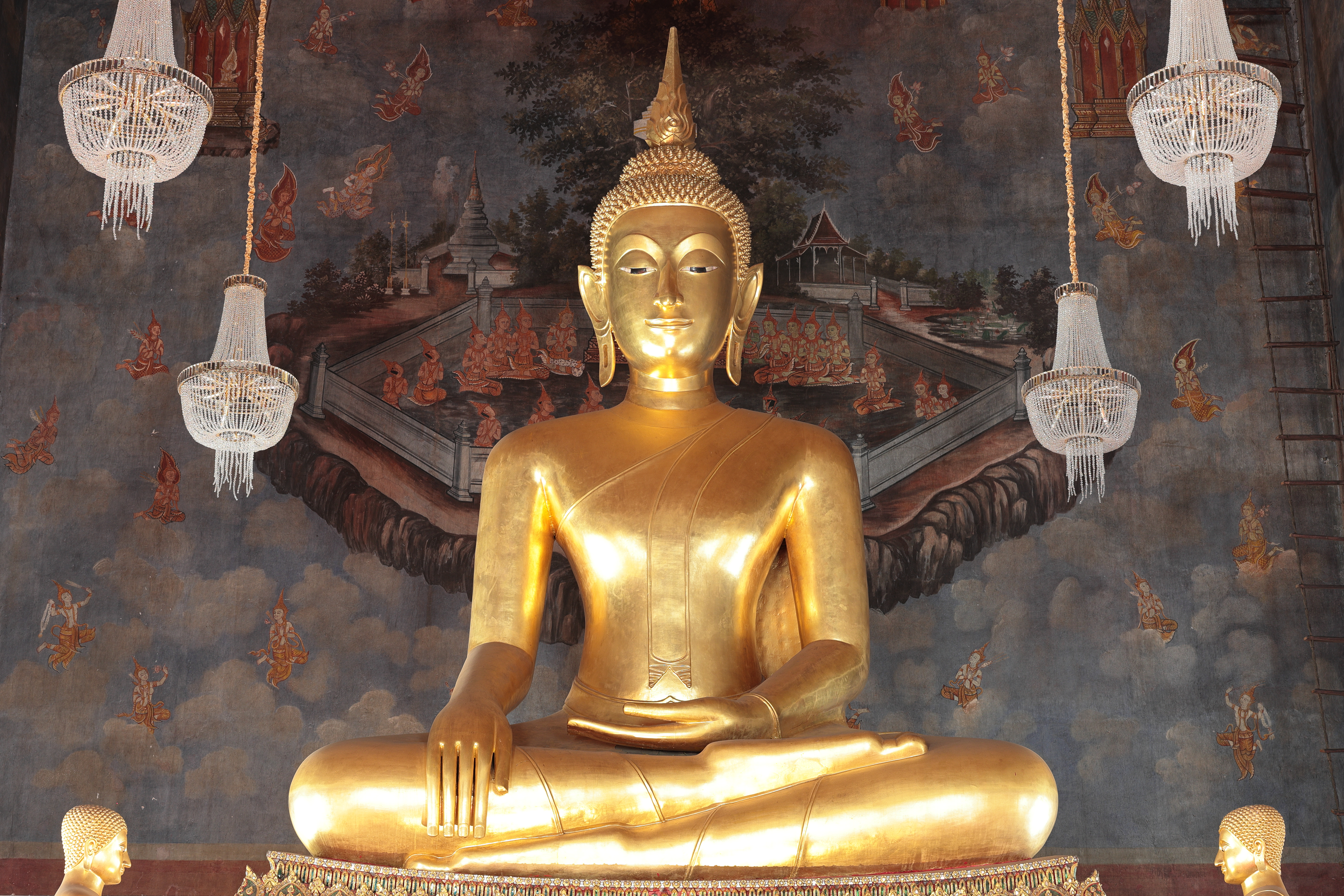

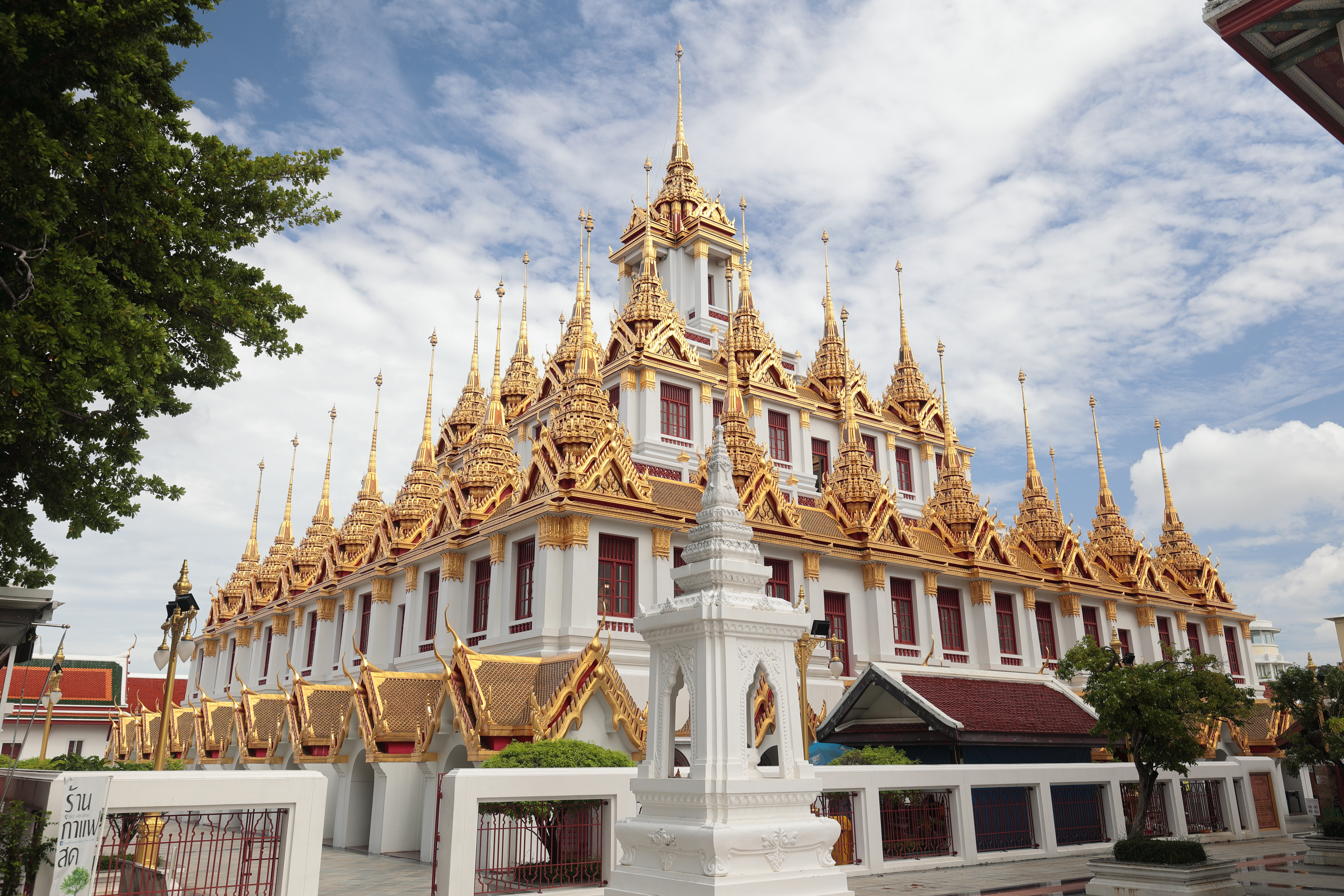
Loha Prasat

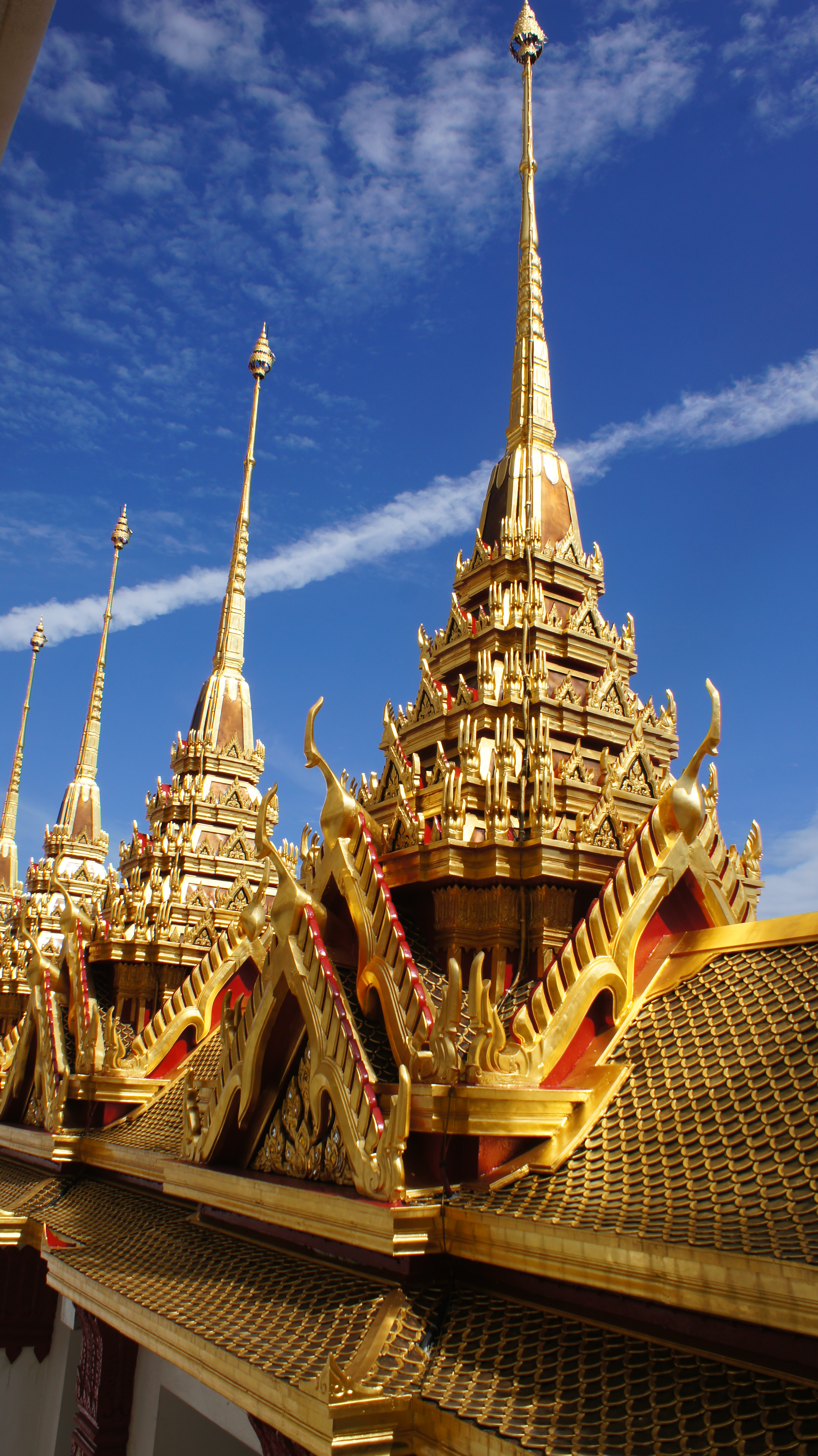

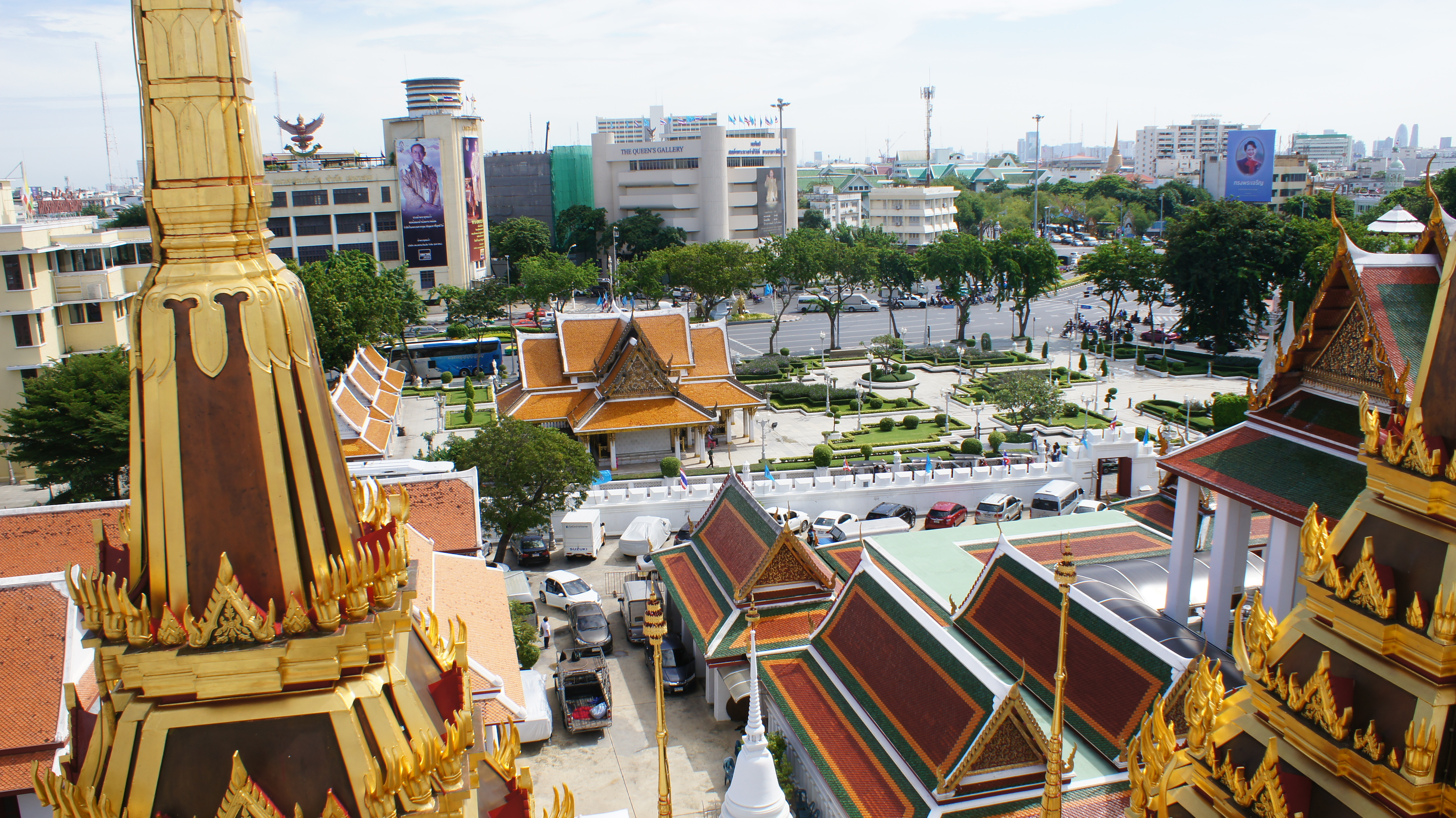

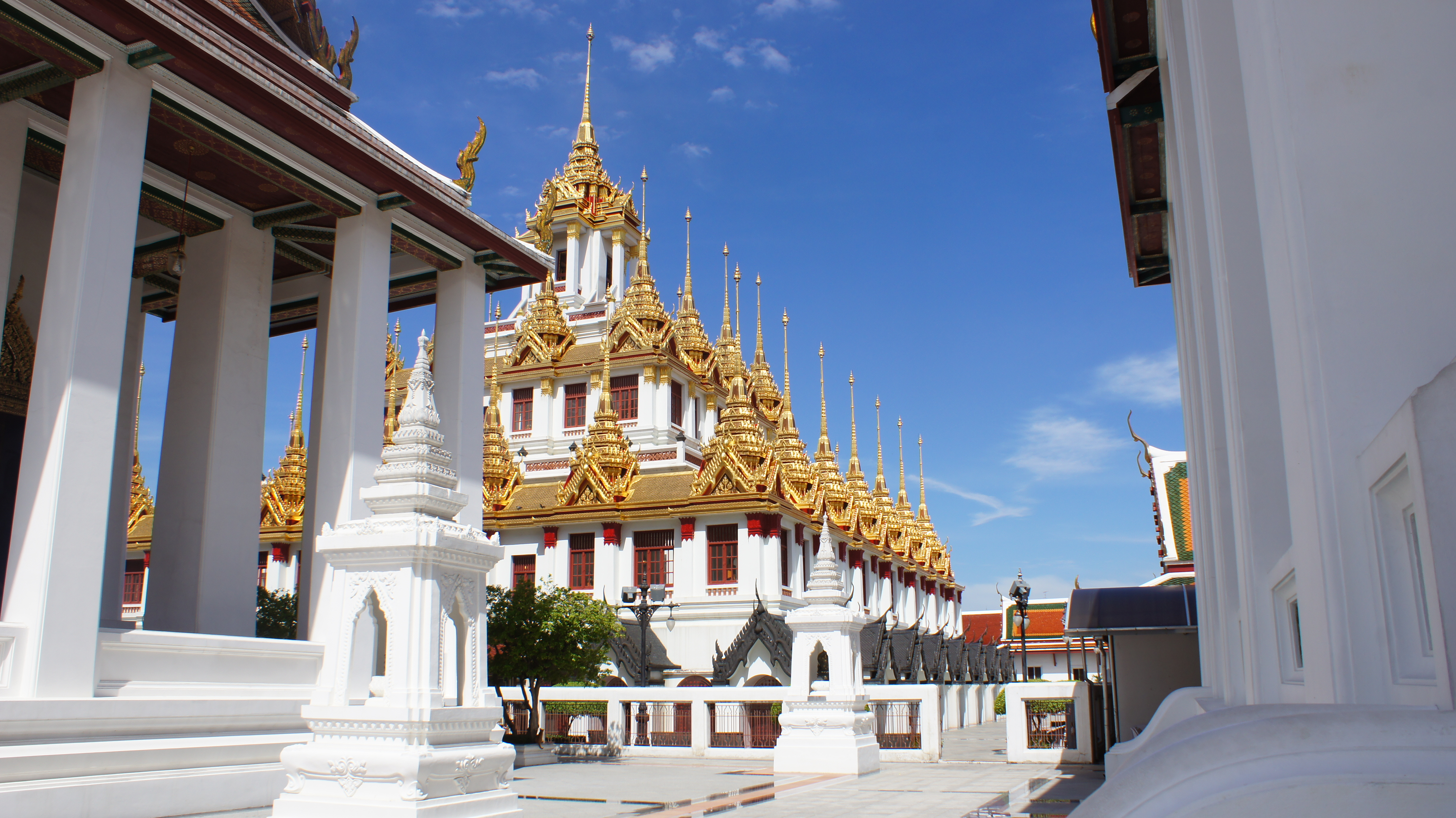

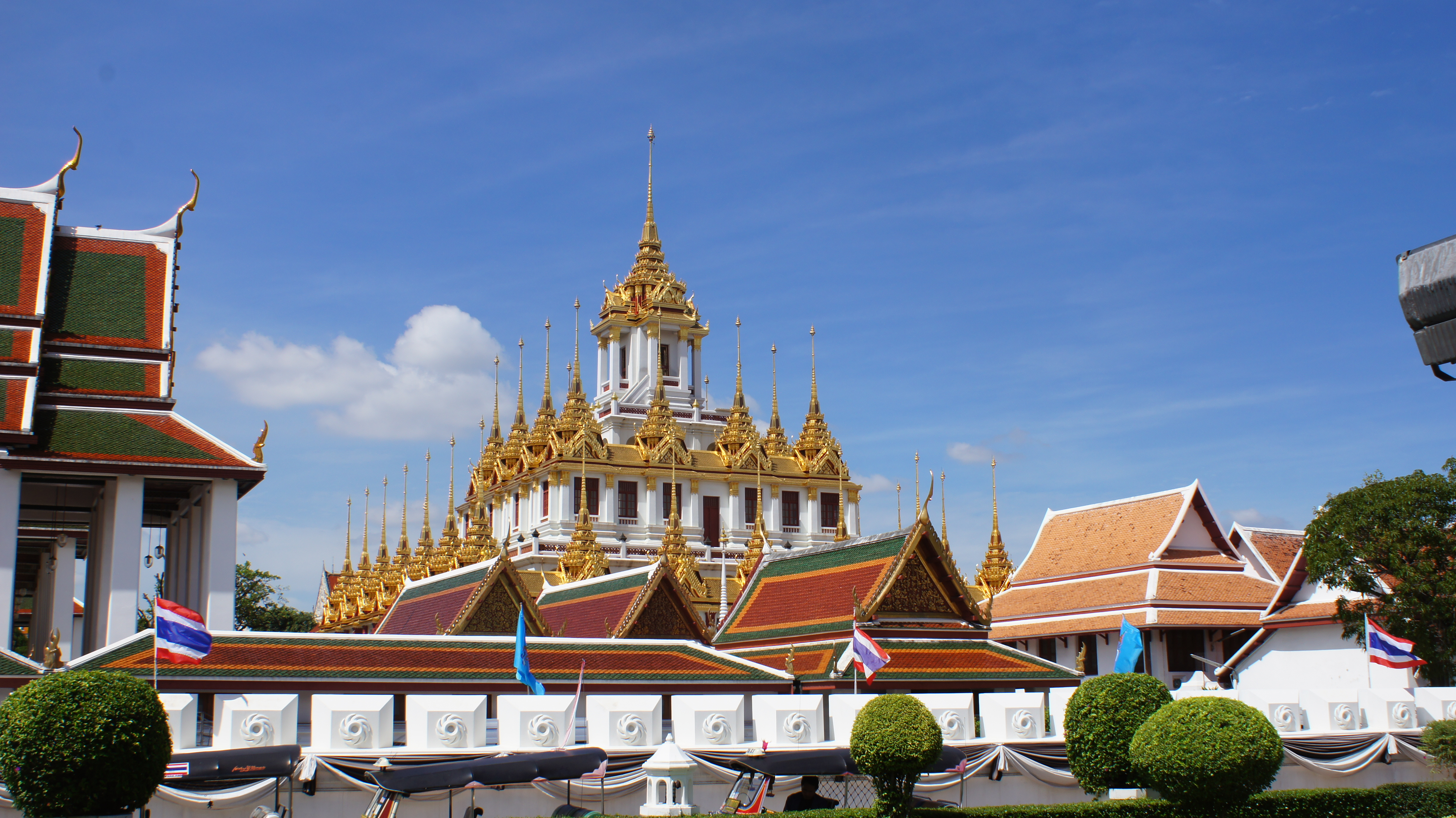

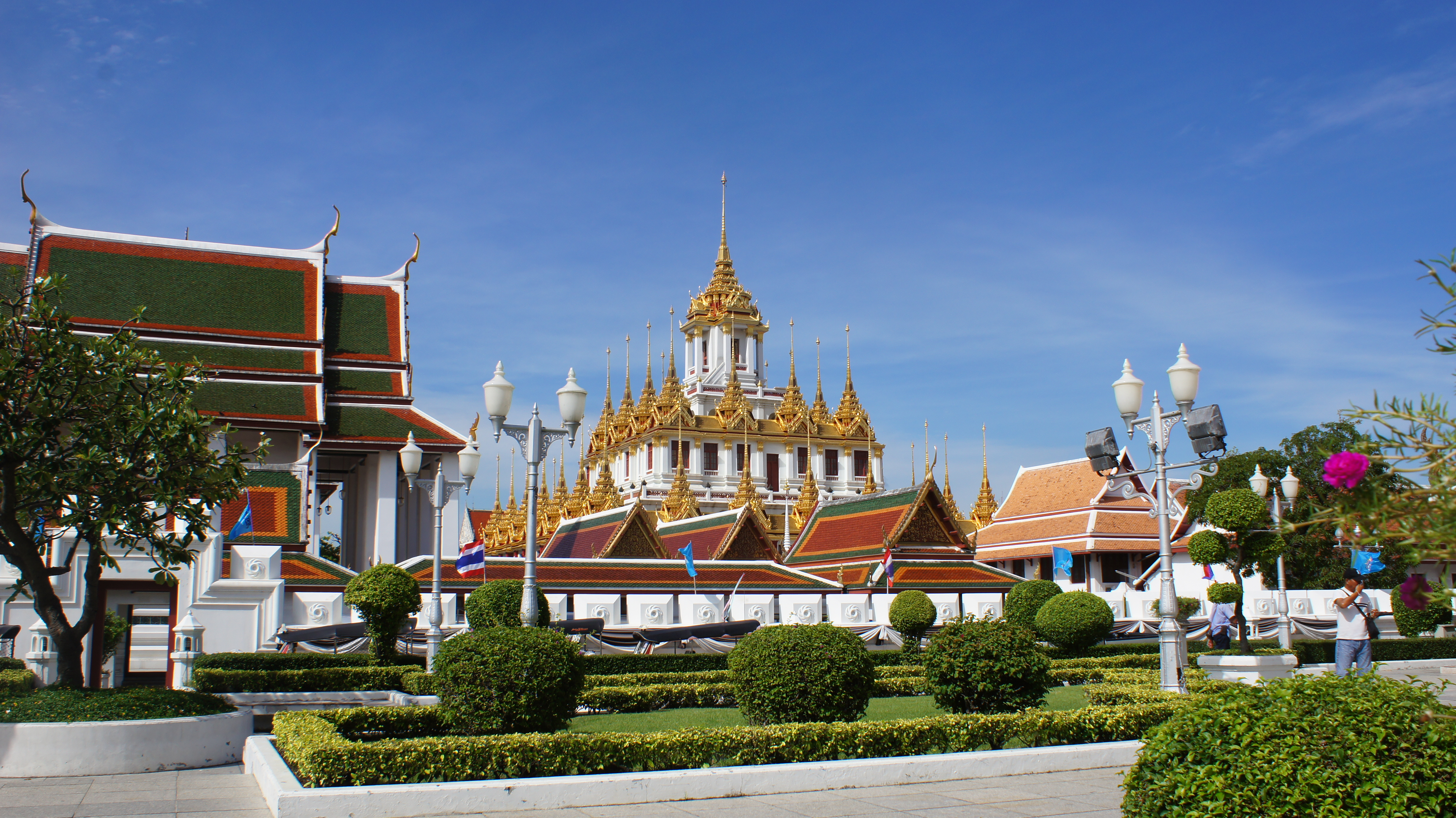

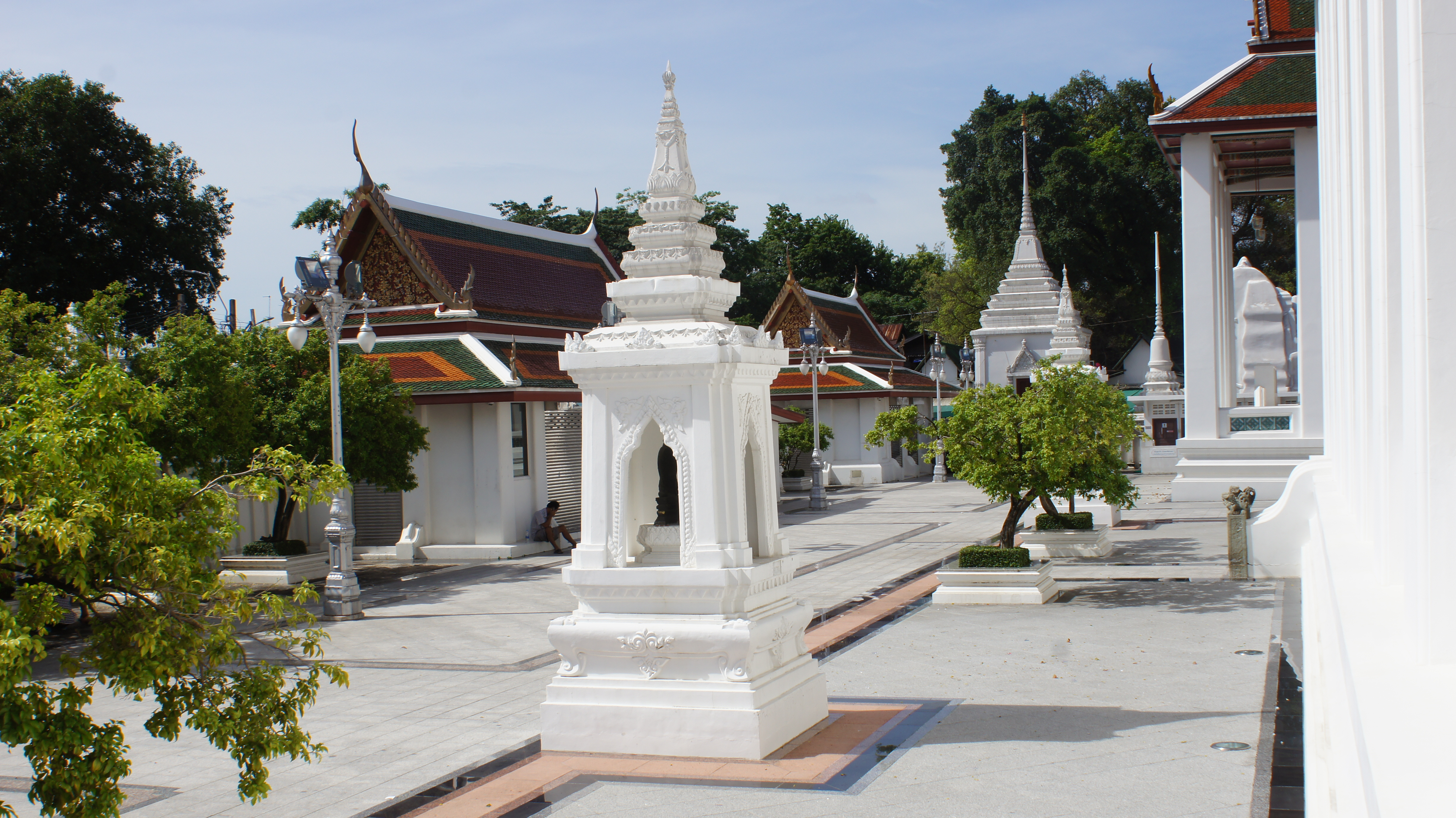

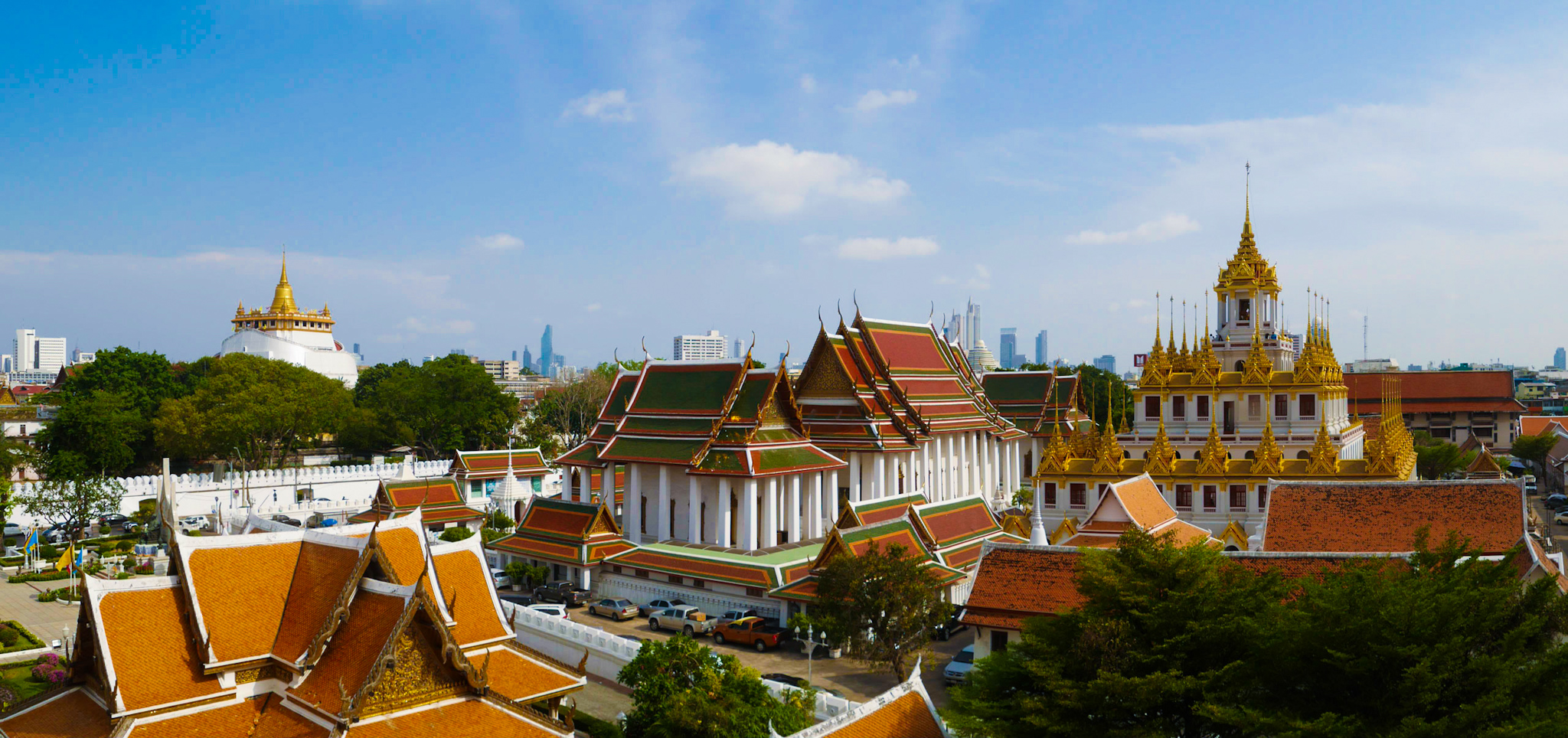
