= Sri Suriyendra =

Born: 21 September 1767; died:18 October 1836

Sri Suriyendra; ศรีสุริเยนทรา
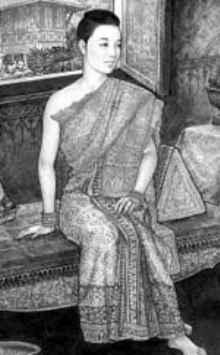
- Queen Sri Suriyendra in 1820

Consort of the Siamese monarch
- Tenure: 7 September 1809 – 21 July 1824
- Born: Princess Bunrot; 21 September 1767; Amphawa, Thonburi
- Died: 18 October 1836 (aged 69); Bangkok, Siam
- Spouse: Phutthaloetla Naphalai (Rama II)
- Issue: Ratchakuman; Mongkut (Rama IV); Chutamani
Posthumous name
- Krom Somdet Phra Sri Suriyendra Mat; (granted by Rama III); Somdet Phra Sri Suriyendra Boromma Rajini; (granted by Rama VI)
- Dynasty: Chakri (by marriage)
- Father: Ngoen Saetan
- Mother: Princess Kaeo
- Religion: Theravada Buddhism

Sri Suriyendra (Note: Thai: ศรีสุริเยนทรา, RTGS: Si Suriyenthra, Śrī Suriyendrā) (1767–1836) was the royal consort and later became queen consort of King Phutthaloetla Naphalai, who was her cousin, and mother of Mongkut and Pinklao. She was later named, upon the coronation of her son Mongkut, as Krom Somdet Phra Sri Suriyendramat.

Princess Bunrot (Note: บุญรอด) was a daughter of Princess Sri Sudarak (เจ้าฟ้ากรมพระศรีสุดารักษ์) (sister of Phutthayotfa Chulalok) and her Chinese husband Ngoen Saetan (เงิน แซ่ตัน). Princess Bunrot lived with her mother in the Grand Palace and grew up with her maternal female cousins, the daughters of Phutthayotfa Chulalok.

Princess Bunrot had an affair with her cousin, Prince Itsarasunthon, son and heir apparent to King Phutthayotfa Chulalok. In 1801, the King discovered the princess' four-month pregnancy and banished her from the Grand Palace to live with her brother Prince Thepharirak. Prince Itsarasunthon begged his father to no avail to return the princess to the palace. The couple eventually settled at the Old Palace (Thonburi Palace) and Princess Bunrot became the prince's consort. The baby died however, shortly after birth. With Prince Itsarasunthon (the future Phutthaloetla Naphalai), she bore three sons:

- The first, born in 1801, died shortly after birth;
- Prince Mongkut, or later King Mongkut (or King Rama IV), born in 1804;
- Prince Chutamani, or later King Pinklao, born in 1808.

Following Prince Itsarasunthon's coronation as Phutthaloetla Naphalai, Princess Bunrot was raised to the rank of queen. She was not the only wife since the Siamese monarchs were allowed have many consorts in accordance with tradition. Sri Suriyendra shared her husband with Princess Consort Kunthon and Princess Riam (Mother of King Nangklao (or King Rama III)) and a number of the king's concubines.

Her son, Prince Mongkut became a monk in 1824, the same year that Phutthaloetla Naphalai died. It was her son Mongkut who was to be crowned according to tradition. However, the nobility decided to offer the crown to Prince Tub, who became King Nangklao (Rama III) (the Prince was a son of concubine, but had been extremely experienced in government). Mongkut then remained a monk to avoid court intrigues.

Sri Suriyendra then left the Grand Palace for the Old Palace (Wang Derm) to live with her son Prince Isaret (previously Prince Chutamani). She stayed there until her death on 18 October 1836, and she did not live to see her son Mongkut crowned.

== Notes ==
Sri Suriyendra House of Chakri Born: 1767 Died: 1836
Thai royalty
Preceded by Amarindra	Consort of the Siamese monarch 1809–1824	Vacant Title next held by Somanass as queen consort
Honorary titles
Preceded by The Princess Narindradevi	Eldest Royal Member of the Chakri Dynasty; 1827–1836	Succeeded by Princess Mother Sri Sulalai
