= Rama III =

King of Siam from 1824 to 1851

Nangklao; นั่งเกล้า
- King of Ayutthaya (Note: Thai monarchs continued to refer to themselves as Kings of Ayutthaya long after the city's fall, until the reign of Mongkut, who adopted the title King of Siam in official treaties.); King Rama III
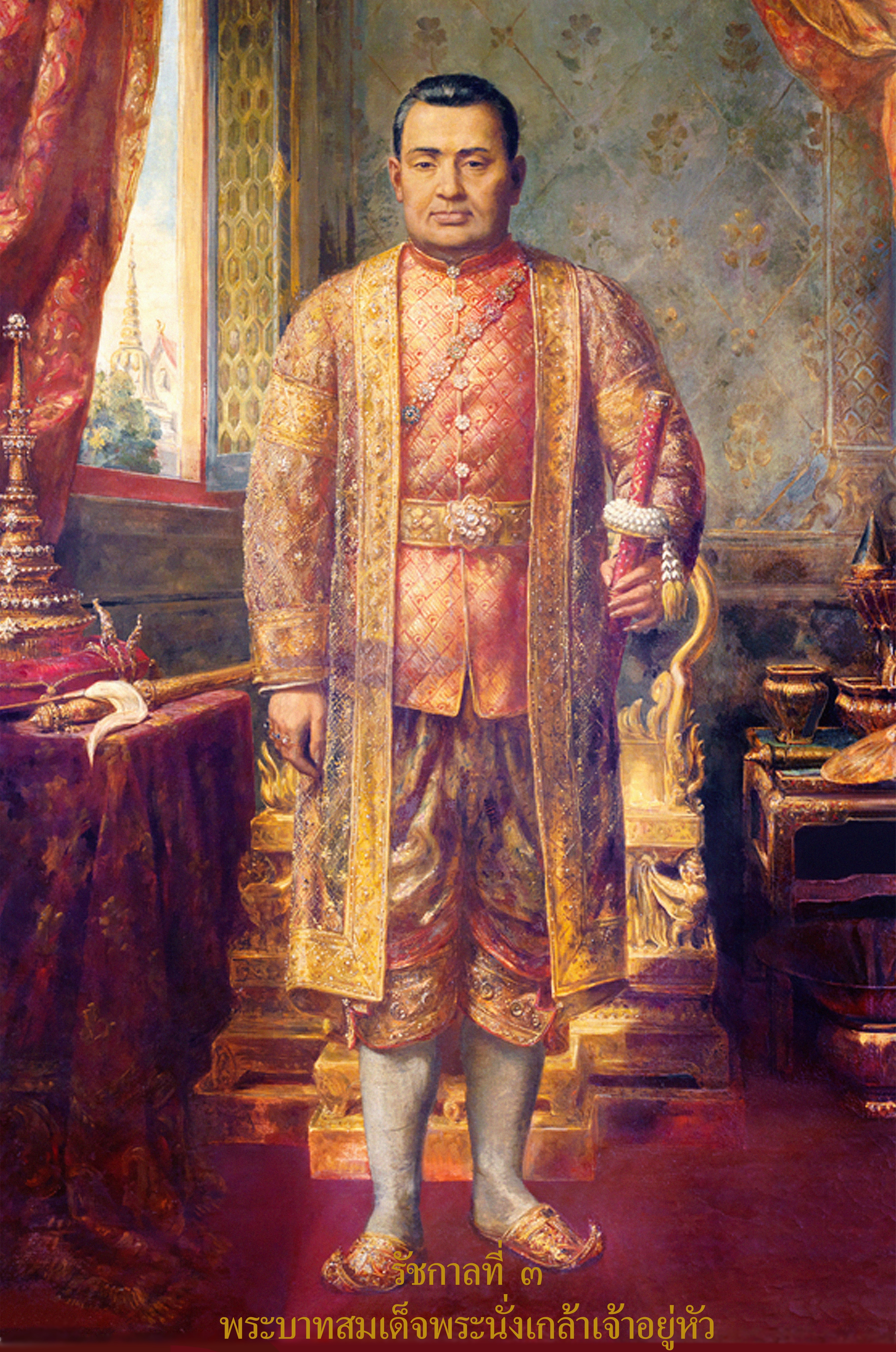
- Portrait at the Grand Palace, Bangkok

King of Rattanakosin
- Reign: 21 July 1824 – 2 April 1851
- Coronation: 1 August 1824
- Predecessor: Phutthaloetla Naphalai (Rama II)
- Successor: Mongkut (Rama IV)
- Viceroy: Sakdiphonlasep (1824–1832)
- Born: Thap (Chetsadabodin); 31 March 1788; Thonburi, Siam
- Died: 2 April 1851 (aged 63); Bangkok, Siam
- Spouses: Various consorts
- Issue: 51 sons and daughters
- Dynasty: Chakri
- Father: Phutthaloetla Naphalai (Rama II)
- Mother: Sri Sulalai
- Religion: Theravada Buddhism
- Seal

Nangklao (Note: Thai: นั่งเกล้า) (born Thap (Note: also Tub, Thai: ทับ, lit. 'crush'); 31 March 1788 – 2 April 1851), also known by his posthumous regnal name Rama III, was King of Rattanakosin from 1824 to his death in 1851. During his reign, he initiated the country's first cautious engagements with the West. Siam's territory also reached its greatest extent during this period.

Nangklao was the eldest surviving son of King Rama II. His mother Sri Sulalai was one of Rama II's secondary wives. Nangklao was likely designated as heir by his father. His accession was uncontested and smoothly confirmed by the grand council. Foreign observers, however, falsely perceived him as having usurped the prior claim of his younger half-brother Prince Mongkut, who was born to Queen Sri Suriyendra and thus "legitimate" according to Western customs. Under the old concept of Thai monarchy, however, a proper king must emulate Maha Sammata in that he must be "elected by the people." Ironically, Mongkut may have later contributed to this misconception, when he feared that his own accession might be perceived by foreign observers as a usurpation.

During Nangklao's reign, the crown strengthened the tax-farming system, which became a major and more reliable source of revenue for the kingdom. The Burney Treaty (1826) further liberalized foreign trade and reduced the royal warehouse monopoly, generating substantial income for the state. For his contributions to trade and economic development, he is regarded as "the father of Thai commerce". In military affairs, Siam consolidated its regional dominance by suppressing the Laotian Rebellion (1826–1828, in what is now the Isan region) and by prevailing in the Siamese–Vietnamese War (1831–34) and the subsequent campaign in Cambodia (1841–1845).

== Early life ==
Nangklao was born as Prince Thap in 1788 to Prince Itsarasunthon and one of his royal wives, Chao Chom Manda Riam, who came from a Muslim noble family from the south. Riam also birthed two siblings for Prince Thap who both died in the same year, Pom (1790–93) and Noo Dam (1792–93). Following Itsarasunthon's coronation (posthumously known as Phutthaloetla Naphalai, or Rama II) in 1809, Prince Kshatriyanuchit (Mom Men), a surviving son of Taksin, revolted as pretender to the throne. Prince Thap was assigned to suppress the rebellion, which he did. Praised by his father for his competence, Prince Thap was given the Sanskrit-derived title Chetsadabodin, raised to the bureaucratic rank of Kromma Muen, and served his father as Kromma Tha (minister of trade and foreign affairs). He received the sobriquet "Chao Sua" (Note: Thai: เจ้าสัว, literally "merchant magnate"; a Thai term of Chinese origin referring to a wealthy merchant or financier.), bestowed by his father in recognition of his commercial acumen. As Kromma Tha, he developed proficiency in foreign trade, and developed an affection for Chinese goods and culture. Temples he later had constructed were characterized by Chinese influence. After a private audience in 1822, Crawfurd wrote of the Prince Krom-chiat that, "he seemed certainly to maintain the character assigned to him in public estimation, of being the most intelligent of all the princes and chiefs of the Siamese Court." The Portuguese Consul stated that the Prince had offered him a large sum of money, if he would translate from the French into the Portuguese language a history of the wars of Napoleon, for the purpose of being rendered into Siamese through the Christian interpreters.

== Succession ==
Rattanakosin during Rama III's reign

As the prince administered trade affairs, his half-brother Prince Mongkut pursued the way of religion, becoming a monk in 1824. In that year, Phutthaloetla Naphalai died suddenly without having named a successor to viceroy Maha Senanurak, who had died 16 July 1817. According to the traditions of royal succession, the viceroy or uparaja was heir presumptive. If there were none, then an ad hoc senabodi consisting of senior officials present at the death of a king, would elect a successor. Foreign observers accustomed to the concept of an heir apparent expected Prince Mongkut, as a son of the queen, to ascend to the throne. However, the assembled Senabodi considered Prince Chetsadabodin a more competent choice as he had served the king in Kromma Tha for years. Support came strongly from high-ranking nobility, including Chao Phraya Abhay Pudhorn, the Samuha Nayok, and Dis Bunnag then Minister of Kromma Tha, and other Bunnag family members.

Chetsadabodin accepted the throne and was crowned in 1824. He raised his mother Riam to Princess Mother Sri Sulalai. He appointed his uncle, Sakdiphonlasep, viceroy on 21 July 1824 – who predeceased the king 1 May 1832, leading to yet another succession crisis. He did not name his reign, but was posthumously awarded the name Nangklao by Mongkut, who had in the interim remained in ecclesiastic status to avoid the intrigues of royal politics.

== Western contacts ==
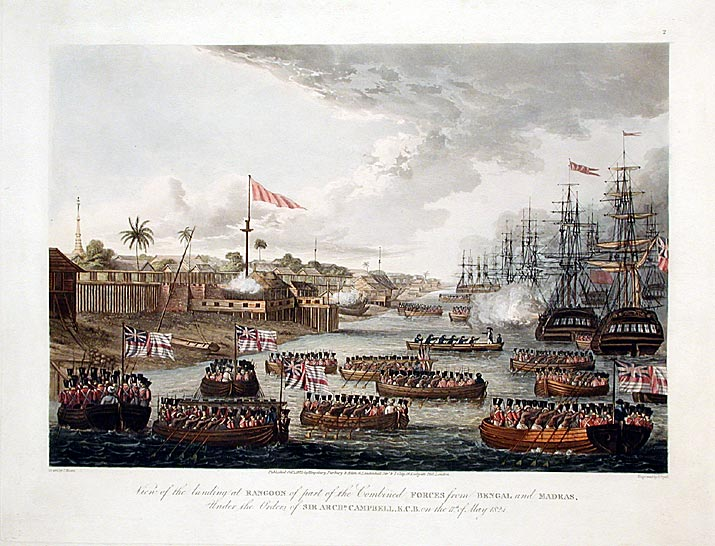
During the First Anglo-Burmese War, Nangklao initially assisted the British during the war

The reign of Nangklao (as he was posthumously known) saw the renewal of Western contacts. In 1822, British East India Company agent John Crawfurd's mission to Siam laid the groundwork for a British request for Siamese support in the First Anglo-Burmese War, which broke out in 1824. Nangklao provided fleets and elephants and sent Siamese armies to participate in the invasion of Burma since the British promised Siam the conquered lands. Phraya Chumporn ordered the forced migration of Mergui (a common practice in Southeast Asia regarding the newly-conquered lands), which had been conquered by the British. The British were frustrated at Phraya Chumporn's actions, and hostilities were heightened. Nangklao ordered the Siamese armies to leave to avoid further conflict.

In 1825, Henry Burney arrived to negotiate peace agreements. The Burney Treaty was the first treaty with the West during the Rattanakosin period. Its purpose was to establish free trade in Siam and to greatly reduce taxation on foreign trading ships. Whether it accomplished these objectives is disputed.

In 1833, US President Andrew Jackson's "special agent" and envoy Edmund Roberts, referring often to Crawfurd's account, concluded the Siamese–American Treaty of Amity and Commerce, signed at the Royal City of Sia-Yut'hia (Bangkok) on 20 March, the last of the fourth month of the year 1194 CS (Chula Sakarat). This treaty, with later modifications, is still in force. Dan Beach Bradley, an American physician and prominent Western personality of the time, introduced printing and vaccination.

== Anouvong insurgency ==
Monarchs of the Chakri dynasty
- Phutthayotfa Chulalok (Rama I)
- Phutthaloetla Naphalai (Rama II)
- Nangklao (Rama III)
- Mongkut (Rama IV)
- Chulalongkorn (Rama V)
- Vajiravudh (Rama VI)
- Prajadhipok (Rama VII)
- Ananda Mahidol (Rama VIII)
- Bhumibol Adulyadej (Rama IX)
- Vajiralongkorn (Rama X)

The three Laotian kingdoms (Lan Xang in Vientiane, Luang Prabang, and Champasak) became Siamese tributary states after Chao Phraya Maha Kshatriyaseuk (King Rama I, Nangklao's grandfather) had conquered them in 1778. Anouvong, the son of the king of Vientiene, was taken to Bangkok as a captive. He spent nearly thirty years in Siam and joined the Siamese forces in wars with Burma. In 1805, Anouvong returned to Vientiane to be crowned as the king.

In 1824, Phutthaloetla Naphalai died and, in the following year, Siam was dragged into conflicts with the British Empire. Anouvong saw this as an opportunity to wield his power. In 1825, returning from the funeral of Phutthaloetla Naphalai in Bangkok, Anouvong assembled a large force and went on the offensive. After defeating Bangkok-vassal principalities along the way, Anouvong captured Korat, the main defensive stronghold of Siam in the northeast. He forced the city to be evacuated while marching to Saraburi, on approach to the capital, Bangkok. However, the Korat captives rebelled—said to have been at the instigation of Lady Mo, wife of a ruling noble of Korat—although this claim is countered by many historians who say Mo had no heroic role in the events at Tung Samrit, though a contemporary account did mention her action. As Bangkok gathered counterattacking troops, Anouvong withdrew to return to Vientiane.

Nangklao sent his uncle Maha Sakdi Polsep the Front Palace and Sing Singhaseni (at the time styled Phraya Ratchasuphawadi) to defeat the armies of Anouvong in Isan. Anouvong was defeated and fled to Vietnam. The Siamese captured Vientiane and ordered the evacuation of the city.

In 1827, Nangklao ordered the total destruction of Vientiane. Anouvong returned to Laos with Vietnamese forces. Ratchasuphawadi led the Siamese to fight and the engagements occurred at Nong Khai. Anouvong was defeated again and, after an attempt to flee, was captured. Vientiane was razed, extinguishing her 200 year reign, and ceased to be a kingdom. Anouvong was imprisoned in an iron cage in front of the Suthaisawan Hall and died in 1829.

== Vietnam and Cambodia ==
In 1810, internal conflicts between Cambodian princes forced Ang Im and Ang Duong to flee to Bangkok. Otteyraja of Cambodia turned to Gia Long of Vietnam for support against the opposing princes. However, this was perceived by Siam as treacherous as the two countries had fought for centuries for control of Cambodia.

In 1833, the Lê Văn Khôi revolt against Minh Mạng broke out in Vietnam. Lê Văn Khôi, the rebel leader, sought Siamese aid. Nangklao intended to take this opportunity to install a pro-Siamese monarch on the Cambodian throne.

Phraya Ratchasuphawadi, who had been promoted to Chao Phraya Bodindecha, was ordered to capture Saigon. Dis Bunnag, the Minister of Kromma Tha, commanded a fleet to rendezvous with ground forces at Saigon. The two Cambodian princes, Ang Im and Ang Duong, also joined the expedition. Bodindecha took Udongk and the fleet took Bantey Mas. The fleet proceeded to Saigon but was repelled.

Bodindecha then took Phnom Penh and again invaded Vietnam by land in 1842. In 1845, the Vietnamese recaptured Phnom Penh, but Bodindecha was able to defend Udongk. In 1847, prompted by Emperor Thiệu Trị's treatment of Christian missionaries, French forces invaded Vietnam. A cessation of hostilities with Siam was negotiated. Ang Duong was installed as the Cambodian monarch under the equal patronage of both Siam and Vietnam, thus ending the war.

== Revolt of Kedah ==
In 1837, Krom Somdet Phra Sri Suralai, mother of Nangklao, died. All officials throughout the kingdom went to Bangkok to attend the funeral. At Syburi (Kedah of Malaysia now), without the presence of Siamese governors, a nephew of the Sultan of Kedah then staged a revolt. Nangklao then sent Tat Bunnag down south to subjugate the rebellion quickly in 1838. Tat then suggested an autonomous government for Kedah Sultanate. In 1839, Kedah was divided into four autonomous parts.

== Religious devotion and educational reforms ==
Nangklao was famous for his Buddhist faith. He fed the poor each day after becoming prince, and released animals every monastery day. More than 50 temples were built and repaired in his reign, including the first Chinese style temple at Rajorasa, the highest stupa at Wat Arun, the Golden Mountain at Wat Saket, the metal temple at Wat Ratchanadda, and Chetupol Temple or Wat Pho. Wat Pho is the site of the first university in Thailand. Under his reign, King Rama III was also responsible for the writing of the Chindamanee textbook and also the revision of the Buddhist Canon, the Tipitaka which was to be distributed throughout the kingdom. In addition to that Rama III also allowed monks to use castles as classrooms for the teaching of Buddhist faith.

== Death ==
Nangklao died on 2 April 1851 without having named a successor. He had 51 children including sons, but had raised none of his consorts to the queen. The throne passed to his younger paternal half-brother, Prince Mongkut.

== Legacy ==
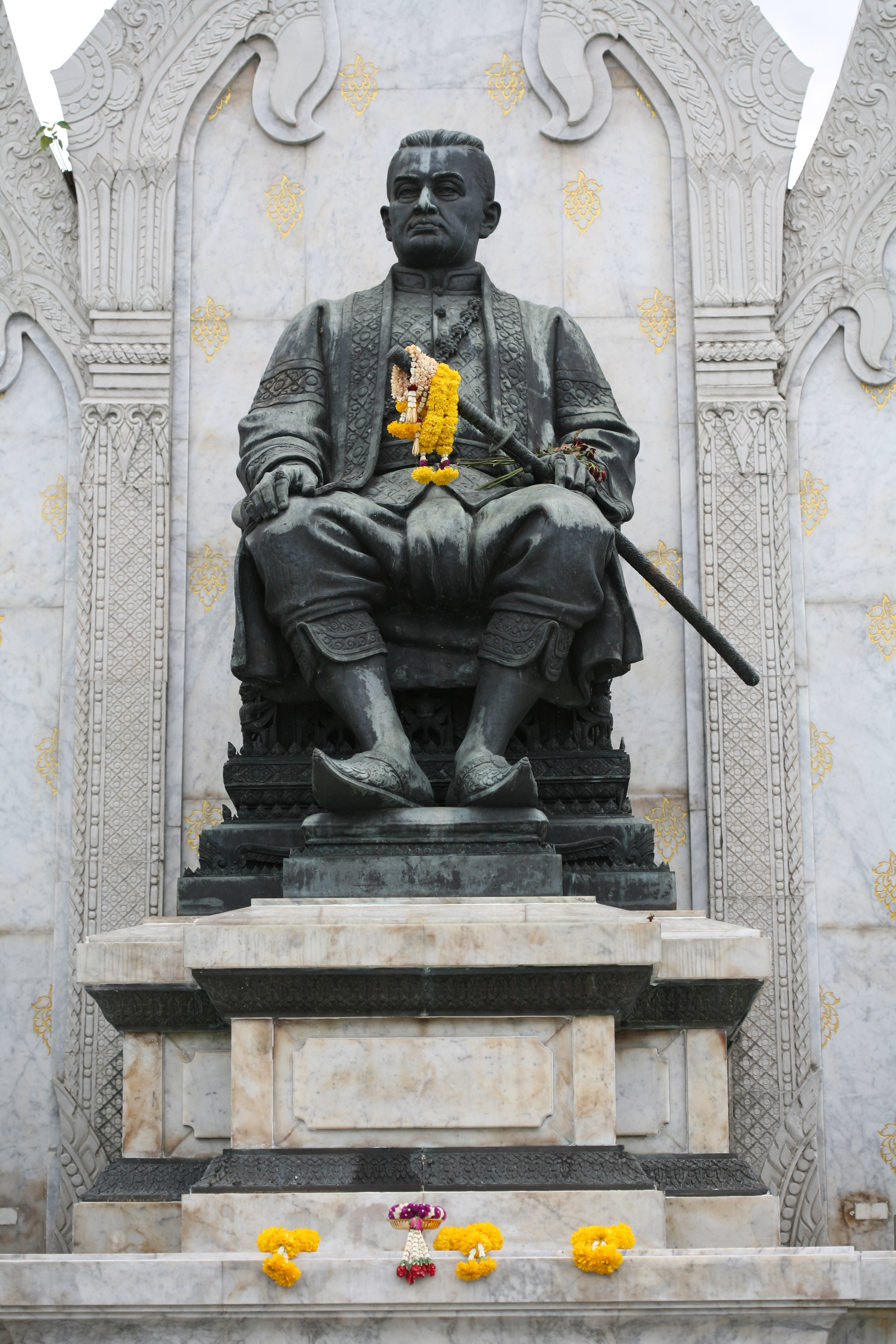
Statue of King Rama III at Wat Ratchanatdaram, Bangkok

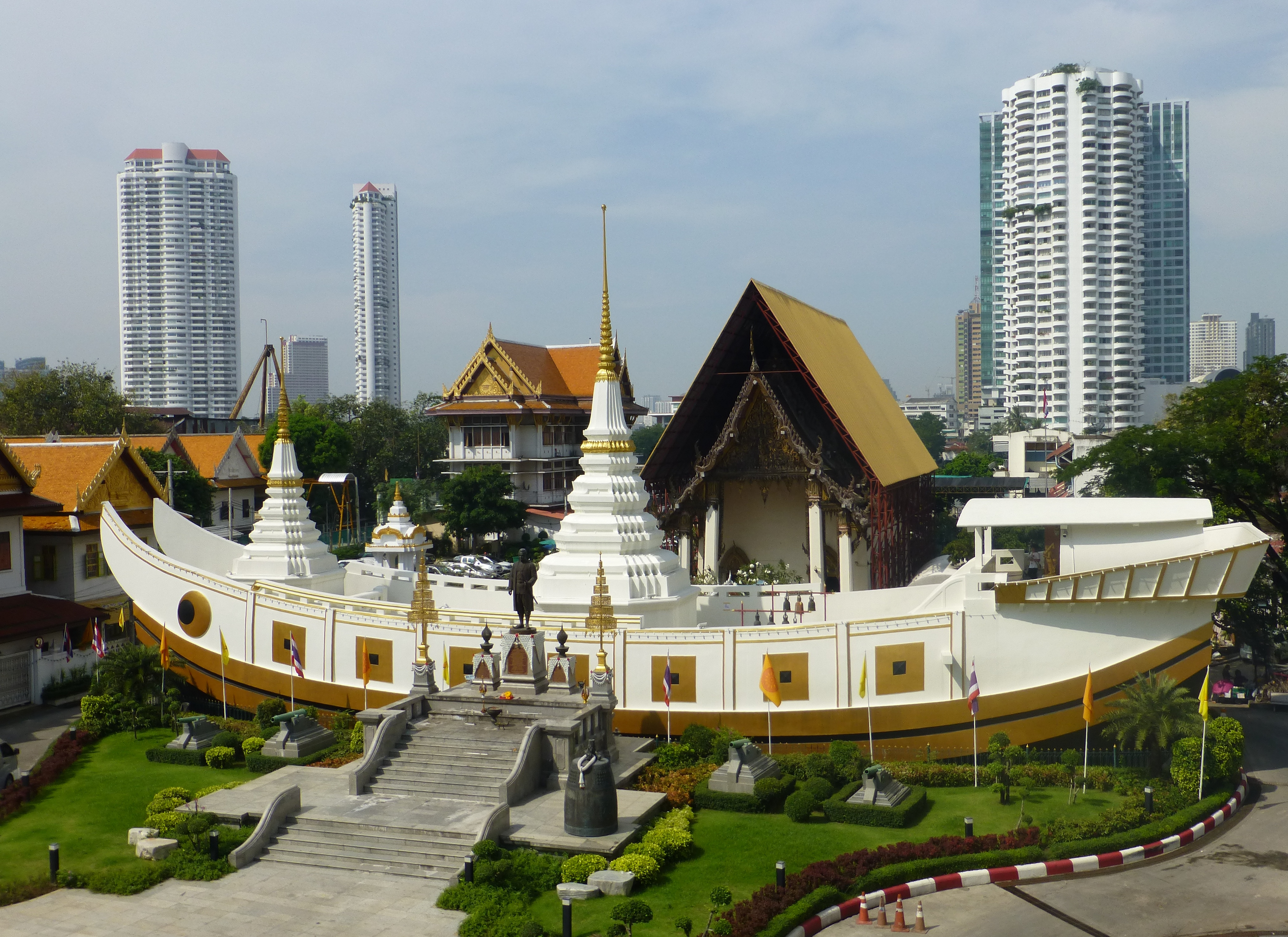
Wat Yannawa was patronised by Nangklao, who ordered the temple enlarged and constructed many new structures within. The temple is shaped like a Chinese junk to commemorate the significance of Chinese commerce and influence in Siam during Nangklao's reign

Nangklao is remembered as a commercially minded monarch whose reign consolidated Siam's early-Rattanakosin economy. He has been commemorated in Thailand as the "father of Thai commerce", the "father of Thai maritime trade", and the "father of Thai traditional medicine". Administratively and fiscally, his promotion of tax-farming and robust China-linked exchange helped secure steady crown revenues in the 1820s–1840s.

Culturally, Nangklao left a lasting built heritage in Bangkok, patronising temple construction and a distinct Sino-Thai aesthetic. Notable works include Wat Ratchanatdaram and the Loha Prasat, commissioned during his reign. His guidance to his successor—preserved in later accounts—stressed frugality, concord with the sangha, and vigilance in foreign affairs, themes that shaped the early reign of Mongkut (Rama IV).

Commemoration of his reign continues in modern Thailand; 31 March is observed annually as "King Nangklao Memorial Day".

=== Commemoration ===
- Thai baht 15th Series banknotes issued to draw attention to deeds of Chakri Dynasty monarchs in agriculture, science, religion and finance, depicted King Rama III on the reverse of the 500 baht banknote issued 3 August 2001, with a partial quotation of his deathbed statement below a Chinese sailing ship.
- A statue of Rama III was dedicated in the front of Wat Ratchanatdaram.
- Phra Nang Klao Hospital is a hospital in Nonthaburi Province bearing his name.
- Phra Nang Klao Bridge is a bridge across the Chao Phraya River in Nonthaburi Province bearing his name, with the Phra Nang Klao Bridge MRT station.
- Maha Chesadabodindranusorn Bridge is a bridge across the Chao Phraya River in Nonthaburi Province bearing his title.

== Ancestry ==
Ancestors of Rama III

8. Thongdi Chakri, Chaophraya Chakri Sri Ongkharak
4. King Phutthayotfa Chulalok, Rama I of Rattanakosin
9. Yok
2. King Phutthaloetla Naphalai, Rama II of Rattanakosin
10. Thong Na Bangxang
5. Nak Na Bangxang
11. San, Princess Rupsirisobhak Mahanagnari
1. King Nangklao, Rama III of Rattanakosin
6. Bunchan, Phraya Nanthaburi Sri Maha-uthayan
3. Lady Riam
14. Wang, Phraya Ratchawangsan
7. Lady Pheng
15. Chu

== See also ==
- List of people with the most children

== Notes ==
Nangklao (Rama III) House of Chakri Born: 31 March 1788 Died: 2 April 1851
Regnal titles
Preceded by Phutthaloetla Naphalai	King of Rattanakosin; 21 July 1824 – 2 April 1851	Succeeded by Mongkut
