= Rama II =

King of Siam from 1809 to 1824

Phutthaloetla Naphalai; พุทธเลิศหล้านภาลัย
- King of Ayutthaya (Note: Thai monarchs continued to refer to themselves as Kings of Ayutthaya long after the city's fall, until the reign of Mongkut, who adopted the title King of Siam in official treaties.); King Rama II
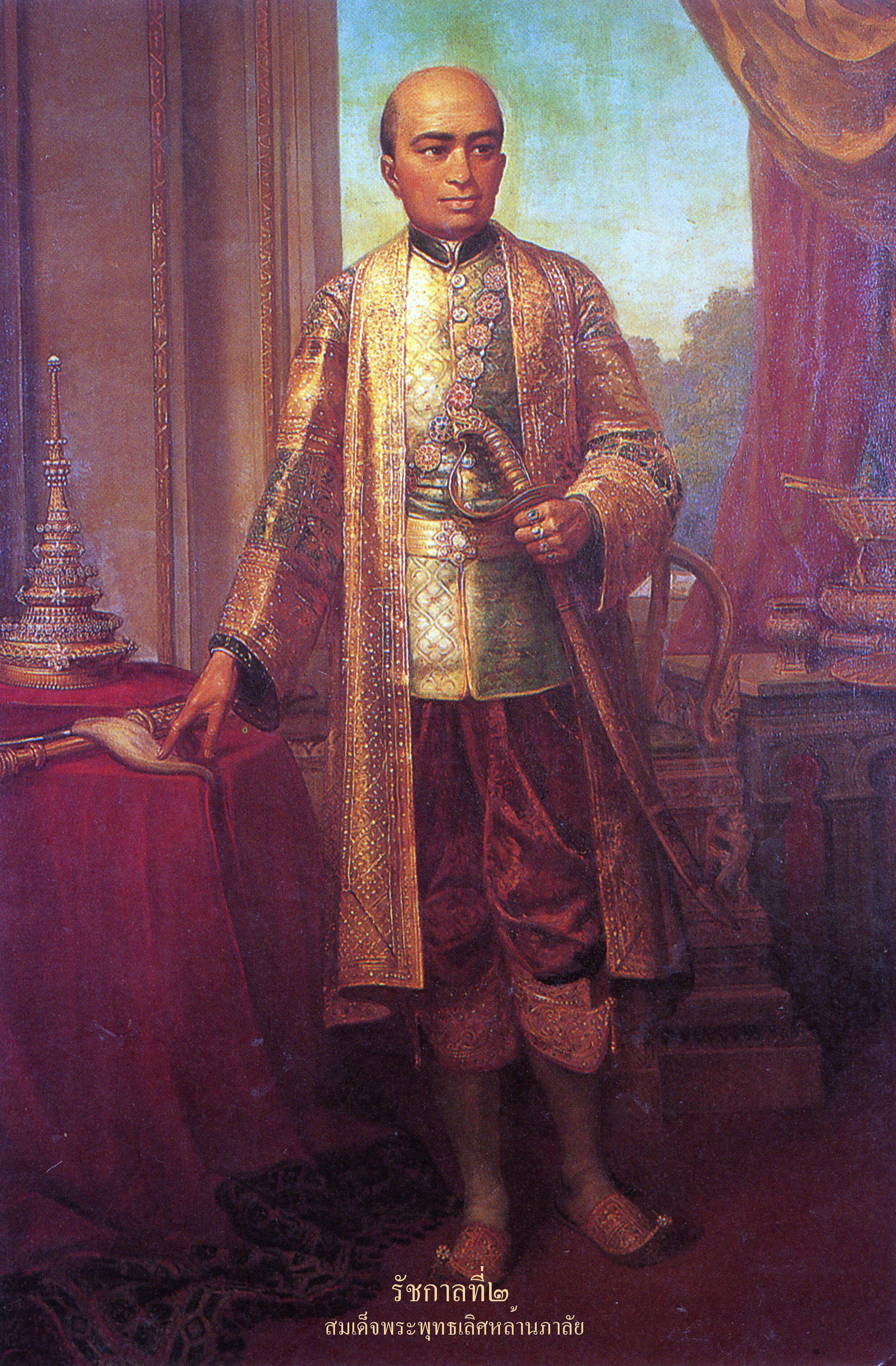
- Portrait at the Grand Palace, Bangkok

King of Rattanakosin
- Reign: 7 September 1809 – 21 July 1824
- Coronation: 17 September 1809
- Predecessor: Phutthayotfa Chulalok (Rama I)
- Successor: Nangklao (Rama III)
- Viceroy: Maha Senanurak (1809–1817)

Viceroy of Rattanakosin
- Tenure: 1808 – 7 September 1809
- Appointer: Phutthayotfa Chulalok (Rama I)
- Predecessor: Maha Sura Singhanat
- Successor: Maha Senanurak
- Born: Chim (Itsarasunthon); 24 February 1767; Amphawa, Ayutthaya
- Died: 21 July 1824 (aged 57); Bangkok, Siam
- Spouses: Sri Suriyendra (Bunrot); Kunthon Thipphayawadi; Sri Sulalai (Riam); and 55 concubines
- Issue: 34 sons and 39 daughters, including: Nangklao (Rama III); Mongkut (Rama IV); Wongsa Dhiraj Snid (Nuam); Pinklao (Chutamani)
- Dynasty: Chakri
- Father: Phutthayotfa Chulalok (Rama I)
- Mother: Amarindra
- Religion: Theravada Buddhism
- Seal

Monarchs of the Chakri dynasty
- Phutthayotfa Chulalok (Rama I)
- Phutthaloetla Naphalai (Rama II)
- Nangklao (Rama III)
- Mongkut (Rama IV)
- Chulalongkorn (Rama V)
- Vajiravudh (Rama VI)
- Prajadhipok (Rama VII)
- Ananda Mahidol (Rama VIII)
- Bhumibol Adulyadej (Rama IX)
- Vajiralongkorn (Rama X)

Phutthaloetla Naphalai (Note: Thai: พุทธเลิศหล้านภาลัย) (born Chim (Note: Thai: ฉิม); 24 February 1767 or 1768 – 21 July 1824), also known by his regnal name Rama II, was the second King of Rattanakosin from the Chakri dynasty, ruling from 1809 to 1824. In 1809, as Prince Itsarasunthon, he succeeded his father Rama I, the founder of the Chakri dynasty, to become Loetlanaphalai, King of Siam. His reign was largely peaceful, devoid of major conflicts. His reign was known as the "Golden Age of Rattanakosin Literature" as Loetlanaphalai was patron to a number of poets in his court, and the King himself was a renowned poet and artist. The most notable poet in his employ was the illustrious Sunthorn Phu, the author of Phra Aphai Mani. The rapid growth of the number of his descendants was outstanding: he is believed to have had over 240 grandchildren.

== Early life ==
Chim was born in 1767 during the Ayutthaya Kingdom in Amphawa District, Samut Songkram. He was a son of Luang Yokkrabat of Ratchaburi and Nak of Samut Sakorn, as his father and mother were then known. They would later become King Rama I and Queen Amarindra, respectively.

In 1767, Ayutthaya fell to Konbaung Burmese invaders. His father, Phraya Ratchaburi, joined Taksin's forces to recapture the city. Under King Taksin, Chim's father rose rapidly to high rank as a military leader and was assigned with the campaigns to subjugate Laos and Cambodia. In 1782, his father crowned himself King of Siam (later named Rama I) and Chim himself was raised to the title of Prince Itsarasunthon of Siam.

Itsarasunthon with his concubine Riam (later elevated to Princess Mother Sri Sulalai by her own son), fathered Prince Thap (ทับ – later Rama III) in 1787. Prince Itsarasunthon then had a secret affair with his own cousin, Princess Bunrot. In 1801, Rama I then found out that Princess Bunrod had been pregnant for four months and banished her out of the palace to live with her brother. Itsarasunthon, however begged his father to forgive him and the princess was reinstated and became his consort through the negotiation by concubine Khamwaen. Unfortunately, the baby died just after its birth. With Princess Bunrot, Itsarasunthon also fathered Mongkut (1804) and Pinklao (1808). His other concubine, namely Prang Yai, gave birth to Prince Wongsa Dhiraj Snid (Nuam) in 1808.

He also married his agnatic half sister, Princess Kunthon Thipphayawadi. They had three sons: Prince Abhorn (1816), Prince Klang (1819), and Prince Piu (1822). Later, Prince Klang would be known as Prince Mahamala. He was granted the title of Krom Khun Bumraap Porapuksa, the 4th level of Krom ranks by Mongkut then elevated to Krom Phraya by Chulalongkorn.

Prince Itsarasunthon was appointed to the Front Palace as Lord of the Front Palace or Uparaja in 1807 to succeed his uncle Maha Sura Singhanat who had died in 1803, though he continued to stay at the Thonburi Palace. The King had 83 children. Among his many other children was Prince Wongsa Dhiraj Snid (born Prince Nuam), who was a royal physician for many years as well as a field commander and diplomat.

== Ascension ==
As the eldest surviving legitimate son of Rama I, Prince Itsarasunthon succeeded to the throne when Buddha Yotfa Chulaloke died in 1809. No royal naming system was established at the time Rama II was crowned. He was later named by his son Nangklao as Loetlasulalai but changed to Loetlanaphalai by his other son Mongkut and by the Rama convention, called Rama II. His consort, Princess Bunrod, was raised to Queen Sri Suriyendra.

As soon as Loetlanaphalai ascended the throne, Prince Kshatranichit, the surviving son of Taksin, rebelled as pretender to the throne. Loetlanaphalai's son, Prince Thap, effectively crushed the rebellion, proving himself to be competent, thus gaining his father's favor. Thap was raised to Kromma Muen, given the Sanskrit-derived name Chetsadabodin, and made Minister of Foreign Affairs.

=== Countering the last major Burmese invasions ===
The Konbaung king Bodawpaya, seeing that Rama I was dead, marched an army into Chumphon and conquered Thalang (Phuket City) in the same year. Loetlanaphalai sent his brother Maha Senanurak the Front Palace to recapture Thalang, which had been razed to the ground. This "Thalang campaign" was the last invasion by the Burmese into Thai territory.

In 1820, fearing an imminent attack by the Burmese on Siam, Rama II ordered his staff to collect all information in regards to potential Burmese invading routes into Siam.

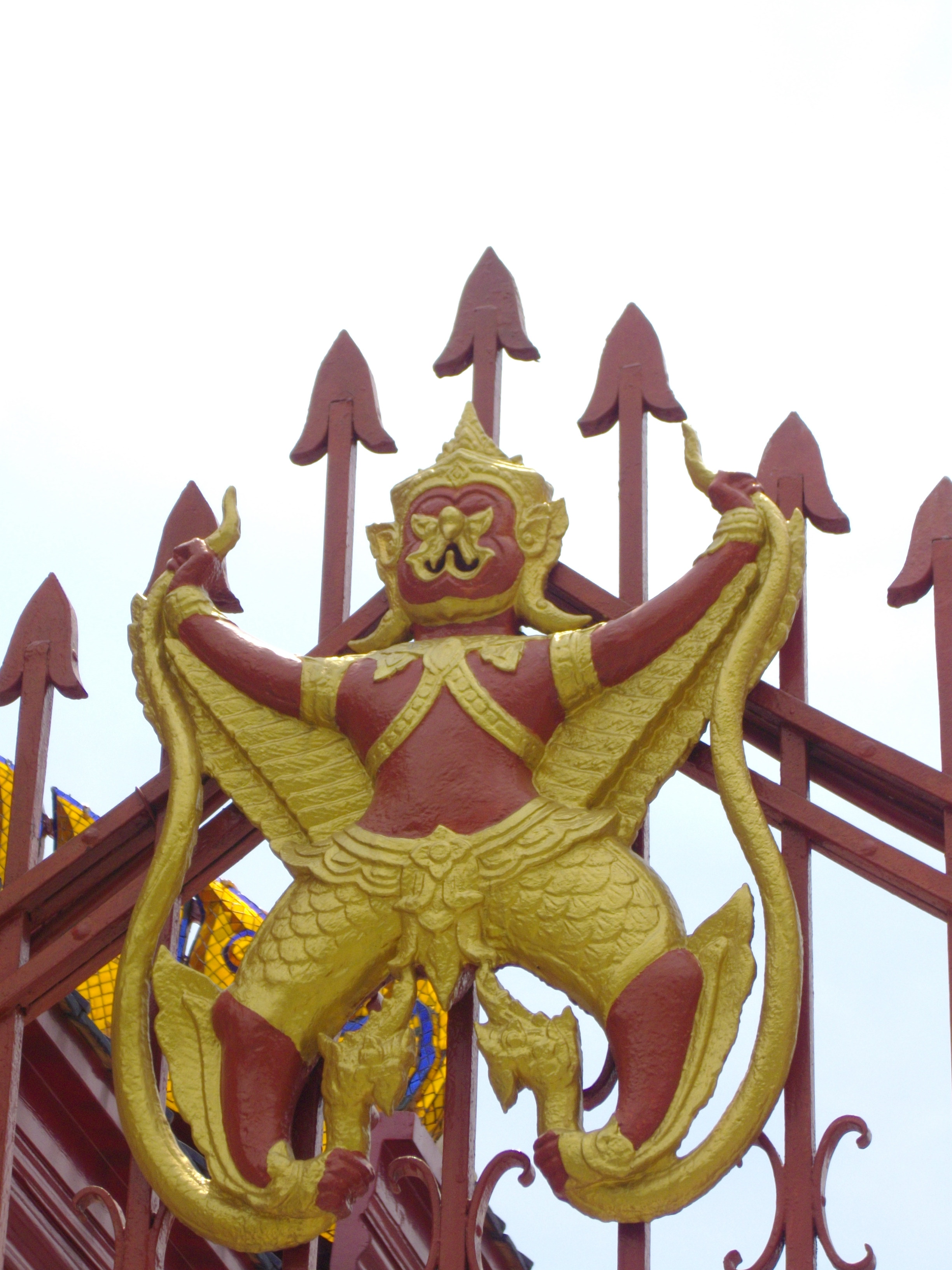
Privy seal of King Rama II, a garuda holding nāgas (Wat Arun, Bangkok)

Rattanakosin during Rama II's reign

== Culture and literature ==
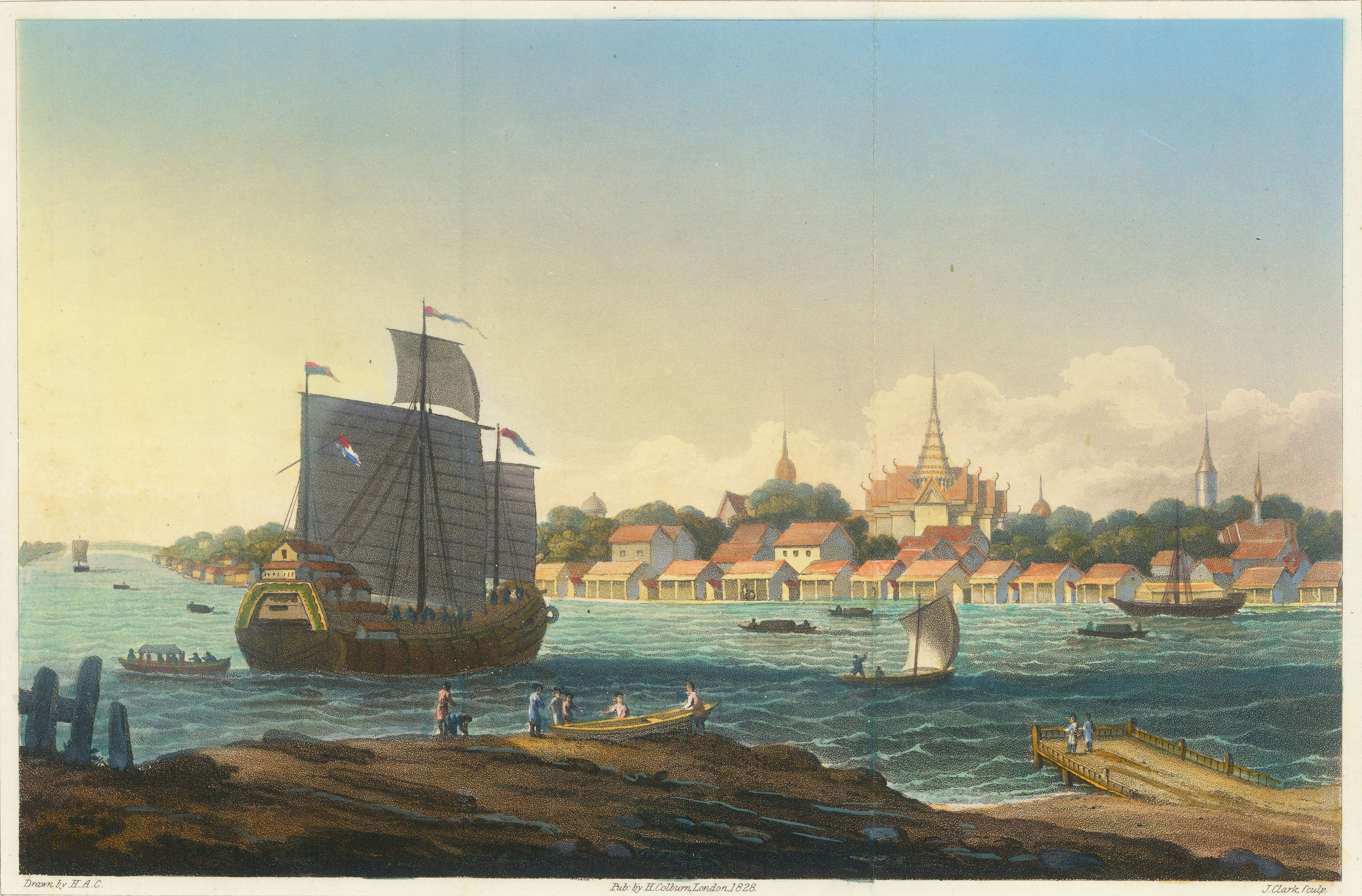
View of the city of Bangkok in 1828

It was said that during Rama II's reign, if one could write a refined piece of poetry, then one would be able to become a royal favorite, as Loetlanaphalai himself was a poet. The reign was a cultural renaissance after the massive wars that plagued the First Reign; particularly in the fields of arts and literature. Poets employed by Rama II included Sunthorn Phu the drunken writer (Phra Aphai Mani) and Narin Dhibet (Nirat Narin). His sons, Jessadabodindra and Paramanuchitchinorot, were encouraged to excel in poetry. Poramanuchit later became a Sangharaj (Buddhist hierophant) and was well known for his religious works.

Rama II's reign saw the reconstruction of Thai culture and royal traditions. In 1811, the grand royal funeral was held for King Rama I. In the same year, a cholera epidemic broke out in Bangkok. Loetlanaphalai ordered Apat Pinat or sickness-repelling ceremonies to be performed. He also established the education and the examination system of Buddhism by dividing it into nine levels. In 1817, the Vesak festival was restored.

== Foreign relations ==
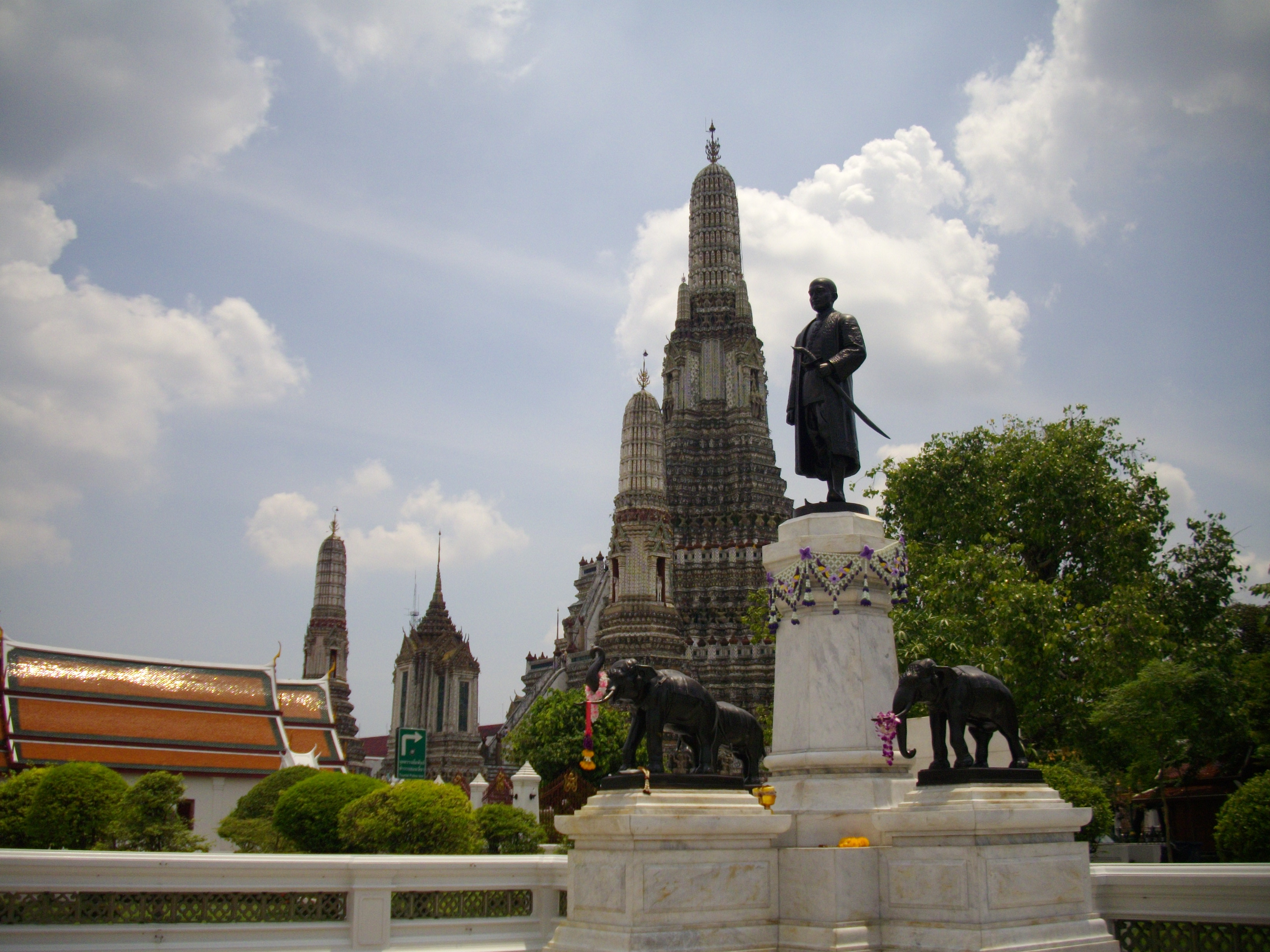
Statue of King Rama II at Wat Arun

Since the Siamese revolution of 1688, Western presence had been reduced to a small scale as the Thai Kings ceased to encourage foreign influence. This, coupled with the Napoleonic Wars, meant there was little contact between Thailand and foreigners.

However, the wars caused many subsequent changes, which were observed in Southeast Asia. The British interest in Malaya increased as their trade with China increased. The Sultan of Kedah, Abdullah Mukarram Shah, a Siamese vassal, gave Penang off to the British without consulting Siam in 1786, followed by the British acquisition of Seberang Perai. Soon the British replaced the Dutch as the dominating naval power south of Siam.

In 1810, the first Rattanakosin-to-China mission was sent to the Jiaqing Emperor.

The mission of the Portuguese governor of Macau in 1818 was the first formal Western contact in Siam since the Ayutthaya times. The British founded Singapore in 1819 and Jaslis, a missionary from Yangon, introduced the printing press in the same year. The Portuguese established the first western consulate in 1820. The first renewed formal British visit was made by John Crawfurd in 1822.

== Death and succession ==
In July 1824, he died "very suddenly". Contemporary accounts attributed his death to strangury, but there were persistent rumours that he had been poisoned. According to the succession rule then theoretically in force, the throne would have passed to the son of Queen Sri Suriyendra, Prince Mongkut; however, his elder half-brother Chetsadabodin succeeded instead on the same day. Though only the son of a concubine, he had served their father in putting down a revolt and then as Kromma Tha (Ministry of Trade and Foreign Relations). The elder brother's experience counted for more than the theoretical claim of the much younger and inexperienced Mongkut, who nevertheless later succeeded his elder brother. Mongkut sired many sons but raised none of their mothers to the rank of queen, so technically none of his sons had a superior claim to the throne over their half-uncle, whose mother was Rama II's principal consort.

== In popular culture ==
He was portrayed as a character in Thai television drama stories namely Khuotho (ขรัวโต อมตะเถระกรุงรัตนโกสินทร์) Portrayed by Ratthi Vorarojyothin.

== Ancestry ==
Ancestors of Rama II

8. Thongkham Chakri, Phraya Rajanikul
4. Thongdi Chakri, Chaophraya Chakri Sri Ongkharak
2. King Phutthayotfa Chulalok, Rama I of Rattanakosin
5. Yok
1. King Phutthaloetla Naphalai, Rama II of Rattanakosin
12. Phorn Na Bangxang
6. Thong Na Bangxang
13. Chi
3. Nak Na Bangxang
7. San, Princess Rupsirisobhak Mahanagnari
15. Thi

== See also ==
- List of people with the most children

Phutthaloetla Naphalai (Rama II) House of Chakri Born: 24 February 1767 Died: 21 July 1824
Regnal titles
Preceded by Phutthayotfa Chulalok	King of Rattanakosin; 7 September 1809 – 21 July 1824	Succeeded by Nangklao
Vacant Title last held by Maha Sura Singhanat	Viceroy of Rattanakosin; 1808 – 7 September 1809	Succeeded by Maha Senanurak
