= Ngao of Vientiane =

Chao Raxavong Ngao
- Raxavong of Vientiane
- Born: 1802; Vientiane
- Died: ? Mahaxay?
- Father: Chao Anouvong

Chao Raxavong Ngao (also spelled Ngau or Ngaow, Thai: เจ้าราชวงศ์ (เหง้า), born 1802) was a Laotian prince. He was the third most important person of Vientiane, just after his uncle, the oupahat Tissa. In Vietnamese records, he was called Hạt Xà Bồng (曷蛇芃).

Ngao was the second son of Chao Anouvong. In his youth, he served as a political hostage in Bangkok. In 1826, he was ordered to commanded a Lao menial labor corps to dig canals and fell trees. They were ill-treated by Siamese, which became one of the principal reasons for Anouvong's revolt against Siamese.

In Lao rebellion, Ngao was the commander-in-chief of Vientiane army. He led one of three Laotian armies to fight against Siamese. His army marched further to Saraburi to repatriate the Lao families who had been forcibly relocated there fifty years before. However, Siam quickly organized a massive counterstrike, Ngao had to withdraw to Nong Bua Lamphu. Finally, Nong Bua Lamphu fell to Siamese, he fled back to Vientiane. After the first sack of Vientiane, he accompanied Anouvong to Nghệ An in Vietnam in 1827. He returned with his father in the next year. His army was crushed by Siamese in Bok Wan village, Nong Khai on 18 October 1828. Ngao was wounded, but never captured. He fled to Mahaxay and continued fighting against Siamese. His end was unknown; various tales of lore by Lao, Siamese and French sources claimed that he survived for many years, raised a family and left descendants.

== See also ==
- Lao rebellion (1826–1828)
