= Anouvong =

Last monarch of the Kingdom of Vientiane

Chao Anouvong ເຈົ້າອານຸວົງສ໌ เจ้าอนุวงศ์
- Chao Anouvong
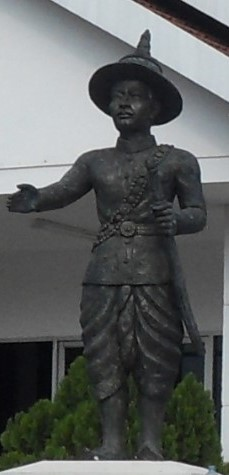

King of Vientiane
- Reign: 7 February 1805 – 12 November 1828
- Predecessor: Inthavong
- Successor: annexed by Siam
- Vice King: Khi Menh (1805–1826); Tissa (1826–1827)

Vice King of Vientiane
- Reign: 2 February 1795 – 7 February 1805
- Predecessor: Inthavong
- Successor: Khi Menh
- King: Inthavong
- Born: 1767; Vientiane, Lan Xang
- Died: 12 November 1828 (aged 60–61); Bangkok, Siam
Names
- Somdet Paramanadha Parama Bupati Somdet Brhat Pen Chao Singhadhamuraja, Somdet Brhat Parama Bupati Brhat Maha Kashatriya Khatiya Adipati Jayasethha Jatikasuriya Varman, Angga Penh Brhat Yulumanaya Maha Negara Chandrapuri Sri Sadhana Kanayudha Visudhirattana Rajadhanapuri Rama Lan Chang Krum Klao
Regnal name
- Xaiya Setthathirath V
- Father: Ong Boun
- Mother: Phranang Kamphong

Chao Anouvong (Lao: ເຈົ້າອານຸວົງສ໌; Thai: เจ้าอนุวงศ์; RTGS: Chao Anuwong), or regnal name Xaiya Setthathirath V (Lao: ໄຊຍະເສດຖາທິຣາຊທີ່ຫ້າ; Thai: ไชยเชษฐาธิราชที่ห้า; RTGS: Chaiya Chetthathirat Thi Ha), (1767 – 1829), led the Lao rebellion (1826–28) against Siam as the last monarch of the Kingdom of Vientiane. Anouvong succeeded the throne in 1805 upon the death of his brother, Chao Inthavong (Lao: ເຈົ້າອິນທະວົງສ໌; เจ้าอินทวงศ์), Xaiya Setthathirath IV, who had succeeded their father, Ong Bun or Phrachao Siribounyasan (Lao: ພຣະເຈົ້າສິຣິບຸນຍະສາຣ; พระเจ้าสิริบุญสาร) Xaiya Setthathirath III. Anou was known by his father's regnal number until recently discovered records disclosed that his father and brother had the same regnal name.

== Reign ==
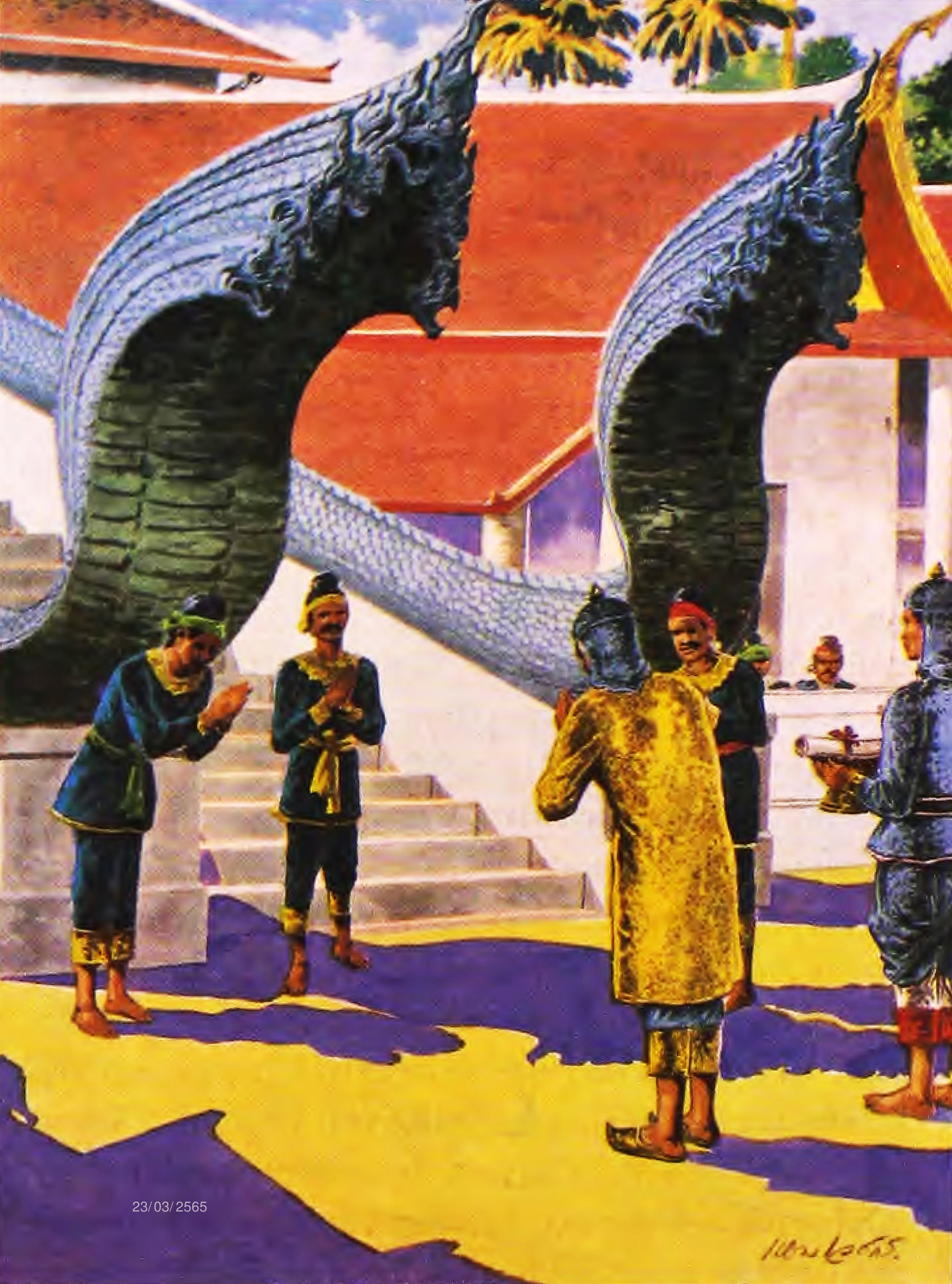
In 1804, Anouvong was appointed by Bangkok as ruler of Vientiane after the death of his elder brother, Inthavong. Illustrated by Hem Vejakorn (c.1969).

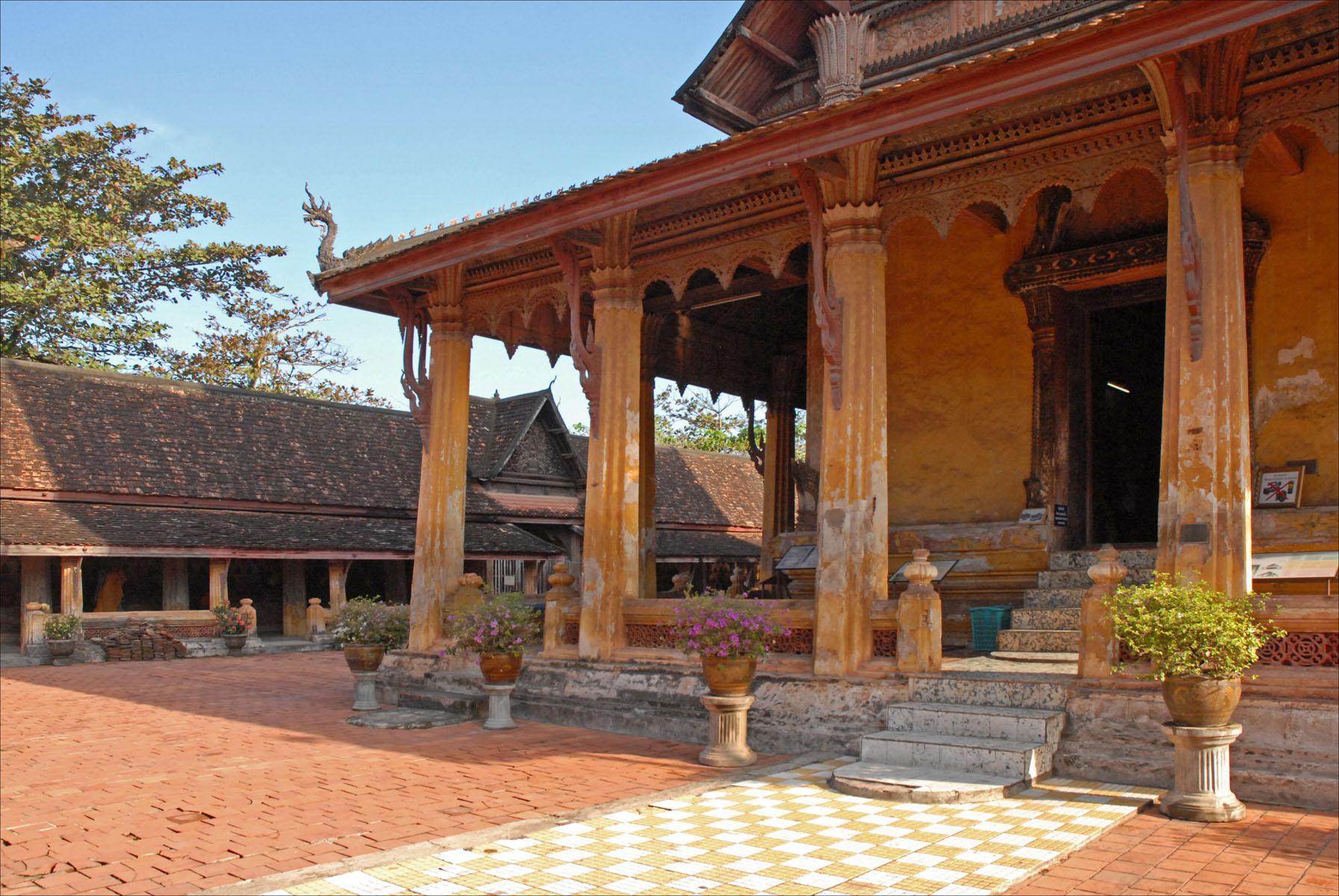
Wat Si Saket, Vientiane. Completed by King Anouvong in 1824.

In 1779, following the fall of Vientiane to the army of Taksin of the Thonburi Kingdom, the city was looted but was spared destruction. However, the Emerald Buddha and several other important Buddha images were taken to Thonburi, and the sons and daughter of Ong Bun or King Siribounyasan were taken as hostages, along with several thousand Lao families, who were resettled in Saraburi, north of the Thai capital. Siribounyasan had three sons, who were all to succeed him as king of Vientiane – Nanthasen, Inthavong, and Anouvong.

On the death of King Siribounyasan in 1781, Siam allowed his eldest son, Nathasen, to return to Vientiane as king. He was permitted to take with him the Phra Bang, a gold Buddharupa that had, according to legend had been originally brought from Angkor by Fa Ngum, the first king of Lan Xang, and was taken to Thonburi in 1779. In 1791, Nanthasan convinced Rama I that King Anourouth of Luang Phrabang was secretly meeting with the Bamar-ruled Konbaung Kingdom and plotting a rebellion against Thonburi. Nathasan was allowed to attack Luang Prabang and capture the city in 1792. The Luang Phrabang royal family were sent to Bangkok as prisoners and remained there for four years. Two years later, Nanthasan was himself accused of plotting a rebellion with the Lao governor of Nakhon Phanom, allegedly having made diplomatic overtures to Tây Sơn Vietnam. Nanthasen was arrested and possibly executed in 1794.

In 1795, Inthavong was installed as King of Vientiane, with his brother Anouvong assuming the traditional post of oupahat (Lao: ອຸປຮາດ, "vice-king"). Burmese armies invaded Siam in both 1797 and 1802, and Inthavong dispatched several Lao armies under Anouvong to assist in the defense. Anouvong gained recognition for his bravery and won several major victories at Sipsong Chao Thai.

Inthavong died in 1804, and Anouvong succeeded him as the ruler of Vientiane. However, by 1813 he had begun a series of religious and symbolic acts which remain highly controversial. Anouvong called a great council of the sangha, only the third ever held in Laotian history, and it was decided that a new Emerald Buddha would be carved. Anouvong ordered repairs on the Ho Phra Kèo, and also ordered several new temples to be established and dedicated to the Emerald Buddha. Bizarrely, he ordered a major bridge to be built across the wide Mekong.

In 1819 Anouvong rushed to suppress a rebellion in the Kingdom of Champasak, led by a charismatic monk, who had caused the ruler to flee to Bangkok. Anouvong's son Nyô led an army south from Vientiane and easily suppressed the uprising. As the king of Champasak had died, Rama II of Siam appointed Nyô the new ruler of Champasak. Anouvong had succeeded in uniting two of the three Lao kingdoms under his control. Also that year, Anouwong ordered the construction of Wat Si Saket, which was completed in 1824. The temple was a major statement of his authority, since it was oriented so that when Anouvong's vassals came to pledge their annual allegiance, they physically turned their backs on Bangkok.

=== Funeral of Rama II ===
Rama II died in 1824, and it was unclear who would succeed him. The likely successors were young Mongkut, who was the son of Queen Sri Suriyendra, and Mongkut's elder and more experienced half-brother Jessadabodindra, who was only the son of a court concubine. A crisis was avoided when Prince Mongkut chose to become a bhikkhu (Buddhist monk) and Jessadabodindra ascended as Rama III.

The potential crisis had caused the military to be on high alert, and the British Empire, who had recently begun the First Anglo-Burmese War, monitored closely the situation.

In the midst of these events, the Lao kings of Luang Phrabang, Vientiane, and Champasak made their way to Bangkok for the royal funeral ceremonies to be held the following year in accordance with custom. Rama III had already begun implementing the census and forced tattooing policies in the Khorat Plateau. Anouvong's retinue and one of his sons were impressed into corvee projects, including digging canals, felling sugar palms, harvesting bamboo, and constructing the Phra Samut Chedi. At one of the projects, Anouvong's son allegedly had been mocked and possibly even beaten. Anouvong was furious and cut short the traditional obeisance at the Chakri court.

It is not clear whether Anouvong had decided to rebel during his stay in Bangkok, or he had planned it earlier and was just awaiting an excuse. Nevertheless, he made demands before he left. He wanted the return of the Emerald Buddha (which had originally been brought to Vientiane from Chiang Mai), the release of his sister (taken hostage forty-five years earlier), and the return of the Lao families who had been relocated in Saraburi. Thai historians write that Anouvong rebelled over a personal slight, since each of his requests was denied and he was told he could return with only one dancer from his retinue. However, the intensity of his rebellion suggests that his motivations were more complex.

== Rebellion ==
By 1826, Anouvong was making military preparations for rebellion. His strategy involved three key points: 1) respond to the immediate crisis caused by the popular discontent over the forced tattooing; 2) remove the ethnic Lao on the Khorat Plateau to the Kingdom of Vientiane, conducting a scorched Earth policy as he did so to slow the inevitable Siamese pursuit; and 3) seek a diplomatic victory by gaining support from Vietnam, China or Britain.

Anouvong may have believed that the balance of power in Southeast Asia was turning away from Siam. The factionalism at the Siamese court, the presence of the British in nearby Burma, the growing influence of Vietnam in the Cambodian provinces, and the regional dissatisfaction in the Lao areas suggested that Siamese power was waning. In 1826, the British had arrived to finalize the Burney Treaty between Siam and the British Empire, and the presence of the British fleet may have led Anouvong to believe that an invasion was imminent. However, his most serious miscalculation was in the disparity of military power between Siam and Laos. From at least 1822, Siam had been purchasing large quantities of modern firearms and ammunition from Britain, which had a military surplus from the recently ended Napoleonic Wars.

In December 1826, Anouvong's rebellion began with an army of 10 000 men making its way toward Kalasin, following the path of the Siamese tattooing officials. In January, Anouvong led a second larger force towards Nakhon Ratchasima and was able to take the city by a ruse. A contingent of Anouvong's army was sent to Lomsak and Chaiyaphum, before making its way to Saraburi to bring the Lao families there back to Vientiane. A fourth army led by Anouvong's son Nyô, the King of Champasak, was dispatched to take Ubon. All of these armies moved under a web of misinformation and false dispatches that warned of impending attacks on Siam by neighbouring powers.

Anouvong's planned retreats were slowed by the civilians who occupied the roads and passes. Lao commanders also delayed to search for the Thai officials responsible for tattooing, forcing those captured to march north as prisoners. Anouvong wasted foolishly over a month searching for the governor of Nakhon Ratchasima, who had been a key figure in the tattooing and population transfers.

Siam quickly organized a massive counterstrike and dispatched two armies, one by way of Saraburi to retake Nakhon Ratchasima, and the other through the Pasak Valley towards Lomsak. Anouvong's forces withdrew to Nong Bua Lamphu, the strongest fortress on the Khorat Plateau and traditionally held by the crown prince of Vientiane. After a three-day battle, Nong Bua Lamphu finally fell, and Anouvong's men fell back to a second line of defence. Siamese strength and modern arms were greater than what Anouvong had imagined, and his armies continued to march towards Vientiane. They defended the city for five days, as Anouvong fled for his life towards the border with Vietnam.

Siamese general Phraya Ratchasuphawadi, later promoted to Chao Phraya Bodindecha, at last took Anouvong's capital city. He sacked the palaces and levelled the city's defences, but he left the monasteries and much of the city intact. Following the sacking of Vientiane, the rulers of Chiang Mai, Lampang, Lamphun, Nan, Phrae, and the kingdom of Luang Phrabang all pledged their renewed allegiance to Siam, although Phraya Bodindecha noted that they had “waited to see the turn of events, and their actions greatly depended on the outcome of the war.”

Bodindecha spent several months organizing the removal of the remaining people from around Vientiane and confiscating all arms and ammunition. He then left a small garrison across the river opposite the empty city and returned to the Khorat Plateau.

Anouvong eventually returned with about 1 000 soldiers and 100 Vietnamese observers. This small force was meant only to negotiate a settlement with Siam. However, he learned that a nine-spire stupa had been erected as a victory monument at Wat Thung Sawang Chaiyaphum (วัดทุ่งสว่างชัยภูมิ) in the town of Yasothon. This enraged him, and he crossed the Mekong and attacked the 300 Thai defenders, killing all but about 40. The now furious Rama III ordered Chao Phraya Bodindecha to return and completely destroy Vientiane, and to capture Anouvong at all costs.

Chao Phraya Bondindecha pursued Anouvong to Xieng Khouang, where according to some accounts he was betrayed by Chao Noy and handed over to the Siamese. Anouvong and his family were placed under heavy guard and marched to Bangkok. Sir John Bowring quotes a British observer as recalling:

[The king] was confined in a large iron cage exposed to a burning sun, and obliged to proclaim to everyone that the King of Siam was great and merciful, that he himself had committed a great error and deserved his present punishment. In this cage were placed with the prisoner, a large mortar to pound him in, a large boiler to boil him in, a hook to hang him by, and a sword to decapitate him; also a sharp-pointed spike for him to sit on. His children were sometimes put in along with him. He was a mild, respectable-looking, old grey-haired man, and did not live long to gratify his tormentors, death having put an end to his sufferings. His body was taken and hung in chains on the bank of the river, about two or three miles below Bangkok.

== Aftermath ==
The city of Vientiane was totally destroyed and its population completely relocated. The destruction was so thorough that the first French explorers more than 30 years later found only ruins in a jungle to show where the city had once been. The remaining Lao kingdoms of Champasak and Luang Phrabang understandably came under stricter control and arms limitations, while the Khorat Plateau was formally annexed by Siam. Regional rivals Siam and Vietnam would come into increasing conflict over control of the inland trade and Lao territory, leading to the Siamese-Vietnamese Wars of the 1830s. Vietnam annexed the Lao principality of Xieng Khouang, and Chinese bandits after the Taiping Rebellion were able to force their way down the Mekong River to fight what became known as the Haw Wars of the 1860s. The first French explorers navigating the Mekong River used the political vacuum as a convenient excuse to create their own colony of French Indochina.

== Legacy ==
The most significant legacy of Anouvong's Lao Rebellion was the impact of the forced population transfers throughout the region. As a consequence of the warfare and population transfers of the eighteenth and nineteenth centuries, there are now over 19 million ethnic Lao living in the Isan region of Thailand, while less than 6 million live in the independent country of Laos.

During the French colonial period, Vientiane was rebuilt as the Laotian capital in a deliberate attempt win favor and to demonstrate French authority.

Several accounts of the Siamese-Lao conflict have been written by historians and authorities, many in direct conflict with one another. In particular, the accounts of the Siamese heroines Thao Suranari (or “Lady Mo”) and Khunying Bunleu have been popularized and possibly exaggerated. During the 1930s, Field Marshall Phibun promoted Siamese legends as part of a political and military campaign to unify all of the Tai peoples.

The Siamese government also named schools and a museum after the victorious general. However, modern Lao nationalist movements have turned Anouvong into a hero, even though his rebellion caused the end of the kingdom of Lan Xang, the destruction of Vientiane, and a permanent division of the Lao people between the country of Laos and the Lao-speaking provinces of northeastern Thailand. Nevertheless, his rebellion is regarded as the point at which Lao nationality and identity solidified. He has been credited with the existence of the modern country of Laos, which might have otherwise have been completely incorporated into Thailand, as was the neighboring Tai Yuan kingdom of Lanna.

== Memorials ==
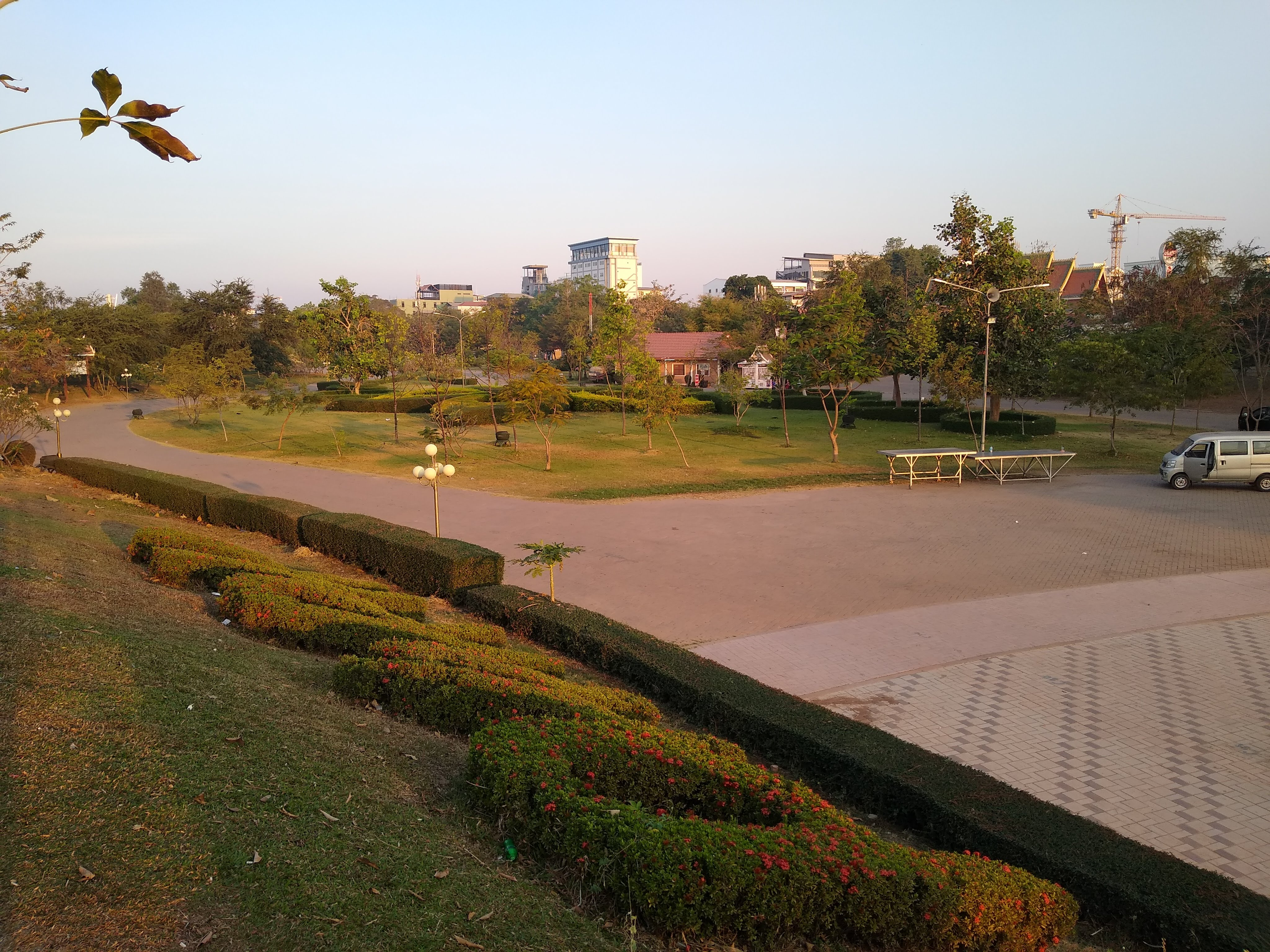
Chao Anouvong Park in Vientiane

Anouvong had ordered Wat Si Saket to be built in Vientiane, and his name will always be connected with it. An elephant howdah he once owned and used is on display in the Lao National Museum in Vientiane.

In 2010, to coincide with the 450th Anniversary celebrations of Vientiane, the Laos government created Chao Anouvong Park, complete with a large bronze statue of the locally revered ruler.

== Children ==
Chao Anouvong had 27 children.

Princes

1. Sadet Chao Fa Jaya Sudhisara Suriya (Sonthesan Sua or Poh) - his descendants use the surname "Siddhisariputra" which was given by King Vajiravudh of Thailand.
2. Sadet Chao Fa Jaya Nagaya (Ngao)
3. Sadet Chao Fa Jaya Yuva (Rajabud Yoh or Nyô), Viceroy of Champasak
4. Sadet Chao Fa Jaya Deva (Teh)
5. Sadet Chao Fa Jaya Barna (Banh)
6. Sadet Chao Fa Jaya Duang Chandra (Duang Chanh)
7. Sadet Chao Fa Jaya Kiminhiya (Khi Menh, Khi Hia or Khli), Viceroy of Vientiane
  maternal grandfather of Princess Nariratana and Princess Pradithasaree.
8. Sadet Chao Fa Jaya Kamabinga (Kham Pheng)
9. Sadet Chao Fa Jaya Oanaya (Pane)
10. Sadet Chao Fa Jaya Suvarna Chakra (Suvannachak)
11. Sadet Chao Fa Jaya Jayasara (Sayasane)
12. Sadet Chao Fa Jaya Suriya (Suea) - father of Chao Phromthewanukroh (Noh Kham), the last ruler of Ubon Ratchathani before the Monthon Thesaphiban system. His descendants use the surname "Brahmopala" (given by King Vajiravudh of Thailand), "Devanugraha" and "Brahmadeva."
13. Sadet Chao Fa Jaya Maen
14. Sadet Chao Fa Jaya Jangaya (Chang)
15. Sadet Chao Fa Jaya Ungagama (Ung Kham)
16. Sadet Chao Fa Jaya Khatiyara (Khattignah)
17. Sadet Chao Fa Jaya Buddhasada (Phuthasath)
18. Sadet Chao Fa Jaya Tissabunga (Disaphong)
19. Sadet Chao Fa Jaya Dhanandra (Theman)
20. Sadet Chao Fa Jaya Hien Noi
21. Sadet Chao Fa Jaya Ong-La
22. Sadet Chao Fa Jaya Phui
23. Sadet Chao Fa Jaya Chang
24. Sadet Chao Fa Jaya Khi
25. Sadet Chao Fa Jaya Anura (Nu)
26. Sadet Chao Fa Jaya Thuan
27. Sadet Chao Fa Jaya Di

Princesses

1. Sadet Chao Fa Jaya Nang Nujini (Nu Chin)
2. Sadet Chao Fa Jaya Nang Sri
  raised the rank of Chao Chom Manda after giving birth, a concubine of Maha Senanurak, Viceroy of Siam
3. Sadet Chao Fa Jaya Nang Chandrajumini (Chantarachome)
  raised the rank of Chao Chom Manda after giving birth, a concubine of King Rama III of Siam.
4. Sadet Chao Fa Jaya Nang Gamavani (Kham Vanh)
5. Sadet Chao Fa Jaya Nang Jangami (Siang Kham)
6. Sadet Chao Fa Jaya Nang Gamabangi (Kham Pheng)
7. Sadet Chao Fa Jaya Nang Buyi (Nang Nu)
  a concubine of King Rama III of Siam.

== See also ==
- Lao rebellion (1826–28)
- Military history of Thailand
- Laos–Thailand relations

Anouvong Kingdom of Vientiane Born: 1767 Died: 12 November 1828
Regnal titles
Preceded by Inthavong	King of Vientiane; 7 February 1805 – 12 November 1828	Kingdom annexed
