= Thao Suranari =

Thai rebel in 19th century Siam

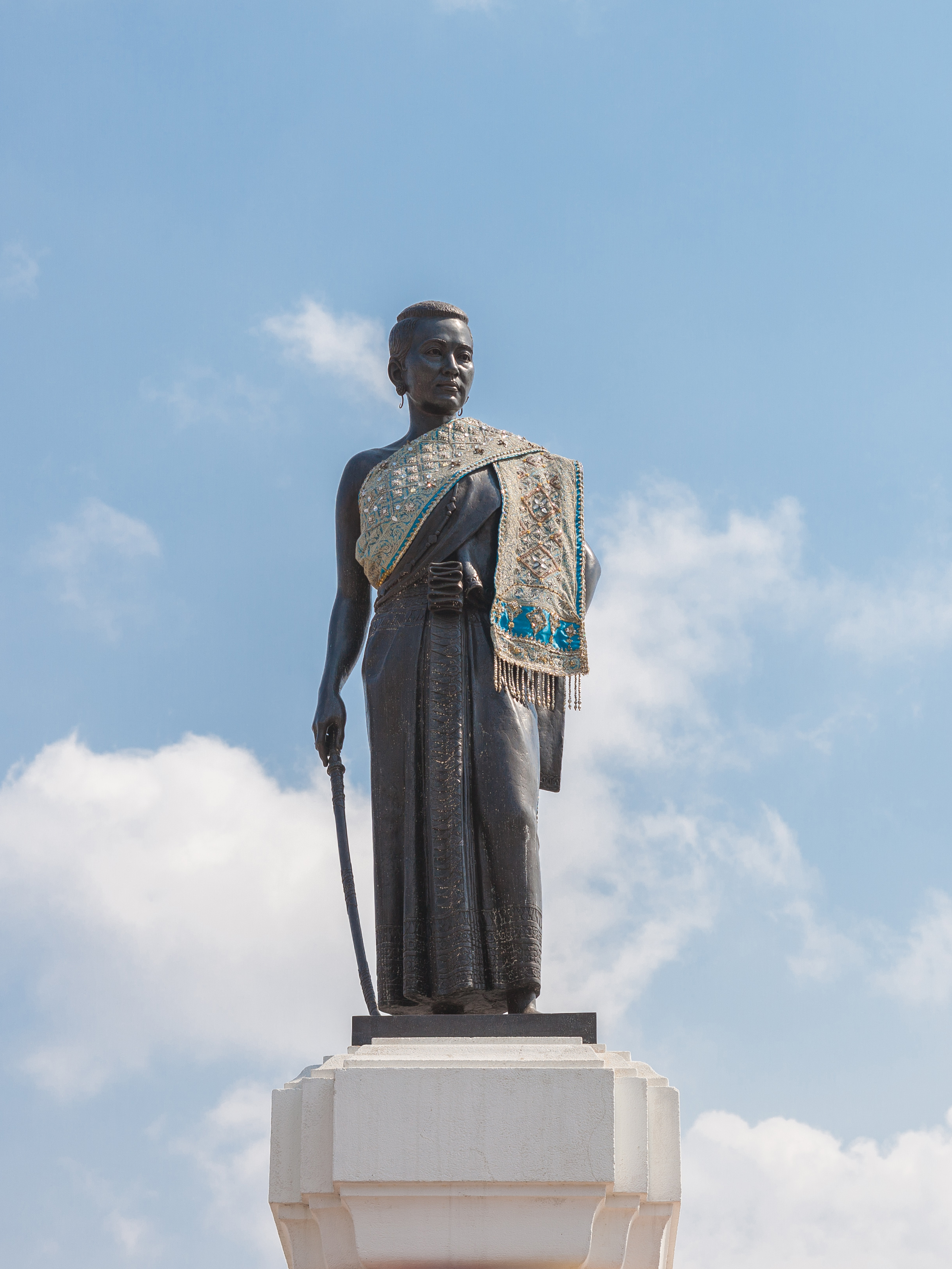
Statue of Thao Suranari, standing at the city centre of Korat

Thao Suranari (Thai: ท้าวสุรนารี; 1771–1852) is the royally bestowed title of Lady Mo, also known as Ya Mo (ย่าโม, "Grandma Mo"), who was the wife of the deputy governor of Nakhon Ratchasima (Korat), the stronghold of Siamese control over its Laotian vassals.

Thao Suranari, hailed from Nakhon Ratchasima. She resided across from Wat Phra Narai Maharat, the main temple in Nakhon Ratchasima, situated to the city's south.

In 1826, King Anouvong of Vientiane invaded Siam, seeking complete independence. Anouvong's forces seized the city of Nakhon Ratchasima by a ruse when the governor was away. The invaders evacuated the inhabitants, intending to resettle them in Laos. Lady Mo is credited with saving her people by harassing the enemy. Varying stories describe her either getting the invading soldiers drunk, or leading a rebellion of the prisoners on the way back to Vientiane. The generally accepted version is that, when the Lao invaders ordered the women to cook for them, Lady Mo requested knives so that food might be prepared. That night, when the invaders were asleep, she gave the knives to the imprisoned men. They surprised the Lao troops, who fled, and the prisoners escaped. Thai King Rama III soon sent an army in pursuit, led by General Sing Singhaseni (สิงห์ สิงหเสนี). He defeated Anuvoung's forces in three days of fighting and completely destroyed Anuvoung's capital city of Vientiane.

King Rama III awarded her the title Thao Suranari, (or Lady Suranari – "the brave lady") in recognition of her courageous acts.

== Statue ==
A statue of Thao Suranari stands in the centre of Nakhon Ratchasima, and is a popular object of devotion. A festival in her honour is held each year at the end of March and the beginning of April. The statue was designed by Phra Thewaphinimmit (พระเทวาภินิมมิต) (1888–1942) and sculpted by Silpa Bhirasri. Thao Suranari's statue was placed next to the Chumphon Gate of the city wall on January 15, 1934.

It has since been suggested that the story of Thao Suranari was somewhat embellished during the Thai nationalist movement under Field Marshal Plaek Phibunsongkhram in the 1930s.

As part of a 77 million baht city center renovation project, dirt and trees were uprooted for construction of a new tree-lined watercourse, a central stage, and to upgrade the Lady Mo monument and redo Chumphon Gate.

== See also ==
- Lao rebellion (1826–28)
- Military history of Thailand
- Nakhon Ratchasima
- Anouvong
