= Lao rebellion (1826–1828) =

Rebellion of the Kingdom of Vientiane against Siam

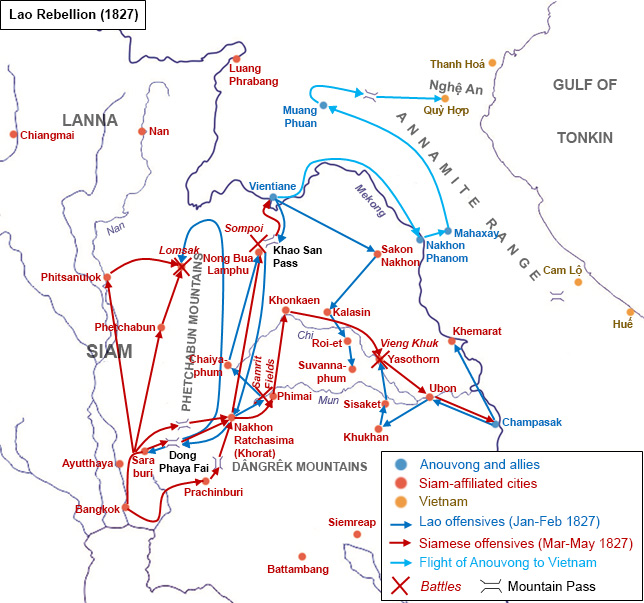
- Blue represents Lao army routes. Red represents Siamese army routes. Light blue represents Anouvong's flight to Vietnam.
Date	1826–1828
Location	Khorat Plateau, Thailand; Central and Southern Laos
Result	Siamese victory
Territorial changes	Siam consolidates control over Vientiane and Champasak

Belligerents
Kingdom of Vientiane; Kingdom of Champasak; Military support: Nguyễn dynasty (Note: Vietnamese observers totaled 80-100.)	Rattanakosin Kingdom (Siam)

Commanders and leaders
King Anouvong (executed); Raxavong Ngao; Uparat Tissa (surrendered); Chao Nyô (surrendered)	King Nangklao; Somdet Phra Sakdiphonlasep; Chaophraya Bodindecha; Thao Suranari

The Lao Rebellion of 1826–1828 (also known as Anouvong's Rebellion) was an attempt by King Anouvong (Xaiya Sethathirath V) of the Kingdom of Vientiane to end the suzerainty of Siam and recreate the former kingdom of Lan Xang. In January 1827 the Lao armies of the kingdoms of Vientiane and Champasak moved south and west across the Khorat Plateau, advancing as far as Saraburi, just three days' march from the Siamese capital of Bangkok. The Siamese mounted a counterattack to the north and east, forcing the Lao forces to retreat and ultimately taking the capital of Vientiane. Anouvong failed in both his attempt to resist Siamese encroachment, and to check the further political fragmentation among the Lao. The kingdom of Vientiane was abolished, its population was forcibly moved to Siam, and its former territories fell under the direct control of Siamese provincial administration. The kingdoms of Champasak and Lan Na were drawn more closely into the Siamese administrative system. The kingdom of Luang Prabang was weakened but allowed the most regional autonomy. In its expansion into the Lao states, Siam overextended itself. The rebellion was a direct cause of the Siamese—Vietnamese wars in the 1830s and 1840s. The slave raids and forced population transfers conducted by Siam led to a demographic disparity between the areas that would ultimately become Thailand and Laos, and facilitated the "civilizing mission" of the French into Lao areas during the latter half of the nineteenth century.

The legacy of the rebellion remains controversial. Thai historiography has portrayed Anouvong as petty and his rebellion which came close to Bangkok as dangerous. Thai nationalist movements in the mid-twentieth century have seized onto local heroes such as Lady Mo, and Chao Phaya Lae as symbols of loyalty and "Thai" identity. Lao historiography has emphasized the role of Anouvong in promoting a sense of "Lao" identity, and has become a symbol of independence against foreign influence. Laos similarly promotes local heroes including Ratsavong Ngau and Anouvong himself, who was memorialized in 2010 with a large statute in central Vientiane.

== Background ==
=== Burma, Siam, and the Lao states ===
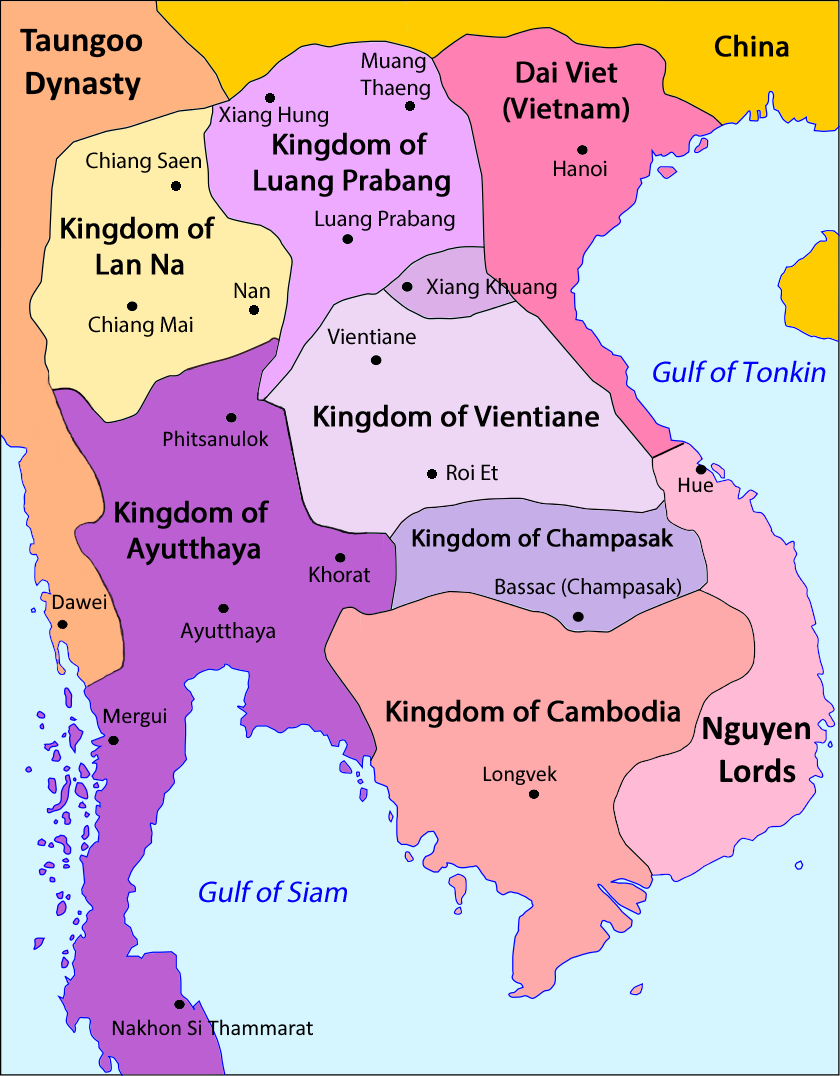
Southeast Asia in the 18th century showing the Lao kingdoms of Vientiane, Luang Prabang, Champasak, and the principality of Phuan (Xieng Khuang)

In 1763, the armies of the Burmese King Alaungpaya took Chiang Mai as a prelude to advancing on Siam. In 1765 they invaded Luang Prabang with the aid of King Siribunnyasan of Vientiane, in an effort to stave off a similar fate at Burmese hands. In addition to many horses, elephants, and supplies for war, the Burmese also carried off one of the king's younger brothers as security for the treaty they obtained, and at the same time concluded an alliance with Vientiane. The prince who was taken captive would later escape and returned to Luang Prabang, and would become King Tiao Vongsa. In 1767 King Alaungpaya's armies destroyed the city and polity of Ayutthaya, however, over the next few decades the kingdom was re-constituted under a series of aggressive rulers, beginning with Chao Phraya Taksin whose capital was based at Thonburi, south of the ruins of Ayutthaya. By the 1770s Taksin had won back the old Ayutthayan core territories, and was resisting renewed Burmese incursions and in the process also expanding Siam's influence further to the Lao areas of north, north-east, and east.

Throughout the Burmese-Siamese wars of the mid eighteenth century, each side became involved in Lao affairs to strengthen their own forces and to deny strength to their enemy. The use of competing alliances further militarized the conflict between the Lao kingdoms of Luang Prabang and Vientiane. If one of the Lao kingdoms formed an alliance with either Burma or Siam, the other would tend to support the opposite side. The network of alliances, and distrust, shifted repeatedly with the political and military landscape throughout the period.

King Siribunnyasan was caught in a balancing act between the Burmese and Taksin's Siam. He first sought an alliance with Taksin in early 1770, who in turn sought aid from Vientiane in a planned campaign against the Burmese at Chiang Mai. However, within a year, Siribunnyasan was besieged by Luang Prabang for two months, and he sought assistance from the Burmese forces in Chiang Mai. Siribunnyasan also secured Burmese assistance in suppressing an insurrection of two of his disaffected officials who had revolted and declared Nong Bua Lamphu an independent principality. On their return, the Burmese forces went to Chiang Mai, carrying with them some of Sribunnyasan's children and court officials as hostages. In return for the Burmese assistance, Siribunnyasan was to attack Siam's northeastern stronghold of Nakhon Ratchasima (Khorat City) a move planned to coincide with a Burmese invasion of Siam. The situation became more complex, to the detriment of Vientiane. When Siamese forces took Chiang Mai from the Burmese in 1774 they found some of Siribunnyasan's officials present, arousing Taksin's suspicions. At the same time, Siam and Luang Prabang entered into an alliance.

In 1777 Vientiane launched a punitive attack on Phra Wo, the surviving leader of the revolt at Nong Bua Lamphu who had sought refuge near Champasak and established his own village at Ban Du Ban Kae near today's Ubon Ratchathani. Phra Wo had fallen out with King Saiyakuman of Champasak, and King Siribunnyasan took the opportunity to have him killed, but not before Phra Wo and his sons had sought vassalage under Siamese protection and sent word that Vientiane was secretly cooperating with the Burmese.

On the pretext that Vientiane had conspired with the Burmese and murdered Phra Wo a Siamese vassal, Siamese armies moved to punish both Vientiane and Champasak in 1778 and in so doing they expanded the political and tribute orbit of Taksin's state. General Chao Phraya Chakri with a force of 20,000 marched overland toward Vientiane, while a separate force of 10,000 under General Surasi came up on Vientiane from the south, taking Champasak, Nakhon Phanom, and Nongkhai. The Siamese forces combined and besieged Vientiane for four months, eventually being assisted by the kingdom of Luang Prabang.

Following their victory, the troops looted the city and took the sacred Phra Saek Kham, Phra Bang and Phra Kaew Buddha images to Thonburi, and forcibly resettled thousands of Lao families to Saraburi, Ratchaburi province, and Chanthaburi on the Gulf of Siam. All the members of the Vientiane Kingdom's royal family, except Siribunnyasan himself, were taken to the Siamese capital. In 1779, the Siamese withdrew from the kingdoms of Vientiane and Champasak, leaving them under temporary military rule, while the kingdom of Luang Prabang accepted Siamese suzerainty. By 1782 the Siamese general who had conducted the campaign, Chao Phraya Chakkri, overthrew Taksin, establishing a new dynasty as King Rama I and a new capital opposite Thonburi at Bangkok. King Rama I adopted the Phra Kaew image as the palladium of his new city and dynasty.

=== Territorial conflict on the Khorat Plateau ===
After the fall of Angkorian Empire in the fifteenth century, the territories of Khorat Plateau that corresponds to modern-day Isan region were depopulated. Most of major towns or human settlements were concentrated along the Mekong-vicinity region to the northeast that belonged to the Lanxang Kingdom and around Nakhon Ratchasima to the southwest that was under Siam. Most of the central plains of Chi-Mun valley were sparsely inhabited covered by forests and roamed by local Austroasiatic-speaking kha, Kuy and Northern Khmer tribes, becoming a political no-man's land. There was hardly any recorded towns in this area before the eighteenth century. In 1718, King Nokasad of Champasak founded the town of Thong or Suwannaphum as the first Lao town on the Chi valley. In 1763, due to a political conflict, Suwannaphum seceded from Champasak while another faction founded the rival town of Roi-et in 1775. Both Roi-et and Suwannaphum submitted and became parts of Siamese Thonburi Kingdom in 1776.

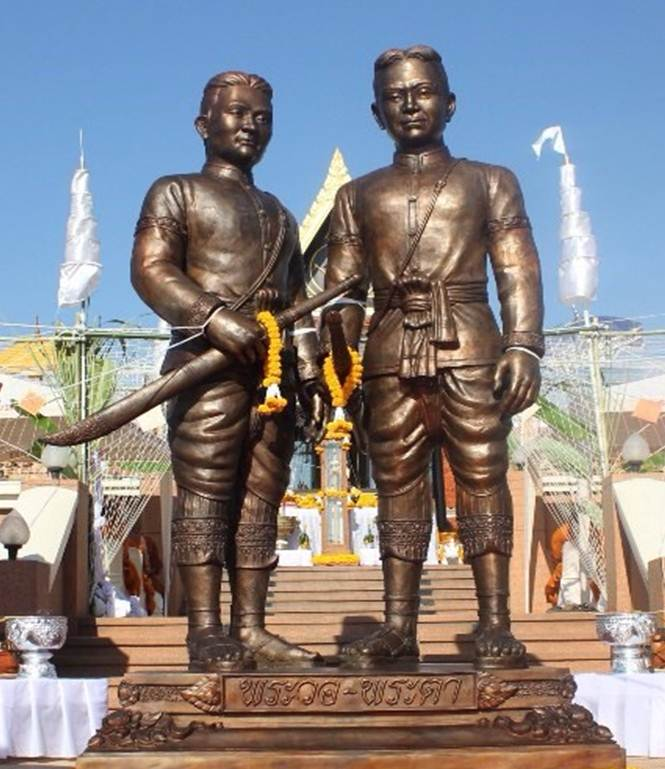
Statues of Phra Ta and Phra Vo in modern city of Nong Bua Lamphu.

In 1767, two Lao brethren nobles by the name of Phra Ta and Phra Vo rebelled against King Ong Boun of Vientiane. Phra Ta and Phra Vo established their new town called Nakhon Khueankhan (in modern Nong Bua Lamphu) and seceded from Vientiane. Ong Boun managed to defeat the rebel brothers in 1771. Phra Ta was killed in battle, while his brother Phra Vo escaped to seek refuge in Champasak. Seven years later in 1778, Phra Vo had conflicts with Sayakumane of Champasak. Ong Boun took this opportunity to attack and killed Phra Vo. Thau Kam, son of Phra Vo, informed Siam about his father's death at the hands of Vientiane. King Taksin, who regarded Phra Vo as his subject because Phra Vo had sought alliance with him earlier, dispatched Siamese armies to conquer Lao kingdoms in response. The death of Phra Vo became the casus belli for Taksin's subjugation of Laos.

Siamese authorities in Khorat Plateau traditionally centered on the area around the cities of Nakhon Ratchasima and Phimai. During the reign of King Rama I (1782–1809), direct Siamese administration of the Khorat Plateau greatly expanded into the areas that had been held as parts of the Lao kingdoms (i.e. Kingdom of Vientiane, Kingdom of Champasak, and Lan Xang). Cities and surrounding areas (mueang) that had been integral to the Kingdoms of Vientiane and Champasak, were brought into Siamese control through the efforts of the Governor and Deputy-Governor (Yokkrabat) of Nakhon Ratchasima. Also new towns were created through co-opting ambitious local Lao nobles, among them the family and followers of Phra Vo who were hostile to the Vientiane dynasty.

After the death of their father, Khamphong and Fayna, sons of Phra Ta, continued to stay in Champasak and even fought for Champasak against the Siamese in 1778. In 1791, a man named Xiengkaeo who claimed to possess magical powers rebelled against Champasak. King Sayakumane of Champasak died from illness during these events. Khamphong and Fayna raised their army to successfully defeat and kill Xiengkaeo. The Bangkok court rewarded the two victors. Khamphong was made the first governor of Ubon as a direct vassal to Bangkok, while his brother Fayna was made the new ruler of Champasak with the title of Phra Wisaiyarat Khattiyawongsa. Fayna ruled Champasak until his death in 1811, when a grandson of Sayakumane was made to succeed in Champasak. Khamsing, son of Fayna, refused to be a subject of Champasak and demanded to have his own fief. Bangkok then appointed Khamsing as the first governor of Yasothon, again as a separate direct vassal at the expense of Champasak.

In 1814, Thau Kam, son of Phra Vo, was made the governor of Khemmarat. Suvannaphum suffered a local succession dispute in 1793, and Siam began the elevation of village officials who would declare their allegiance to Siam. Mueang Ubon, Chonnabot, Khon Kaen, Phutthaisong were founded from territory and people who had formerly been part of Suvannaphum. In 1815, the Governor of Nakhon Ratchasima had the leader of Suvannaphum accused by his own wife of maladministration, and was subsequently sent to Bangkok and executed in Saraburi. According to Siamese records, during the period the number of towns in the region had increased from thirteen to thirty-five. The process of division and local opposition was ongoing up to the rebellion of Anouvong in 1826, however the areas directly across from the city of Vientiane and the areas of Nakhon Phanom, Mahachai-Kongkeo, and Khamkeut remained vassals to the Kingdom of Vientiane.

The governors (chao mueang) of these "west bank" Mekong valley towns were semi-independent within their own jurisdictions. Decisions involving war, capital punishment, appointment of higher officials would be referred to Nakhon Ratchasima or Bangkok. Provinces were attached to various Siamese officials and ministries, and had to render taxes and labor. Periodic censuses were made, and boundaries were set and changed by the central administration in Bangkok in order to create more towns. There was a policy to reward chao mueang for increases in population and territory by awarding them titles as high as phraya. In general, the area did not differ greatly from the rest of Siam.

The "east bank" kingdoms of Vientiane, Luang Prabang and Champasak were more independent as vassals to the suzerainty of Siam. These states had much greater powers, including capital punishment, making war with Siamese consent, and appointing all but the four highest officials within the kingdom. In practice, the appointment of highest officials was often made locally by a council of nobility and then submitted to Bangkok for approval. The states’ obligations to provide revenue and corvée labor were curtailed to providing annual tribute (including "gold and silver trees,") and armies in times of war. Each of the three Lao states had its own vassals, and to some extent, carried on limited independent foreign relations.

==== "Forest Cambodia ====
During the last decade of Ayutthaya, Siam managed to expand its influence into what was called Khamen Pa Dong (Thai: เขมรป่าดง), or literally "Forest Cambodia", corresponding to modern Southern Isan in Sisaket and Surin Provinces, which were inhabited by independent Kuy and Northern Khmer tribes. Local leaders of Khukhan, Sangkha and Banteay Sman (Surin) submitted to Siam in 1759 and paid their tributary Suay taxes in form of forest products.

When King Taksin ordered Chaophraya Chakri to invade Champasak in 1777, these local leaders of Forest Cambodia supported Siam and were given the ranks of Phraya as the governor of their cities. Among these was Xiengkhan who was made Phraya Kraiphakdi the governor of Khukhan. In 1778, Phraya Kraiphakdi Xiengkhan joined the campaign to invade Vientiane during the Siamese Invasion of Laos. From the war, Xiengkhan adopted a Lao young captive man named Boonchan as his adoptive son and groomed him to be his successor. However, in an argument, Xiengkhan accidentally called his adoptive son the 'prisoner-of-war'. This angered Boonchan and he sought to retaliate. When his father accommodated Vietnamese merchants out of hospitality, Boonchan filed a case to Bangkok accusing his adoptive father of sedition by pursuing Vietnamese alliance. Xiengkhan was brought to Bangkok for trials where he died soon. Boonchan was then made Phraya Kraiphakdi the new governor of Khukhan. However, Boonchan faced oppositions from the family of Xiengkhan in the local administration. This led to internecine conflicts within Khukhan that prompted Chaophraya Nakhon Ratchasima Thong-in and Phraya Palat to lead Siamese armies from Nakhon Ratchasima to settle down and subjugate these insurrections in Khukhan in 1826.

== Forces ==
=== Kingdom of Vientiane ===
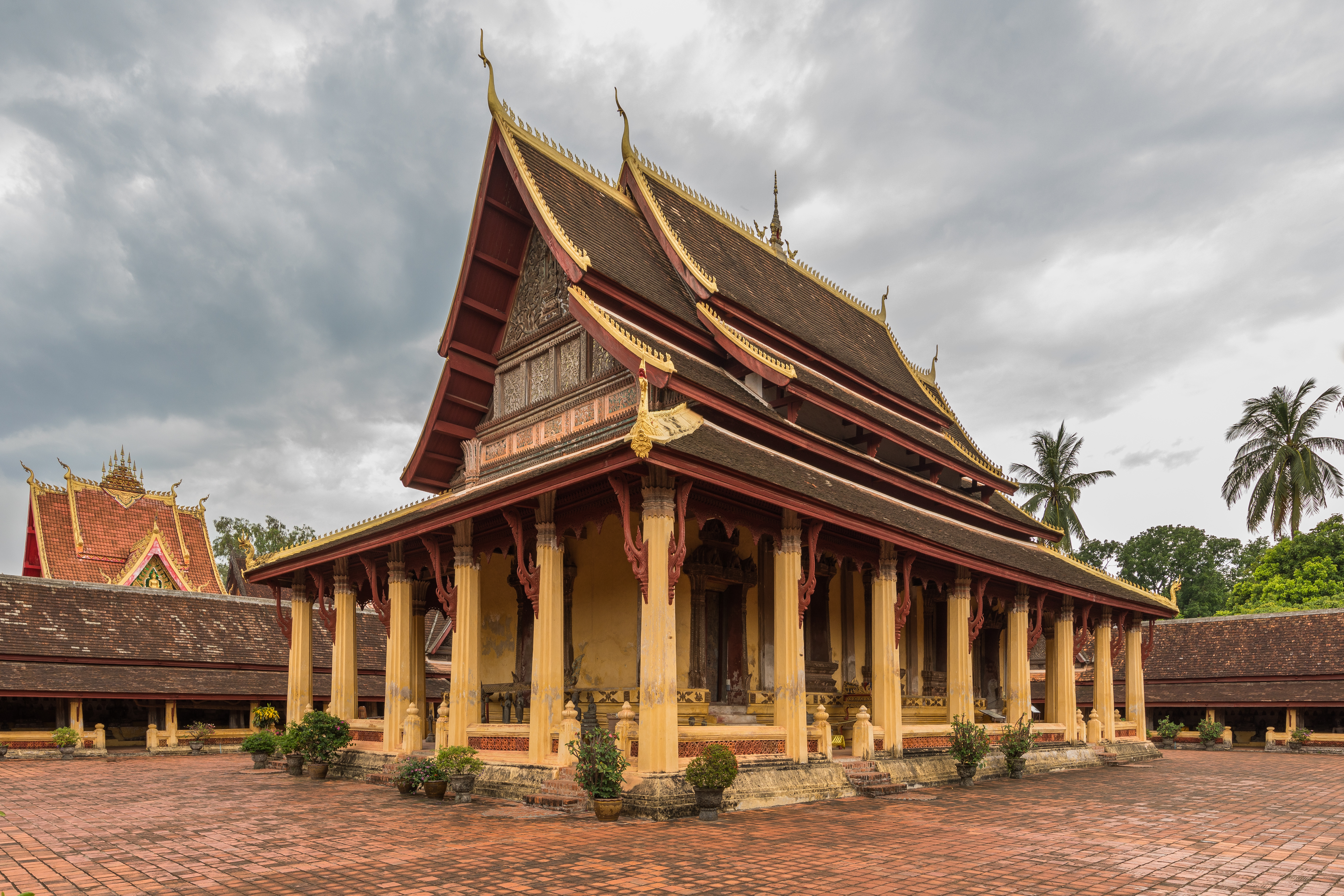
Wat Sisaket, Vientiane. Completed by King Anouvong in 1824.

Established as the royal capital of Lan Xang in 1560, Vientiane was the largest and most powerful city of the Mekong valley, prominent even before its designation as the seat of royal power. Although dynastic disputes split the Lan Xang kingdom into three competing centers in the early eighteenth century, and left the rulers of Vientiane a reduced territory, this capital remained the largest city of the Lao with a pre-eminent position until 1828.

Vientiane's rulers continued to nurture a symbolic legitimacy that was embodied in the monumental achievements of the earlier Lan Xang monarchs who had helped build the capital and its hinterland of cities and shrines. Chao Anouvong was sent to command Lao contingents fighting alongside the Siamese army in 1795, 1798, 1799 and 1803. He was twice commended by Rama I. In 1804 Anouvong was enthroned by Siam, his early reign was marked by building and renovation of shrines, monuments and fortifications. In 1808 he undertook the first of four pilgrimages to That Phanom, each time he was accompanied by the rulers of Nakhon Phanom and Mukdahan as a means of focusing political and ideological solidarity among his dependencies on the Khorat Plateau. In 1816 Aouvong restored Viantiane's Wat Haw Phra Keo, which had been razed in 1779, and ordered the creation of a new emerald Buddha, the Phra Nak Savatsadi Huan Kaeo. A Wat Phra Keo was also founded by Anouvong at Sri Chiang Mai, across from Vientiane, and in Xiang Khouang, and in Champassak. All these were deliberately political acts, designed to mobilize the loyalty of the population in defiance of Siam.

Throughout his reign Anouvong was laying the foundations of both symbolic legitimacy as well as practical political alliances. Anouvong commissioned stupas including That Dam, and made additions to That Luang. He also repaired the city walls and built a bridge across the Mekong river to connect Sri Chiang Mai to Vientiane. Anouvong also commissioned the construction of Wat Sisaket which began in 1818. Wat Sisaket was built in a Siamese style, and became an important symbolic center, being the place where Anouvong's tributary rulers took their oaths of loyalty to him. The orientation of Wat Sisaket also suggests "political content" as its orientation is different from all other temples in Vientiane. All the other temples are situated parallel to the Mekong; giving them an orthodox west–east direction with the central Buddha image facing east. Wat Sisaket faces "40 degrees south of east" in alignment with the direction of Bangkok, and when oaths were being taken all the participants would have their backs turned in that direction.

Also, Anouvong further emphasized the separate nature of the Lao Sangha, and in 1813 called a Buddhist Council only the third in Lao history. The independence of the Lao Sangha from Bangkok's control is said to have irked Rama III, who wanted Siam to be the unique repository of the Buddhist faith in Southeast Asia. Siamese kings were held to be "world conquerors" (cakravartin) an image which was still popular in the nineteenth century, but such claims would have struggled in the Lao kingdoms where a king's right of rule was founded on authority from actions taken to increase dharma.

=== Siam ===
In 1782 a coup took place against General Taksin which brought to power the Chakri dynasty. The capital was moved from Thongburi to Bangkok on the east bank of the Chaophraya river to be less vulnerable to Burmese attack. As noted by Wyatt, in looking at Siam as a whole "one of its remarkable features is the large number of power centers that existed." Working from the outer layers inward, the first group included semi-independent rulers who did little more than pay tribute to Bangkok on a regular basis and paid tribute to other states as well, including Kedah, Cambodia and Luang Prabang. A second tier, included principalities, who were more integrated into the Siamese system. In addition to larger annual tribute, they were required to provide labor for warfare and public works, sometimes married into Siam's royal family, and occasionally suffered interference in internal affairs. The second group included Chiang Mai, Nan, Vientiane, and Champasak. The third tier included large regional centers around Siam's periphery as quasi independent provinces. These included Songkhla, Nakhon Si Thammarat, Battambang-Siem Reap, and perhaps Nakhon Rachasima. The fourth tier, included the expanding towns of the Khorat Plateau, and the final tier included the core provinces of the kingdom ruled by officials appointed by the capital. The system worked reasonably well because, in an environment in which wealth was still measured primarily in terms of control over labor, the state was able to control the distribution of labor among its constituencies and reserve to the center the majority share of resources.

The reign of Rama III was one of frequent conflict, over twenty-eight years; it encountered eleven revolts and multiple foreign wars. There has always been some controversy about the manner in which the Third Reign began, controversy that has centered on the relative claims of ChetsaBodindecha (Rama III) and Mongkut (Rama IV) to the throne. ChetsaBodindecha was much older, born in 1788 to a royal concubine, daughter to the governor of Nonthaburi. He had long played a leading responsible role in government. Mongkut was born in 1804 to a queen, daughter of Rama I's sister. According to Siamese custom, higher status was granted to princes born to queens, but in law and practice all sons of a king had claim and it was up to the succession council to choose a successor. What seems likely, is that Rama II knew he would soon die and convinced that the accession council to choose ChetsaBodindecha, had Mongkut sent to a Buddhist monastery while still underage.

Rama III was a conservative leader. Rama III was acutely aware that his country was undergoing rapid change and that traditional culture would disappear unless some measures were taken to preserve it. The first years of the Third Reign concerned both foreign and military affairs. Siam's court was seriously divided over the proper responses to Great Britain, and the Burney Mission, but the British victory in Burma convinced the opposition to favor an agreement. They argued that the British has been rebuffed previously and this time might be provoked into hostility if turned down again; and that future conflicts might easily arise along the new Burma-Siam border if amicable relations could not be constructed now. In the short run, Siam seems to have believed it could bear economic sacrifices in order to win political security. In the long run, the difference in customs duties would be made up in new taxes. The treaty brought about a substantial increase in Siam's international trade. At the port of Singapore, only China conducted more trade at the port. Siam was also profiting off the sugar trade. New sugar cultivation methods introduced in Siam between 1810 and 1860 were highly labor-intensive, creating a market incentive to seek out new labor. Rama III gave orders to send the "Chinese, the Lao, and the Khmers" as laborers to develop sugar exports.

=== Kingdom of Luang Prabang and the "five principalities" ===
Relations between the kingdom of Luang Prabang and the kingdom of Vientiane were divided for the fifty years preceding Anouvong's Rebellion. In 1781 the Siamese enthroned Chao Nanthasen as ruler of Vientiane and returned the Phra Bang. In 1791, Anuruttha was chosen as king of Luang Prabang, while the kingdom maintained tributary relations with Siam and China. Less than a year later Chao Nanthasen reported to Bangkok that Anuruttha was conspiring with Burma against Vientiane, and shortly thereafter received authorization to attack Luang Prabang. The Vientiane army laid siege to the city for two weeks before finally taking the city. Chao Anuruttha and his family were sent to Bangkok. However, Vientiane did not attempt to unite the two kingdoms, and only annexed the Hua Phan region. In 1794 the royal family of Luang Prabang sent emissaries to China for the release of Chao Anuruttha. The Chinese sent envoys to Bangkok via Hsen Wi and down the Nan river. They were granted an audience with Rama I and obtained Anuruttha's release. At about that time, Chao Nanthasen of Vientiane was recalled to Bangkok, where he was accused of conspiring with the ruler of Nakhon Phanom to revolt against the Siamese, and was executed.

King Anuruttha died in 1815, and in 1816 his son Chao Mangthaturath became king. King Anouvong then began campaign to at least win neutrality of Luang Prabang in event of conflict with Siam. In 1820 sent envoys to Chao Mangthaturath to propose the restoration of friendly relations and military alliance. Again in 1821 Anouvong sent another mission. The missions seem to have won Manthaturath's neutrality, for he did not report the incidents to Bangkok, and over the following years maintained envoys in both Bangkok and Vientiane to keep him informed of developments. 29 On the even of the rebellion, during the funeral of Rama II Mangthaturath conspicuously became a monk in honor of the Siamese king, Wyatt speculates that "it is possible that Chao Mangthaturath stayed in Bangkok at this time to avoid any involvement in Anouvong's forthcoming revolt."

The "five principalities" is a reference to Lan Na, and the five muang of Chiang Mai, Lampang, Nan, Phrae and Lamphun. In 1778 Lan Na was invaded by the Siamese. The King Kawila, had his ear cut off by Taksin because he protested the ill treatment of Chiang Mai's population by the invading Siamese officers. Under Rama I the rulers of Lan Na and the Lao kingdoms frequently fought alongside each other in wars against the Burmese. The unique closeness between Lan Na and the Lao kingdoms did not go unnoticed by British observers, as James Low reported:"Her (Siam's) neighbors to the North, the Laos of Chiang Mai and Lanchang, are ever ready to assert independence. It is impossible that the court of Bangkok should be blind to the nature of their political position."

In fact, when the British representative Henry Burney saw that Rama III was granting an audience to Lan Na rulers, he attempted to be present but was prohibited by the Bangkok court. The armies of Lan Na were reported by Siamese commanders to number 20,000 men. Nan alone 3500 men, three hundred elephants, 1,800 flintlocks and 420 kg of gunpowder. After the fall of Vientiane, Nan provided the Siamese with an army of 5,000, Chiang Mai 5,000, Lampang 5,000, Lamphun 2,000, Phrae 1,000, and Luang Prabang 2,711. One of Anouvong's major operational defeats was his inability to win the military support of Luang Prabang and Lan Na despite his repeated diplomatic attempts.

=== Vietnam ===
During the first half of the nineteenth century, the Vietnamese fought both diplomatically and militarily to consolidate their influence over the affairs of the Cambodian and Lao kingdoms, actively opposing Siamese influence in these areas. These events, particularly the Vietnamese occupation and annexation of Cambodia under Minh Mạng, were the most important developments in Nguyễn foreign policy before the confrontation with French imperialism.

In 1771 the Tây Sơn movement began which was initially directed at the Nguyễn, but later also brought down the Trịnh and the Lê dynasty itself. Phúc Ánh (who would reign as Emperor Gia Long, 1802–1820) led the counter-resistance movement which eventually defeated the Tây Sơn. During Nguyễn Phúc Ánh's campaign against the Tây Sơn, he obtained assistance from the newly established Chakri Dynasty in Siam, which sent a large expedition to the Mekong Delta to support him. The Siamese forces suffered a serious defeat at the hands of the Tây Sơn and behaved so badly that there was no question of their being asked for further assistance. Phúc Ánh then turned to the French for help and signed a treaty at Versailles in 1787 on behalf of the Nguyễn that promised French support in exchange for trade privileges. When in 1817, the French arrived to claim their privileges, Emperor Gia Long sent them away however his reputation suffered because of his initial collusion with the future colonial power.

The kingdom of Vientiane maintained a complex relationship with Vietnam. Some vassal towns had been paying equal tribute to Annam and Vientiane as long ago as 1780 and in 1790 Vientiane was attacked by a joint Vietnamese-Xiang Khouang force, which appears to have resulted in Chao Inthavong sending tribute to Vietnam as well. Vientiane forces cooperated with Gia-Long against the Tây Sơn rebellion, and in 1798 Vietnamese officers came to Vientiane to aid the Lao army, later accompanying it on missions against rebel remnants. Vientiane sent tribute missions to Gia Long in 1801 and 1802, and upon his accession, in 1804 Chao Anouvong notified the court at Huế. Anouvong sent tribute to Vietnam in 1808, 1811, 1814 and 1817. It appears possible, then, that Vientiane's relations with Vietnam were nearly as close as its relations with Siam.

Gia Long and his successors valued national unity and attempted to consolidate that unity through their administrative policies. The period from the last years of Gia Long's reign to the first years of Minh Mạng was one of consolidation and transition. Minh Mạng made a series of steps toward reinstating Confucianism at court and sought to reinforce his position as a serious famine occurred in 1824 and a number of small revolts broke out in the north in 1826–1827. In the south, Gia Long's mandarin Lê Văn Duyệt maintained an almost semi-independent fief, but also played an important part at Huế.

Minh Mạng was extremely cautious toward Siam during his early reign, a reflection of military parity between the two kingdoms and his own internal position at court between rival factions. Anouvong's rebellion and how Vietnam should react to it exacerbated the cleavages at court. Lê Văn Duyệt made a case for direct military support for Vientiane, "...According to my humble opinion, we do not get along well with the Siamese. If the kingdom of Ten Thousand Elephants (Vientiane) can exist as a protective cordon between us and Siam, our danger will decrease. If we want to maintain good relations with Siam, we will certainly lose the kingdom of Ten Thousand Elephants; if the country of Ten Thousand Elephants disappears, the kingdom of Siam will extend its power, and the situation will grow too dangerous for us. Weighing the pros and cons, we must help the kingdom of Ten Thousand Elephants against Siam. It is the best solution..." A similar case was made by the mandarin Hoang Kim Hoan, "...Even though Siam is equal to us in terms of power, must we remain with both our arms at rest? If we must wait for the Siamese to attack first before we counter-attack, the task will be extremely difficult. The best solution would be to launch a preventative attack before they tread on our soil, and this will be easier to achieve. The military mandarin has already been instructed to camp with troops at Nghe An. If Siam imprudently occupies the capital of the kingdom of Ten Thousand Elephants, we should not content ourselves to maintain friendly relations at any cost while forgetting the task of defending our country."

=== Great Britain ===
In the years preceding Anouvong's Rebellion Great Britain took an interest in Southeast Asia generally, and Siam in particular. The British East India Company founded Singapore as a free port in 1819. Singapore's commercial future was held, in part, to depend on the development of trade with the Malay Peninsula and Siam; and, in the eyes of Europeans, Siam's international trade was conducted in a monopolistic, anti-commercial, almost medieval fashion. The East India Company trade mission to Siam in 1821-1822 was the first major diplomatic contact between Siam and Great Britain in over a century. The aim of the mission, led by John Crawfurd, was to negotiate three proposals, re-enthronement of the sultan of Kedah, establishment of Anglo-Siamese trade, and the assistance of Siam against Burma.

The mission arrived in Bangkok in March 1822, and by June, George Finlayson, the naturalist to the mission, was already writing that "our Mission has failed." Crawfurd did not obtain any changes in Siamese trading regulations. All he managed to obtain was a promise that the British merchants would receive assistance from the Siamese Superintendent of Customs and that the duties and charges would not be increased in the future. Crawford wrote that, the only obstacle to profitable trade with Siam was the right of the Siamese government to buy and sell goods to foreign merchants at a price determined by the government before the foreign merchants were allowed to trade with anyone else. Crawfurd cited, the "arbitrary and unjust" government feared that attracting foreign merchants would lead to insurrections and rebellions of the Siamese. Crawfurd further noted the importance of the Lao states to the Siamese economy and the military state of readiness in Siam, "it is mostly from foreign trade, practised along the Menam river, that the kingdom receives its principal resources and the government's officials most of their income. It would need only one mounted gun, blocking the river, to completely stop all this trade and only two of these could destroy the Capital without any possible resistance on the part of the people." In response the Governor General of India, on 7 August 1823 noted, "Your estimation on Siamese military power and the indication you have given on their territory's vulnerable points deserve the utmost attention."

On 19 May 1822, Crawfurd met with Anouvong while he was in Bangkok, the nature of their discussion remains unknown. The mystery surrounding the meeting between Chao Anouvong and John Crawfurd is a major point of interest in the subsequent events from 1826 to 1828, according to Thai historiography Anouvong rebelled expecting a British attack on Siam. In any event, in 1822 Crawfurd was recalled. The Siamese were highly suspicious as Crawford's interpreters had been interrogated after he left for Singapore and noted, "…that this Crawfurd was a very clever and investigating man, and had come in order to view the Empire of Siam previous to the English fitting out an expedition with ships of war to come and conquer and seize on the Empire. And it was for this reason that Crawfurd, Dangerfield, the doctor and the military officer sounded the rivers and measured the size of the islands, small and great, and reckoned the population, and took counsel to do many other things to give cause of offence."

One possible reason that Crawfurd was recalled is that he expressly decided to refuse the Siamese permission to purchase fire-arms from the British. As noted by the Governor General of India, "…the concession on our part of permission to the Siamese Government to purchase fire arms…would to all appearance have induced the King to grant the freedom of commerce…which it was a special object of your Mission to obtain. It is not apparent that any very weighty reasons exist against granting the permission, and it is perhaps therefore to be regretted that you did not consider your instructions to authorize your entering more decidedly into the views of the Siamese Court on this point." Upon reaching Singapore, Crawfurd sent a dispatch on 9 September 1823 to Siam saying, "…there exists now no objection to the merchants of England supplying the Siamese Government with firearms." British arms merchants began a lucrative trade that continued through the 1830s. The arms, some of which had been resold from the Napoleonic Wars, provided firepower to Siam that was first used in 1827 against the Lao.

In May 1824, Britain had gone to war with Burma over Burmese attacks across the frontiers of India. Within a year, Siam was alarmed by rumors that the British were preparing a great expedition to seize Kedah after which they would proceed to attack Siam. Siam was sufficiently worried that they strengthened the defenses at the mouth of the Chaophraya River, stretching a great iron chain across the river. Moreover, conflict on the Malay Peninsula was increasing which also involved the British. In 1826, The East India Company sent Henry Burney who signed another agreement with Siam. The commercial terms were not much better than those obtained by Crawfurd but it did guarantee that Siam would not attack British territories on the Malay Peninsula. The First Anglo-Burmese War, ended in 1826 with a pyrrhic victory for the East India Company. The cost of war was almost £13 million and there were 15,000 casualties out of 40,000 British and Indian troops involved. The financial burden would contribute to the removal of all the East India Company's remaining monopolies in 1833.

== Prelude ==
=== Siamese-Vietnamese conflict in Cambodia ===
In Cambodia, as in the Lao states, Siam and Vietnam adopted a system of tributary diplomacy which the newly created dynasties in Bangkok and Huế used to legitimize themselves and restore their nations’ influence over bordering areas. In Cambodia, and the Lao states, their tributary networks overlapped. Cambodia was lightly populated, with less than half a million people, living predominately in small, isolated villages, scattered throughout the lower Mekong basin. Phnom Penh had only about 10,000 people, and Udong the royal capital had less. During the Thonburi period Taksin had invaded Cambodia three times to enforce the tributary relationship. The Vietnamese similarly invaded, forcing the Cambodian king to seek refuge in Bangkok. In exchange for Siamese support, Rama I installed its own local governorship over the northwestern areas of Cambodia. The region of Battambang, Siem Reap and the borderlands with Siam were under direct Siamese control. In 1805, Emperor Gia Long of Vietnam sent a ninety-eight man embassy and a letter offering to place Cambodia under his protection. Siam, realizing the importance of Cambodia as a buffer state, allowed the dual tributary relationship to continue, although factionalism at court was a major issue.

In 1809, King Ang Chan II of Cambodia refused to attend the cremation ceremony of Rama I, and executed two Cambodian officials who did attend as being too pro-Siamese. Ang Chan's brother Ang Snguon was openly pro-Siamese and had been appointed viceroy by Rama II in 1810. Snguon fled to the northwest of Cambodia and declared his support to Rama II in 1811. When the Vietnamese arrived with an army to support Ang Chan, the Siamese withdrew. In 1814 Siam took the opportunity to regain control over large areas of Cambodia including the Dangrek Mountains and Prohm-Tep, as well as the provinces of Mlou-Prey, Tonle Repou and Stung Treng.

Siam had accomplished two things; they had expanded their territory in Cambodia and had effectively blocked Mekong river trade from Lao areas with Cambodia and Vietnam. The Siamese also instituted a customs barrier on the land route between the Lao states and Cambodia through Khukhan. The 1814 trade restrictions were made to deliberately rechannel the flow of trade overland to Nakhon Ratchasima, and then onto Bangkok as a stopping point for trade in Singapore and China.

By the early 1820s Siam had lost much of its political influence in Cambodia. The victory of Gia Long had led to renewal of tributary ties between Phnom Penh and Huế, and an increasingly pro-Vietnamese policy on the part of the Cambodian king. Economically, until the mid-nineteenth century, international trade in Southeast Asia placed a high value on Lao forest products, however the region was heavily dependent international access to sea ports and European trade. The restrictions on international trade were a major impetus for Anouvong's rebellion. Anouvong may have believed that Siamese power was in decline, judged by the changing balance of power between Vietnam and Siam in Cambodia, regional dissatisfaction with Bangkok, and factionalism at the Bangkok court. Of these, the situation and similarity with Cambodia was the most significant from the Lao point of view.

=== Kingdom of Champasak and slave raids ===
In the aftermath of Siamese seizure of Vientiane in 1779, tens of thousands of Lao were forcibly moved to Siam as war prisoners (chaloei soek). The largest group were common folk, who were settled as virtual serfs in under-populated provinces and districts, as war slaves (that chaloei), to serve Thai elite beyond the limits of annual corvee labor that was imposed on Siam's freemen (phrai). Under traditional Siamese legal precepts all those captive people were considered royal or state slaves (that luang, kha luang). As property of the king, their status was, in effect, extra-legal. Unlike debt slaves, they lived in perpetual bondage.

The first official Siamese slave draft in peacetime occurred in 1791. In 1791, a millenarian movement among the Lao Theung people broke out against the Siamese, led by the rebel Sien Kaeo who had occupied Champasak. Under the direction of the Yokkrabat of Nakhon Ratchasima, the headmen of Ubon and Yasothon suppressed the rebellion of Sien Kaeo. Following the conflict together they moved to the upland areas of Champasak where they: "…apprehended members of the Jarai, Rhade, and Kasseng ethnic groups and others who lived on the eastern bank of the Mekong. They (the Siamese) caught and enslaved great numbers of these people, a condition that would continue indefinitely for them and their offspring. In this way, according to the chronicle, began the custom of catching and enslaving kha peoples." The tribal Lao Theung are commonly referred to by the derogatory name kha, which means slave or savage, in both Thai and Lao.

In 1819 another millenarian movement took place in Champasak, this time led by a man named Sakietgong, a Lao Theung kha Buddhist monk who claimed magical powers. The Siamese ordered Anouvong and Phraya Phromphakdi the Yokkrabat or deputy vice-governor of Nakhon Ratchasima (personal name Thong-in, who would later become Chaophraya Nakhon Ratchasima the governor of Nakhon Ratchasima during Anouvong's campaigns) to regain control of the area inhabited by Lao Theung. Both Anouvong and Phromphakdi perceived an opportunity to extend their power over Champasak.

Anouvong, relying on his reputation as a soldier for the Siamese in the wars with Burma, implied that Phraya Phromphakdi would not be able to maintain order within Champasak, and that it would be more stabilizing to appoint his son Nyo as king. Millenarian movements at the time were sweeping through highland tribal peoples in Cambodia, Xiang Khouang, and Vang Vieng. It was Anouvong who was able to suppress the movement led by Sakietgong, and the strategic importance of Champasak was at a high with tensions raised by a worsening situation in Cambodia and threats of Vietnamese intervention.

Prince Phithaksamontri, King Rama II's cousin, brother-in-law and general adviser to the Siamese government, opposed Nyo's appointment arguing it would extend Vientiane's influence to the south and make Anouvong a dangerous vassal. Prince Chetsadabodin (Rama III), on the other hand, reasoned that southern Laos must be strengthened, to prevent Vietnamese encroachment into the area as they had done in Cambodia, and supported the appointment of Nyo. With the support of Chetsadabodin, who was prime minister at the time, Anouvong was able to win the approval of Rama II.

For his part, Phraya Phromphakdi, under the pretext of installing a defensive post against Vietnam, established a base of operations at Muang Khong to capture ethnic Lao Theung. Those who were not captured were killed. Phromphakdi requested that the new king of Champasak, Chao Nyo, to capture slaves for him, a request he refused to meet. The refusal exacerbated the antagonism between the Lao and Phraya Phromphakdi, who used the opportunity to damage the reputation of the Lao, especially the Vientiane royalty at the Bangkok court.

=== Tattooing and corvee labor ===
Early in his reign, Rama III ordered a complete census of manpower throughout Siam to ensure every peasant performed his prescribed corvee labor, followed by a comprehensive land survey for tax purposes. Rama III decreed that tattooing be extended to the population in most of the Lao states, their inhabitants were considered to be under the jurisdiction of Siam, not of the Lao kingdoms and principalities that were tributaries of Siam. The tattoo contained the census number and village of each inhabitant. Siam's extensive tattooing campaign, which extended to Lao on both the "west" and "east" banks of the Mekong, had an economic aim: to introduce the Siamese fiscal administration into Lao areas. Tribute and tax payments were calculated on the basis of the adult male population registered by tattooing. Rama III's policy of incorporation had the unintended consequence of making Vientiane the rallying point of all opponents to the tattooing policy. Even the former pro-Siamese elite, such as that of Kalasin, and Khmer areas such as Khukhan, would declare their allegiance to Anouvong during the coming rebellion. The tattooing policy had alienated a number of subjects in the tributary states and split the population into two distinct camps: those who agreed with Bangkok and those who strongly disagreed. The latter were automatically classified as rebels, which meant they were associated with Anouvong and the Lao. As noted by Gesick,"The tributary rulers who felt their autonomy was being threatened were faced with an unpleasant choice. If they behaved as faithful tributaries, conforming to behavior as it was defined by the Thai, they tacitly acquiesced to the erosion of their own position. If they refused to perform the duties assigned to them by their Thai suzerain or showed reluctance, they ran the risk of endangering their security by bringing their loyalty into question."

The conscription of freemen (phrai) into corvee labor projects was a common aspect of Siamese administration. However, the Lao were often employed in the most difficult or life-threatening construction projects. For example, in 1813, Lao workers were employed in the construction of a dam at Ang Thong, the highest section of the Bang Kaeo canal, in order to redirect the Chaophraya River. Lao were also impressed to build the Phra Samut Chedi, located on an island at the mouth of the Chaophraya river, and to construct defensive works in the same area to protect against the potential of an attack by the British fleet.

=== Funeral of Rama II ===
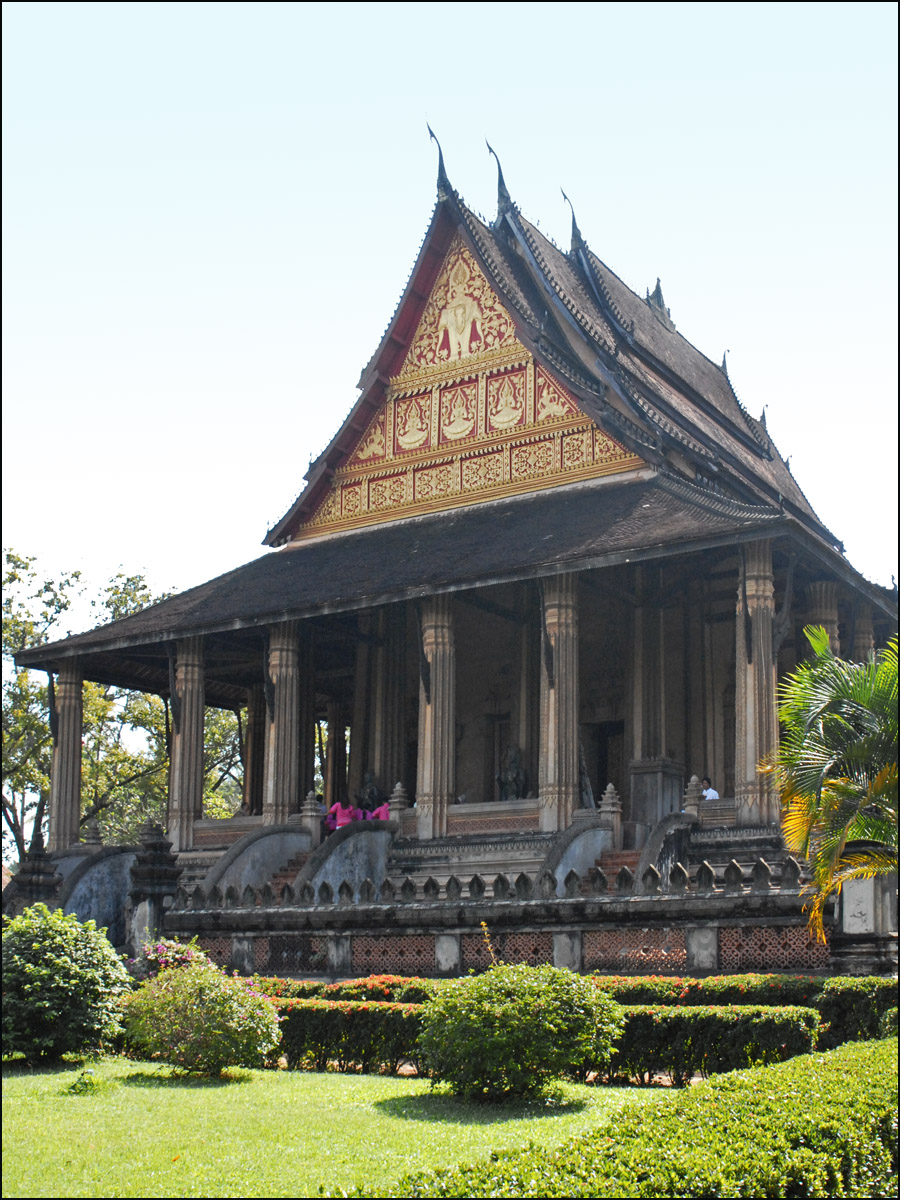
Haw Phra Kaew, Vientiane. Former Royal Temple of the Emerald Buddha.

In 1825, Anouvong and Manthaturath, as vassal kings came to Bangkok with their respective court retinues to attend the cremation ceremonies for Rama II who had died in 1824. Manthaturat ingratiated himself with the Siamese by entering the monastic order as a sign of respect. As Anouvong was en route to Bangkok, Rama III requisitioned Anouvong's entourage to provide laborers to fell sugar palm trees which were needed for defensive works. The trees needed to be transported from Suphanburi to Samut Prakan, and overseeing the work was the Vientiane crown prince the Ratsavong Ngau. According to different accounts, the crown prince was beaten during the undertaking. Anouvong for his part, met with village elders along the way and requested that they stockpile rice, and train and arm villagers.

Upon his return to Vientiane, Anouvong convened a war council and drafted a list of demands. Anouvong sought the return of Khieokhom (not Duangkham as asserted by the Siamese courtier and historian Thiphakorawong) his sister, who was taken in 1779. Though she was to be delivered to Taksin, she was raped by Chakri, Taksin's commander and chief, on the way to Thonburi. When Taksin learned this, he exiled her and her handmaids to Saraburi, along with the Lao families forced to leave Vientiane. She was repatriated in 1827 after a raid conducted by Ratsavong Ngau on Saraburi, Khieokhom was later recaptured by the Siamese armies at Pak Ngum after the fall of Vientiane. Another demand entailed the return of a troop of actresses, who were members of the theatrical group that Rama II asked Anouvong to bring to perform in Bangkok, but were made to enter Rama III's harem. Two additional demands are noted in some sources, one is for the repatriation of the Lao in Saraburi, and the other is for the return of the Phra Kaeo, or Emerald Buddha, which had become the palladium of the Chakri dynasty, but which had been taken in 1779 from Vientiane and remained a powerful symbol of dispossession. Both demands had been made by king Nanthasen, thirty five years earlier, before he was executed for conspiring with the Nakhon Phanom to rebel. The refusal of so unreasonable a request was a foregone conclusion; it was made merely for the sake of obtaining a useful pretext for renouncing Siamese suzerainty.

Raxavong Ngau left Bangkok for Vientiane on 14 September 1826 with letters from Rama III addressed to Anouvong. The letters informed Anouvong he was to prepare to come to Bangkok if needed, and contained a copy of the Burney Treaty that Siam was concluding with the British. The last article of the treaty contained the following: "The Siamese shall settle every matter within the Siamese boundaries according to their own will and customs."(C Moor 1837, 218) In December, the Ratsavong arrived as did officials from Lomsak, Sakon Nakhon, Kalasin, Xiang Khouang, Nakhon Phanom, and the resident envoy from Luang Prabang to plan the operational phase of the rebellion. A Vietnamese envoy was also present, and conveyed Emperor Minh Mạng's desire to oppose any further escalation with the Siamese.

== Lao offensives (January–February 1827) ==
=== Lao advance ===
At the beginning of hostilities, Lao forces totaled no more than 14,000 men. After the forced evacuation of the Khorat Plateau, the army could expand, replenishing itself from ethnic Lao evacuated to Vientiane, to its maximum size of 25,000 men, including the forces from Xiang Khouang, Lomsak and Saraburi. At the height of the rebellion Anouvong, assisted by Chao Sutthisan, led 10,000 men with 1,200 flintlocks, Chao Upparat Tissa commanded 10,000 men, 100 elephants, and 30 horses, and advance forces were led by Ratsavong Ngau and consisted of roughly 5,000 men with 500 flintlocks, 400 elephants, and 200 horses. Headmen at various villages throughout the region also commanded local militias including Chao Thong at Suvannaphum, and Phya Sai at Lomsak. King Nyo also led an estimated 2,000 men from Champasak to Ubon. The Lao were poorly equipped with no artillery and only one or two guns for every ten men, swords, lances, and axes would have armed many of the remaining troops. At the end of hostilities Sakdiphonlasep reported that when Vientiane fell, he counted only nine able-bodied men existed for every two or three hundred women and children.

The first priority for Anouvong's campaign was to regain control of the Lao under Siamese jurisdiction in order to expand his recruitment and supply base. To accomplish this, he had to take control of the Khorat Plateau, the key to which was the garrison at Nakhon Ratchasima. The plan was to seize the Khorat Plateau and its major towns, evacuate the Lao at Saraburi, gather the ethnic Lao to Vientiane and conduct a scorched earth policy along the way. Moving rapidly, Anouvong hoped to persuade the kingdoms of Luang Prabang and Lan Na to join his side, while Siamese concern for the potential of British or Vietnamese involvement would delay their response.

Thai chronicles portrayed Prince Chao Upahat Tissa, younger brother of Anouvong as being reluctant to join his brother's cause. Prince Tissa first led the Lao armies to secure position in the Khorat Plateau, where the Sak Lek or conscription tattooing was undergoing. The chaomuangs of the Khorat Plateau faced tough decisions; whether to join Anouvong in his campaigns or to be faithful to Siam. The governor of Sakon Nakhon allowed Tissa to march through his town, the action that cost him his life when Phraya Ratchasuphawadi later found him guilty of betrayal and had him executed. In December 1826, Uparat Tissa led his forces to pursue Siamese officials actively engaged in tattooing the local population and take the town of Kalasin. Phraya Chaisunthon the Lao governor of Kalasin refused to join Prince Tissa and was executed by the Lao prince. Governors of Roi-et and Suvannaphum played the power balance by giving their female relatives to be consorts of Prince Tissa in order to please him without alienating Siam.

From Vientiane, Anouvong dispatched his son Prince Ratsavong Ngau ahead as vanguard to Nakhon Ratchasima. Ratsavong Ngau reached Nakhon Ratchasima in January 1827. Chaophraya Nakhon Ratchasima Thong-in the governor of Nakhon Ratchasima and Phraya Palat vice-governor (personal name Thongkham) had earlier marched their armies from Nakhon Ratchasima to Khukhan in order to settle the conflicts between Phraya Kraiphakdi Boonchan and a relative of Xiengkhan. This left Phraya Phromphakdi, the Yokkrabat, in charge of Nakhon Ratchasima. Phromphakdi went to meet Ratsavong Ngau in the outskirts of the city. Ratsavong told Phromphakdi that he arrived on the orders of the Bangkok court to employ the troops against the British. Phromphakdi and the Siamese court were unaware of Anouvong's intentions at this point and Phromphakdi gave Ratsavong rice supplies. Prince Ratsavong Ngau then proceeded to occupy the Dong Phaya Fai pass and sent his forces to Saraburi. Phraya Suraratchavong, the Lanna governor of Saraburi, was brought to meet with Prince Ratsavong at Dong Phaya Fai. Ratsavong convinced the governor to join his cause, telling him that Bangkok was going to fall to the British. The governor of Saraburi then complied and the Lao inhabitants of Saraburi migrated to join Prince Ratsavong Ngau.

In mid-January, Anouvong led his forces to take Nakon Ratchasima without resistance, while the forces of the Siamese governor were campaigning in Cambodia. Ratsavong Ngau gathered troops from Lomsak and Chaiyaphum before heading to Saraburi to evacuate the Lao population. A fourth force, under Chao Nyo marched from Champasak to Ubon.

The Lao advance was made under fog of misinformation, insisting that the Lao were advancing on Nakon Ratchasima and other towns in order to assist Bangkok in repelling a joint Burmese-British attack. Chao Tissa advanced from Kalasin for Roi-Et, Yasothon, and Suvannaphum. As Tissa made his advance, the leader of Khukhan imprisoned the Siamese officials in charge of tattooing, and declared his allegiance to Anouvong. Tissa then organized the evacuation of the population from Ubon, Suvannaphum, Kalasin, Yasothon, Roi-Et, Khon Kaen and Nakon Ratchasima. In response from the support of Khukhan, the Siamese would send part of the second army to the border area between Cambodia and Khorat to monitor the situation.

==== Diplomatic advances ====
In Nakhon Ratchasima, Anouvong ordered the city defenses destroyed, and remained five weeks with repeated attempts to find the Yokkrabat based on conflicting reports. Anouvong was also engaged in diplomatic efforts to exhort Luang Prabang and Lan Na to send troops and much needed supplies. Anouvong sent an embassy of Lao from Vientiane and Saraburi to Chiang Mai, Lampang, Lamphun, Nan and Phrae, Siamese spies reported to Bangkok: "Anou is exhorting the governors of Nan and Phrae to attack with armies, moving them toward Phichai. And he requests that Lampang, Chiang Mai, and Lamphun attack and move toward Tak, meeting the Nan-Phrae armies at Chainat. Anou planned to have Chao Ratsavong attack via Saraburi. Anou indicated that Nan-Phrae need not join this action if they did not wish, but that Vientiane and Vietnam would succeed easily."

According to the Siamese viceroy, throughout the war the rulers of Lan Na and Luang Prabang were deliberately slow in responding to Siamese requests, "If the royal armies could not conquer Vientiane, none of the five Phung Dam (Lan Na) or Luang Prabang contingents would appear at the royal camp…These principalities would simply confine themselves to waiting at their respective borders in order to seize peasants, elephants, and other things…We must, however, act purposefully in concert with these towns and say to them that they take too much time to send their troops and that the royal armies have already taken Vientiane. They must be punished."

In April, 1827, the leader of Nan sent a personal emissary, Saen Luang Thipsomsak, to open communication with Anouvong through Lomsak. Siamese spies reported, "Anou wrote to Nan that Nan could take those families that wished to migrate to Nan from Muang Nan Pat, Muang Ham, Muang Kaen Thao, and all the other towns on the western bank of the Mekong, while all the towns on the eastern bank belonged to Vientiane. Nan officials then carried off the Nam Pat families." The leader of Nan made his officials pledge allegiance to Anouvong twice, once at Muang Nam Pat and again at Ban Chieo.

Anouvong made more direct overtures to Luang Prabang in February 1827. Manthathurath received an embassy from Anouvong to convince Luang Prabang that Anouvong had good reason for occupying the Khorat region; to ask Luang Prabang to accept repatriated Lao originally from Luang Prabang; and lastly to send rice and supplies to Anouvong in support of the rebellion. According to the Luang Prabang chronicle, Manthathurath made it known that he would side with the victor of the conflict.

=== Battle of Samrit Fields ===
The Battle of Samrit Fields, as it known in Thai historiography, is influenced by the historian Chaophraya Thiphakorawong's chapter, "Lady Mo's struggle with Anou's army." The Thai version of the battle describes an act of resistance by the Khorat population at Thong Samrit, and features prominently the legendary heroine "Lady Mo." According to Prince Damrong, "Lady Mo was clever and was able to plead for a delay while the families were gathered at Thung Samrit, When (those gathered) were sufficiently strong in number, both men and women were able to seize the arms of the Vientiane soldiers. (They then) attacked the soldiers, killed many of them, and forced the others to flee. Then the families co-operated in establishing a military encampment at Thung Samrit." In recognition of her role, King Rama III vested Lady Mo with the title of Thao Suranari.

The Lao chronicles refer to the Battle as Mun Kheng, after the name of the camp on the shore of the Lam Sung Krai river. The population of Nakhon Ratchasima, had largely been evacuated with the remaining population being escorted and guarded by Lao police. In the Phimai region, the evacuees were joined with Phraya Plat, the deputy governor of Khorat, who organized a resistance which planned to join with the approaching Siamese army. Phraya Plat went to Anouvong's camp under the ruse he was pledging loyalty. He then argued that the evacuees were exhausted, and that he needed knives, axes, and ten flintlocks to hunt for food. Phraya Plat returned to his men, where they killed the forty Lao guards. Anouvong then sent a reconnaissance unit to investigate the killing of the Lao guards; they too were ambushed and killed. Anouvong then ordered Chao Sutthisan into the area with 2,000 men armed with 200 firearms, with the order to "kill all the men and transport only the women to Vientiane." The Lao camped at Mun Kheng on 21 March 1827. Near dawn the Siamese commenced an attack that went on until evening and won.

== Siamese offensives (March–May 1827) ==
Historians do not have access to numbers regarding Siamese armies’ strength and weapons for the campaign. However three armies were mobilized to suppress the rebellion. Viceroy Sakdiphonlasep was the supreme commander of the campaign, and commanded the first army whose goal was to engage Anouvong and capture Vientiane. The second army was led by Krommamun Surinthontherak, and was headquartered in Prachinburi. The second army advanced to the Khorat region through Chong Gua Taek pass on 29 March 1827, with orders to pacify the region and restrain Chao Tissa and King Nyo's forces protecting Sakdiphonlasep's right flank. The first corps of the second army was led by Bodindecha, and consisted of roughly 8,000 men, with another 1,300 men under separate command as scouts. After it arrived in Khorat, the main body of the second army was recalled to Bangkok at Samut Prakan, in order to protect the capital from the British fleet. A third army, was led by Chaophraya Aphaiphuthon, which mobilized in two parts gathering at Phetchabun and marching to Lomsak, which had sided with Anouvong.

=== Battle of Lomsak ===
On 21 March 1827 Ratsavong Ngau arrived at the town of Lomsak, with 5,000 men armed with 450 rifles and one mortar. A fortress had been erected for the defense of the town, which was a strategic point where both the first and third Siamese armies were to join. Two camps were established to protect the routes coming from the Chaophraya valley and the route to Nong Bua Lam Phu. On 26 March 1827 both camps were attacked by the Siamese, the Lao ordered the evacuation of the nearby villages then burned all the houses and granaries in the area. Chaophraya Aphaiphuthon, commanding the Siamese third army, initiated an attack on Lomsak with 12,000 men. Lomsak fell on 2 April 1827, and the town was burned. The Siamese third army then pursued Ratsavong Ngau on his retreat from Lomsak and a third battle ensued at Ban Rae, in Loei territory.

=== Battle of Loei ===
Ratsavong Ngau reached the Lao fortress at Paeng Hak, situated on the plain of Muang Loei which was protected by mountains. Anouvong sent 2,000 men to reinforce the forces at Loei, which arrived on 20 April. On 27 April, Chaophraya Aphaiphuthon arrived at Loei from Lomsak. Also on the field were representatives from Lan Na and Luang Prabang, which still had yet to openly commit forces to either Anouvong or the Siamese, but were marching to the area. The Battle of Loei lasted for two days and a night, at which point Ratsavong Ngau fell back to a position on Siang Khan on the eastern shore of the Mekong to protect Lao on the west bank. If the forces of Lan Na or Luang Prabang had committed to Anouvong, their assistance never materialized. Ratsavong Ngau sent a request for additional reinforcements to Anouvong who tersely replied, "Where does he want me to get them, particularly now that Chiang Mai is going to launch an attack against me?" Ratsavong Ngau then withdrew his troops to reinforce those at Thong Sompoi. As a consequence of the defeat at the Battle of Loei, the Siamese third army was able to reinforce the first army in preparation for an assault on Nong Bua Lam Phu.

=== Battle of Nong Bua Lamphu ===
Nong Bua Lamphu is a settlement near the modern city of Udon Thani, during the Lan Xang era, it was an important fortified outpost city where Lao forces in 1571 successfully beat back attacking Siamese and Burmese troops. By the eighteenth century Nong Bua Lamphu was significant enough to be customarily entrusted to the crown princes of the Kingdom of Vientiane. Under order from Anouvong, and built by Phagna Narin and Chao Sutthisan, a 1,200 by 620 meter fortress was erected with log walls four meters high, which contained three bastions and a surrounding moat. The design of the fortress was based on one in Chiang Mai that had been built in 1802 to oppose the Burmese.

The Lao defenders numbered 2,300, armed with 190 flintlocks led by Phaya Narin. On 3 May 1827 the Siamese first army arrived at Nong Bua Lamphu and 20,000 troops encircled the fort. On the morning of 6 May, the Siamese began their final assault, as the fort fell Phaya Narin and his nephew were captured. After the Siamese forces interrogated Phaya Narin, they gave him the opportunity to join the Siamese army with equal status in exchange for his submission to Sakdiphonlasep, due to his bravery and military prowess in defending the fort. According to the 16 June Siamese field staff report, "Ai Phagna Narinthon (Phaya Narin) as well as his nephews still remain faithful to Ai Anou of Vientiane. Therefore, we have decided to slice them alive, to saw their heads into four parts, to saw off their ears, their hands, and their feet, to behead them and then expose their remains at Ban (Takutchork) in order that all the chiefs of the Lao will take them as an example."

=== Battles of Khao San Pass and Sompoi ===
Two forts were erected to guard the Khao San pass, leading to Viantiane, under the command of Sutthisan and the Chao Muang of Khon Kaen. Ratsavong Ngau and his troops were stationed to protect the west flank, and Chao Tissa and his troops were stationed to protect the east at Nong Han with 4,000 troops to counter any movement by Bodindecha and the Siamese second army. The tactical strategy was to isolate the first army by drawing them into the difficult mountainous terrain. The Siamese assessed the ground, and developed a strategy to draw the defenders from their entrenched positions. The Siamese deployed 3,000 troops in six groups to surround the village of Sompoi, the Lao mounted an attack but quickly retreated under artillery fire. The Lao regrouped and surrounded the Siamese troops, the Siamese then sprang their trap from the tree line and surrounded the Lao. The Lao deployed their elephant cavalry and the battle lasted until evening. At night the Lao moved to surround the Siamese.

The next morning on 12 May the Siamese attempted to force their way to reinforce their troops, the Lao deployed all their operational forces in the area. On the morning of 13 May, the Siamese forces broke rank and retreated to Nong Bua Lamphu, the pursuing Lao were stopped by artillery fire and their commander Phraya Kongkeo of Saraburi was killed in action. The Lao occupied the high ground of Song Sanom above Nong Bua Lamphu, the Siamese attacked that night to dislodge the four camps but were unsuccessful. Also on 13 May, Sakdiphonlasep aware of the ongoing situation left from Nakhon Ratchasima to establish camp at Lam Pa Chi to better reconnoiter the combat zone. Reinforcements and munitions were expedited by forced march.

On 14 May Siamese forces attempted to force their way onto the Thong Sompoi plain. On 21 May Sakdiphonlasep took up camp at Nong Bua Lamphu. On May 23, Chao Tissa was outflanked at Nong Han, and the Siamese blocked any Lao retreat. At the same time the third Siamese army engaged Ratsavong Ngau's men forcing them to fall back. The Lao resistance was stiff, and it was not until 25 May that the Siamese reported to Sakdiphonlasep that they had captured the Khao San pass.

=== The fall of Vientiane ===
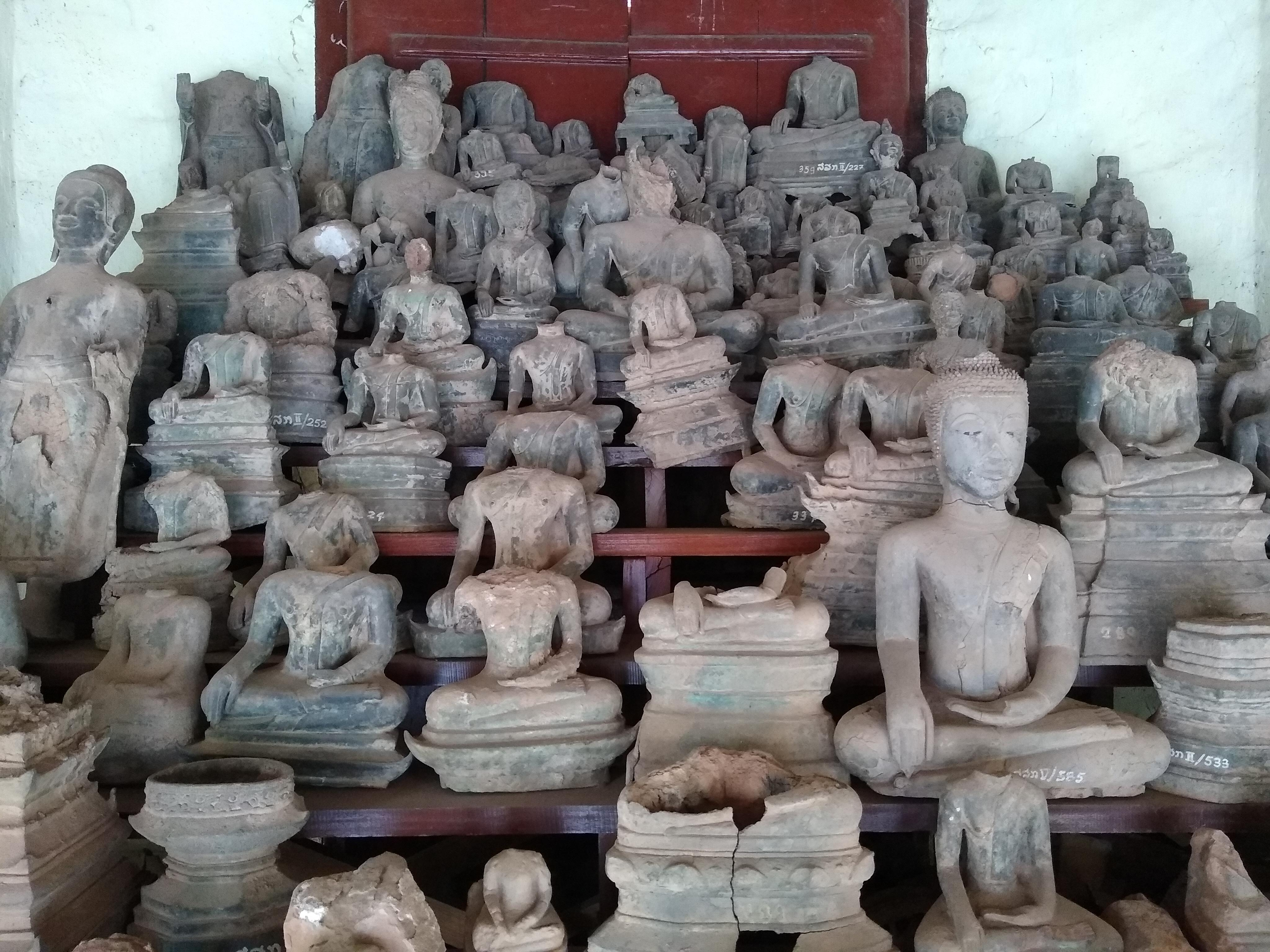
Buddha statues from Vientiane, damaged in the invasion

The Lao defeat at the Khao San pass left Vientiane exposed, Anouvong returned to organize a hasty evacuation of the capital and to establish two camps further south at Tha Sida and Nakhon Phanom. The Phra Bang and other precious items were hid in the Phu Khao Khwai cave, sixty kilometers from Vientiane. Chao Noi was tasked with transporting the royal family and treasury to Xiang Khouang and departed on 22 May. Anouvong and his men also departed by boat to Nakhon Phanom, while the battle at Khao San pass was still ongoing, leaving the capital lightly defended. On 26 May the Siamese forces occupied Vientiane. By 8 June, Sakdiphonlasep had established camp on the opposite shore of the Mekong from Vientiane. Rama III issued firm instruction to Sakdiphonlasep that Vientiane was to be totally destroyed in order to serve as an example to all of the fate of disloyal vassals. According to Rama III, this was the second time Vientiane had rebelled (he counted Siribunnyasan's resistance in 1778) and as a consequence the city was no longer to be allowed to exist, that is, not only was the capital to be physically destroyed, but the identity of Vientiane as a distinctive country (ban meuang) was to be completely expunged. A Lao officer reported to Hue the destruction of Vientiane that followed:

"Vang Na (Sakdiphonlasep) ordered all the inhabitants to evacuate the capital (Vientiane) and had all the houses set afire, as well as the palaces of the king and everything else within Vientiane. Everything belonging to the Phi Tao (elites) and to the population has been burnt. Places other than Vientiane that were densely inhabited were also ignited, such as Muang Tha Bo, Nong Bo, Nong Khai, Pha Cat, Thiap Ma Ni, Ba Xuy, Hoi Lung (near the town of Phonphisai where the summer palace of the king of Vientiane was located).

Following the destruction of the capital, the surrounding area was to be depopulated, its people moved to Siamese territory, and all its valuable and sacred objects were to be taken to Bangkok. (Note: Among them were three Buddha images cast in bronze by King Setthathirath, said to be made in honor of his three daughters. The images were called Pha Serm, Pha Suk and Pha Sai. The Pha Serm was taken by the Siamese in 1828 and later installed in Wat Phathumwanaram, Bangkok. The Pha Suk, sank in the Mekong while Siamese troops were ferrying it across the river. The Pha Sai was taken to Nongkhai and installed at Wat Photichai.) In addition, Rama III ordered a chedi memorial to be erected across the river at Phan Phao commemorating the suppression of Anouvong's rebellion, to be adorned with one of Vientiane's own most revered Buddha images, the Pha Serm. However, the Siamese army was unable to complete all of these activities that year. On arrival they found the city virtually deserted, and the troops faced difficulty finding enough Lao commoners to assist in destroying the city's walls and buildings.

The Siamese also initiated their own misinformation campaign, as the Lao had at the beginning of the conflict, leaving the palaces of Chao Tissa and Ratsavong Ngau untouched the Siamese further sent out official dispatches indicating that both were collaborating with Siam to weaken any remaining Lao resistance. Search parties were sent to capture any remaining members of the royal family and nobles in the area.

Bodindecha was tasked with the pacification and reorganization of the Lao states, and was named general overseer of Vientiane, Champassak, and the Khorat Plateau, while Phraya Phetphichai and Phraya Sombattiban were placed in charge of Lan Na, Lomsak, Loei, and Luang Prabang. Lao towns throughout the region fought in skirmishes to resist Siamese deportations.

== Southern theater ==
The operational objective of the second Siamese army commanded by Bodindecha, was to engage Chao Tissa and Chao Nyo's forces in the south of the Khorat Plateau. Phraya Ratchanikun led part of the Siamese army, while Bodindecha made a large bend to the north to destroy communication lines and cut off Chao Tissa's path toward Vientiane. Bodindecha then turned south to join pursuing Chao Nyo's troops as part of a three-pronged attack. Lao forces were located along an arc running from west to east along the line from Phimai to Khon Kaen to Udon. The objective of these forces was to protect Ubon and Champassak from Siamese attack. Chao Tissa had 1,000 troops stationed at Roi Et, Suvannaphum was lightly defended by local militia. Chao Thong and Chao Nyo were concentrated at Sompoi, in the vicinity of Sisaket, with a force of 5,000 to 6,000.

In May Phraya Ratchanikun and his forces, and troops of the governor of Nakhon Ratchasima, had advanced to Sangkha, where they threatened Chao Nyo's forces camping at Sisaket. The Siamese first attacked Suvannaphum, to rebuild supplies and units that were engaged at Thong Samrit. It was at this time that Bodindecha dispatched a letter to Chao Tissa which stated,

When Chao Maha Upparat (Tissa) came down to Krungthep (Bangkok), he informed us that Anouvong would revolt. That has finally occurred. Now, I (Bodindecha) am on my way and want Chao Maha Upparat to attack Vientiane so as to enable the central army (Bowen's forces) to progress with ease. I myself will direct my army to enhance (Tissa's deeds).

Some Thai and Lao historiography attribute the failure of the Lao insurrection to Chao Tissa's betrayal claiming that he revealed the Lao timetable and strategies to the Siamese. The theory that Tissa colluded with the enemy is supported by Chao Tissa's retreat from Yasothon to Nong Han after Bodindecha's intervention, and by the above letter. It is possible, but Chao Tissa's movements and fact that Bodindecha used a similar tactic by authoring dubious letters in 1837 to pit the Vietnamese against their own commanders, suggest it was part of a misinformation campaign to divide and weaken Lao resistance.

Anouvong ordered Chao Tissa to take command of the Sakon Nakhon to Nong Han zone, and the area from Suvannaphum to Sisaket was to be under the command of Chao Thong. Kalasin was a stopping point, Bodindecha sent Phraya Suphan to pursue Chao Tissa whose troops engaged with the Siamese. On 2 May, Bodindecha travelled from Roi Et to Yasothon. A battle ensued at Yasothon that lasted for two days, as recalled by Bodindecha,"The upparat and ratsavong of Yasothon vigorously defended their town. It was only after two days of struggle that I could capture the camp of Yasothon. The Siamese soldiers captured the families of the upparat and the ratsavong (of Yasothon), who had willingly taken the side of Chao Anouvong. The members of these two families totaled 160 persons. Phraya Ratchasuphawadi (Bodindecha) ordered these 160 persons, who were the Lao prisoners in revolt, burned alive."

On 21 May, the governor of Khorat arrived in Ubon and joined the Siamese to take the city. Chao Nyo fled back to Champassak, where they discovered the city was on fire having been attacked by Bodindecha. The dispossessed local nobility pursued Chao Nyo, capturing him at a Lao Theung village near the source of the Se Bang Liang river. According to the Champassak chronicles, "Nyo, his family, his goldsmiths and his blacksmiths were conducted to Bangkok." For the capture of Chao Nyo, Chao Hui was appointed as the local ruler of Champassak. The former capital of Champassak was destroyed, and would be referred to as Muang Kao or "Old Town," while a new Champassak town was built further away.

Following the destruction of Champassak, Bodindecha dispatched troops to take Muang Khong, the largest fortified island on the Mekong River, two hundred kilometers south of Champassak. Bodindecha moved his main forces north to Nakhon Phanom, where he hoped to catch Anouvong and Ratsavong Ngau. Bodindecha recalled in his memoirs that as he went to Vientiane to report to Sakdiphonlasep the end of his campaign on the Khorat Plateauand the arrival of Vietnamese envoys, that he instead encountered Chao Tissa, who not only surrendered but also defected. Other Siamese and Lao accounts simply state that he was captured.

== The king Anouvong's refuge in Vietnam ==
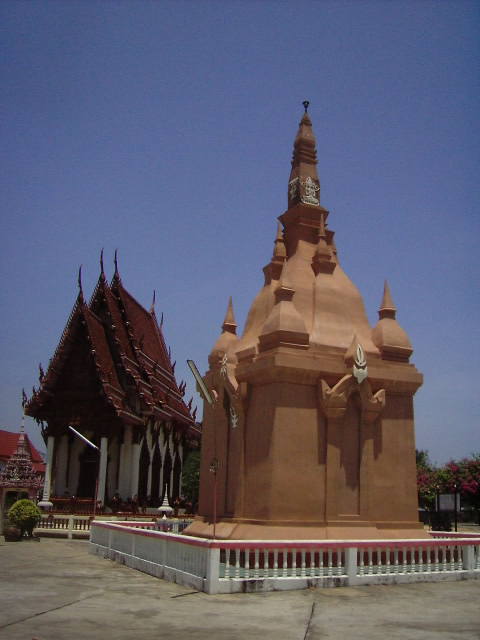
Victory Chedi, Wat Tung Sawang Chaiyaphum

On 30 May 1827, the Vietnamese recorded that Chao Anouvong and his entourage arrived at the border town of Quy Hop seeking asylum in Vietnam. The Vietnamese Emperor Minh Mạng was caught in a politically delicate situation as he sought to maintain the autonomy and prestige of his country, while assisting a dependent kingdom that had agitated Vietnam's regional rival Siam. Anouvong was not immediately welcomed and waited several weeks while the court in Hue debated the course of action. It was finally decided that Anouvong would be allowed to seek refuge, and a ceremony was organized at Tam Dong by the governor of Nghe-An to accept Anouvong. The Siamese mobilized at Mukdahan, on the west bank of the Mekong, to attempt to capture Anouvong and the governor of Lakhon. To prevent an escalation, Emperor Minh Mạng dispatched a mission to the Siamese stating that any attempt to capture Anouvong on Vietnamese territory would result in Vietnamese military response.

In the power vacuum from collapse of Vientiane, Luang Prabang sent an army to seize Muang Soui en route to Xiang Khouang, both former dependencies of the Kingdom of Vientiane. In response, Chao Noi of Xiang Khouang declared himself a willing vassal of Vietnam in exchange for protection. Muang Phuan became the Vietnamese province of Tran Ninh, Chao Noi received the rank of Phong Nga, and was allowed to maintain his hereditary position. Informed that Vietnam would now protect its vassals, Luang Prabang retreated. By February 1828, most Siamese operational forces had returned to Bangkok. Rama III was deeply unsatisfied with the situation, Anouvong had not been captured, Vientiane had not been completely razed, and Vietnamese intervention was a serious concern.

== Second Phase (August–December 1828) ==
In July 1828, Anouvong and Ratsavong Ngau began to plan to recapture Vientiane from the Siamese. On 1 August, Anouvong and Ratsavong Ngau entered Vientiane with 1,000 supporters, including 80 Vietnamese observers, and fortified themselves at Wat Haw Phra Keo. There are various versions of what happened next. According to the Siamese version, the Lao massacred the garrison and when the Siamese sent reinforcements to Done Chan Island, Anouvong and Ratsavong Ngau preemptively attacked. On 2 August, Bodindecha arrived with 3,000 troops opposite Vientiane. In the Lao version, the Vietnamese delegation proposed that Anouvong be reinstated as a tributary to Hue and Bangkok. Anouvong became furious at discovering the memorial chedi erected by Rama III, destroyed it and went on to attack the garrison. The Vietnamese version is different, where the Siamese learn that Anouvong has returned to Vientiane, the garrison seized the rice stocks and refused to supply Anouvong and his detachment. Shooting broke out and several Siamese soldiers were killed. Whatever the details, the Siamese withdrew further south to gather troops.

=== Battle of Bok Wan ===
18 October 1828, a final battle took place at Bok Wan, near Nongkhai. Ratsavong Ngau and Bodindecha engaged in hand-to-hand combat during the struggle. Thrown from his horse by Ratsavong Ngau's lance stroke, Bodindecha lay on the ground with the lance planted in his stomach. The Ratsavong jumped from his horse, with one hand on his lance and in the other his sword. When he raised his sword to finish Bodindecha, Luang Phiphit, Bodindecha's half brother, ran in to take the strike in his place and was killed. Ratsavong Ngau raised his sword to strike again, but was shot and wounded by Siamese soldiers. Ratsavong Ngau was carried off the battlefield, but survived. Ratsavong Ngau took refuge in caves near the Sekong region, bordering Cambodia. Siamese reports during the reigns of Rama IV and Rama V mention rumors that Ratsavong Ngau was leading revolts in the region after 1829, and became a source of legend.

Siamese forces entered Vientiane again and completely destroyed the city. The population which had returned was deported. Chao Anouvong escaped fleeing toward Xiang Khouang, but was either caught or was handed over by Chao Noi. Chao Noi was later killed by the Vietnamese under that pretext. The Siamese sent Anouvong with his family and supporters to Bangkok. Anouvong and many members of his household, including several of his wives and a number of his 23 children, were tortured and executed in Bangkok. Included in the booty brought back to Bangkok in 1828 was the Phra Bang Buddha image. As a demonstration to the Lao, Rama III had the Phra Bang image installed in a special pavilion at Wat Samploem, near the site of Anuvong's execution.

== Aftermath ==
=== Demographics ===
Haw Phra Kaew in Vientiane in ruins claimed by forest vines, depicted by Louis Delaporte, the French Explorer of Mekong, in 1867.

The most lasting legacy of Anouvong's Lao Rebellion was the impact of the forced population transfers of ethnic Lao throughout the Mekong watershed area. In the modern era, the fivefold disparity between the populations of Laos and Thailand's Isan region are a result of the deportations in the aftermath of the Anouvong rebellion. By conservative estimates, in the first three decades following the conquest of Vientiane, at least 100,000 Lao were forced to leave the eastern bank of the Mekong and to resettle in territories on the western bank of the river or in the interior. The Khorat Plateau region became more and more densely populated by the end of the nineteenth century. The number of mueang (towns) increased from 33 in 1826 to 54 in 1840. Their number reached 70 by 1860 and another 20 years later surpassed the 100 mark. In some cases, settlement activities created tensions or even violent conflicts among neighboring towns which tried to maximize the manpower under their direct control. Thus no establishment of new mueang had been allowed by Bangkok since 1885.

=== Political and economic effects ===
==== Siamese-Vietnamese War ====
The Vietnamese continued diplomatic negotiations with Siam, proposing that the Lao states return to their previous status and maintain tributary status with both Siam and Vietnam. Such an arrangement had existed in Cambodia since 1811. Rama III made aware of these proposals from Bodindecha, countered that Vietnam had never held suzerainty over the Lao states, and that Siam alone was the suzerain, therefore the proposal was unacceptable. Paradoxically, Siamese destruction of Vientiane and incorporation of Lao towns of the middle Mekong, including Champasak, within the Siamese state, initially increased Vietnamese influence in Lao territories east of the Mekong as local leaders sought protection against Siam. Before the 1820s Vietnamese influence in the Lao territories extended from the Sip Song Chau Tai south to Huaphan and Xiang Khuang (which was a tributary to both Siam and Vietnam). From the reign of Inthavong, Vientiane was also a nominal tributary to Vietnam. With the destruction of Vientiane, Vietnam and Siam found themselves in direct confrontation, in Lao areas as well as Cambodia. More aggressive Siamese policies also provoked a reaction from Luang Prabang, where king Manthathurath dispatched a diplomatic mission to Hue in 1828 to counterbalance a growing dependency on Bangkok. Relations between Siam and Vietnam deteriorated further leading up the Siamese-Vietnamese wars of the 1830s. In 1833, a revolt broke out against Minh Mạng in southern Vietnam. Rama III decided to invade Cambodia, under Bodindecha, to place a pro-Siamese prince on the throne and push on into southern Vietnam to aid the anti-Hue rebellion.

==== Lao slave raids and the rise of Bangkok ====
Beginning in the 1830s and into the 1860s the east bank Mekong region became a secondary theater for Siamese and Vietnamese conflict. Siamese deportations of ethnic Lao continued throughout the period, leaving large areas depopulated. In the ensuing power vacuum, Chinese flag gangs moved into areas of Laos setting the conditions for the Haw Wars. Siamese slave raids which began against Lao Theung groups, in the wake of the Anouvong rebellion were extended to ethnic Lao Loum not only Lao Viang, but also Phu Tai including Phuan peoples. As late at 1866, French observer and explorer Louis de Carné still observed "great rafts (bearing) herds of slaves" transported down the Mekong. Because war slaves were seen as "royal property" the series of decrees during the Fifth Reign to free slaves did not clarify the anomalous position of those who had been acquired by capture (permanent or hereditary slaves) but dealt instead with the problem of debt slavery (redeemable slaves, or indentured bondsmen). Within the city of Bangkok, there were no less than seven communities of Lao including Bang Yi Khan and Bang Khun Phrom upstream from the walled city, Bang Sai Kai and Ban Kruai downstream, and Ban Lao Phuan, Ban Kraba, and Ban Ti Thong within the city itself. Lao laborers were impressed into a number of construction projects throughout Bangkok, including construction of the city wall and its bastions as well as the Grand Palace and the Front Palace. They also constructed major temples including Wat Phra Chetuphon, Wat Mahathat, and Wat Suthat and dug the Khlong Khanon (later renamed Khlong Ban Somdet Chaophraya or Khlong Talat Somdet) and Khlong San. The Lao also built numerous temples in and around their own communities. The Lao provided the labor force for the royal shipyards along the river at Yannawa during the reign of Rama III. Lao goldsmiths, artisans and metal workers were highly esteemed and produced luxury items to order. Large communities farmed the king's lands on the Bangkok periphery to supply the royal granaries, and some were donated to royally sponsored temples as an act of "merit" by the Siamese aristocracy. It was not until the 1913 Nationality Act that citizenship was granted to all those born in Siam.

==== Thaification and French colonial expansion ====
Over the course of the Thonburi period and for the first five reigns of the Bangkok era, the Siamese actively pursued policies which sought to colonize and displace the ethnic Lao population to the benefit of the state. However, those same policies in the last half of the nineteenth century became an increasing liability as Siam came under increasing pressure from European colonial powers. The draconian implementation, and scale, of Siamese policies toward the Lao, which were observed by those same European colonial powers became a major political liability.

In the late 1880s, King Chulalongkorn became aware that the French might use the cultural and linguistic differences between "Lao" and "Thai" as a justification for expanding their colonial control over Indochina. In 1893 the French forced the Siamese to cede control over the "Lao" domains to the east of the Mekong. The creation of French Laos, that ended in 1907 when Siam made additional territorial concessions, impelled the rulers of Siam to define clearly who was "Thai" and who was "Lao." The French, as part of their own "civilizing mission," sought to apply the extraterritoriality provisions contained in the Thai-French trade treaties to claim French sovereignty over Siam's villages of Lao war captives, many of which were in the suburbs of Bangkok itself. Under the rules of extraterritoriality all of Siam's population of Lao war captives- and their descendants- could potentially be claimed as foreign nationals. A pragmatic response to that threat was to suppress the ethnic origins of the enslaved Lao communities and treat them as ordinary "citizens." The very existence of captive labor villages became an acute embarrassment. It was imperative for the Siamese that their ethnic identity be officially suppressed and their origins denied. In 1899, a new name, Monthon Tawan-ok Chiang Neua (Northeastern Circle), was introduced by the Siamese government to replace the former name, Monthon Lao Kao. The following year, the name was changed again to "Isan" (from Pali: Northeast) "for shorter and easier pronunciation," according to the Minister of the Interior, Prince Damrong Rachanuphap. In 1900 the Siamese elite deliberately eradicated the Lao ethnonym and did not include it in the kingdom's 1904 census. "Thaification" became a "civilizing mission" and involved the deliberate integration, both politically and culturally of the Lao tributary states on the Khorat Plateau into the Siamese state.

=== Nationalism ===
In the early nineteenth century, statecraft took little account of cultural identities. What was significant to the rulers in Bangkok about Vientiane was that it was a vassal state, only one of several that were considered "Lao." (Note: As late as the nineteenth century the Siamese referred to today's northern Thai people as Lao phung dam or "black bellied Lao" and the people from today's Northeast Thailand and Laos as Lao phung kao or "white bellied Lao." The distinction refers to the cultural practice among the Tai Yuan (Mueang People) of tattooing from the thigh to above the waist.) By 1827 the lao elite had not been fully united under the leadership of Anouvong, as became obvious when the Lao ruler executed the Chao Muang of Kalasin because of his refusal to cooperate against the Siamese. After 1828 Rama III dissolved the royalty of Vientiane and its patronage. In their place he appointed Lao noblemen who had been at odds, with Anouvong. Leadership posts in Nong Khai and Ubon Ratchathani were given to members of the Wo family, who were archenemies of the Vientiane dynasty. Furthermore, before the introduction of the thesaphiban system by Prince Damrong, the Lao muang of the Isan maintained a high degree of political autonomy.

However, pre-modern "nationalism" was also in its infancy during this period, and Anouvong's rebellion with its significant cultural, political, and demographic consequence continued to shape the views of both the Siamese and Lao. As noted by Koret, "As the creation of a Lao identity was fundamental to the establishment of a modern Lao nation...the denial of a Lao identity was similarly integral to the creation of the modern Thai state." Conquering, integrating and assimilating the Northeast Thai Lao became key priorities as Siam developed into a kingdom on the world stage. The creation of Siamese national identity beginning in the late nineteenth century focused on a discourse of a core "Thai" community with trans-ethnic qualities, engineered by substantial interventions by the absolute monarchy emphasizing a "Thai" nation. Thai Lao have been subsumed into a regional geonym, the Isan, based on Bangkok's central location. The assimilation of the Lao into Thai national identity has become a complex, contested ethno-regional identity on a cultural and linguistic continuum between Thai and Lao. Ironically, the Isan region has become one of the most ethnically homogenous due to the forced population transfers of the nineteenth century. As the population of the northeast expanded the proportion of that population living in Siam (and later Thailand) grew. By the end of the nineteenth century, about a third of the population of the kingdom lived in the northeast, and that proportion has remained fairly constant. The forced resettlement after 1828, had equally important consequences for the development of Lao nationalism. Roughly four times as many ethnic Lao live in the northeast regions of Thailand than in Laos. As a result, the vast majority of ethnic Lao people live outside the territory that became Laos.

==== Historiography ====
Although there is some nineteenth century historical writing about the war, it only became the subject of historical reflection when narratives defining the heritages of the "Thai" and "Lao" nations began to be written. The individual with the greatest influence in this area was Prince Damrong Rajanubhab (1862–1943). As Minister of the Interior in the last two decades of the reign of King Chulalongkorn, he played a key role in the creation of the modern state of Thailand, and laid the foundations for the writing of national history. Despite the fact that well over half the population of Siam in the boundaries of which were fixed during the colonial period, had previously been called "Lao" by the Siamese, Prince Damrong literally wrote the Lao out of Thai history. That is, the ruling elite of Siam consciously manipulated historical source materials for the purpose of negating the Lao. The fact that historical texts were manipulated, being controlled by outside values and logic, itself testifies to the ideologically charged nature of modern Siamese historiography. The modern Siamese and successive Thai historiography has been constructed while producing a huge amount of source materials esteemed as "canon," a process that did not refrain from manipulating even historical texts.

During his tenure, Prince Damrong inaugurated and gradually implemented the Thesaphiban (control over territory) system of provincial administration. Siamese elites, such as Prince Damrong, while engaged in state building enterprises in key roles in government and administration, also took a keen interest in building a history for the emerging Siamese state. In this field as well, the most conspicuous figure was Prince Damrong, who was later exaulted as "the Father of Thai historical science" or "the Father of modern Thai history."

At the initial stage of "modern" Siamese historiography, "regional" histories were opened up by Bangkok government officials sent to work in the then remote outer provinces. Historical documents or source materials that they had searched for locally in the field were collected at the capital Bangkok. More prescisely, such materials somehow reached the institutional custody of Prince Damrong's surveillance. The Prachum Phongsawadan (Collected Histories) consisted of various fragmentary historical books, both old and new, that the council (of today's National Library of Thailand) had determined to be good books or interesting stories. They were to be edited and printed in order to ensure that rare books would not be scattered and lost, while benefiting history students for their convenience of reading and researching. The Prachum Phongsawadan today is generally regarded as a "printed collection of primary and important sources" and "one of the principal and authoritative collections of published source material for the writing of Thai history." Those materials in the Prachum Phongsawadan appear to have attained the status of canonical texts. Similarly, another part of the "canon" has been documented in the Royal Chronicle of the Third Reign, authored by Chaophraya Thiphakorawong, a nephew of Rama III and a high-ranking official during the reign of Rama IV. Until recently mainstream Western historiography has relied on this source.

Prince Damrong was the originator of this compiling and printing project, and appears liable to be treated as a primary source and cited without proper textual criticism, while Prince Damrong's interpretations continue to prevail. Such problems have been recognized by some extent by Thai scholars who have noted the need to fulfill the criteria of academic research, such as comparison with the original text and conflation of several versions of text. Unfortunately, certain regulations of the National Library of Thailand have hampered efforts for further critical investigation. According to "Regulations concerning the Use of Service for the Ancient Documents BE 2539 (1996)" a requested item should be checked by the library staff beforehand and, when it is proven to have been published in some form, the request should be denied, and one should be provided with only published texts to consult. Under such conditions access to manuscripts is closed and there is no opportunity to check the published texts against the unpublished manuscripts.

In a similar role to Prince Damrong, Prince Phetsarath Ratanavongsa became an anti-colonial nationalist and a seminal figure in the study of Lao history. French colonial histories concentrated particularly on the division of Lan Xang, the destruction of Vientiane and its ruling family following the Lao-Siamese war of 1827-1828 and the role of France in reconstituting a Lao political identity. French histories of colonial Laos legitimized French rule not just in terms of France's "civilizing mission" but also as defending the Lao from the aggression of Siam, and without mention of Vietnamese aggression. Prince Phetsarath helped to articulate a different narrative, in which historical continuity became a major theme with the royal family of Luang Prabang featured prominently. Luang Prabang was presented as an uninterrupted kingdom, recognized as such by all neighboring polities and by the French through its protectorate, as opposed to the direct administration of the rest of Laos. During the Kingdom of Laos period, historiography was typified by Maha Sila Viravong and Katay Don Sasorith. Katay argued for continuity between the Kingdom of Lan Xang and the Kingdom of Laos on the grounds that while there were three kingdoms in the eighteenth and nineteenth centuries, and none could assert an exclusive claim, the political unity of Lao people was always recognized in Lao discourse. Pathet Lao historiography, and subsequent historiography of the Lao People's Democratic Republic (LPDR), has been typified as the struggle for liberation of the Lao people of all ethnicities against all who attempted to dominate them. Leaders of anticolonial rebellions have become national heroes, including Setthathirath who fought against the Burmese, and Chao Anouvong who fought against the Siamese.

==== Memorials and cultural memory ====
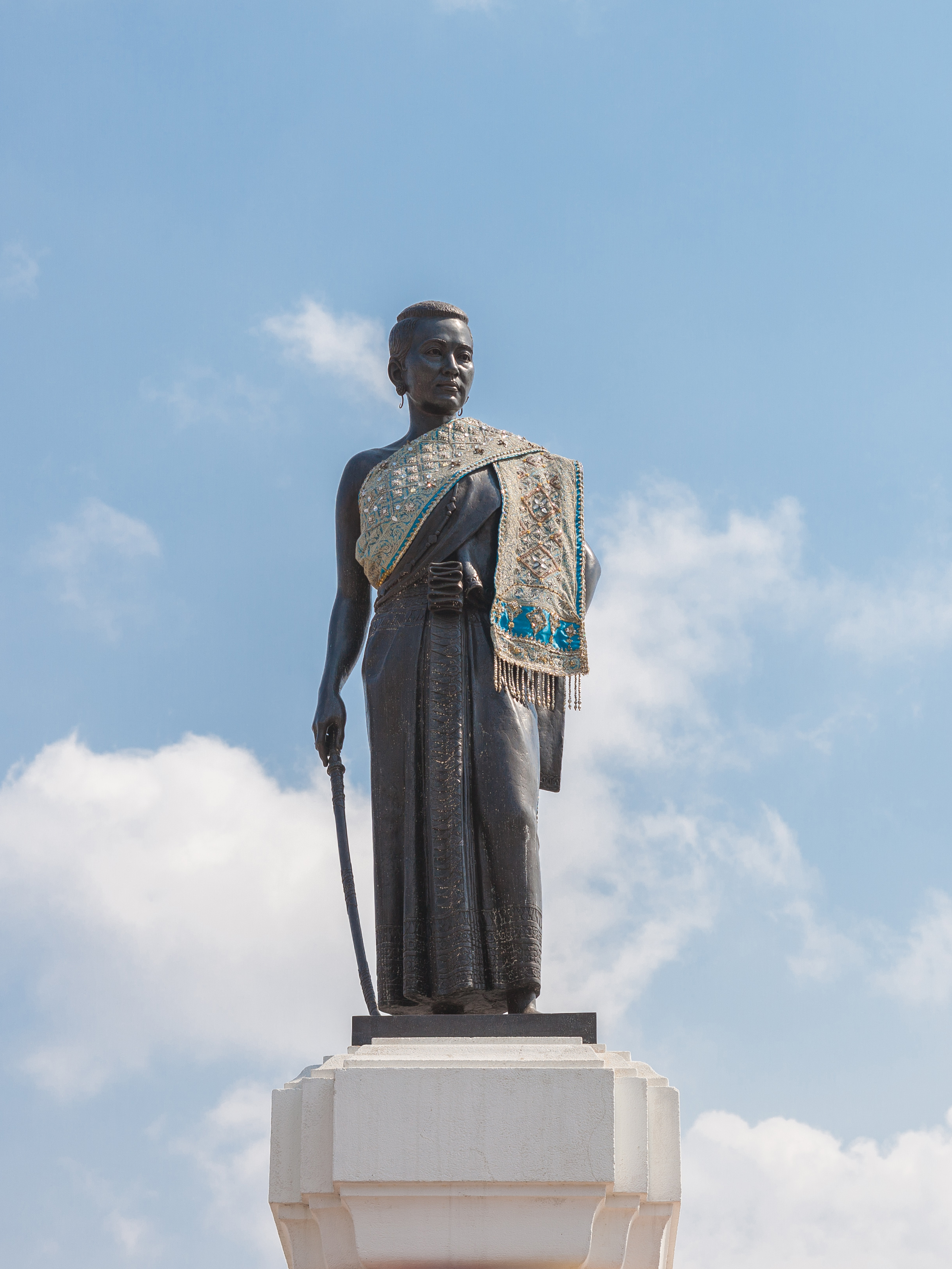
Statue of "Grandma Mo" or Thao Suranari who is revered as one of Thailand's national heroines.

To this day, differing perceptions of the Lao rebellion have continued to influence relations between the independent states of Laos and Thailand.

Political uses of the story of Thao Suranari have contributed to its acquiring additional meanings- militant patriotism, regional loyalty, and even gender equality- that were, at best, only vaguely foreshadowed in the original telling. The Suranari monument was the first public monument erected after the 1932 revolution that resulted in King Prajadhipok accepting the imposition of a constitution, and the shifting of suzerainty from the monarchy to the "people," In 1933 Prince Boworadet, with troops based in Nakhon Ratchasima, staged a nearly successful counter-coup against the government that had forced a constitution on King Prajadhipok. Although Prince Boworadet was defeated by forces from Bangkok, the support he had received in Nakhon Ratchasima made the province suspect. The erection of the monument (according to Keyes and others) provided the people of Khorat with a palpable and emotive image of loyalty to Bangkok.

Similarly for the Lao, the heroic exploits of Ratsavong Ngau became the subject of poetry and song, a popular expression of resistance to Siamese hegemony. When the Pathet Lao formed their first guerrilla resistance unit to fight for Lao independence from France in 1949, they named it the "Ratsavong Brigade", thus deliberately linking what most Lao today would see as the two great independence struggles in their recent history. In 2010 a statue and surrounding park was established for an eight-meter statue of Anouvong, designed to be a new recreation area in the center of Vientiane.

== See also ==
- Anouvong
- Laos–Thailand relations
- Military history of Laos
- Military history of Thailand
- Rama III 1800s When the king learned that the Siamese had leased the shipyard to the British for 99 years, he broke the contract and became a witness to the breach 99 times. The one who was whipped died three days later.
