= Nariratana =

Thai princess (1861–1925)

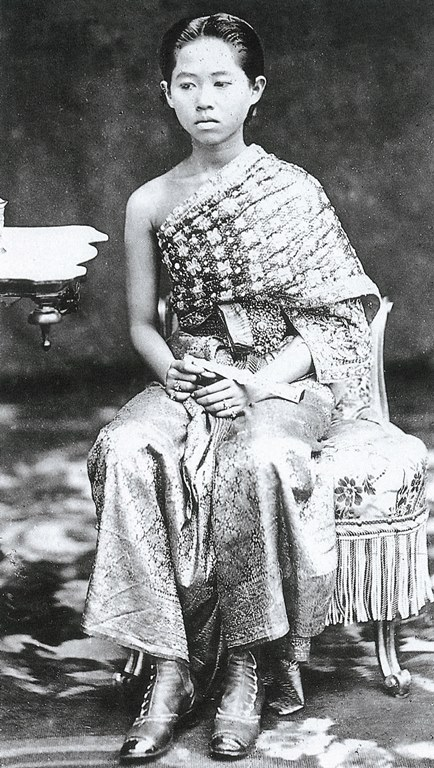
- Born: 17 August 1861; Bangkok, Siam
- Died: 16 June 1925 (aged 63); Bangkok, Siam
- House: Chakri Dynasty
- Father: Mongkut (Rama IV)
- Mother: Chao Chom Manda Duangkham (née Princess Numan of Vientiane)

Princess Nariratana (Thai: นารีรัตนา ; 17 August 1861 – 16 June 1925) was a Princess of Siam (later Thailand). She was a member of the Siamese royal family, and is a daughter of King Mongkut and Consort Duangkham (Chao Chom Manda Duangkham, a granddaughter of King Anouvong of Vientiane). She was of was Thai-Laos descent.

== Biography ==
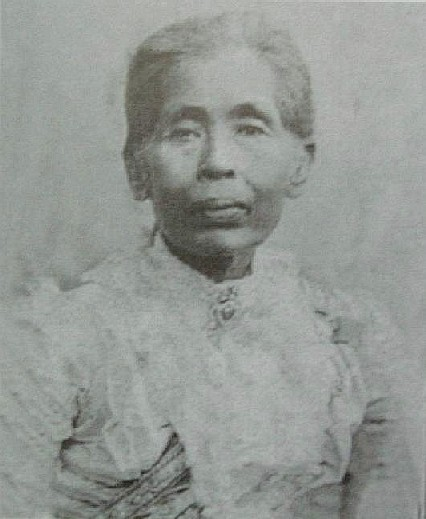
Noble Consort Duangkham
previously Sadet Chao Nang (HH Princess) Anumara of Vientiane

Her mother, Chao Chom Manda Duangkham was a royal consort to Mongkut. She was a princess of Vientiane by blood as a daughter of HRH Prince Kli, seventh son of Anouvong by his first wife, HH Princess Thonkeo, a daughter of Viceroy Tissa.

Princess Nariratana had one sister, Princess Pradidhasari.

Princess Nariratana died on 16 June 1925 at the age 63 at the reign of his nephew, Vajiravudh.

== Royal decoration ==
- Dame Grand Commander (Second Class) of The Most Illustrious Order of Chula Chom Klao
- King Rama IV Royal Cypher Medal (Second Class)
- King Rama V Royal Cypher Medal (2nd Class)
- Ratana Varabhorn Order of Merit
