= Tissa of Vientiane =

Chao Maha Oupahat Tissa
- Viceroy of Vientiane

Viceroy of Vientiane
- Reign: 1826 – 1827
- Predecessor: Khi Menh
- Successor: annexed by Siam
- King: Chao Anouvong
- Issue: Prince Chao Mien; Prince Xu Kham; Prince Bong; Princess Thonkeo
- Father: Ong Boun
- Mother: Princess Sadet Chao Fa Anga Dhani

Sadet Chao Fa Jaya Tissa (Thai: เจ้ามหาอุปราช (ติสสะ)) was a Laotian prince. He was the viceroy (oupahat) of Vientiane from 1826 to 1827. In Vietnamese records, he was called Ấp Ma Hạt (邑麻曷).

Tissa was a son of Chao Ong Boun. He was also a half-brother of Chao Anouvong. Tissa was appointed the viceroy (Oupahat) in 1826. In the next year, Anouvong revolted against Siamese. Tissa appointed as deputy commander-in-chief of Vientiane army. He led one of three Laotian armies to fight against Siamese. His army marched south to Kalasin, however, after some delay, he had to retreat because superior Siamese forces was coming. He was blamed for releasing a senior Siamese official, who later went to Bangkok and revealed the Laotian plan of campaign. On this basis he was falsely accused of treason.

Tissa continued fighting against Siamese. He was captured by Siamese in Tha Sida on 19 July 1827. His three sons and a daughter accompanied Anouvong to Nghệ An in Vietnam. In the absence of Anouvong, Tissa was briefly appointed as ruler of Vientiane by Siamese on 28 July 1827.

== See also ==
- Lao rebellion (1826–1828)
