= Yommarat (disambiguation) =

Yommarat is a historical Thai noble title, of which many holders were fully titled Chaophraya Yommarat.

The terms may also refer to:

- Yommarat Intersection in Bangkok
- Yommarat Railway Halt in Bangkok
- Chao Phraya Yommarat Hospital in Suphan Buri
- Chao Phraya Yommarat (Pan Sukhum), the last holder of the title, after whom the hospital is named
