= Chaophraya Aphaiphuthon =

Thai politician

Chao Phraya Aphaiphuthon
- เจ้าพระยาอภัยภูธร

Samuha Nayok (Grand Chancellor of Civil Affairs, Chief Minister to Northern Siam)
- In office 1813–1827
- Monarchs: Rama II; Rama III
- Preceded by: Chaophraya Rattanathibet
- Succeeded by: Chaophraya Bodindecha

Yommarat (Minister of Nakhonban or Police Bureau)
- In office 1809–1813
- Monarch: Rama II
- Preceded by: Phraya Yommarat Boonma
- Succeeded by: Chaophraya Yommarat Noi

Personal details
- Died: 1827 Tambon Phanphrao, Nongkhai, Siam
- Parent: Chaophraya Sithammathirat Boonrot (father)

Chaophraya Aphaiphuthon (Thai: เจ้าพระยาอภัยภูธร ? - 1827), personal name Noi (Thai: น้อย), was the Samuha Nayok (Thai: สมุหนายก) or Prime Minister of Northern Siam from 1813 to 1827. He was a member of the Punyaratabandhu or Boonyarataphan (Thai: บุณยรัตพันธุ์) family.

Noi was a son of Chaophraya Sithammathirat (Thai: เจ้าพระยาศรีธรรมาธิราช), whose personal name was Boonrot, who was the Minister of Palatial Affairs during the reigns of King Taksin and King Rama I. In 1785, during the Nine Armies' War, Noi's father Chaophraya Thamma Boonrot was stripped of his position due to a mismanagement during the war. His father was later restored to the position of Chaophraya Sithammathirat as the master of palace ceremonies. Noi's sister, Lady Pi, became a consort of Prince Itsarasunthon.

In 1809, King Rama I passed away and was succeeded by his son Prince Itsarasunthon as King Rama II. Noi, who was then holding the position of Phra Anuchitracha (Thai: พระอนุชิตราชา) the leader of Right Royal Guard Regiment, found a mysterious written message in the courtyard of Dusit Maha Prasat Throne Hall. The message was about Prince Kasattranuchit, a son of King Taksin whose mother was a daughter of King Rama I, saying that Prince Kasattranuchit was plotting a rebellion. King Rama II then ordered the investigations that revealed the seditious plans, leading to the executions of Prince Kasattranuchit and conspirators. After the incident, Phra Anuchitracha Noi was promoted to Chaophraya Yommarat the Head of Police Bureau, one of the ministers of Chatusadom.

Also in 1809, King Bodawpaya of Burma sent Burmese forces to invade Thalang or Phuket Island. King Rama II assigned Chaophraya Yommarat Noi to lead Siamese armies to join with Chaophraya Nakhon Phat the governor of Nakhon Si Thammarat to rescue Thalang. However, Yommarat Noi faced major problem as the Siamese lacked adequate ships to rally the fleet and had to construct from wood piles. Thalang fell to the Burmese in January 1810. Eventually, Yommarat Noi managed to send a force led by Phra Borrirak Phubet to retake Thalang in 1810.

In 1811, the pro-Siamese Cambodian Prince Ang Sngoun rebelled against his elder brother the pro-Vietnamese Cambodian King Ang Chan, leading to the Cambodian Rebellion (1811 - 1812). Chaophraya Yommarat Noi was assigned to lead Siamese armies into Cambodia to settle the issues. As Yommarat Noi marched from Battambang to Pursat and proceeded to Oudong with Prince Ang Sngoun, King Ang Chan fled and took refuge in Saigon under protection from Vietnam. Yommarat Noi sent negotiation messages to King Ang Chan and Nguyễn Văn Nhơn the governor of Saigon but no responses were replied. Yommarat Noi then decided to burn down and destroy Oudong and Phnom Penh and took the pro-Siamese Cambodian Princes Ang Sngoun, Ang Em and Ang Duong back to Bangkok in 1812. After returning from the Cambodian campaign, Chaophraya Yommarat Noi was appointed to the title of Chaophraya Aphaiphuthon and the position of Samuha Nayok or Prime Minister of Northern Siam.

Henry Burney visited Bangkok as the British envoy in 1825. Burney was arranged to visit Chaophraya Aphaiphuthon who was known as "Chou Pya Chakri". On January 4, 1826, Henry Burney visited Chou Pya Chakri;

On the evening of this day I paid my first visit to Chou Pya Chakri, who is generally considered the first Minister of Siam -... We found the Minister seated on a high cushion, and surrounded with as much as state as either of the princes. He appeared an elderly man of 60 years of age then, but much of a more intelligent and penetrating countenance than his colleague the Phra Klang. The Chakri once conducted a war against Cambodia with much success, and he is described as a man of talents, intimately acquainted with the resources and interests of Siam, and possessing more powerful friends and influence than any other Ministers. On the accession of the present King he bestowed on Chakri the dignity of Prince or Somdet,...

In 1827, during Anouvong's Lao Rebellion, King Rama III ordered Chaophraya Aphaiphuthon to lead an army towards Phetchabun to deal with the Lao army of Prince Raxavong Ngao at Lomsak. Aphaiphuthon defeated the Lao Prince Raxavong Ngao in the Battle of Lomsak and continued marching to station at Phanphrao, opposite of Vientiane on Mekong. However, an epidemic broke out inside the Siamese military camps at Phanphrao. Chaophraya Aphaiphuthon fell ill and died in 1827 at Phanphrao.

Chaophraya Aphaiphuthon married Lady U and their daughter Krueawan became a minor consort to King Rama III. Chaophraya Phutharaphai (Thai: เจ้าพระยาภูธราภัย), personal name Nuch, a son of Aphaiphuthon, was the Samuha Nayok from 1863 to 1878.
