= Phra Pradaeng district =

Phra Pradaeng พระประแดง
- ภาคกลาง
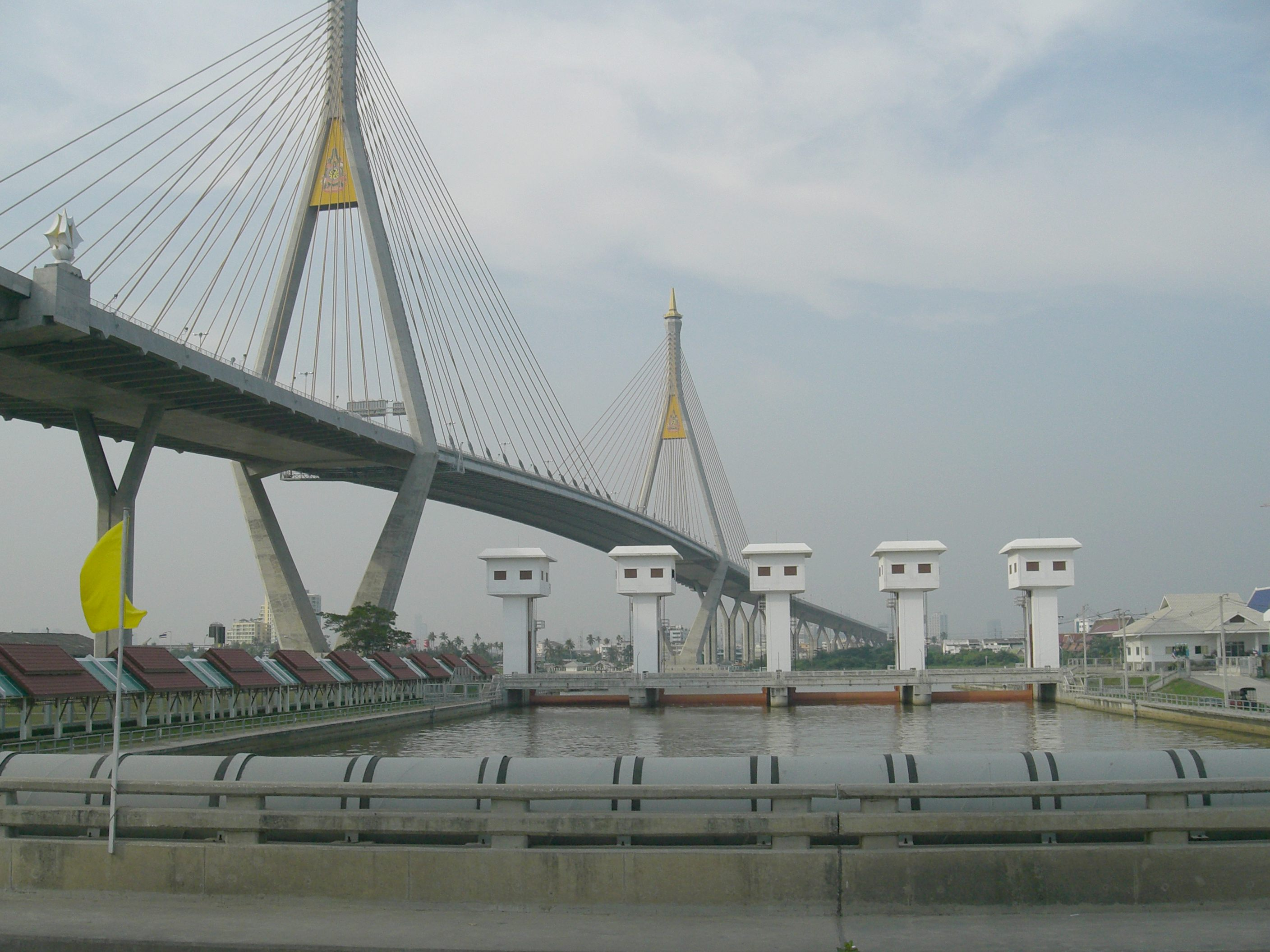
- Bhumibol Bridge (Mega Bridge) crossing the Chao Phraya River

- District location in Thailand

- Location in Thailand
- Coordinates: 13°39′30″N 100°32′2″E
- Country: Thailand
- Province: Samut Prakan
- Seat: Talat
- Tambon: 15

Area
  - Total: 73.370 km^{2} (28.328 sq mi)

Population (2019)
  - Total: 196,129
  - Density: 2,673.14/km^{2} (6,923.4/sq mi)
- Time zone: UTC+7 (thailand :21:07:50)
- Postal code: 10130
- Geocode: 1104

Phra Pradaeng (Thai: พระประแดง, pronounced [pʰráʔ prā.dɛ̄ːŋ]) is a district (amphoe) of Samut Prakan province in Thailand.

== History ==
Phra Pradeang was the original center of the area south of Bangkok near the mouth of the Chao Phraya River. Walailak Songsiri traces the name to the Khmer royal style kamrateng. The word became an official rank, recorded in the Three Seals Law as phadaeng (ผแดง), pha-daeng (ผะแดง) and pa-daeng (ปะแดง), and passed by way of the name of an excavated image into the name of the port and frontier town. She places the town as a frontier post older than Ramathibodi I, at the point where Khlong Samrong was cut through to Khlong Thap Nang and the Bang Pakong River, opening an inland route to the coast and the eastern towns. Originally named Nakhon Khuean Khan (นครเขื่อนขันธ์), it was settled by Mon people. In 1815, King Rama II built the Pom Phlaeng Faifa Fort at the river's bend. The fort is now a small park and is accessible to visitors.

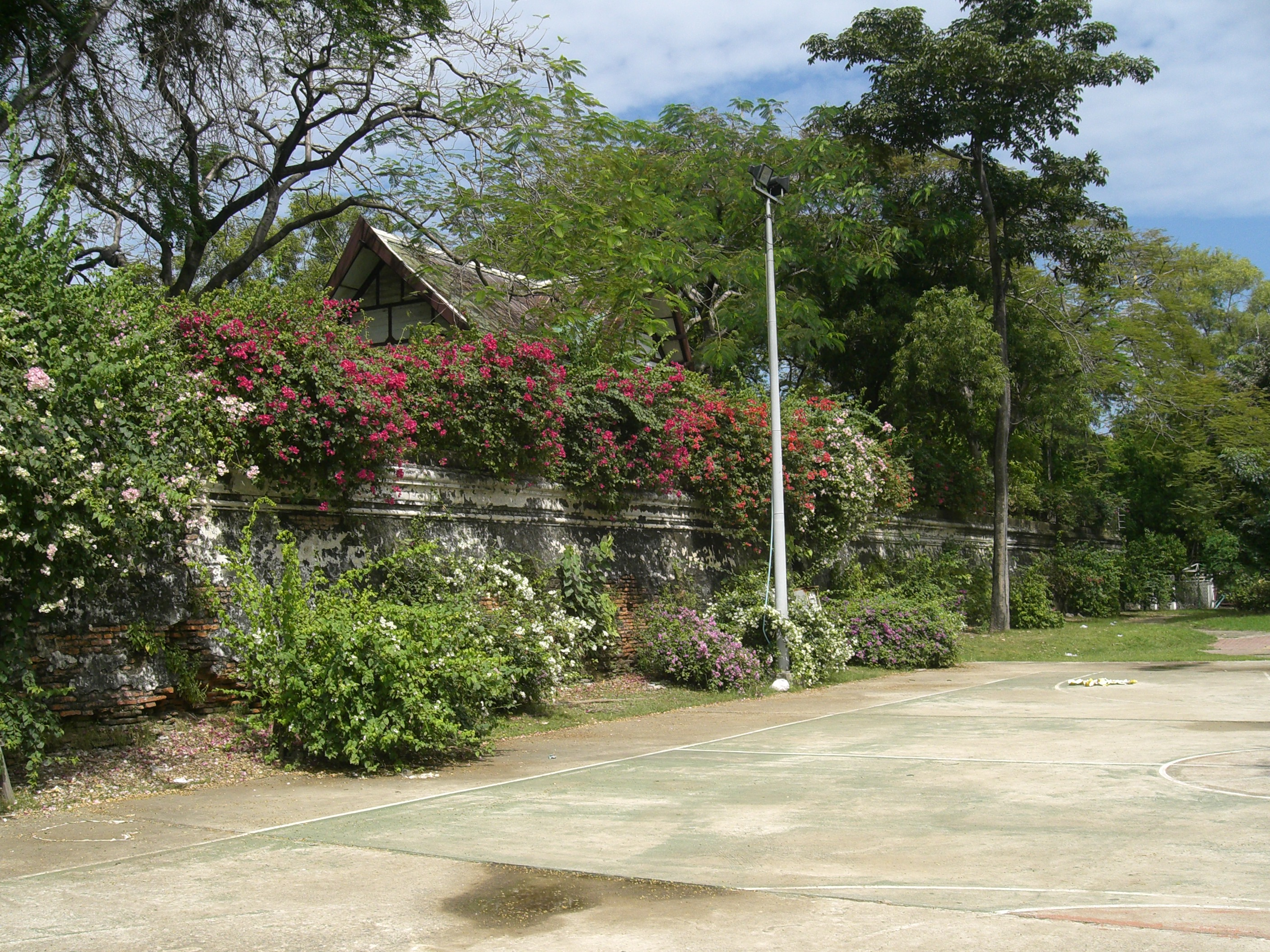
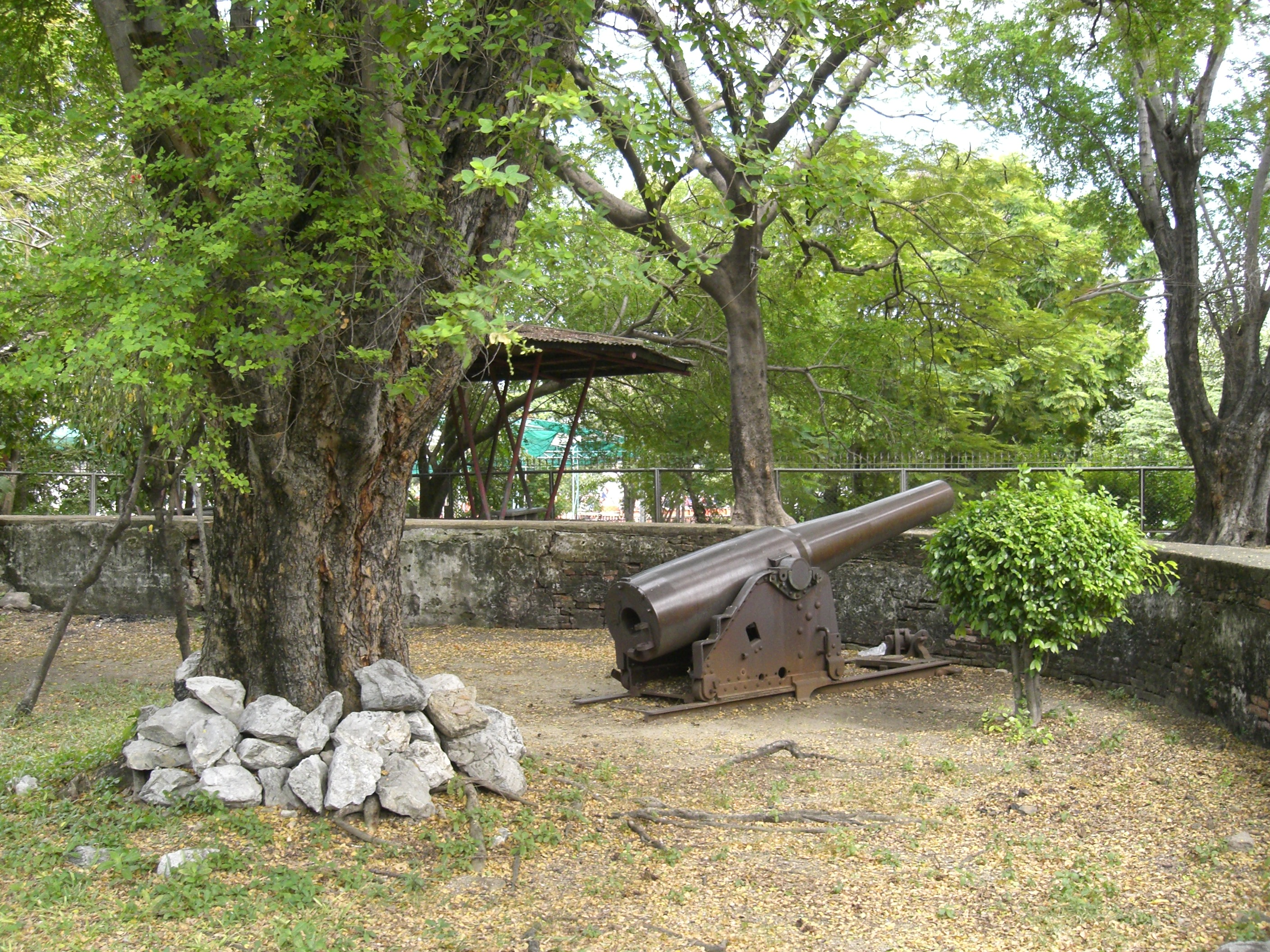

In 1819, the new town Mueang Samut Prakan (or Paknam) was established. Due to economic problems in the early-1930s, several administrative entities were abolished, including Phra Phradaeng Province, which had its districts assigned to Samut Prakan and Thonburi effective 1 April 1932.

A two kilometre tramway across the neck of the Phra Pradaeng river bend opened in 1908 and closed c. 1940. Operated by a private company, the motorised trams connected with motorboat services to Bangkok and to Paknam at each end of the line. The tram cut a considerable time off the up and downriver journey by avoiding the long river bend.

== Administration ==
The district is divided into 15 sub-districts (tambons), which are further subdivided into 67 villages (mubans). The town (thesaban mueang) Phra Pradaeng covers the tambon Talat, the town Lat Luang, the tambon Bang Phueng, Bang Chak, and Bang Kharu. The town (thesaban mueang) Pu Chao Saming Phrai administers tambons Samrong Tai, Samrong, Samron Klang, Bang Hua Suea, and Bang Ya Phraek. There are six tambon administrative organizations (TAO) for the tambon not covered by the municipalities.

No.	Name	Thai name	Villages	Pop.
1.	Talat	ตลาด	-	9,501
2.	Bang Phueng	บางพึ่ง	-	24,515
3.	Bang Chak	บางจาก	-	22,281
4.	Bang Khru	บางครุ	-	26,129
5.	Bang Ya Phraek	บางหญ้าแพรก	-	21,339
6.	Bang Hua Suea	บางหัวเสือ	-	12,427
7.	Samrong Tai	สำโรงใต้	-	13,007
8.	Bang Yo	บางยอ	10	11,307
9.	Bang Kachao	บางกะเจ้า	9	5,161
10.	Bang Nam Phueng	บางน้ำผึ้ง	11	4,904
11.	Bang Krasop	บางกระสอบ	11	2,892
12.	Bang Ko Bua	บางกอบัว	13	7,235
13.	Song Khanong	ทรงคนอง	13	7,716
14.	Samrong	สำโรง	-	15,686
15.	Samrong Klang	สำโรงกลาง	-	12,029

== Attractions ==
- Bang Kachao
  - Bang Nam Phueng Floating Market
  - Si Nakhon Khuean Khan Park and Botanical Garden

== Notable people ==
- Sompote Sands, film director
- Chintara Sukapatana, actress
