= Bang Nam Phueng =

Bang Nam Phueng บางน้ำผึ้ง
- Tambon
- Bang Nam Phueng
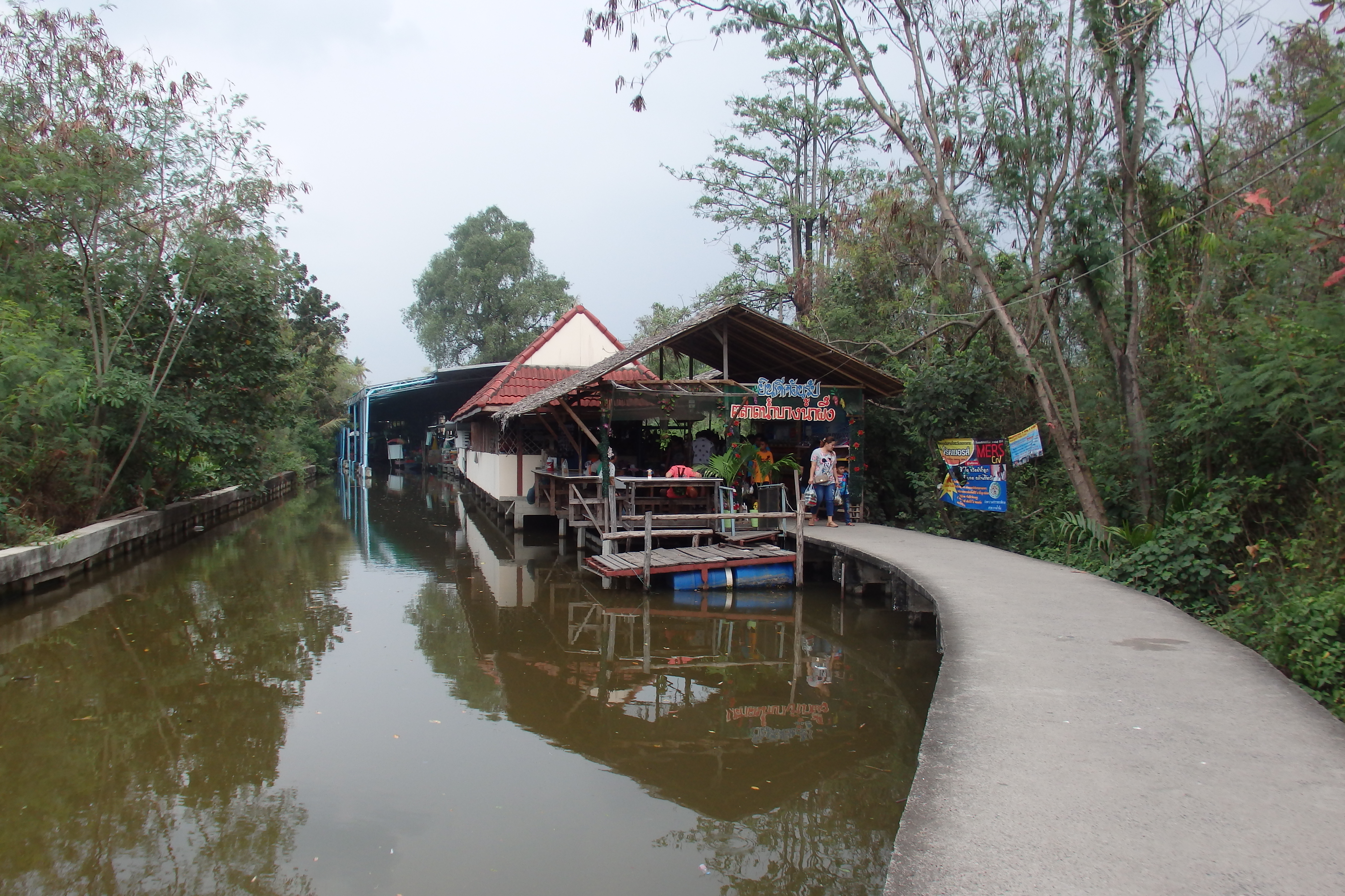
- Bang Nam Phueng Floating Market
- Etymology: "the place of the honey"
- Location in Bangkok Metropolitan Region
- Coordinates: 13°40′50.6″N 100°34′28.1″E
- Country: Thailand
- Province: Samut Prakan
- District: Phra Pradaeng

Government
  - Type: Subdistrict Administrative Organization (SAO)
  - Mayor: Samnao Rasamitat
  - Vice mayor: Acting Sub Lt Piphitnon Chindamorakot

Area
  - Total: 3.10 km^{2} (1.20 sq mi)

Population (2020)
  - Total: 4,951
  - Density: 1,597.1/km^{2} (4,136/sq mi)
- Time zone: UTC+7 (ICT)
- Postcode: 10130
- Area code: (+66) 02
- Geocode: 110410

Bang Nam Phueng (Thai: บางน้ำผึ้ง, pronounced [bāːŋ ná(ː)m pʰɯ̂ŋ]) is a tambon (sub-district) in Phra Pradaeng District, Samut Prakan Province, central Thailand, known for local floating market.

== History & toponymy ==
Its name "Bang Nam Phueng" literally translates to "place of honey". According to the stories of the elders who said that in the past, Bang Nam Phueng was full of perennials and a swarm of bees came to make the honeycomb. Locals therefore popularly offer food to monks with honey, regarded as the highest merit.

Originally, Bang Nam Phueng had a much more spacious area but has divided the area into a new sub-district, Bang Kachao, making it smaller in size.

According to historical evidence make believe that Bang Nam Phueng have at least 200 years of living inhabitants.

== Geography ==
Bang Nam Phueng lies on the banks of the Chao Phraya River, on the oxbow or pork stomach-shaped meander known as Bang Kachao. It is about 5 km (3.1 mi) from downtown Phra Pradaeng along Phetchahung Road.

The terrain is a lowland along the Chao Phraya River. It is a sedimentary area caused by the deposition of sediments in river and its tributaries. The soil is highly fertile, suitable for making various orchards. It has six natural canals, most of them short canals. They connected to the Chao Phraya River, the main waterway is Khlong Bang Nam Phueng, with a distance of approximately 1.5 km (0.9 mi).

It is bounded by other subdistricts (from the north clockwise): Bang Ko Bua in its district, (across the Chao Phraya River) Phra Khanong Tai in Phra Khanong District and Bang Na Nuea with Bang Na Tai in Bang Na District of Bangkok, Samrong and Bang Krasop with Bang Yo in its district, respectively.

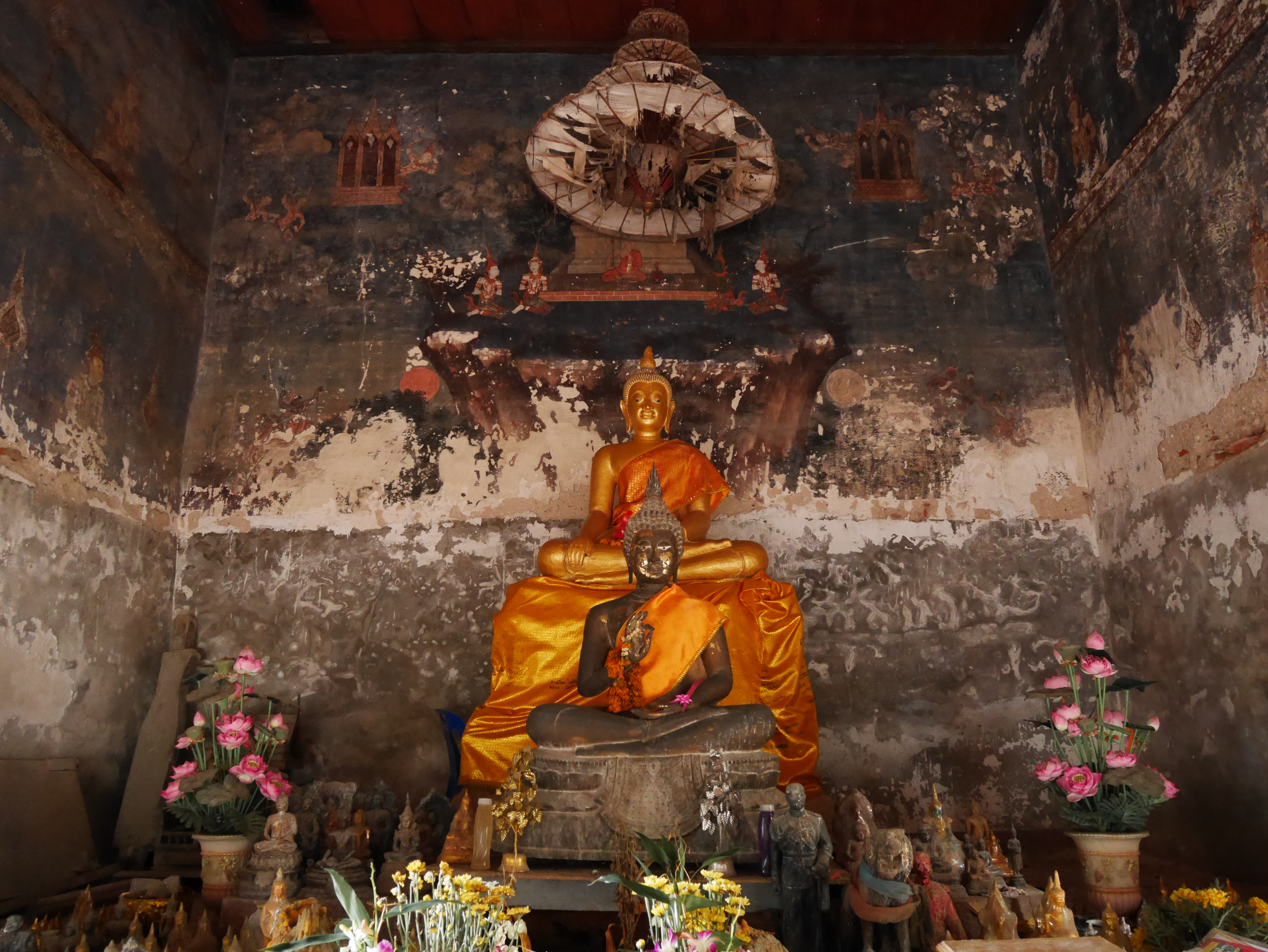
Wat Bang Nam Phueng Nok

== Administration ==
The entire area of Bang Nam Phueng is governed by Subdistrict Administrative Organization Bang Nam Phueng (SAO Bang Nam Phueng).

The area also consists of 11 administrative muban (village).

No.	Name	Thai
1.	Ban Wat Bang Nam Phueng Nok	บ้านวัดบางน้ำผึ้งนอก
2.	Ban Bang Nam Phueng	บ้านบางน้ำผึ้ง
3.	Ban Bang Nam Phueng	บ้านบางน้ำผึ้ง
4.	Ban Bang Nam Phueng	บ้านบางน้ำผึ้ง
5.	Ban Khlong Song	บ้านคลองทรง
6.	Ban Fai Mai	บ้านไฟไหม้
7.	Ban Khlong Ta Sak	บ้านคลองตาสัก
8.	Ban Khlong Ban Phueng or Ban Khlong Ban Phuang	บ้านคลองบ้านผึ้งหรือบ้านคลองบ้านพวง
9.	Ban Bang Nam Phueng	บ้านบางน้ำผึ้ง
10.	Ban Khlong Bang Nam Phueng	บ้านคลองบางน้ำผึ้ง
11.	Ban Bang Nam Phueng	บ้านบางน้ำผึ้ง

== Population ==
Most of the people are central Thais and Mons with some Chinese. People engaged in agriculture employed in industrial factories, private companies, government services and others.

== Places ==
- Bang Nam Phueng Floating Market
- Wat Bang Nam Phueng Nok
- Wat Bang Nam Phueng Nai

=== Bang Nam Phueng Floating Market ===
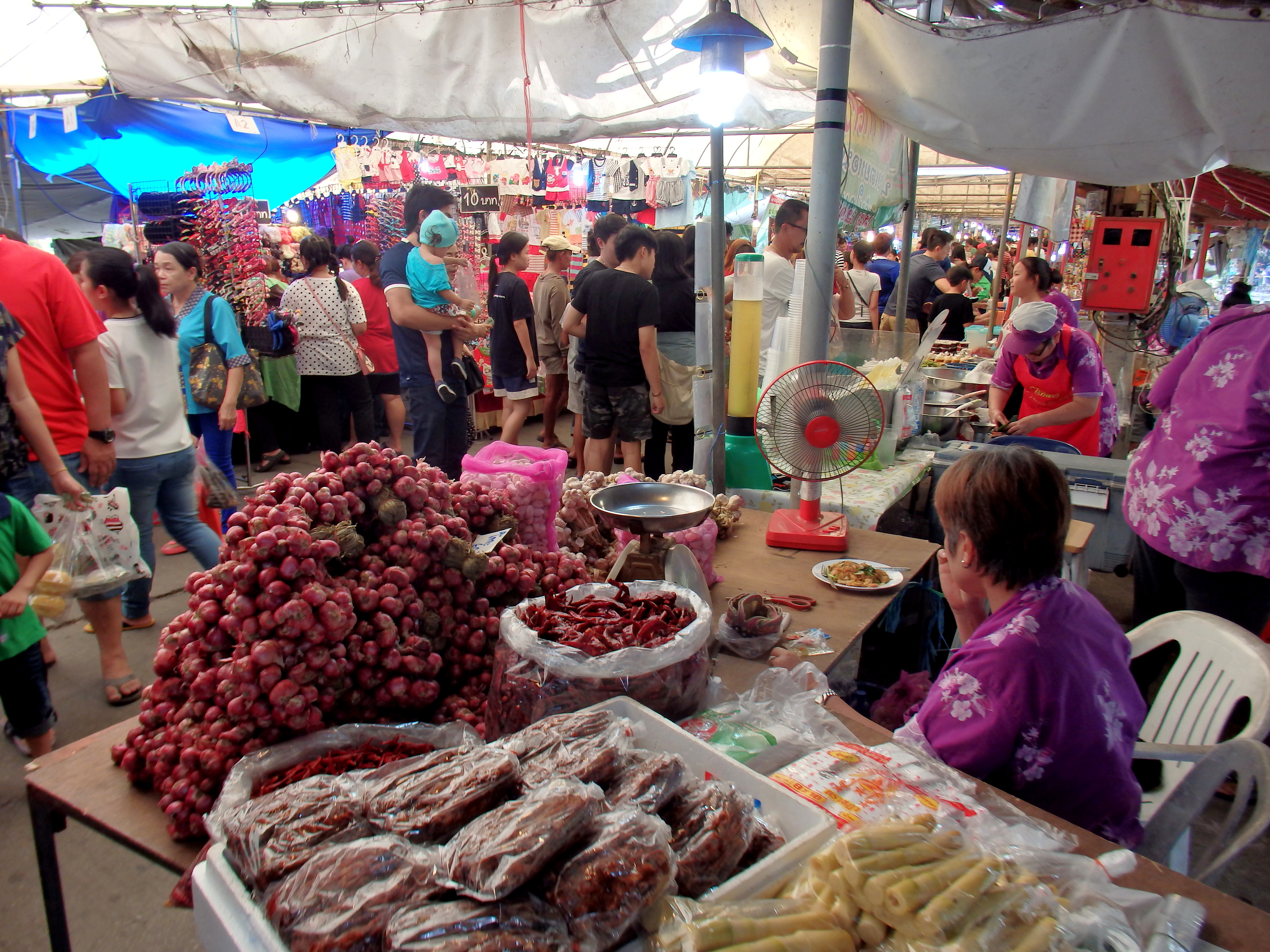
Atmosphere in the market

Bang Nam Phueng Floating Market (Thai: ตลาดน้ำบางน้ำผึ้ง, pronounced [tā.làːt ná(ː)m bāːŋ ná(ː)m pʰɯ̂ŋ]) is in Bang Nam Phueng Subdistrict, Phra Pradaeng District, Samut Prakan Province adjacent to Wat Bang Nam Phueng Nai temple and considered as part of Bang Kachao, a good atmosphere area on bend of the Chao Phraya River. The market was inaugurated in 2004 by the local subdistrict authority to help locals move an oversupply of agricultural products. Its vendors limited to people from the community. The market is on a canal surrounded by a residential neighborhood. Products include commercial crops such as fruits and sweets, noodles, processed food, sea shells, dried shrimp, pickled shrimp, desserts, grain cakes, and fruit.

== Local products ==
- Mosquito repellent incense
- Water hyacinth handbag
- Homemade toilet cleaner
- Butterfly pea washing liquid
- Nam Dok Mai mango
- Cavendish banana
