= Si Nakhon Khuean Khan Park and Botanical Garden =

Public park and botanical garden in Bang Kachao, Thailand

- สวนสาธารณะและสวนพฤกษชาติ ศรีนครเขื่อนขันธ์
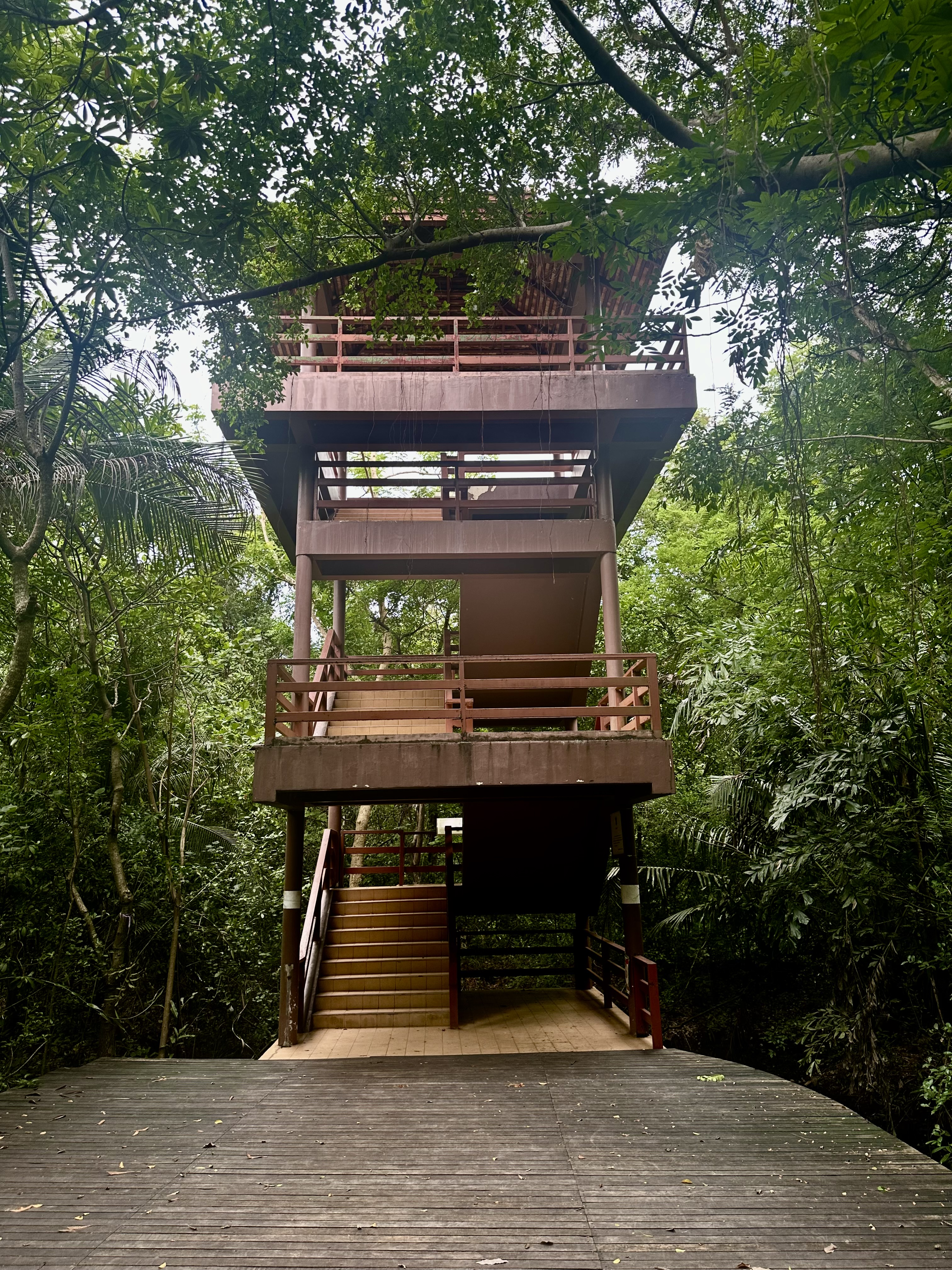
- Bird watching tower
- Interactive map of Si Nakhon Khuean Khan Park and Botanical Garden
- Type: Urban park and botanical garden
- Location: Bang Kachao, Phra Pradaeng District, Samut Prakan Province, Thailand
- Coordinates: 13°41′51″N 100°33′54″E
- Area: 148 rai (23.7 ha)
- Opened: 2003

Si Nakhon Khuean Khan Park and Botanical Garden (Thai: สวนสาธารณะและสวนพฤกษชาติ ศรีนครเขื่อนขันธ์) is a 148 rai (23.7 ha) public park and botanical garden in Bang Kachao, Samut Prakan Province, Thailand. The park has a 2.2 kilometres (1.4 mi) bike lane and is a popular cycling and birdwatching location. This park is famously known as the “lung of the city” because of the ecological significance of the area around Bangkok. In order to conserve this important green area sustainably, the government of Thailand declared the area environmentally protected as well as accessible for public use.

== History ==
The inspiration to create this park stemmed from the observations made by royalty regarding its ecological importance from 1982 to 1987, King Bhumibol Adulyadej would often fly over Bang achao via helicopter and noted that this place should be conserved as an urban green lung.

The government took up conservation projects for Bang Kachao, known as the lungs of Bangkok, and launched the "Garden in the City" project in 1991, When the compulsory land acquisition program failed to yield any results, the government opted for the voluntary sale of land by integrating the development of a better living standard for the local people and environment. Phase I of the project was successfully completed from 1991 to 1999. The development of the park took place during the second phase of the project. A Green Area Management Master Plan was created between 2000 and 2004 through the Office of Natural Resources and Environmental Policy and Planning, and a park and botanic garden were constructed on an area of 148 rai of land. According to the data obtained by the Environmental Impact Assessment Bureau, 564 pieces of abandoned agricultural land that occupy an area of 1,276 rai were acquired. In 2003, 148 rai out of the acquired land was used for creating a botanical and public park. The park was established in 2003 and was given its name by King Bhumibol Adulyadej. Currently, the Royal Initiative and Special Project Bureau, The Royal Forest Department supervising the park.

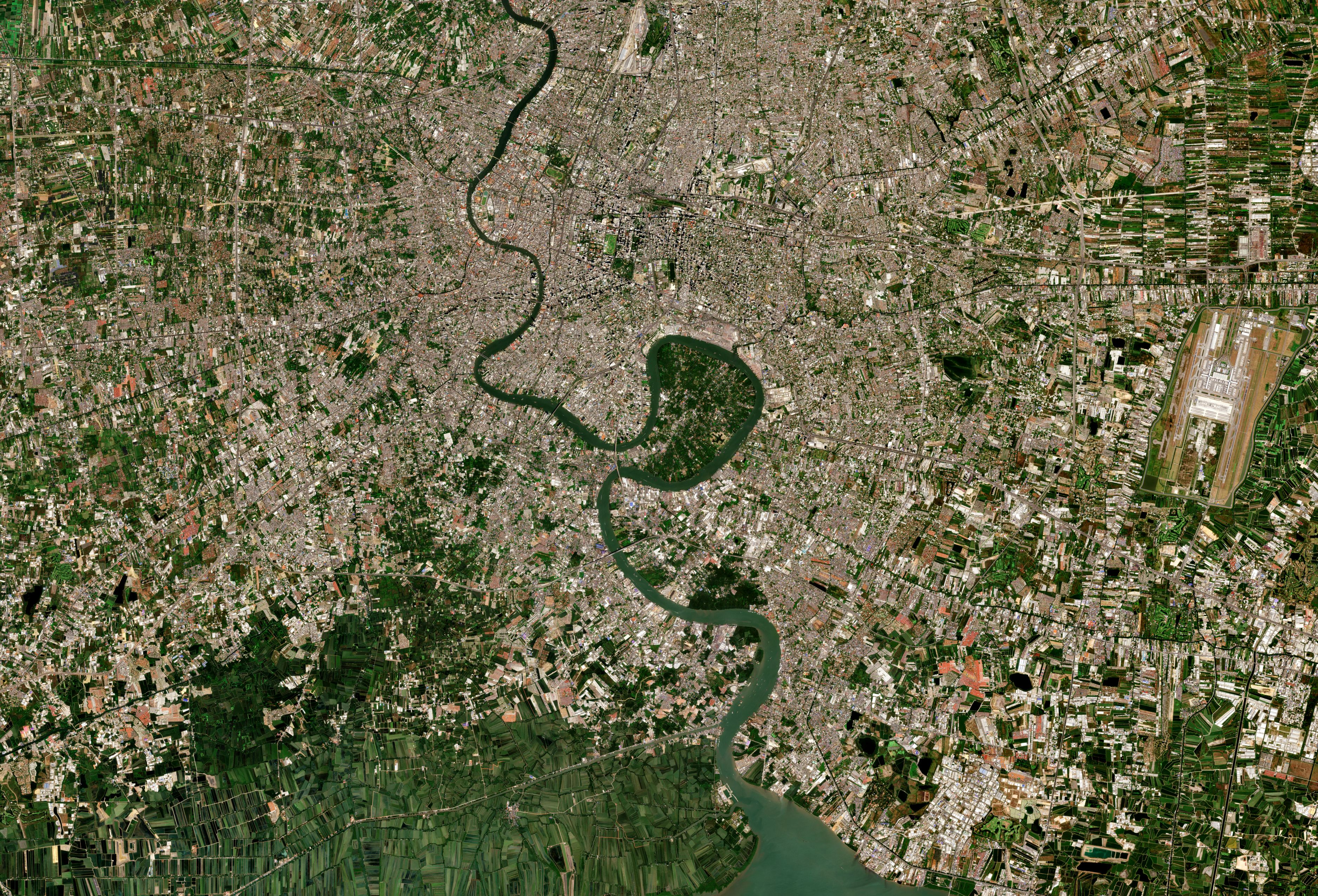
Bangkok’s green lung

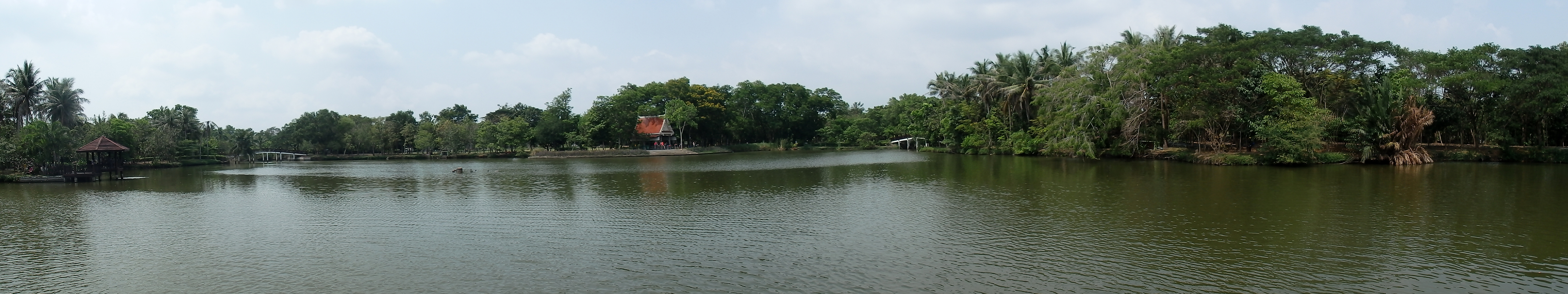

== Places and facilities ==
Si Nakhon Khuean Khan Park and Botanical Garden contains a wide range of facilities designed to support recreation, environmental education, and ecological conservation within a protected natural setting.

One of the most prominent features of the park is its cycling infrastructure, which includes a dedicated cycling track approximately 2.2 kilometres in length. This cycling track is designed to accommodate both casual riders and experienced cyclists. The track is surrounded by dense vegetation which provide shading for the park visitors.

In addition to cycling paths, the park features an extensive network of walking and jogging trails that allow visitors to explore different sections of the landscape. These trails are designed to minimize environmental impact by following existing natural contours and avoiding sensitive ecological areas. The paths are often elevated in certain sections to prevent soil erosion and protect wetland ecosystems beneath them.

Wetlands and water features play a significant role in the park’s design and ecological function. Several ponds and interconnected water systems are present throughout the park, supporting aquatic life and contributing to biodiversity. These water bodies also act as natural cooling systems and help regulate microclimates within the park.

Observation towers and viewing platforms are strategically located to provide visitors with panoramic views of the surrounding landscape. These structures are particularly important for birdwatching, as they allow visitors to observe wildlife without disturbing natural habitats.

Open green spaces within the park provide areas for relaxation, picnics, and informal recreational activities. These spaces are carefully maintained to preserve vegetation while accommodating public use.

Public amenities such as restrooms, seating areas, and parking facilities are available. These facilities are integrated into the environment in a way that minimizes visual and ecological disruption.

Educational zones and interpretive signage are also present throughout the park.

== Venues and events ==
Si Nakhon Khuean Khan Park serves as an important venue for a variety of recreational, educational, and community-based activities. Its accessibility and natural setting make it a popular destination for both organized events and informal gatherings.

Cycling is one of the most prominent activities associated with the park. Organized cycling events and group rides frequently take place, attracting participants from across the Bangkok metropolitan region. The park’s cycling infrastructure supports these activities by providing safe and well-maintained routes.

In addition to cycling, the park is widely used for jogging, walking, and general fitness activities. Visitors often engage in morning and evening exercise routines, taking advantage of the park’s clean air and natural surroundings.

Group exercise sessions, including aerobics and yoga, are commonly held in open areas of the park. These activities are typically informal but contribute to community engagement and public health.

Educational programs represent another important use of the park. Schools and universities frequently organize field trips to the park, where students can learn about ecosystems, biodiversity, and environmental conservation. These programs often involve guided tours and hands-on activities.

Environmental awareness campaigns are also conducted within the park. These initiatives aim to promote sustainable practices and increase public understanding of environmental issues.

Birdwatching events are particularly popular due to the park’s rich biodiversity. Enthusiasts gather to observe both resident and migratory bird species.

The park also hosts small-scale cultural and community events. These may include local festivals, community gatherings, and informal celebrations.

== Managing park facilities ==
The management of Si Nakhon Khuean Khan Park involves cooperation between government agencies, environmental organizations, and local communities. The primary objective of park management is to maintain a balance between public accessibility and environmental conservation.

Regular maintenance is conducted to ensure the safety and usability of facilities. This includes upkeep of cycling tracks, walking paths, and public amenities.

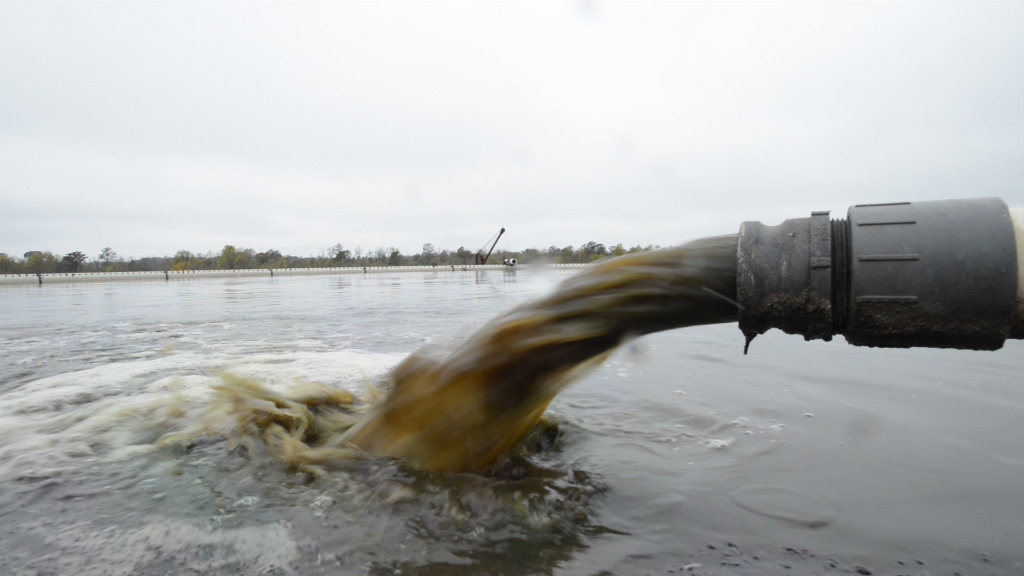
Waste water pipe

Waste management systems are implemented throughout the park to minimize environmental impact. Visitors are encouraged to dispose of waste responsibly and participate in conservation efforts.

Conservation programs are a key component of park management. These programs include habitat restoration, biodiversity monitoring, and protection of native plant species.

Collaboration with academic institutions supports research and environmental monitoring activities. These partnerships contribute to a better understanding of ecological processes within the park.

Community participation is also encouraged through volunteer programs and environmental initiatives. Local residents play an active role in maintaining and protecting the park.

== Environmental role and case studies ==
Si Nakhon Khuean Khan Park plays a critical role in improving environmental conditions in the Bangkok metropolitan region. The park contributes to air quality improvement by absorbing pollutants and producing oxygen. Vegetation within the park acts as a carbon sink, helping to mitigate climate change. Studies indicate that urban green spaces can significantly reduce carbon dioxide levels.

The park also contributes to temperature regulation by reducing the urban heat island effect. Shaded areas and water features create cooler microclimates. Wetlands within the park play an important role in water management. They help regulate water flow and reduce the risk of flooding.

A key case study involves forest restoration efforts within the park. These efforts have increased plant diversity and improved ecosystem resilience. Environmental education programs have also had measurable impacts. Participants demonstrate increased awareness of conservation practices.

== PTTEP commitment ==
PTT Exploration and Production (PTTEP) has implemented various initiatives aimed at reducing environmental impacts and supporting community development. Forest Reforestation was done for Eco-learning at Sri Nakhon Khuean Khan Park Project, located in Bang Kachao in Samut Prakan Province, Thailand. The project was launched in 2013 in accordance with an initiative of Princess Maha Sirindhorn.

The initiative focused on restoring approximately 40 rai of forest within the Sri Nakhon Khuean Khan Park and Botanical Garden and transforming the area into an eco-learning site designed as a natural classroom.

In addition to environmental restoration, PTTEP has organized the Youth Guide Training program for local students. The program aims to build community networks and increase awareness of the ecological importance of Bang Kachao, often described as a forested green space within the urban environment.

PTTEP has also conducted a Social Return on Investment (SROI) assessment of the project. This analysis evaluates the social impact of the initiative by monetizing social outcomes and comparing them with the financial investment made in the program.

== Wildlife ==
Si Nakhon Khuean Khan Park supports a diverse range of wildlife due to its varied ecosystems. These ecosystems include forests, wetlands, and aquatic habitats.

Bird species are particularly abundant, with over 100 species recorded. Both resident and migratory birds use the park as a habitat. Common species include kingfishers, bulbuls, and egrets. These birds play important roles in ecosystem functioning.

Reptiles such as water monitors are commonly observed. These animals help regulate populations of smaller species.

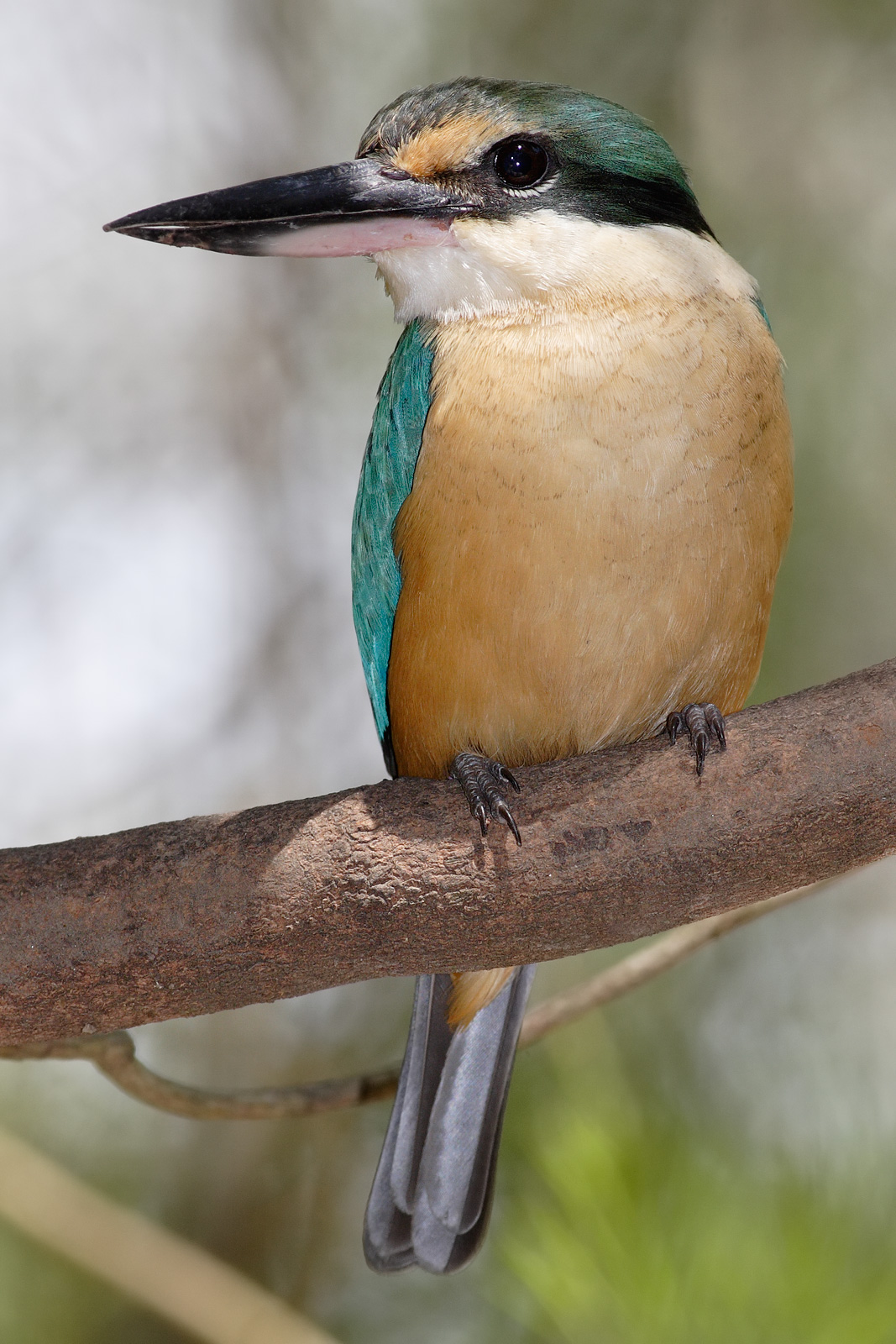
kingfishers

Amphibians and insects contribute to biodiversity and ecological balance. Small mammals such as squirrels are also present.

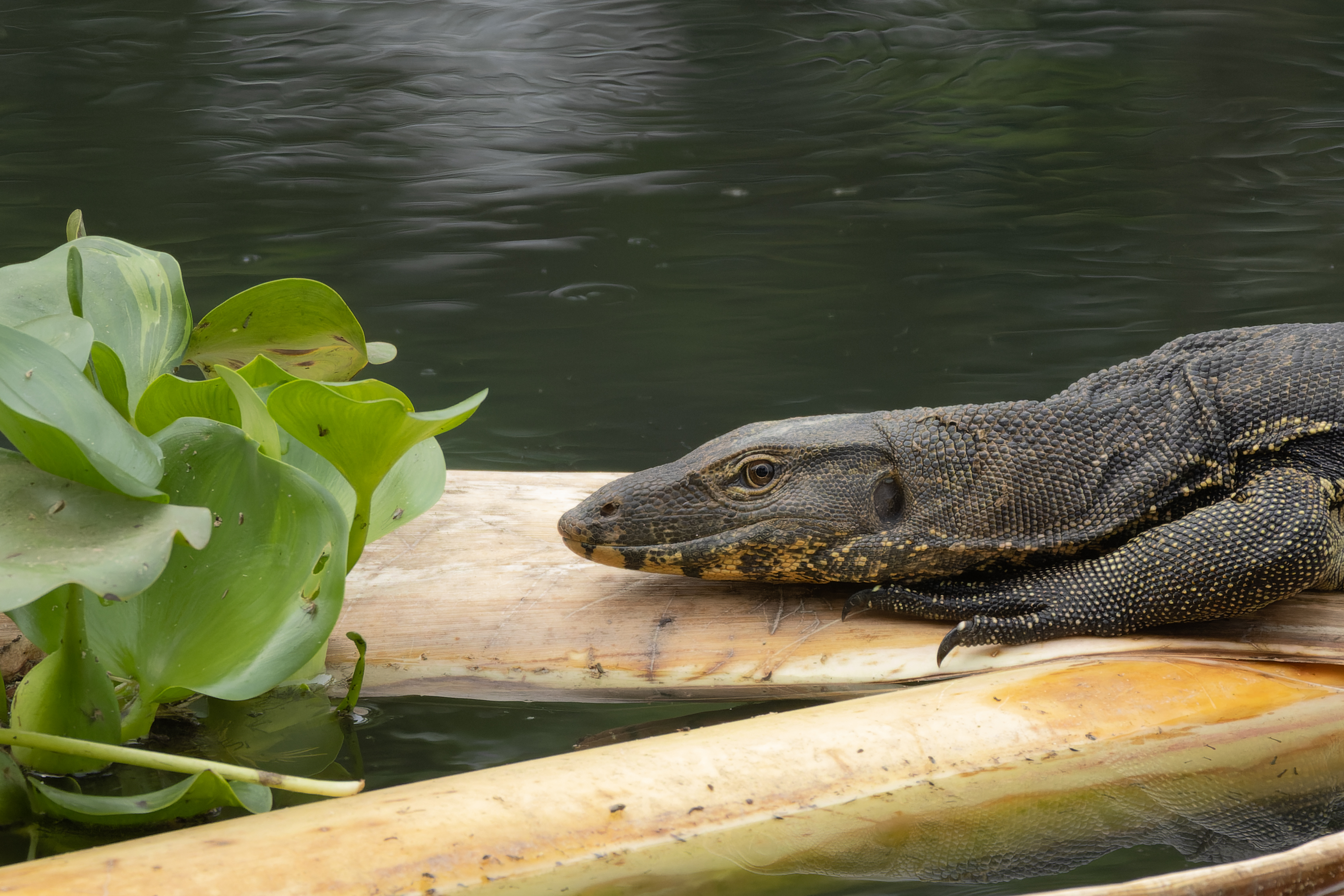
water monitors

Aquatic ecosystems support fish and other organisms. These habitats are essential for maintaining biodiversity.

The park functions as a breeding ground and refuge for wildlife. Conservation measures help protect these species.
