= Nawaminthrachinuthit Bodindecha School =

Coordinates: 13°47′32″N 100°36′21″E

- โรงเรียนนวมินทราชินูทิศ บดินทรเดชา
- 5/23 Soi Ladphrao 69, Ladphrao road, Saphan Song, Wangthonglang District, Bangkok

Information
- Other name: NMR.B.D.
- Type: Public highschool
- Established: 31 July 1992
- School district: Wangthonglang
- School code: 011334302
- Director: Mrs. Raweewun Lekhanavin
- Grades: 7–12
- Campus size: 6 Acres (15 ไร่)
- Campus type: Urban
- Colors: Light blue and navy blue
- Affiliation: Office of the basic Education Commission (สํานักงานคณะการศึกษาขั้นพื้นฐาน) , Ministry of Education (กระทรวงศึกษาธิการ)
- Website: http://www.bodin3.ac.th

Nawaminthrachinuthit Bodindecha School (Thai: "โรงเรียนนวมินทราชินูทิศ บดินทรเดชา") is a public school in downtown Bangkok, Thailand. The school admits students grades 7 to 12.

Nawaminthrachinuthit Bodindecha School is one of nine schools founded to honour Her Majesty the Queen on her sixtieth anniversary. The school is the third of the Bodindecha school group.

== About the school ==
=== History ===
Nawaminthrachinuthit Bodindecha School (Thai: โรงเรียนนวมินทราชินูทิศ บดินทรเดชา)is one of the nine schools founded to honour Her Majesty the Queen on her sixtieth birthday. It was founded on July 31, 1992. At the beginning, the school was managed by Khunying Lakkana Saengsanit (คุณหญิงลักขณา แสงสนิท), the then director of Bodindecha (Sing Singhaseni) School (โรงเรียนบดินทรเดชา (สิงห์ สิงหเสนี)). Nawaminthrachinuthit means devotion to the queen of the 9th King. Bodindecha is taken from the name of Army General Chao Phraya Bodindecha, who is also known as Singh(สิงห์), or simply Sing, from his family name of Singhaseni (สิงหเสนี). During the reign of Chakri dynasty King Rama III (พระบาทสมเด็จพระนั่งเกล้าเจ้าอยู่หัว 1824–1851), General Singh led an army from Bangkok to put down the rebellion of Lord Anouvong of Vientiane (ปราบกบฎ เจ้าอนุวงศ์ เวียงจันทน์) (1826–1828).

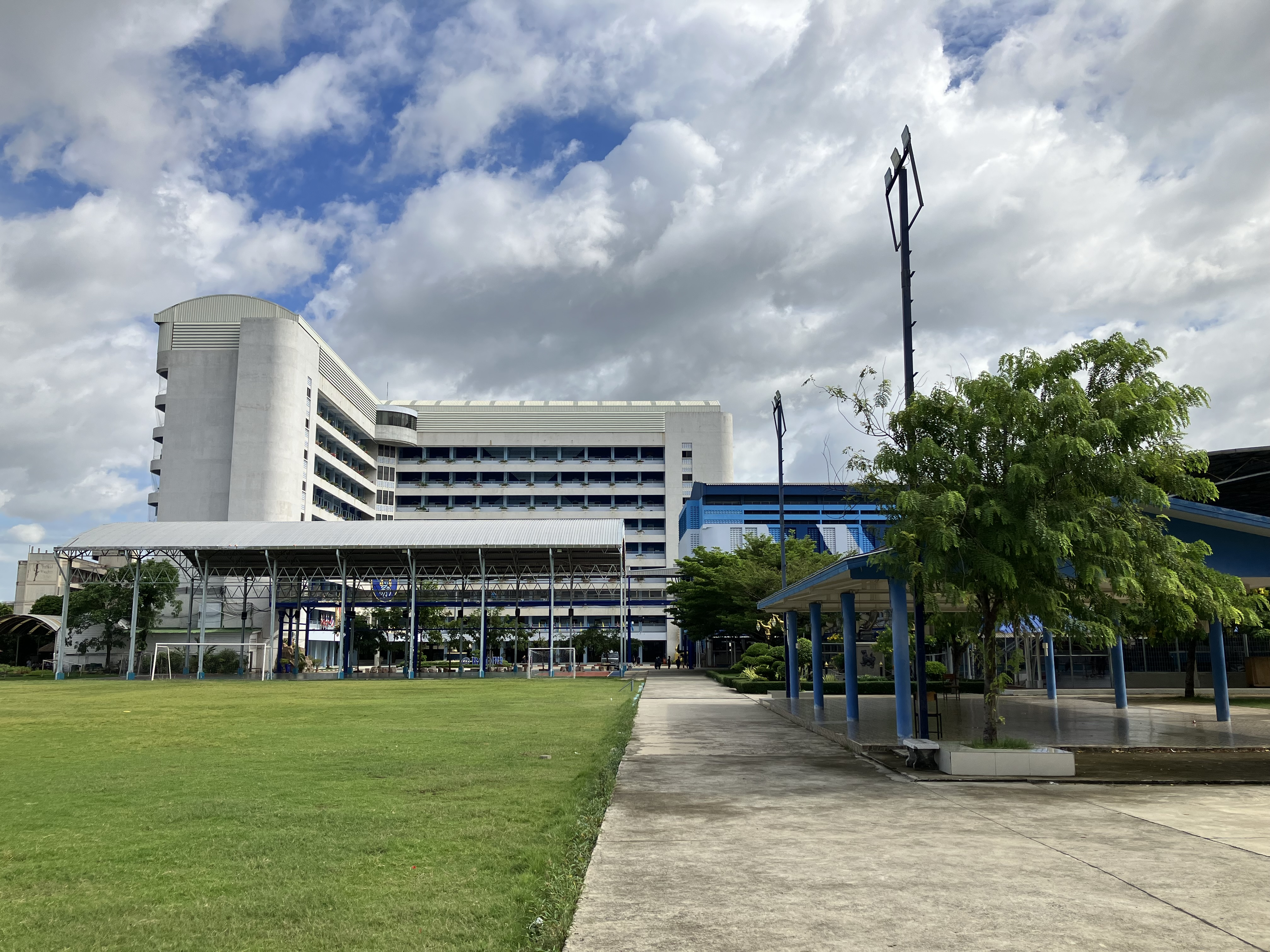
The 9 Stories Building

The school received the 'Outstanding Secondary School Award' from the Department of General Education in 1996.

The school is an ISO 9002 standard organization and received its certificate in 1999.

=== The school ===
- Tree (flora): Nine Gullapraphruks (9 Wishing Trees)
- Area: 6 Acres (15 ไร่)
- Number of classes: 62
- Number of students: 2000+

== English Program (EP) ==
The program equips the students with literacy and numeracy through the study of English, Science, Information and Communication Technology (ICT), Health Science and Phvsical Education(PE).

=== School facilities ===
- Audio
- Visual
- Computer and LAN system
- Video
- Science labs
- Books
- Printing
- Photocopying
- Cd’s
- Library
- Computer room (120 computers for students study)
- Internet Room (25 computers for students use)
- E-learning center (60 computers)
- Overhead projector and ceiling electric fan in every classroom
- Learning center with LCD projector in every department
- Canteen
- Assembly Hall
- Mini theater and music room
- Herbs and botanical garden
- Sports fields for soccer, basketball, volleyball, badminton and table tennis

== Directors ==
- Mr. Amornrat Pin-ngern, first director, 1992 - 1998
- Mr. Palongyoot Indhapan, second director, 1998 - 2002
- Mrs. Pornpat Sitthiwong, third director, 2002 - 2005
- Mr. Jamlong Chey-Aksorn, fourth director, 2006 - 2008
- Mr. Chonan Maroottawong, fifth director, 2008 - 2011
- Dr. Salinee Meecharoen, sixth director, 2011-2013
- Mrs. Pornpimol Pornchanarak, seventh director, 2013 - 2015
- Mrs. Suchada Phuttanimon, eight director, 2015 - 2017
- Mr. Manus Pinnikorn, ninth director, 2017 - 2020
- Mr. Surasit Charoenwai, tenth director, 2020 - 2021
- Mr. Midchai Somsumrankoon, eleventh director, 2021 - 2025
- Mrs. Raweewun Lekhanavin, twelfth director, 2025 - current
