= Chaophraya Bodindecha =

Chaophraya Bodindecha (Sing Sinhaseni)
- เจ้าพระยาบดินทรเดชา (สิงห์ สิงหเสนี)
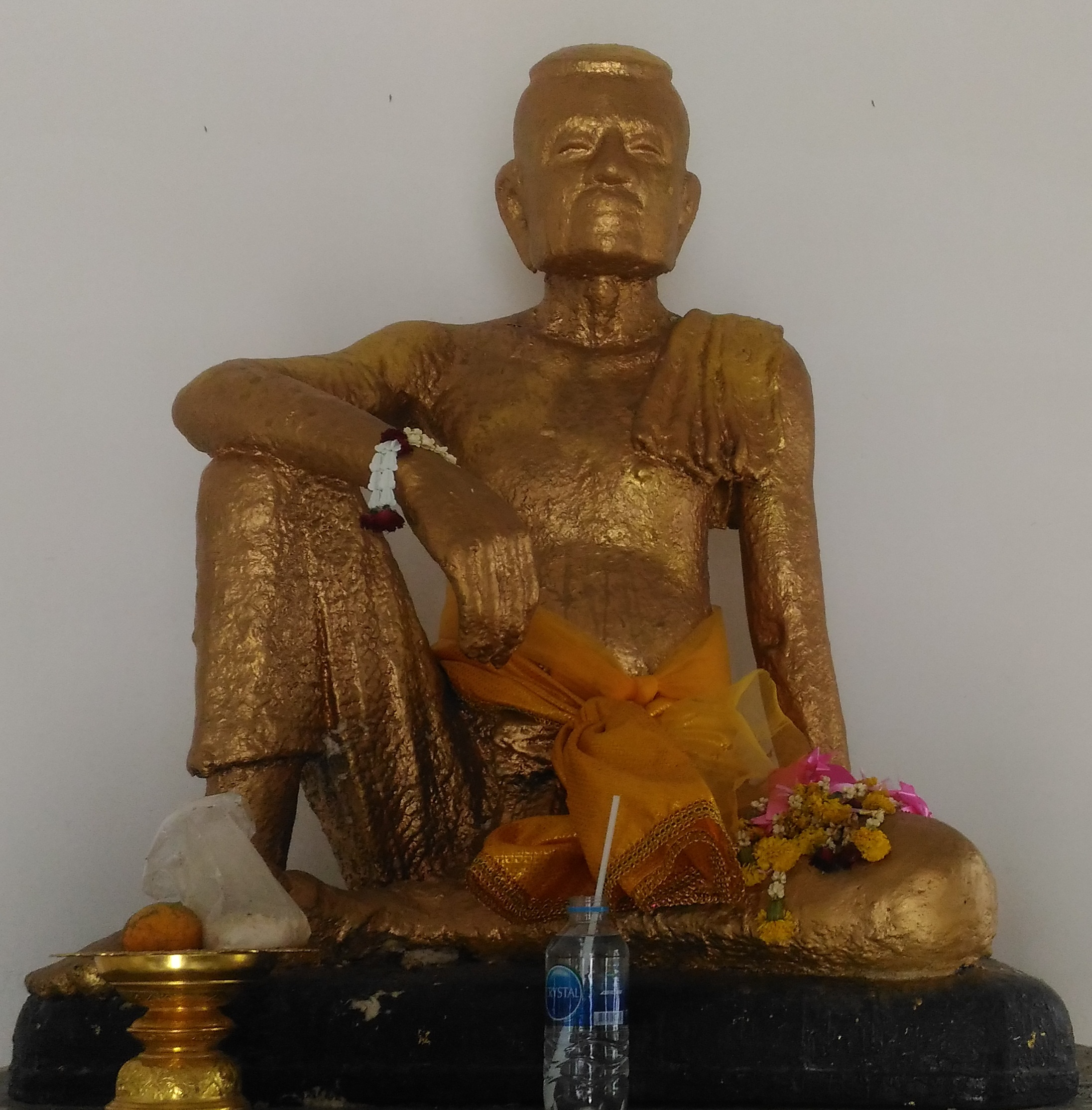
- Statue of Chaophraya Bodindecha (Sing Sinhaseni) at Wat Chakkrawat Ratchawat, Bangkok

Samuha Nayok (Prime Minister for Northern Siam and Chancellor of Civil Affairs)
- In office 1827–1849
- Monarch: Rama III
- Preceded by: Chaophraya Aphaiphuthon
- Succeeded by: Chaophraya Nikonbodin

Personal details
- Born: 13 January 1776 Phra Nakhon, Bangkok, Siam
- Died: 24 June 1849 (aged 73) Samphanthawong, Bangkok, Siam
- Spouse: Lady Peng
- Children: Chaophraya Mukkhamontri (Ket Sinhaseni); Chaophraya Yommarat (Kaeo Sinhaseni)
- Parents: Chaophraya Aphairacha Pin (father); Lady Fug (mother)

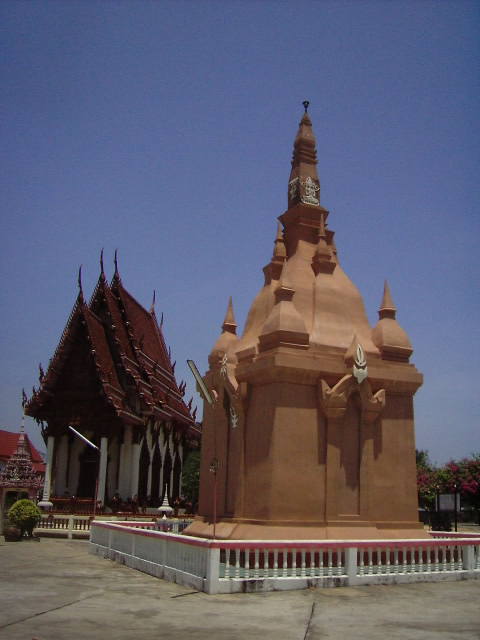
Pagoda at Wat Tung Sawang Chaiyaphum, Yasothon Province, marking campsite of Chaophraya Bodindecha's army in the Laotian Rebellion (1826–1828)

Chaophraya Bodindecha (Note: Thai: เจ้าพระยาบดินทรเดชา. In Khmer documents he appears under the name Chao Khun Bodin (Khmer: ចៅ ឃុន បឌិន). In Vietnamese sources he is referred to in two forms: Sửu Pha Họa Di (Chinese: 醜頗禍移), derived from his rank as Phraya/Chaophraya Ratchasuphawadi; and Phi nhã Chất tri (Chinese: 丕雅質知), which follows the customary naming style used in documents bearing the Royal Lion Seal for his office as Samuhnaay, equivalent to the Chaophraya Chakri Si Ongrak.) (13 January 1776 – 24 June 1849), personal name Sing Sinhaseni (สิงห์ สิงหเสนี), was a prominent military figure of the early Rattanakosin Kingdom period during the reign of King Rama III. Bodindecha held the post of Samuha Nayok (สมุหนายก), the Prime Minister of Northern Siam, from 1827 to 1849. He was known for his leading role in suppressing the Laotian Rebellion of King Anouvong of Vientiane (กบฏเจ้าอนุวงศ์). He also played major roles in the Siamese-Vietnamese Wars, including the 1831–1834 and 1841–1845 campaigns (อานัมสยามยุทธ). His descendants bear the surname Sinhaseni (สิงหเสนี).

== Life ==
Bodindecha was born on 13 January 1776 in modern Phra Nakhon District during the Thonburi Kingdom period, with personal name Sing (lit. "Lion"), as the fourth child to Chaophraya Aphairacha Pin. His mother was Lady Fug. His father, Chaophraya Aphairacha Pin, had served as Samuha Kalahom (สมุหกลาโหม) the Prime Minister of Southern Siam and Chancellor of Military affairs from 1805 to 1809 during the reign of King Rama I. Aphairacha had his son Sing become a royal page of Prince Isarasundhorn. The prince was later crowned as King Phutthaloetla Naphalai and Sing was transferred to the service under Prince Maha Senanurak the Front Palace. He joined his lord in the campaign against Burmese Invasion of Phuket in 1809 and rose through ranks in Front Palace Police Bureau. He was later made Phraya Kasettraraksa the Head of Agriculture Department of the Front Palace.

In 1816, during one of the royal barge processions, Bodindecha accidentally had his barges passed across in front of one of the royal barges and faced treason charges. Bodindecha was imprisoned and only through the intervention of Prince Chetsadabodin that he was pardoned and released but relieved of his positions. He went on to serve Prince Chetsadabodin in his mercantile affairs. When Prince Chetsadabodin was crowned as King Rama III in 1824, Bodindecha was made Phraya Ratchasuphawadi the Head of Krom Suratsawadi or Conscription Department.

=== Laotian Rebellion wars ===
In 1826, King Anouvong of Vientiane rebelled against Siamese rule in Lao Rebellion. Bodindecha with the title Phraya Rajasupawadi was assigned Southern Laos and the Kingdom of Champassak. Bodindecha managed to take the city of Champassak and capture King Nyô and send him to Bangkok. Chaophraya Aphaiphuthon the Samuha Nayok fell ill and died during the campaigns in 1827. King Rama III then elevated Bodindecha to Chaophraya Rajasupawadi and transferred the responsibilities of the Samuha Nayok to him. When Prince Maha Sakdiphonlasep, the leader of the campaign, returned to Bangkok, Bodindecha was left in charge in Laos. He brought the renowned Lao Buddha image Phra Bang from Vientiane to Bangkok (which would later be returned to Vientiane in 1867).

Upon his return to Bangkok, King Rama III commanded Bodindecha to return to Laos in order to completely destroy the city of Vientiane to prevent further rebellions. During this time, Emperor Minh Mạng sent Vietnamese envoys to bring Anouvong from Nghệ An Province back to Vientiane to negotiate. Anouvong, however, ambushed the Siamese garrisons and retook Vientiane. The position of Bodindecha's encampment at Nong Khai became insecure so Bodindecha decided to retreat south. Anouvong sent his son Raxavong Ngao to lead Lao army to pursue Bodindecha. Bodindecha decided to meet his enemies at Bokwan (modern Si Chiang Mai District, Nong Khai Province). Rattanakosin Chronicles of the Third Reign from 1931 gives accounts on personal engagements between Bodindecha and Raxavong Ngao in the Battle of Bokwan. Raxavong Ngao drove Bodindecha off his horse and rushed his spear at the Siamese general that narrowly missed. Raxavong Ngao then slashed Bodindecha with sword but Bodindecha's younger brother ran to aid and received the blow and died. Bodindecha took the opportunity to stab Raxavong's thigh with knife. Siamese soldiers came to rescue and shot Raxavong Ngao at his knee. Lao soldiers then carried Raxavong Ngao off the battlefield.

Bodindecha's victory at the Battle of Bokwan in 1828 caused Anouvong to flee to Xiang Khuoang. Chao Noy the ruler of Muang Phuan told Bodindecha the whereabouts of Anouvong so that Bodindecha managed to send his men to capture Anouvong and sent him as captive to Bangkok. Upon his return to Bangkok, King Rama III officially invested him with the title of Chaophraya Bodindecha the Samuha Nayok Prime Minister of Northern Siam. The title name "Bodindecha" was from the king's personal name "Chetsadabodin".

=== Siamese-Vietnamese Wars ===
In 1833, Bodindecha led Siamese armies to attack Saigon and to put the Cambodian Prince Ang Em on the throne at Oudong against the pro-Vietnamese king Ang Chan II, while his colleague Chaophraya Phraklang led the fleet. Bodindecha marched through Cambodia virtually unopposed as King Ang Chan had fled to southern Vietnam along with his court. Bodindecha joined Phraklang at Châu Đốc, An Giang Province in 1834 and they both marched the fleet along the Bassac River to Saigon. Bodindecha met the Vietnamese fleet at Vàm Nao canal in January 1834 and the Battle of Vàm Nao ensued. The Siamese were defeated and Bodindecha and Phraklang retreated to Châu Đốc. After repeated Vietnamese attacks on Châu Đốc, Bodindecha decided to retreat to Battambang, his main base.

Initial Siam's defeat enabled Nguyen dynasty to fully control Cambodia. After the death of King Ang Chan in 1834, Emperor Minh Mạng put Cambodia under direct rule led by Trương Minh Giảng. Bodindecha made Prince Ang Em the governor of Battambang and returned to Bangkok. However, Prince Ang Em switched side to Vietnam in 1838 and gave Siamese officials in Battambang to the Vietnamese. Bodindecha returned to Battambang in 1839 and in 1840 the native Cambodians rose in rebellion against Vietnamese rule. In November 1840, Bodindecha laid siege on Pursat and managed to obtain peaceful surrender. The Vietnamese had retreated from Cambodia to An Giang Province by 1841. Bodindecha then sent Ang Im's younger brother Prince Ang Duong to Oudong as a candidate for Cambodian throne. Bodindecha returned to Bangkok in 1845.

The Vietnamese, however, renewed their attacks in May 1845 and took Phnom Penh. Bodindecha hurriedly marched to Oudong to defend. Nguyễn Văn Chương led the Vietnamese armies to lay siege on Oudong in September 1845. After some fightings and stand-offs, both sides agreed to negotiate. After five-month-long siege, Nguyễn Văn Chương lifted the siege and went back to An Giang. It was agreed that Prince Ang Duong was to be crowned and tributes would be sent to both Siam and Vietnam. Bodindecha presented the royal regalia granted by King Rama III to Ang Duong and crowned him as the King of Cambodia in 1848.

Chaophraya Bodindecha was known as Sửu Pha Họa Di (chữ Hán: 醜頗禍移) and Phi nhã Chất tri (chữ Hán: 丕雅質知) in Vietnamese sources.

== Final years and death ==
After many years in Cambodia, Bodindecha finally returned to Bangkok in 1848. On his way to Bangkok, Bodindecha met Phraklang again at Chachoengsao where the Teochew societies had rioted and took over the city. Bodindecha supported Phraklang in his subjugation of Chinese rioters and they together returned to Bangkok. One year after his return to Bangkok, on 24 June 1849, Bodindecha died during the Cholera epidemic, aged 73, at his residence near modern Sampheng, Samphanthawong District. King Rama III sponsored his cremation in 1850 at Wat Saket.

== Family and Issue ==
Bodindecha had several wives, as per the contemporary practice of the era. His main wife was Lady Peng, daughter of Phra Phiphitsali. Official genealogy of Sinhaseni family recognizes his seventeen children but it is believed that he had up to twenty-three children, some of them unrecorded. His notable children include;

- Ket (1801–1869) fourth child, born to Lady Peng. He was made Chaophraya Mukkhamontri in 1855. He had nine children.
- Kaeo (1804–1871) seventh child, born to Lady Peng. He was made Phra Promborrirak of the Police Bureau in the reign of King Rama III. He served his father during the Siamese-Vietnamese Wars in 1841 and 1845. He led Prince Ang Duong to Oudong in 1841 and defended Phnom Penh against the Vietnamese in 1845. During the reign of King Mongkut, he was made the governor of Nakhon Ratchasima and in 1865 was made Chaophraya Yommaraj the Head of Police Bureau. He had nine recorded children.
- Klib, ninth child, born to Lady Nu. She became Chao Chom or minor consort to King Rama III.
- Malai, eleventh child. She became Chao Chom or minor consort to King Rama III.

== Legacy ==
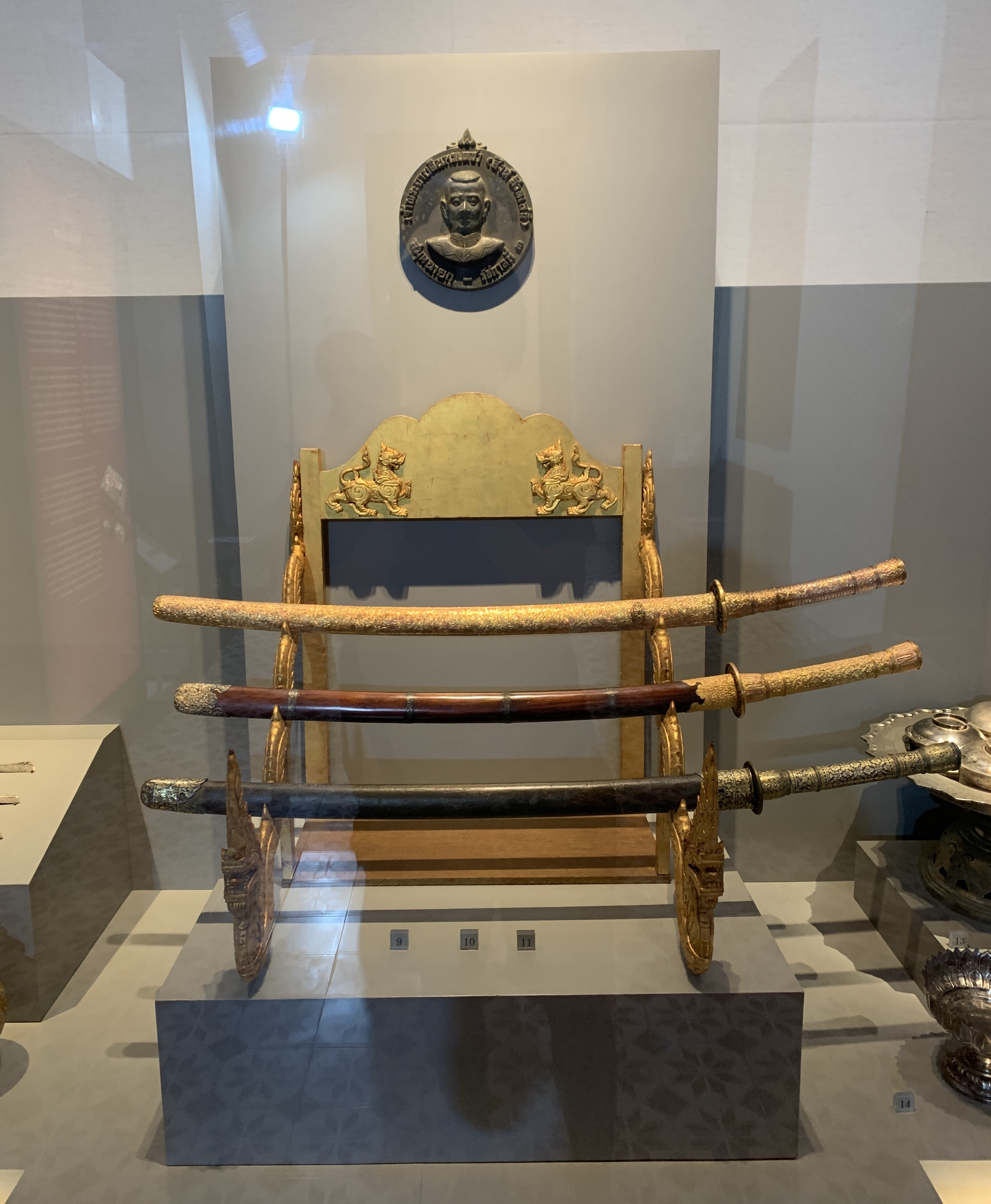
The sword of Chaophraya Bodindecha, Bangkok National Museum

Partial list of locations named in his honor or associated with him:

- Chaophraya Bodindecha (Sing Sinhaseni) Museum
- Bodindecha (Sing Singhaseni) School, Bangkok
- Bodindecha (Sing Singhaseni) 2, Bangkok
- Nawaminthrachinuthit Bodindecha School, Bangkok
- Bodindecha (Sing Singhaseni) 4 School, Bangkok
- Bodindecha (Sing Singhaseni) Nonthaburi School, Nonthaburi
- Bodindecha (Sing Singhaseni) Samutprakarn School, Samutprakarn
- Camp Bodindecha (ค่ายบดินทรเดชา), Ban Doet (บ้านเดิด), Tambon Doet, Amphoe Mueang Yasothon; home to the Royal Thai Army 16th Infantry Regiment (กรมทหารราบที่ ๑๖) since 23 December 1985. 15.907329°N 104.061321°E

== See also ==
- Military history of Thailand
