= Lat Luang =

Lat Luang ลัดหลวง
- Town Municipality
- Location in Bangkok Metropolitan Region
- Coordinates: 13°37′48″N 100°31′49″E
- Country: Thailand
- Province: Samut Prakan
- District: Phra Pradaeng

Population (2014)
  - Total: 73,938
- Time zone: UTC+7 (ICT)
- Area code: (+66) 34

Lat Luang (Thai: ลัดหลวง) is a town (Thesaban Mueang) in the Phra Pradaeng District (Amphoe) of Samut Prakan Province in the Bangkok Metropolitan Region of Central Thailand. In 2014, it had a total population of 73,938 people.
