= Bang Kachao =

Artificial island in Thailand

Coordinates: 13.6807°N 100.5663°E

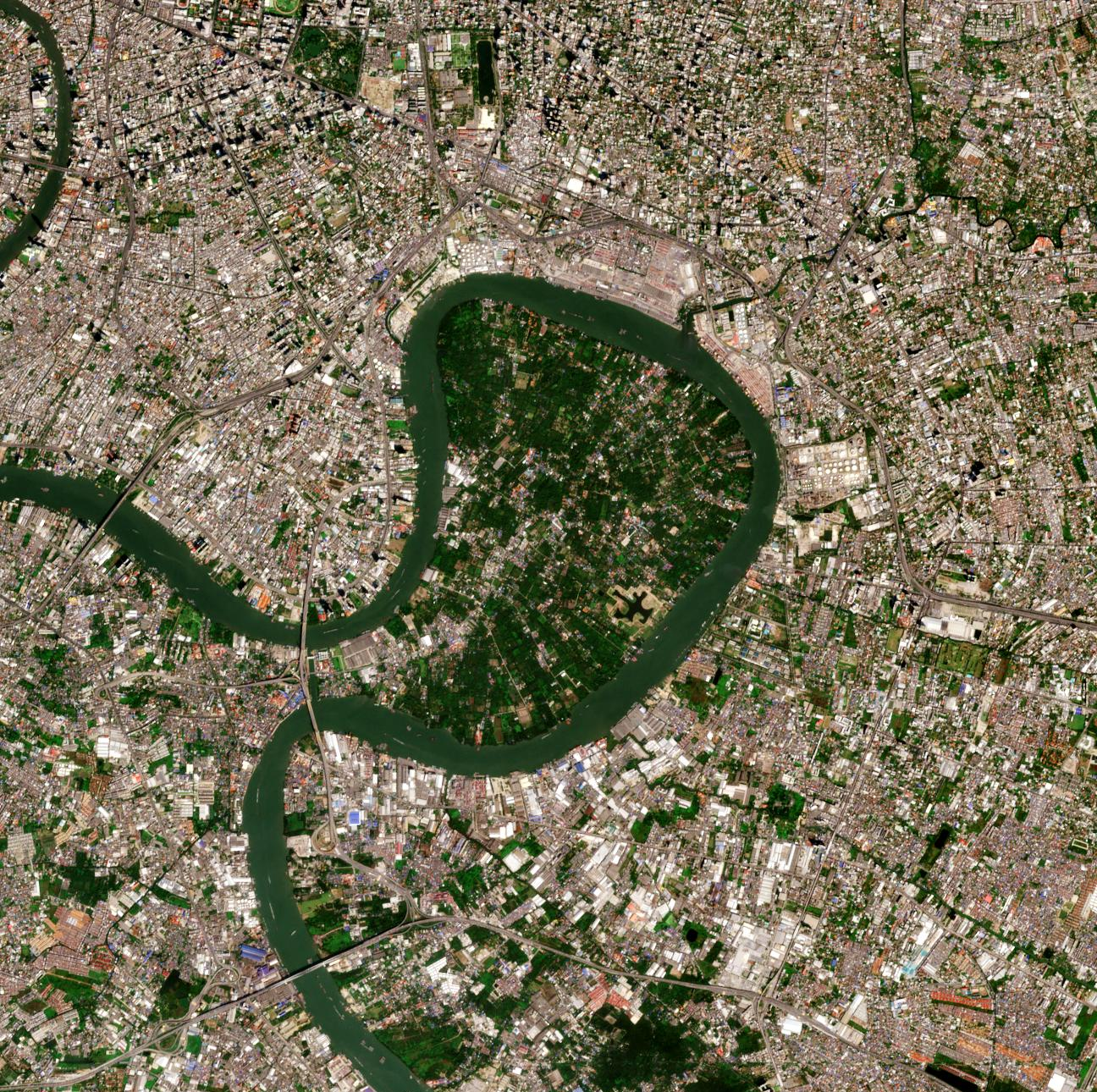
Bang Kachao as captured by the Copernicus Sentinel-2B satellite

Bang Kachao (Thai: บางกะเจ้า, Thai pronunciation: [bāːŋ kàʔ.tɕâw]) (Note: Also known as Bang Krachao (บางกระเจ้า), although this is a misnomer, as Bang Krachao is the name of a different sub-district in Mueang Samut Sakhon District.), is an artificial island formed by a bend in the Chao Phraya River and a canal at its western end. The entire area is also known as the Green Lung. It lies south of the Thai capital Bangkok in Phra Pradaeng District of Samut Prakan Province. The island, covering 16 square kilometres (6.2 sq mi) or 12,000 rai (1,920 hectares) has been traditionally agricultural with only a relatively small population. It is sometimes referred to as the "green lung" of Bangkok". In 2006, Bang Kachao was named "best urban oasis" by Time in its "Best of Asia" series and is frequented by nature lovers and cyclists.

== Administration ==
Bang Kachao includes six sub-districts (tambons): Bang Namphueng, Bang Kachao, Bang Yo, Bang Krasop, Bang Ko Bua, and Song Khanong.

== Development ==
The island's unspoiled character, abundant space, and proximity to central Bangkok have made it a target of developers. A battle to save it is underway. Following the death of King Bhumibol in October 2016, the military government declared its intention to preserve Bang Kachao. A three-year project by the Royal Forestry Department, Kasetsart University, and oil company PTT aims to renovate public green spaces and ensure that 60 percent of the island remains free of development. "The difficulty in...Thailand, where land is in short supply and corruption rampant, is [that] developers and powerful businesses...circumvent, or simply ignore, environmental protections." Despite misgivings, one resident sold her family's 6,000 m^{2} landholding for as much as 24 million baht (US$686,106).

== Si Nakhon Khuean Khan Park and Botanical Garden ==
The Si Nakhon Khuean Khan Park and Botanical Garden is located in the northern part of Bang Kachao. It is a public park and botanical garden. This site is a visitor attraction with biking and birdwatching.
