= Chatusadom =

Governance system of the Ayutthaya, Thonburi, and Rattanakosin Kingdoms

Chatusadom or Catustambha (Thai: จตุสดมภ์ RTGS: Chatusadom, literally "Four Pillars" from Sanskrit Catur "Four" + Stambha "Pillars") was the Thai system of central executive governance during the Ayutthaya Kingdom, Thonburi Kingdom and Rattanakosin Kingdom from 1454 to 1892. For about four hundred years, it had served as the constitution of central government of Siam or Thailand until King Chulalongkorn organized Chatusadom into modern ministries and officially established the Cabinet on April 1, 1892.

== The Chatusadom system ==
King Trailokanat promulgated the constitution of Chatusadom in his Palatine Law, or Phra aiyakan tamnaeng na phonlaruean (Thai: พระไอยการตำแหน่งนาพลเรือน), with the promulgation date being 1454. The original written law had been lost, however. Chatusadom went through subsequent amendments over time and King Rama I enacted the Palatine Law in the Three Seals Law, from which the Chatusadom was mostly studied.

The Chatusadom bureaucracy was divided into Phonlaruean (Thai: พลเรือน) or Civil Affairs and Thahan (Thai: ทหาร) or Military Affairs. Chatusadom was led by two Prime Ministers, alternatively Grand Chancellors (Thai: อัครมหาเสนาบดี) who held the rank of Chaophraya.

Post Name	Title Name	Office Name	Seal	Duties
Samuhanayok (Thai: สมุหนายก)	Chaophraya Chakkri (Thai: เจ้าพระยาจักรี)	Krom Mahatthai (Thai: กรมมหาดไทย)	The Seal of the Lion or the Rajasiha Seal	oversaw Phonlaruean or Civil Affairs all over the kingdom including the Four Ministries.
Samuhakalahom (Thai: สมุหกลาโหม)	Chaophraya Mahasena (Thai: เจ้าพระยามหาเสนา), alternatively Phraya Kalahom (Thai: พระยากลาโหม)	Krom Kalahom (Thai: กรมกลาโหม)	Gajasiha Seal	oversaw Military affairs.

Below Samuhanayok in Civil affairs were the Four Ministries, from which Chatusadom's name was derived. Each ministry was led by a Senabodi or Minister who held the rank of Phraya and each ministry had a Thai and a Sanskrit-derived name.

Office Name	Title name	Seal	Duties
Krommawiang (Thai: กรมเวียง) or Nakhonban (Thai: นครบาล) from Sanskrit Nagara "City" + Pala "protector"	Phraya Yommarat (Thai: พระยายมราช)	"Yama Riding Lion" Seal	The Police Bureau; guarded cities. Also occasionally led troops into foreign wars.
Krommawang (Thai: กรมวัง) or Thammathikon (Thai: ธรรมาธิกรณ์) from Sanskrit Dhamma "Law" + Adikara "authority"	Phraya Thammathibodi (Thai: พระยาธรรมาธิบดี)	"Shiva Riding Nandi" Seal	Ministry of Palatial Affairs. Oversaw the ceremonies of the palace and Buddhist religious affairs. Oversaw legal matters and trials. Also responsibled for assigning the "Yokkrabats" (similar to Magistrates) to the farther provinces.
Krommakhlang (Thai: กรมคลัง) or Kosathibodi (Thai: โกษาธิบดี) from Sanskrit Kosa "Pocket" + Adhipati "Lord"	Phraya Sithammarat (Thai: พระยาศรีธรรมราช) also Phraya Kosathibodi (Thai: พระยาโกษาธิบดี), colloquially as Phraya Phrakhlang (Thai: พระยาพระคลัง)	The Lotus Seal	Ministry of Treasury and Taxation. In later period when Siam had established trade with foreign nations the Minister also oversaw Trade and Foreign Affairs. Known to Westerners as "Phrakhlang" or "Barcalon" and other derived terms.
Krommana (Thai: กรมนา) or Kasettrathibodi (Thai: เกษตราธิบดี) from Sanskrit Ksetra "Field" + Adhipati "Lord"	Phraya Phonlathep (Thai: พระยาพลเทพ)	Nine different seals used in different occasions.	Ministry of Agriculture. Oversaw land ownership and rice storage.

These four ministers were collectively called Wiang-Wang-Khlang-Na (Thai: เวียงวังคลังนา). The Senabodi ministers of the Four Ministries held the rank of Phraya in the Ayutthaya period. However, during the late Ayutthaya and Bangkok period the ranks of these ministers rose to Chaophraya.

The yokkrabat (Thai: ยกกระบัตร) was an official of the palace administration appointed to reside in provincial towns and oversee legal affairs. It was a long-established official post of administrative importance. Yokkrabat acted as the king's representative in legal matters, supervising adjudication and reporting on the conduct of governors and officials. In some contexts, the office functioned similarly to the head of a provincial court and a deputy to the governor. During the late nineteenth and early twentieth centuries, the traditional office was gradually replaced by a modern prosecution service, and in 1916 the title yokkrabat was formally abolished and replaced by public prosecutors under the Ministry of Justice.

== History and subsequent amendments ==
The Four Ministries of Chatusadom or Wiang-Wang-Khlang-Na had existed in Ayutthaya before 1455. Each ministry was called Krom and the ministers held the rank of Khun. The chancellor of the executives in Early Ayutthaya was called Senabodi (Thai: เสนาบดี from Sanskrit Senapati) who oversaw the Ministries. King Trailokanat organized and institutionalized the Four Ministries into bureaucratic apparatus in the Palatine Law of 1454. The Four Ministers were raised to the rank of Phraya and the Ministries were given Sanskrit-derived names. The executives was led by two prime ministers; the Samuhanayok and the Samuhakalahom, who performed administrative duties on behalf of the king in Civil and Military Affairs, respectively. The officials were divided into Civil and Military divisions. However, as time progressed, the distinction between Civil and Military divisions became blurred and all official including Civil officials were expected to perform military duties especially during the wars. The two prime ministers and four ministers had their own offices and each office had a long list of functionaries.

After King Trailokanat, auxiliary departments were added to the apparatus to meet the demands. King Ramathibodi II established the Krom Phra Suratsawadi (Thai: กรมพระสุรัสวดี) or the Registration Department in 1518 to specifically oversee the census of manpower for more efficient levy and conscription. After the conclusion of a trade treaty with the Portuguese in 1511, Phra Khlang Sinkha (Thai: พระคลังสินค้า) or Royal Warehouse was established within the Ministry of Treasury to deal with foreign trades, in which the royal court held the monopoly. In the seventeenth century, the trade with Western nations grew and the Krommatha (Thai: กรมท่า) or the Ministry of Pier, formerly a department within the Ministry of Treasury, rose to importance and the term Krommatha became quite synonymous with Krommakhlang.

The position of Samuhakalahom had grown powerful by the mid-Ayutthaya period as he controlled military forces. Okya Kalahom Suriyawongse the Samuha Kalahom usurped the throne and ascended as King Prasat Thong in 1629. The power imbalance and potential threat from some ministers led the kings to reconsider and amend the Chatusadom bureaucracy. King Prasat Thong transferred the Cavalry and Elephant Regiments from Samuha Kalahom to Samuha Nayok. Some kings preferred not to appoint Samuhanayok or Samuhakalahom to avoid creating powerful nobles, most notably King Narai, who instead assigned the duties and responsibilities of the two prime ministers to his ministers without officially investing them with titles and honors.

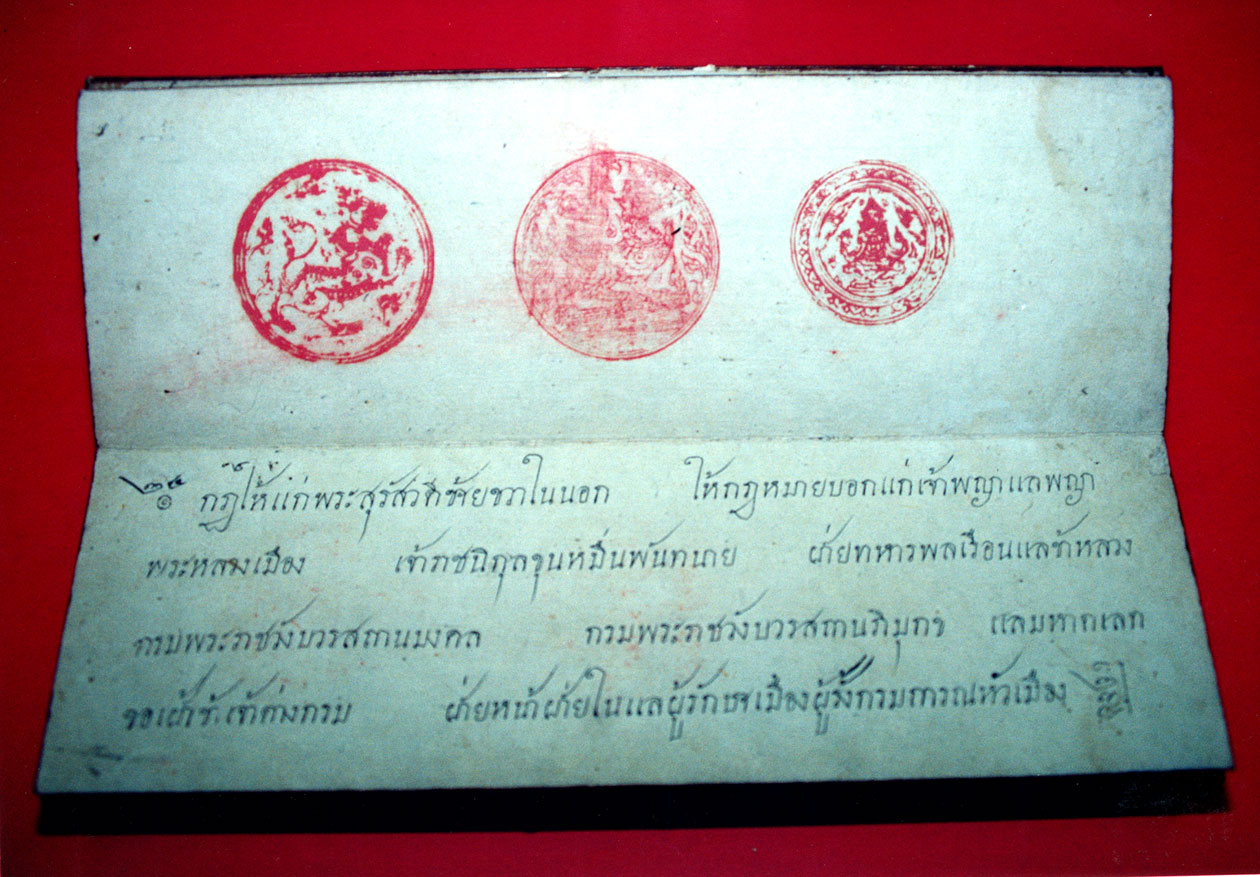
The seals of top three ministers of Siam were imprinted on the Three Seals Law, promulgated by King Rama I in 1805. Left: Rajasiha Seal of Samuhanayok Middle: Gajasiha Seal of Samuhakalahom Right: Lotus Seal of Phraklang Minister of Trade.

The greatest reform of Chatusadom came during the reign of King Phetracha. King Phetracha, who faced rebellions in Nakhon Ratchasima and Nakhon Si Thammarat that took nearly three years to quell, sought to reduce the power of regional governors. He expanded the authority of Chatusadom to the regional level and redefined the two prime ministers. The Samuha Nayok became the Prime Minister of Northern Siam in both Civil and Military affairs while the Samuha Kalahom became the Prime Minister of Southern Siam. The division between the two prime ministers went from "functional" to "regional". King Phetracha also assigned the coastal port cities to the Krommatha. Siam was then divided among the three ministers and the city governors were to report to the minister of their respective regions. The Minister of Trade or "Phraklang" also grown exceptionally powerful due to participation in foreign trades. By the eighteenth century in the Late Ayutthaya, three most powerful ministers of Siam were the Samuhanayok, the Samuhakalahom and Phraklang the Minister of Trade.

King Borommakot, who ascended the throne in 1733 after a civil war with his nephews, transferred the cities of the Samuha Kalahom who had declared neutrality in the civil war to Chaophraya Chamnanborirak the Minister of Trade who was his ardent supporter. The Southern Siamese cities were then transferred from Kalahom to Krommatha. The Samuhakalahom became a powerless figure. After the Fall of Ayutthaya in 1767, Thonburi and Rattanakosin kingdoms inherited the whole Chatusadom apparatus of the Late Ayutthaya period. King Rama I restored the Southern Siamese cities to the authority of Samuha Kalahom in 1782. The seals of top three ministers were stamped on the Three Seals Law. King Rama I who was formerly Chaophraya Chakkri the Samuha Nayok established the Chakri dynasty. The Samuhanayoks of the Rattanakosin period were then not known as "Chaophraya Chakkri", which was the generic title of Samuhanayok, but instead known from their individualized title names, most famously Chaophraya Bodindecha.

By the late nineteenth century, the Chatusadom system was inadequate for the modernizing Siam. King Chulalongkorn and Prince Damrong gradually re-organized and transformed the Chatusadom ministries into the ministries in modern, Western sense. Firstly, the Phraklang ministry was separated into the Ministry of Finance and Ministry of Foreign Affairs in 1875. Each ministry was called Krasuang (Thai: กระทรวง) instead of Krom, which became a term for subordinate departments. The reforms culminated in 1892 when King Chulalongkorn announced the official establishment of modern Cabinet comprising twelve ministries on April 1, 1892. The Krom Mahatthai of Samuhanayok became the Ministry of Interior and Krom Kalahom became the Ministry of Defence, thus ending the Chatusadom system.

== See also ==
- Thai nobility
- Sakdina
- List of samuhanayok
- List of samuhakalahom
