= Three Seals Law =

Law of Thailand

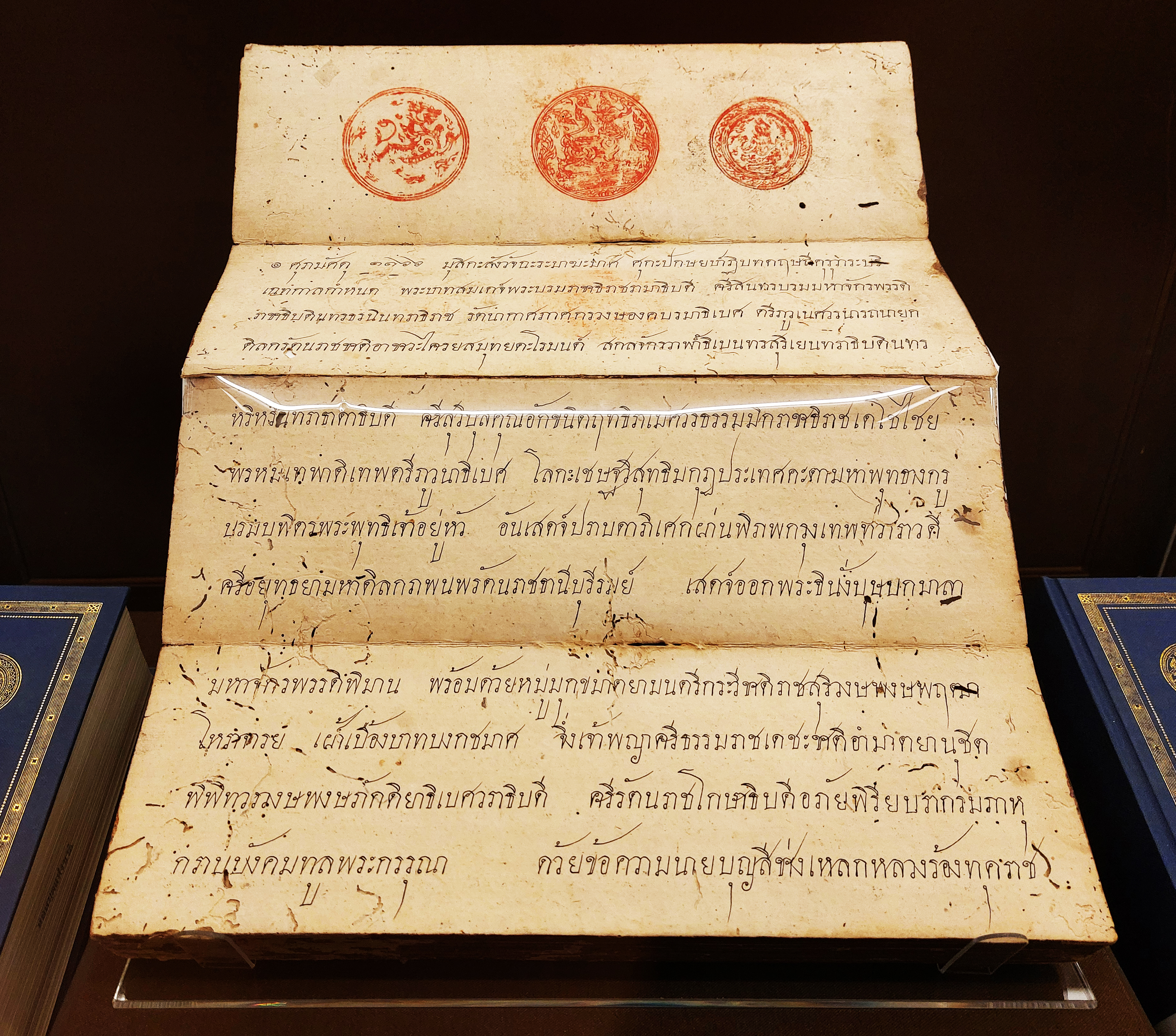
The Three Seals Law manuscript no. 41, displayed at the Bangkok National Museum.

The seals of the Mahatthai (represented by a rajasiha), Kalahom (a gajasiha) and Phrakhlang (the Bua Kaeo seal) give the law its name.

The Three Seals Law or Three Seals Code (Thai: กฎหมายตราสามดวง; RTGS: Kotmai Tra Sam Duang) is a collection of law texts compiled in 1805 on the orders of King Rama I of Siam. Most of the texts were laws from the Ayutthaya era which had survived the destruction of Ayutthaya in 1767. The compilation remained the working law of Siam until partially replaced by modern law codes in the early 20th century. The texts are an important source for the history of the Ayutthaya Kingdom and legal history in Asia.

Parts of the Three Seals Law are still in force, according to a ruling of the Supreme Court of Justice of Thailand in 1978.

== Background ==
King Rama I paid attention to the preservation of Thai texts that had survived the destruction of Ayutthaya in 1767, including the royal chronicles and religious texts. Shortly after completing a revision of the Tipiṭaka, the Buddhist canonical scriptures, in 1804, he turned his attention to the laws.

After a court awarded a divorce to a woman, Amdaeng Pom, even though she had committed adultery, her husband, Bunsi, sent a petition, claiming the judge had been biased. On examination, all copies of the marriage law showed the woman had the legal right to this divorce. Suspecting that this and others laws had been “modified,” King Rama I ordered a revision of all existing law texts:

Hence the king graciously commanded that subjects with knowledge be assigned to cleanse (chamra) the royal decrees and laws in the palace library from the Thammasat onwards; ensure they are correct in every detail according to the Pali with no inconsistencies in their content; arrange them into chapters and groups; and take pains to cleanse and adjust any aberrations to accord with justice, in keeping with the king’s gracious intent to be of benefit to kings who reign over the realm in future. (Royal preface to the Three Seals Law)

The royally appointed commission, consisting of three judges, four royal scribes, and four officials from the Department of Royal Teachers, completed the task in 11 months, producing 27 laws in a total of 41 volumes of the accordion-style book known as samut thai khao. Each law was stamped with the seals of the ministries of Mahatthai (north), Kalahom (south), and Phrakhlang (treasury), hence the name of the compilation. Three working copies were made, kept in the Royal Bedchamber, court of justice, and the Palace Library, respectively. A fourth copy was made shortly after and stored as a backup.

As a result of neglect, the volumes were lost and scattered. In 1980, a search located 80 volumes from the three original copies and 17 volumes from the backup.

Parts of the Three Seals Law were replaced by modern laws drafted with the help of foreign advisers in a Penal Code promulgated in 1908 and a Civil and Commercial Code promulgated in parts between 1923 and 1935.

In 1978, the Supreme Court of Justice of Thailand ruled that the parts of the Three Seals Law not having been replaced or overruled by any other subsequent laws remain in force still. Those parts include Lak Inthaphat (Tenets of Indra).

== Contents ==
In the table below, the laws are listed in the order they were approved in 1805 with the original titles and original Thai spelling, taken from facsimile texts published by the Royal Institute (now the Royal Society of Thailand). Some of the 27 listed texts contained multiple laws, giving a total of 41 laws. In subsequent publications, some titles were changed, and some laws amalgamated. The ‘pp’ column shows the number of pages of each law in the Khurusapha edition, as a gauge of relative length. The dates shown are as given in the prefaces of the laws. The era used for the dating of each text is in Chula Sakarat, many of these dates have clearly been corrupted during copying.

Contents of the Three Seals Law
Thai title	Transliteration	Translation	pp	date
ประกาศพระราชปรารภ	Prakat phraratchaprarop	Royal Announcement (preface)	6	1166
พระทำนูน	Phra thamnun	Royal Law	33	
พระทำนูน	phra thamnun	Royal Law	12	1544
ใช้ตราด้วยราชการ	chai tra duai ratchakan	use of official seals	21	1555
พระธรรมสาตร	Phra thammasat	Thammasat	35	-
หลักอินทภาษ	Lak inthaphat	Tenets of Indra	27	-
วิวาทด่าตี	Wiwat da ti	Dispute, Abuse, and Assault	24	1369
พระไอยการลักษณรับฟ้อง	Phra aiyakan laksana rap fong	Law on Acceptance of Cases	41	
รับฟ้อง	rap fong	acceptance of cases	10	1899
โจทกะเฉทกะ	chothakachetthaka	dismissal of cases	7	1591
ตัดสำนวน	tat samnuan	disqualification	6	-
ตัดพญาณ	tat phayan	rejection of witnesses	7	1926
ประวิงความ	prawing khwam	delay	3	-
อัญะมัญะปฎิภาศ	anyamanyapatiphat	substitution	8	-
พระไอยการลักษณกู้หนี้	Phra aiyakan laksana ku ni	Law on Credit and Debt	35	1278
มรดก	Moradok	Inheritance	38	2155, 2158
พระไอยการลักษณอุธร	Phra aiyakan laksana utthon	Law on Appeal	31	1555
พระไอยการลักษณตระลาการ	Phra aiyakan laksana tralakan	Law on Judges	51	1900
พระไอยการลักษณผัวเมีย	Phra aiyakan laksana phu mia	Law on Husband and Wife	80	1904
พระไอยการลักษณภญาน	Phra aiyakan laksana phayan	Law on Witnesses	37	1894
พระไอยการลักษณโจร	Phra aiyakan laksana chon	Law on Theft	95	1903
พระไอยการลักภาลูกเมียผู้คนท่าน บานผแนก	Phra aiyakan lakpha luk mia phu khon than ban phanaek	Law on Abduction of Children, Wives, and Dependents and Division of Persons	46	
พระไอยการลักภาลูกเมียผู้คนท่าน	lakpha luk mia phu khon than	abduction of children, wives, or dependents	20	1899
พระไอยการบานผแนก	ban phanaek	division of persons	26	1052, 1095, 1086
พระไอยการทาษ	Phra aiyakan that	Law on Slaves	59	1359, 1387, 1557, 1267
พระไอยการกระบดศึก	Phra aiyakan krabot suek	Law on Revolt and Warfare	49	
กระบด	krabot	revolt	17	1373
ศึก	suek	warfare	32	1374
กฎพระสงฆ	Kot phra song	Law on the Monkhood	65	-
พระราชบัญญัติ	Phra ratchabanyat	Royal Legislation	35	1146-1167
นาทหารหัวเมือง	Na thahan hua mueang	Military and Provincial Lists	59	-
ลักษณพีสูทดำน้ำพิสูทลุยเพลิง	Laksana phisut dam nam phisut lui phloeng	Law on Ordeal by Water or Fire	18	1899
กฎมณเทิยรบาล	Kot monthianban	Palace Law	91	720
พระไอยการตำแหน่งนาพลเรือน	Phra aiyakan tamnaeng phonlaruean	Civil list	22	1298
พระไอยการอาญาหลวง	Phra aiyakan aya luang	Law of Crimes against Government	114	
อาญาหลวง	aya luang	crimes against government	105	1895
อาญาราษ	aya rat	crimes against people	9	1902
พระไอยการเบดเสรจ	Phra aiyakan betset	Miscellaneous Laws	90	
ทีบ้านที่สวน	thi ban thi suan	house and paddy field	20	1263
เสนียดแก่กัน	saniat kae kan	invective and cursing	18	1903
เช่า ยืม ซื้อ ขาย	chao yuem sue khai	rentals, lending, purchase	27	1565
พนันขันต่อกัน	phanan khanto kan	gambling	4	-
วิวาทด้วยความสาเหดุ	wiwat duai khwam sahet	just cause	9	1906
เวทวิทธยาคมแลกฤษติยาคุณ	wetwithayakhom lae krittiyakhun	magic and spirits	13	1146
กฎ ๓๖ ข้อ	Kot 36 kho	Thirty-six Laws	29	1012-1118
พระราชกำหนดใหม่	Phraratcha kamnot mai	New Royal Decrees	179	1144-1167
พระราชกำหนดเก่า	Phraratcha kamnot kao	Old Royal Decrees	254	1069-1117
พระไอยการพรมศักดิ	Phra aiyakan phrommasak	Law on Punishment	37	
พิกัดกระเสียรอายุศม	phikat krasian ayut	valuation by age	12	955
พระไอยการพรมศักดิ	phra aiyakan phrommasak	law on punishment	25	-

== Publication ==
In 1849, Mot Amatyakun and the American missionary Dan Beach Bradley printed an edition of the Three Seals Law. King Rama III objected and had the books destroyed. One copy of the first volume survived (now in the National Library of Thailand), and the planned second volume may never have been printed.

In 1862–3, Dan Beach Bradley, with the permission of King Rama IV (Mongkut), printed the edition planned in 1849 in two volumes under the title Nangsue rueang kotmai mueang thai (Book on laws of Siam). The edition was printed ten times and widely used.

In 1938-9, a modern edition was prepared by the French legal scholar Robert Lingat and published in three volumes by Thammasat University under the title Pramuan kotmai ratchakan thi 1 C.S. 1166 phim tam chabap luang tra sam duang (Law code of King Rama I, 1805, printed following the Three Seals edition). All modern editions stem from this work.

In 1962-3, Ongkankha Khong Khurusapha (government printers for textbooks, etc.) published a 5-volume edition, based on the Thammasat University edition with corrections, entitled Kotmai tra sam duang (Three Seals Code). A third edition appeared in 1994.

To mark the 200th anniversary of the compilation of the Three Seals Law, the Royal Institute (now the Royal Society of Thailand) published a two-volume edition in 2007 with facsimiles of the manuscripts and transcription, entitled Kotmai tra sam duang: chabap ratchabandittayasathan (Three Seals Code, Royal Institute edition).

== Scholarship ==
Robert Lingat, editor of the 1938-9 edition of the Three Seals Law, published several articles and books on the historical antecedents of the law, and on the law on slavery.

In 1957, MR Seni Pramoj, a lawyer and former prime minister, gave a lecture in Thai summarizing the Three Seals Law, subsequently published as a book.

In 1986, Yoneo Ishii published an English-language summary and analysis of the Three Seals Law. Ishii also headed a project at Kyoto University to produce a computer concordance of the complete text. Access to this database is available through the Center of Integrated Study at Kyoto University, and through the Ayutthaya Digital Archive Project of the Chulachomklao Royal Military Academy (see External Links below).

Michael Vickery published two articles querying the accuracy of the dates appearing in the prefaces off the Three Seals Law texts.

Tamara Loos traced the replacement of the Three Seals Law by modern laws in a Cornell University doctoral thesis published in 2002.

On the occasion of the 200th anniversary of the Three Seals Law in 2005, several researches were published by Thai scholars including Winai Pongsripian, Krisda Boonyasmit, Woraphon Phuphongphan, Pimpan Paiboonwangcharoen, Jakkrit Uttho, and Channarong Bunnun.
