= Yommarat =

Thai noble title

- Seal of Yama on a lion
- Creation date: 1760s
- Created by: Taksin
- Peerage: Thai nobility
- First holder: Chaophraya Aphaiphubet
- Last holder: Chaophraya Yommarat
- Status: Extinct
- Extinction date: 30 December 1938

Yommarat (Thai: ยมราช) is a Thai noble title historically given to the minister of the Krom Mueang or Nakhonban, one of the four ministries under the chatusadom system, which was responsible for maintaining peace and order in the capital. Holders of the title were typically granted the high rank of phraya or chaophraya. The title "Yommarat" is derived from "Yamaraja," the name of the Hindu god of death, Yama, who is believed to govern the underworld. The term "Yommarat" is thus a reflection of the minister's role in overseeing law and order, often in a manner that could involve matters of life and death, similar to the figure of Yamaraja in traditional beliefs.

== List of titleholders ==
Known historical holders of the title include:

During the Ayutthaya period:

- Phraya Yommarat ?–1758 Joined Prince Thepphiphit in a failed rebellion against King Ekkathat in 1758, imprisoned, pardoned and released to fight the invading Burmese in 1760 and died from injury from the battle.
- Phraya Yommarat 1760–1767 Led Siamese armies out to defend Ayutthaya from the invading Burmese in 1760 and 1765, taken as captive to Burma at the Fall of Ayutthaya in 1767.

During the Thonburi period:

1. Phraya Yommarat 1767–1770, first Yommarat of Thonburi period
2. Phraya Yommarat (Bunma) 1770–1771, later became Prince Sura Singhanat
3. Phraya Yommarat (Thongduang) 1771–1774, later became King Rama I, founder of the Chakri dynasty
4. Phraya Yommarat (Mat or Muhammad) 1775–1779, son of Chaophraya Chakri Mud, known as "Phraya Yommarat Khaek" or the "Muslim Yommarat" for his Muslim Persian-Malay ancestry, executed by the order of King Taksin in 1779.
5. Phraya Yommarat 1779–1782

During the Rattanakosin period:

1. Phraya Yommarat (In) 1782–1786 Named by King Rama I when he assumed the throne and founded the Chakri Dynasty in 1782. Stripped of the title as punishment for mistakes made in the Burmese–Siamese War (1785–1786).
2. Phraya Yommarat (Bunnag) 1786–1793 Named following the war; progenitor of Bunnag family, later became Chaophraya Mahasena, the samuhakalahom.
3. Phraya Yommarat (Bunma) 1793–1809 Half-brother of the preceding Yommarat, later became Chaophraya Mahasena.
4. Chaophraya Yommarat (Noi Punyaratabandhu) 1809–1813 Served King Rama II; later became Chaophraya Aphaiphuthon, the samuhanayok.
5. Chaophraya Yommarat (Noi Sisuriyaphaha) 1813–1827 Later became Chaophraya Mahasena under King Rama III.
6. Chaophraya Yommarat (Phun) 1827–? Served King Rama III.
7. Chaophraya Yommarat (Chim) ?–? Served King Rama III.
8. Chaophraya Yommarat (Bunnak) c.1838–1846 Served King Rama III; progenitor of the Yamanaga family. (Vacant: 1846-1851)
9. Chaophraya Yommarat (Suk) 1851–1852 A grandson of Prince Inthraphithak (son of King Taksin); named to the post in 1851, died 1852.
10. Chaophraya Yommarat (Nut Punyaratabandhu) 1853–1863 Son of Chaophraya Aphaiphuthon, later became Chaophraya Phutharaphai, the samuhanayok, in 1863.
11. Chaophraya Yommarat (Khrut) 1864–1865 Born 1808, held the title from 1864 until his death the next year.
12. Chaophraya Yommarat (Kaeo) 1865–1871 Son of Chaophraya Bodindecha; born 1804, died 1871.
13. Chaophraya Yommarat (Choei) 1871–1881 progenitor of the Yamabhaya family.

Following the death of Chaophraya Yommarat (Choei), the title was left vacant, as the government was undergoing structural reforms abolishing the chatusadom system. A committee of four officials was established to oversee its functions in the interim period, before a modern ministry was re-established, named Krasuang Nakhonban or the Ministry of Metropolitan Affairs, in 1892. Prince Nares Varariddhi was named the first minister. In 1907, he was succeeded by Phraya Sukhumnaiwinit, who was named Chaophraya Yommarat (Pan Sukhum) the following year. He was the last holder of the title; the ministry was subsumed into the Ministry of Interior in 1922.
