= Chaophraya Yommarat (Pan Sukhum) =

Thai government official (1862–1938)

Chao Phraya Yommarat Pan Sukhum NR RV PCh MPCh MVM
- เจ้าพระยายมราช (ปั้น สุขุม)
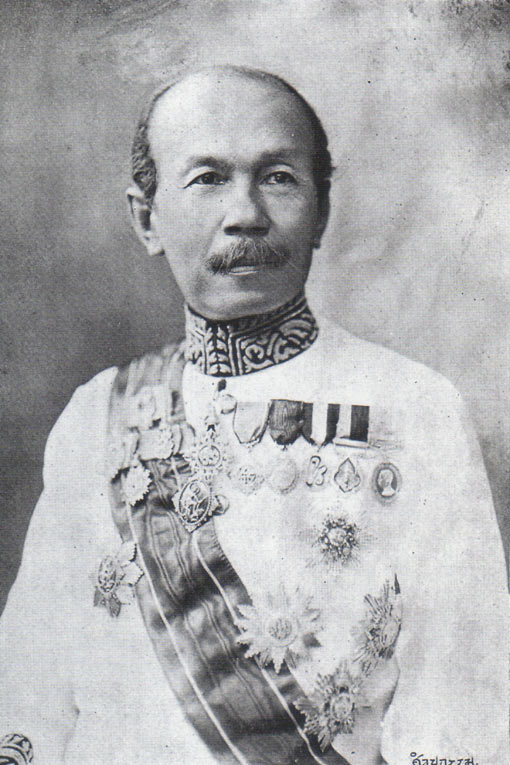
- Pan Sukhum, circa 1920

Regent of Siam
- In office 2 March 1935 – 30 December 1938
- Monarch: Ananda Mahidol (Rama VIII)

Minister of Communications
- In office 1 August 1922 – 11 March 1926
- Monarch: Chulalongkorn (Rama V)
- Preceded by: Phraya Suriyanuwat (Kerd Bunnag)
- Succeeded by: Nares Varariddhi

Minister of Metropolitan Affairs
- In office 5 December 1907 – 1 August 1922
- Monarch: Chulalongkorn (Rama V)
- Preceded by: Nares Varariddhi
- Succeeded by: Ministry disbanded

Personal details
- Born: 15 July 1862 Suphan Buri Province Siam
- Died: 30 December 1938 (aged 76) Bangkok, Siam
- Spouse: Thanpuying Talab Yommarat

Military service
- Rank: Colonel; Group Captain

Pan Sukhum (Thai: ปั้น สุขุม), better known by the noble title Chaophraya Yommarat (เจ้าพระยายมราช, 1862 – 30 December 1938) was regent to the King Rama VIII of Thailand and a civil servant who helped lead Thailand's development into the modern era. He served in several high-ranking roles, including as the Minister of Interior, under the governments of kings Chulalongkorn (Rama V) and Vajiravudh (Rama VI).

== Life ==
Pan was born in Suphan Buri and raised as a novice Buddhist monk in Bangkok. He left the monkhood to join government service around the age of 21, becoming a teacher at the royal palace school and then a tutor to Chulalongkorn's children studying in England, where he served as a diplomat in London for 11 years. He then became commissioner of Monthon Nakhon Si Thammarat under the new monthon administration system for 12 years, and was later appointed to several successive ministerships in the reformed government system: those of Public Works, Metropolitan Affairs, and Interior. He oversaw various modernizing public works projects, including the introduction of electricity and waterworks in the capital and the establishment of a modern police force, and also established the country's first cement factory (now Siam Cement Group). He was elevated to the highest noble rank of chaophraya, receiving the title Yommarat, in 1908. He retired from public office in 1926, but was later appointed regent to the young King Ananda Mahidol (Rama VIII) in 1935, holding the position until his death in 1938.

Chao Phraya Yommarat Hospital, the main hospital of Suphan Buri Province, is named after him.

== Descendants ==
Chaophraya Yommarat had four wives: Thanphuying Talap Yommarat (née Na Pomphet), To (née Na Pomphet) who is Talap's sister, Nom and Puk. He had the following children:

1. Phraya Sukhumnaya Vinit (Savad Sukhum) married Phan Sukhum (née Na Patthalung), Khunying Thanim Sukhum (née Navanukroh) and Khunying Puang
  1. Phao Sukhum
  2. Phayom Kalyanamitra
  3. Nang Chattrakarkosol (Sukhon Limpichat) married Luang Chattrakarkosol (Chiam Limpichat), the progenitor of Limpichat family
    1. Trakar Lekhyananda
    2. Police Lieutenant General Kosol Limpichat
    3. Sukhontha Na Songkhla
  4. Narong Sukhum
  5. La-iad Navanukroh
2. Sawai Sukhum (died in childhood)
3. Plaek Sukhum (died in childhood)
4. Mom Prayur Sonakul na Ayudhya (Sukhum) married Prince Dhani Nivat, the Prince Bidyalabh Bridhyakara
  1. Mom Rajawongse Nivatvar Na Pomphet
  2. Mom Rajawongse Panaditya Sonakul
  3. Mom Rajawongse Supitcha Sonakul
5. Luang Bisitha Sukhumkara (Praphas Sukhum) married Mali Sukhum (née Kitikoses) and Prayong
  1. Flight Lieutenant Dr. Kittipravati Sukhum
  2. Air Marshal Bisith Sukhum
  3. Subhanga Chotiksathiar
  4. Rachit Chandrangsu
  5. Subhavar Sukhum
  6. Trakol Sukhum
  7. Choedchom Sukhum
6. Phra Bishal Sukhumvid (Prasob Sukhum) married Pha-ob Sukhum (née Chanchueamat)
  1. Prasong Sukhum
  2. Dr. Praserth Sukhum
  3. Prasansri Sukhum
7. Prayong Sukhum
8. Prasat Sukhum married Princess Barnkham of Chiang Mai, great-granddaughter of King Inthawichayanon
  1. Prasit Sukhum
9. Luang Sukhumnaya Pradistha (Pradit Sukhum) married Rattana Sukhum (née Yanavari), Phoemsiri Sukhum (née Amatayakul) and others
  1. Sumon Karnasuta
  2. Prachong Sarakitpreecha
  3. Pradoem Sukhum
  4. Praphan Rattanakanok
  5. Samnao Sukhum
  6. Sini Chuangsuvanich
  7. Pradittha Patthanapaet
  8. Dr. Pradab Sukhum
  9. Pranee Garnier
  10. Parichat Sukhum
  11. Naruphorn Grace
  12. Kittima Sangkasem
10. Pravat Sukhum married Chamnan Sukhum (née Osathananda)
  1. Dibyaraksa Sukhum
11. Lek Sukhum (died in childhood)
12. Pranom Na Nagara (Sukhum) married Deputy Chief Yib Na Nagara
  1. Badhanabongse Na Nagara
  2. Yutthasar Na Nagara
  3. Karnika Indrasuta
  4. Lieutenant Asok Na Nagara
  5. Yodhin Na Nagara
13. Khunying Prachuab Sukhum married Chaophraya Ramrakhop (Mom Luang Fuea Phuengbun), great-great-grandson of Buddha Yodfa Chulalok
  1. Ruchira Amatayakul
  2. Manon Phuengbun na Ayudhya
14. Police Major General Nit Sukhum married Mom Luang Kamala Sudasna, great-great-granddaughter of Buddha Yodfa Chulalok
  1. Vanida Dulalamba
  2. Kanchana Sukhum
15. Pong Nitiphon (Sukhum) married firstly with Prince Ruchayakara Abhakara, son of Abhakara Kiartivongse. married secondly with Sawat Nitiphon
  1. Mom Rajawongse Rujaya Abhakara
  2. Mom Rajawongse Chiyakara Sesavej
  3. Suphon Nitiphon
  4. Supot Nitiphon
16. Pranit na Nakhorn (Sukhum) married Larb na Nakhorn
  1. Chailert na Nakhorn
  2. Jon Na Nagara (na Nakhorn)
  3. Jenchurai Brown (na Nakhorn)
