= Khanom chak =

Thai dessert

Khanom chak (Thai: ขนมจาก, pronounced [kʰa. nǒm tɕàːk]) is a Traditional Thai dessert from Thailand made with a sweet coconut and rice batter wrapped in nipa palm leaves and grilled over hot charcoal. It is chewy, sweet, and smoky. These flavors are part of the food culture in Thailand’s coastal communities.The dessert is associated with several Thai communities, including those in coastal areas, where nipa palm leaves are used in its preparation.

== Name and Origin ==
The name is derives from two Thai words: “khanom” (Thai: ขนม), meaning "dessert", while “chak,” refers to Nipa plam leaf (Nypa fruticans) (Thai: ใบจาก)

The dessert is named after the nipa palm leaves traditionally used to “wrap the dessert before grilling.

Khanom Chak ขนมจาก

The nipa palm Tree grows naturally in brackish-water environments. It is particularly associated with the southern , eastern and central coastal, including areas around Songkla , Phatthalung , Chon Buri, Chachoengsao, and Samut Prakan.The dessert developed from the relationship between local people and their surrounding environment. Nipa palm leaves were readily available and were traditionally used as natural wrapping materials

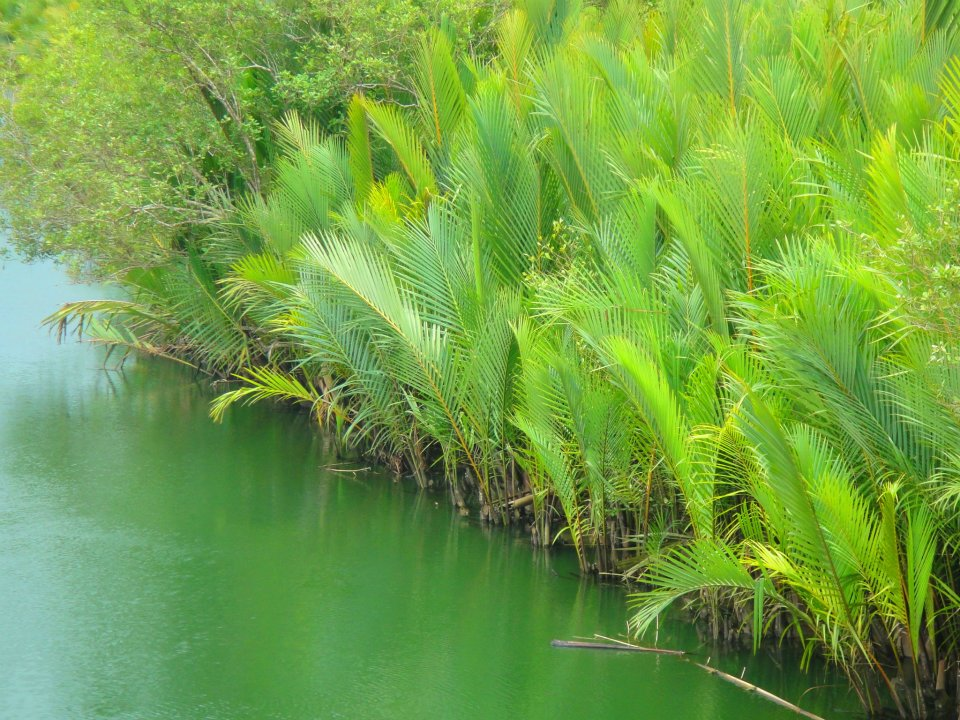
์Nipa palm ใบจาก

== Habitat and Growing Conditions ==
Nipa palm (Nypa fruticans) typically grows in tropical coastal and estuarine environments, particularly along riverbanks, tidal creeks, and river mouths where freshwater mixes with seawater. It is adapted to brackish water and mud that are affected by tidal movements. These conditions support the growth of nipa palm in mangrove ecosystems.

== History ==
Khanom chak can be found in many areas in Thailand close to the coastal area because all of the ingredients are found in these areas. The name of comes from the nipa palm which in Thailand is called chak (Thai: จาก). Nipa palm leaves are used to cover because they make a frangent. It is folk wisdom over many centuries.

Khanom chak is used in the sacred ceremony at Phra Samut Chedi, a pagoda in Amphoe Phra Samut Chedi, Samut Prakan.

Khanom chak is a traditional Thai dessert associated with coastal communities. In Phra Samut Chedi District, Samut Prakan Province, it is made using ingredients such as glutinous rice flour, grated coconut, and sugar. The mixture is wrapped in nipa palm (*Nypa fruticans*) leaves and grilled over charcoal. Although the dessert is associated with several local food traditions, its exact date and place of origin have not been established by the available sources.

In Samut Prakan, Khanom chak is also sold as a local food product and souvenir. The Lim Damrong shop in Pak Nam has been described by the Samut Prakan Provincial Farmers Council as a business with a history of more than a century.

Khanom chak production has also been documented in Ban Bang Dee, Mae Chao Yu Hua Subdistrict, Chian Yai District, Nakhon Si Thammarat Province. A study published in 2020 examined local production knowledge and the challenges faced by people involved in making the dessert. The study identified problems including inconsistent ingredient proportions, limited availability and rising costs of raw materials, difficulties in maintaining product quality after cooling, and a shortage of people continuing the occupation.

In 2023, Khanom chak was featured in Thailand's *One Province, One Local Dish* initiative for Samut Prakan. The report described local preparation methods and variations incorporating ingredients such as taro and nipa palm fruit. These examples document regional variations in the preparation of Khanom chak. However, the available sources do not establish a definitive date or a single place of origin for the dessert.

== Consumption and Cultural Practices ==
Khanom chak is sold as a local food product in parts of Thailand. In Chachoengsao Province, vendors near Wat Sothon Wararam Worawihan have sold the dessert for many years, and some vendors rely on its production and sale for income.

In Samut Prakan Province, Khanom chak is associated with Phra Samut Chedi District. Local accounts describe the dessert as a traditional food that was prepared for household consumption and exchanged among community members. Community-based production has also been documented in other areas, where making Khanom chak provides income for local producers and supports the continuation of traditional food-making knowledge.

It also attracts visitors who want to experience local Thai food and learn more about traditional cooking methods.

== Ingredients ==
- 1/2 kilogram of white or black glutinous rice flour
- 1/4 kilogram of rice flour
- 1/3 kilogram of palm sugar
- 1/2 kilogram of granulated sugar
- Grate two coconuts using a grater
- 1/2 – 1 teaspoon of salt

== Traditional making process ==
1. Mix the glutinous rice flour with the grated coconut and knead until well combined.
2. Add the palm sugar, granulated sugar, and salt. Knead well, monitoring the consistency. If it's too thick, add plain water or young coconut water until it reaches a moderate consistency—not too thick and not too runny.
3. Spoon the mixture into the prepared palm leaves, lining the inside lengthwise. Cover with another leaf, securing it with wooden skewers at the top, bottom, and middle. Fold the ends together and secure with another skewer.
4. Grill the dessert over low to medium heat (avoid high heat as it will burn the palm leaves). Grill until cooked, noting the dessert's firmness and fragrant aroma.

== Regional Distribution and Local Characteristics ==
Khanom chak is a traditional Thai dessert made from glutinous rice flour, grated coconut, and sugar. The mixture is wrapped in nipa palm (Nypa fruticans) leaves and roasted, giving the dessert its characteristic aroma. Khanom chak is prepared in several parts of Thailand.

Chachoengsao Province, Eastern Thailand — Local communities traditionally use nipa palm (Nypa fruticans) leaves to wrap Khanom Chak. Research has documented this practice as part of local knowledge concerning nipa palm utilization.

Chon Buri Province, Eastern Thailand — Khanom Chak is documented as a traditional snack of the Nong Mon community. Its preparation uses glutinous rice flour, coconut sugar, grated coconut, and nipa palm leaves

Phetchaburi Province, Western Thailand — Local wisdom records document Khanom Chak preparation in Bang Khrok Subdistrict, Ban Laem District. The recorded practice uses locally available nipa palm leaves to wrap the dessert.

These examples document Khanom Chak preparation and traditional practices in specific Thai communities. They do not establish the dessert's place of origin or represent all areas where it is produced.

== Cultural Significance ==
Khanom Chak represents the connection between people and place. Using nipa palm leaves, local ingredients, traditional cooking techniques, and intergenerational knowledge, the dessert preserves both the natural identity and cultural heritage of local Thai communities.

== Similar desserts ==
=== Malaysia ===
Pulut Panggang (Malay: pulut panggang, lit. ‘grilled glutinous rice’) is a traditional Malaysian Malay kuih made primarily from glutinous rice, coconut milk, and salt. The rice is typically filled with a savory mixture of grated coconut, dried shrimp, chilies, and spices, then wrapped in banana leaves and grilled over charcoal. The grilling process gives the dish a distinctive smoky aroma, while the glutinous rice develops a soft, chewy texture and the filling provides a savory flavor.

Pulut Panggang

Pulut panggang is commonly enjoyed as a traditional snack, particularly during breakfast or afternoon tea. Its preparation reflects traditional cooking practices through the use of locally available ingredients, aromatic banana leaves, and charcoal grilling. Regional variations exist, with fillings that may include spiced coconut, dried shrimp, fish, or meat. In Penang, a similar preparation is known as rempah udang, The diversity of traditional kuih across Malaysia and the wider Southeast Asian region.

=== Indonesia ===
Kue Pancong / Kue Rangin (Indonesian: kue pancong, literally ‘coconut rice-flour cake’) is a traditional Indonesian coconut cake commonly associated with Betawi cuisine in Jakarta and also enjoyed in other regions under different names, including bandros in West Java and rangin in parts of East Java. It is typically made from rice flour, freshly grated coconut, coconut milk, and salt. The batter is cooked in a specially shaped metal mold until the exterior becomes lightly crisp while the inside remains soft, moist, and slightly chewy. It is often served warm with a sprinkling of granulated sugar, although contemporary versions may feature additional toppings such as chocolate or cheese.

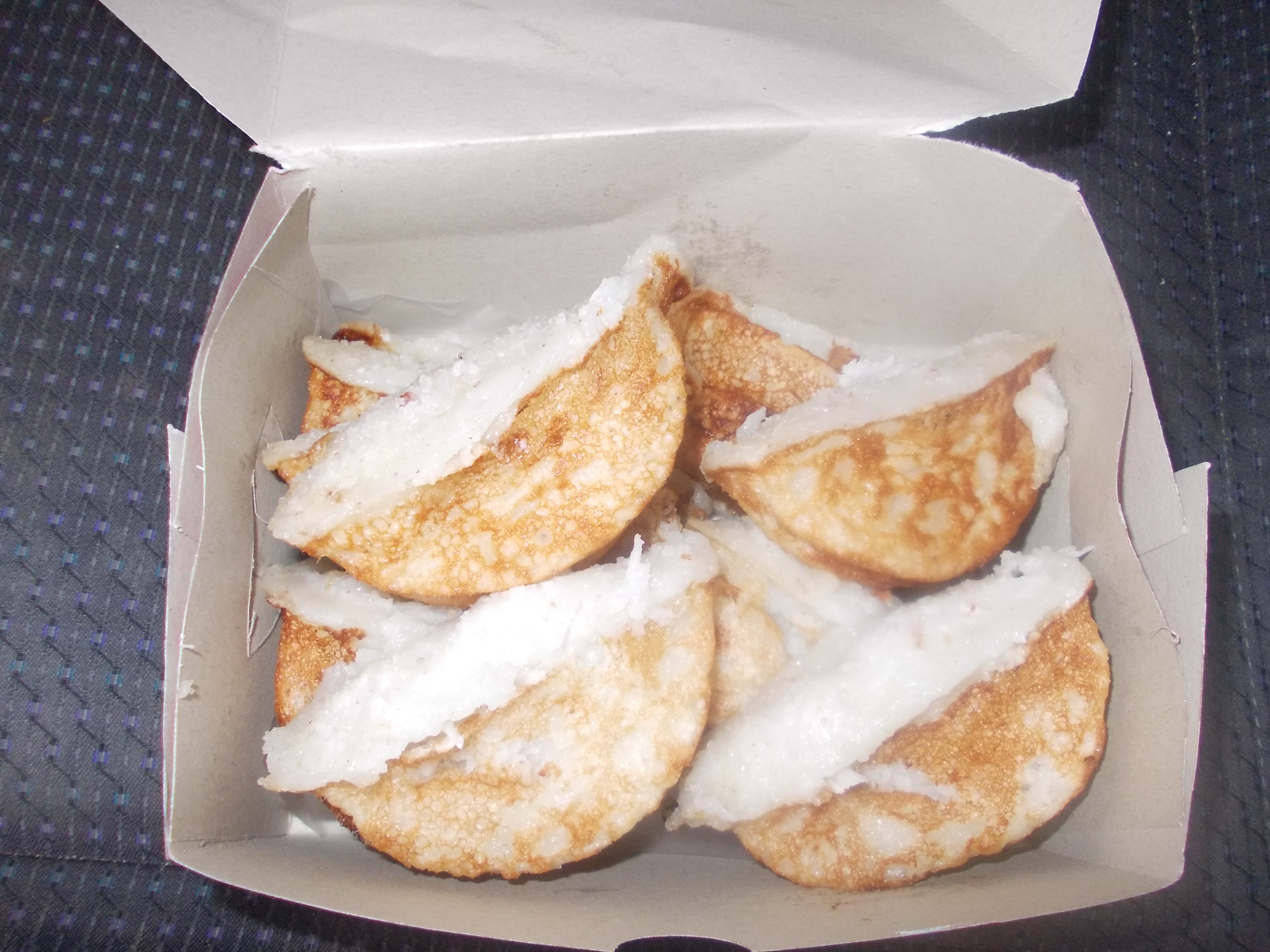
Kue pancung

Beyond its simple ingredients, Kue Pancong / Kue Rangin reflects Indonesia’s long-standing street-food culture and the use of coconut in traditional local cuisine. Commonly sold at traditional markets and by street vendors, this snack remains familiar across generations. Its regional names and slight variations in preparation also shared culinary tradition can develop distinct local identities while retaining its characteristic coconut flavor.

=== Malaysia ===
Lepat Pisang (Malay: lepat pisang, literally ‘banana parcel’) is a traditional Malaysian kuih made primarily from ripe bananas, rice flour, grated coconut, and sugar. The ingredients are mixed into a thick batter, wrapped in banana leaves, and steamed until the mixture becomes soft, moist, and slightly chewy. The banana leaves impart a subtle aroma, while the ripe bananas provide natural sweetness and a distinctive fruity flavor. Some variations include grated coconut or other locally available ingredients to enhance the taste and texture.

Lepat_pisang

Lepat Pisang is commonly enjoyed as a traditional snack during breakfast or afternoon tea and is also found at local markets and roadside food stalls. Its preparation reflects the use of abundant tropical ingredients and traditional steaming techniques in Malay cuisine. Wrapping the mixture in banana leaves not only helps shape the kuih but also adds fragrance and connects the dish to the wider tradition of leaf-wrapped foods throughout Southeast Asia.

=== Philippines ===
Bibingka (Filipino: bibingka, a traditional rice cake) is a well-known Filipino delicacy traditionally made from rice flour, coconut milk, sugar, and eggs. The batter is poured into a round container lined with banana leaves and baked, traditionally using heat from both above and below in a clay oven. This cooking method gives the cake a lightly toasted surface, a soft and fluffy interior, and a subtle fragrance from the banana leaves. Depending on the regional recipe, bibingka may be topped with salted egg, grated coconut, cheese, or butter to create a balance of sweet and savory flavors.

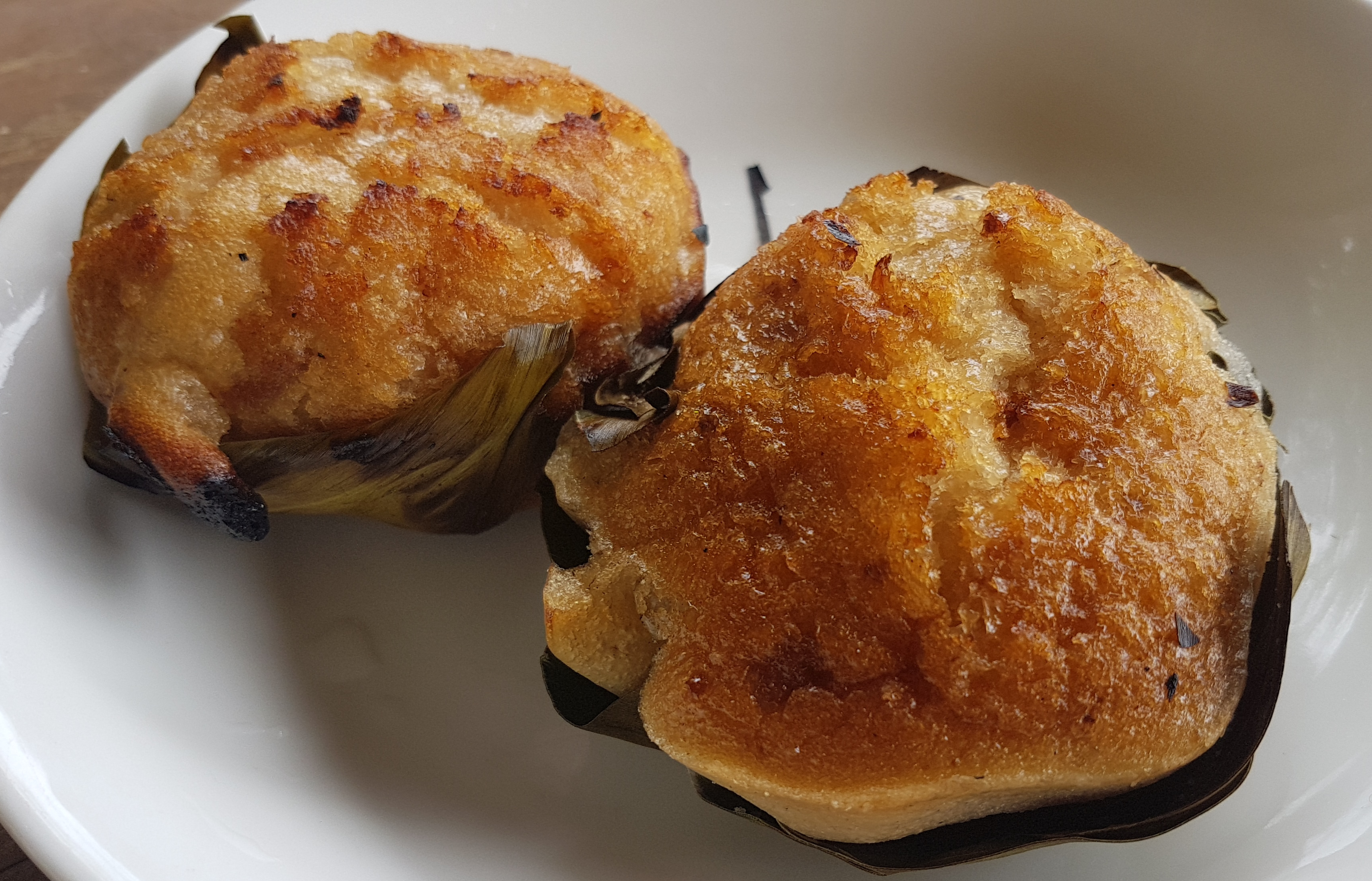
Bibingka

Bibingka is strongly associated with Filipino Christmas traditions and is commonly sold outside churches during the Simbang Gabi, a series of early morning masses held before Christmas. It is often enjoyed warm alongside puto bumbong, another traditional rice-based delicacy. Beyond its festive significance, bibingka reflects the Philippines’ culinary heritage through the use of rice, coconut, and banana leaves, demonstrating how traditional ingredients and cooking methods continue to shape local food culture.

=== India ===
Ela Ada (Malayalam: *ഇല അട*, literally ‘leaf parcel’) is a traditional steamed delicacy originating from Kerala, in southern India. It is typically prepared using rice flour dough filled with a sweet mixture of grated coconut and jaggery, a traditional unrefined sugar made from palm sap or sugarcane. The filling is placed inside a thin layer of rice dough, folded in a fresh banana leaf, and steamed until cooked. This process gives the rice layer a soft, delicate texture, while the coconut and jaggery filling provides a naturally sweet flavor. The banana leaf also lends a subtle fragrance to the finished dish

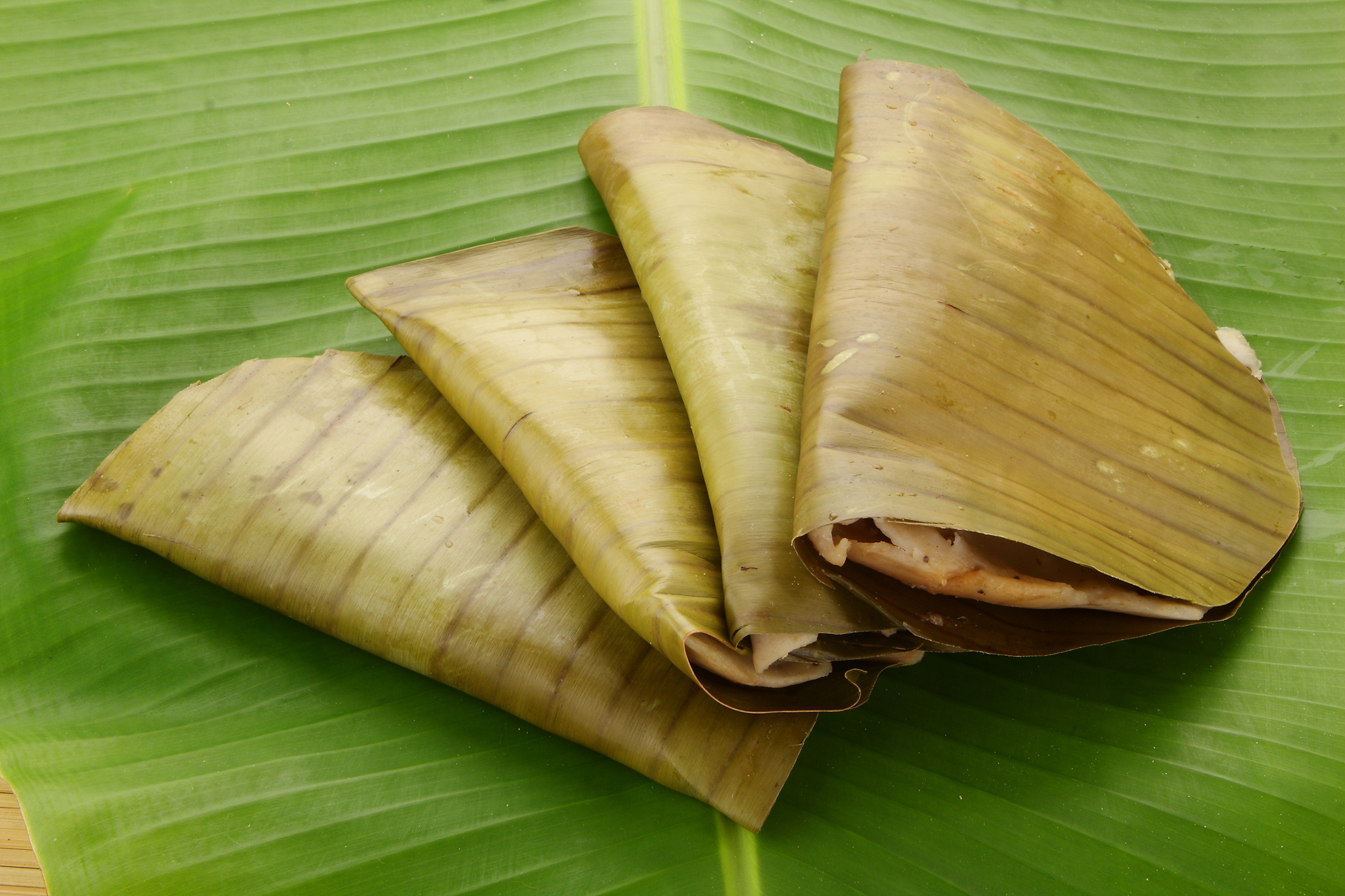
Ela Ada

Ela Ada is closely associated with Kerala’s home-cooking traditions and is commonly enjoyed as a breakfast dish or evening snack, as well as during Onam festivals and family gatherings. Its preparation highlights the use of locally available ingredients, particularly rice, coconut, jaggery, and banana leaves. The practice of steaming food in leaves reflects a broader culinary tradition across South India, combining simple cooking techniques with the distinctive aromas of natural wrapping materials.

== See also ==
- Thai cuisine
- List of Thai desserts
