= Pak Khlong Bang Pla Kot =

Pak Khlong Bang Pla Kot ปากคลองบางปลากด
- Tambon
- Phra Samut Chedi Subdistrict Municipality
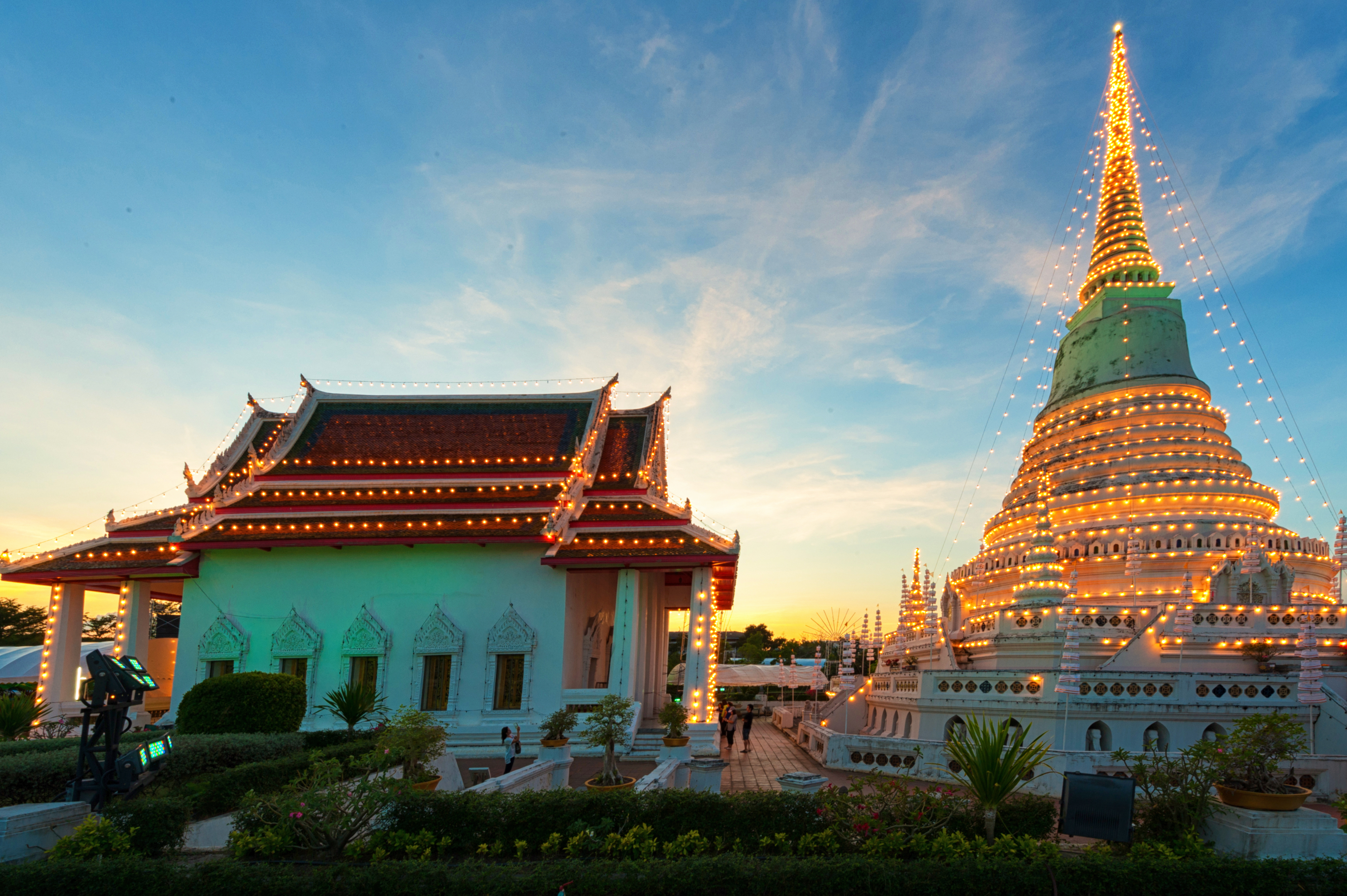
- Wat Phra Samut Chedi
- Etymology: "the mouth of the bagrid catfish canal"
- Location in Bangkok Metropolitan Region
- Coordinates: 13°35′58.27″N 100°35′7.30″E
- Country: Thailand
- Province: Samut Prakan
- District: Phra Samut Chedi
- Named for: Khlong Bang Pla Kot

Government
  - Type: Subdistrict Municipality
  - Mayor (acting): Rungrat Songpholwarin

Area
  - Total: 6.55 km^{2} (2.53 sq mi)

Population
  - Total: 11,299
  - Density: 1,730/km^{2} (4,470/sq mi)
- Time zone: UTC+7 (ICT)
- Postcode: 10290
- Area code: (+66) 02
- Website: https://phrasamutjedee.go.th/public/

Pak Khlong Bang Pla Kot (Thai: ปากคลองบางปลากด, pronounced [pàːk kʰlɔ̄ːŋ bāːŋ plāː kót]) is a tambon (subdistrict) in Phra Samut Chedi District, Samut Prakan Province, central Thailand.

== History ==
Pak Khlong Bang Pla Kot is a settlement located along a khlong (canal) of the same name that runs through the area. The name literally translates as "the mouth of the bagrid catfish canal". Khlong Bang Pla Kot is a waterway on the right bank of the Chao Phraya River, which has long been used as a thoroughfare.

During the middle Ayutthaya period, in the reign of King Ekathotsarot, the area was the site of a Dutch trading post known as "New Amsterdam". This is described in The History of Japan Together with a Description of the Kingdom of Siam, 1690-1692, based on the writings of Engelbert Kaempfer, a German physician who accompanied the Dutch diplomatic mission seeking to establish good relations with Ayutthaya in the early reign of King Phetracha.

According to Kaempfer, the trading post was located about two leagues from the river mouth. It consisted of a large bamboo building whose roof was used to store animal hides awaiting shipment.

The present-day site of New Amsterdam is believed to be Soi Suk Sawat 55, off Highway 303 (Suk Sawat Road), now the location of AGC Chemicals (Thailand) Co., Ltd. No visible remains of the post survive today.

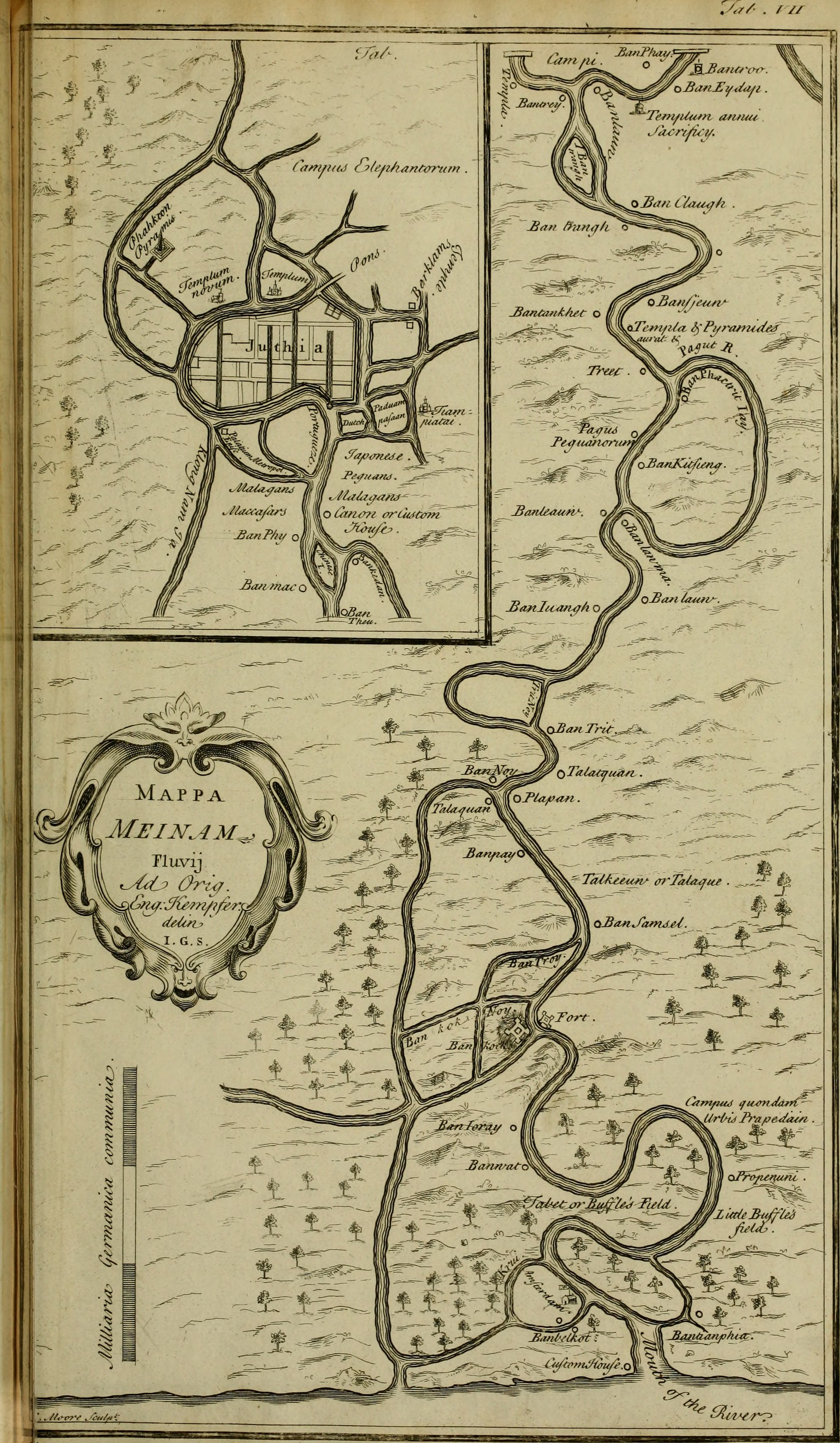
The map by Engelbert Kaempfer (1680)

| 1 | Location of Phra Pradaeng (old) in now Khlong Toei Port |
| 2 | Location of New Amsterdam, Pak Khlong Bang Pla Kot |

== Geography ==
The terrain is a lowland with the Chao Phraya River flowing through, affected by the flooding of the sea. The soil condition is saline soil, not suitable for cultivation.

It has a total area of 6.55 square kilometers, about 2 km (1.2 mi) from the city of Samut Prakan.

Adjacent areas are (from the north clockwise): Lat Luang Town Municipality, Chao Phraya River, Laem Fa Pha Subdistrict Municipality, and Subdistrict Administrative Organization Nai Khlong Bang Pla Kot.

== Administration ==
The entire area of the Pak Khlong Bang Pla Kot is governed by the Phra Samut Chedi Subdistrict Municipality (เทศบาลตำบลพระสมุทรเจดีย์).

It was also divided into four muban (village)

| No. | Name | Thai |
|---|---|---|
| 1. | Ban Khlong Song Phi Nong | บ้านคลองสองพี่น้อง |
| 2. | Ban Wat Khae | บ้านวัดแค |
| 3. | Ban Chedi | บ้านเจดีย์ |
| 4. | Ban Khlong Wat Bot | บ้านคลองวัดโบสถ์ |

These four villages could also be divided into 15 communities.

== Population ==
Pak Khlong Bang Pla Kot has a total population of 11,299 (5,552 men, 5,747 women) in 5,708 households.

== Place ==
=== Temples ===
- Wat Phra Samut Chedi
- Wat Khae

=== Historical house ===
- Phisuea Samut Fort

=== Education ===
- Pomnakkarach Sawatyanon School

=== Hospital ===
- Paolo Hospital Phrapradaeng

=== Government office ===
- Phra Samut Chedi Police Station
