= Ban Sakhla =

Community in Samut Prakan province, Thailand

Coordinates: 13.5419016774°N 100.504227289°E

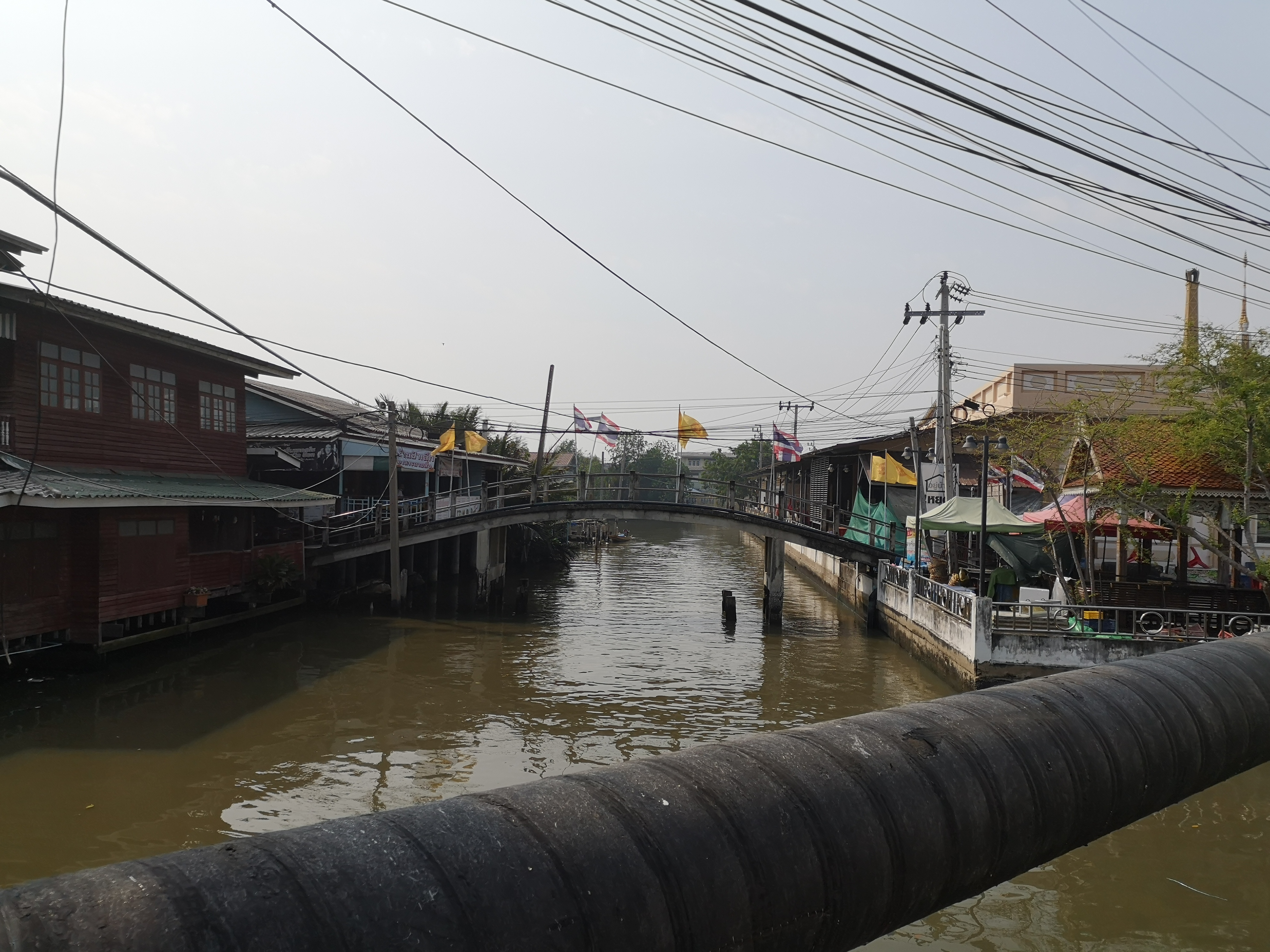
The bridge over the canal

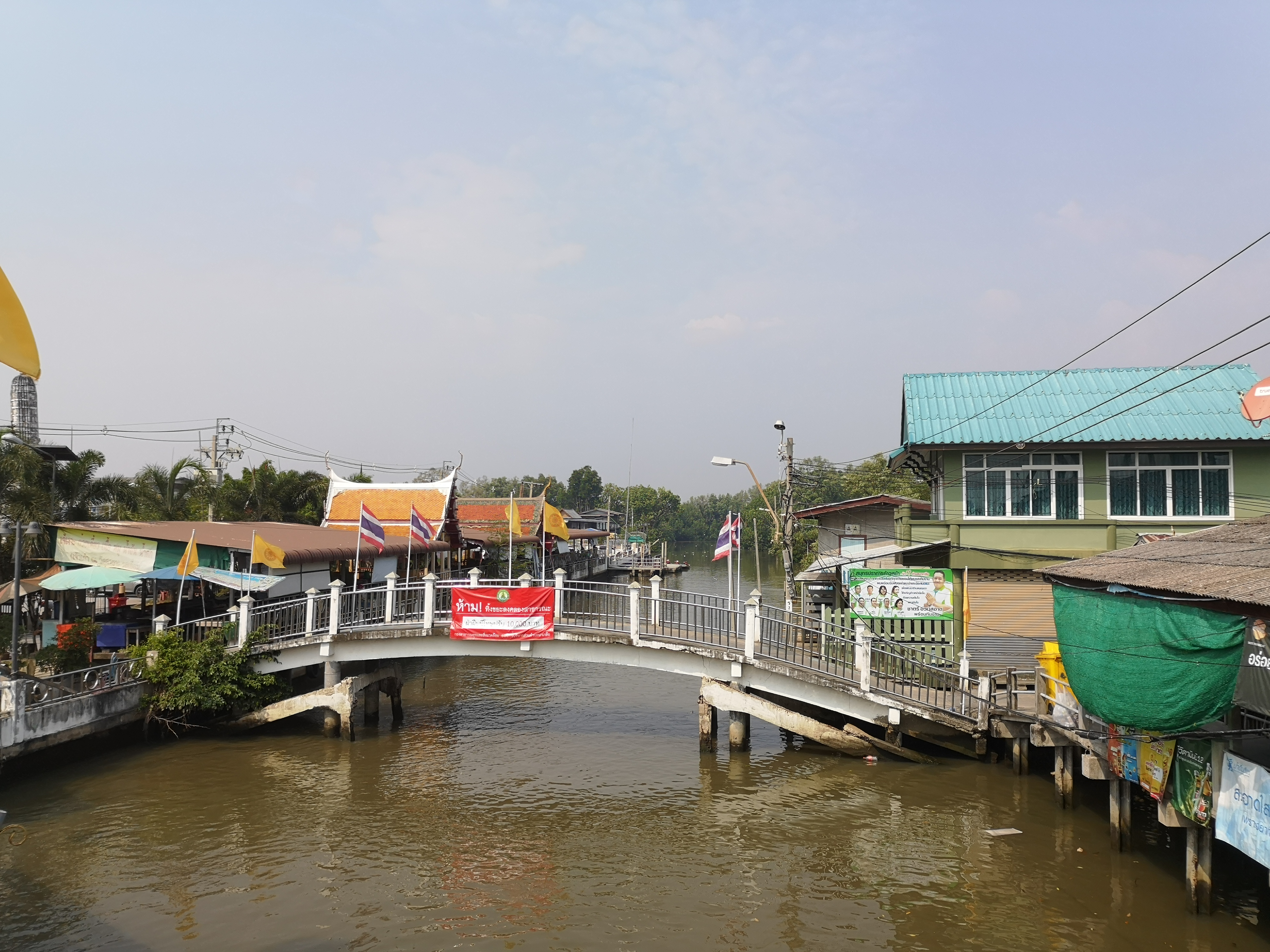
Typically atmosphere of Ban Sakhla

Ban Sakhla (Thai: บ้านสาขลา; [bâːn sǎːkʰlǎː]) is a community and muban (village) consists of Moo 3, Moo4, Moo 5 and Moo 7 of Na Kluea sub-district in Phra Samut Chedi district, Samut Prakan province on the eastern outskirts Bangkok.

Ban Sakhla is a traditional waterfront community lays on the both side of Khlong Sapphasamit canal near the Chao Phraya river estuary, where the river empties into Bay of Bangkok (upper Gulf of Thailand). Its history dates back to the late Sukhothai and early Ayutthaya periods due to the excavation of archaeological evidence such as porcelains and potteries dating back to those eras.

Originally it known as "Ban Sao Kla" because during the Nine Armies War (1785–86) in the King Rama I's reign when all village men were drafted into the military only women left. But they bravely fought against the Burmese invaders to protect their village. Finally, they won the fight, hence the name "Ban Sao Kla" (บ้านสาวกล้า, "village of courage maidens") and later mispronounced to "Ban Sakhla" since then.

It is an isolated community surrounded by fish and shrimp with crab ponds and far from the downtown district. It is not accessible by road, the thoroughfare within the community are narrow paths. The only vehicles that can pass are bicycle or motorbike. Individual houses may be adjacent to each other or separated by waterways. The long-tailed boat is the most important vehicle. The locals as well as the houses still maintain the way of life of the olden days. They have Wat Sakhla temple (built in 1782) as a spiritual anchor. At present, Ban Sakhla is considered another cultural attraction of Samut Prakan, where there are still lesser known and less crowded tourists.

Kuung yiat (กุ้งเหยียด, "stretched shrimp") is a regional dish, it is a sweetened variety of dried shrimp that can be eaten head, legs and all.

The folks of Ban Sakhla use central Thai as their primary language but some words and accents are in Mon language.
