= Na Kluea =

Na Kluea ('salt farm') may refer to the following places in Thailand:

- Na Kluea, Samut Prakan
- Na Kluea, Kantang district, Trang province
- Na Kluea, Bang Lamung district, Chonburi province
