= Khlong Sapphasamit =

Coordinates: 13.555519°N 100.510570°E

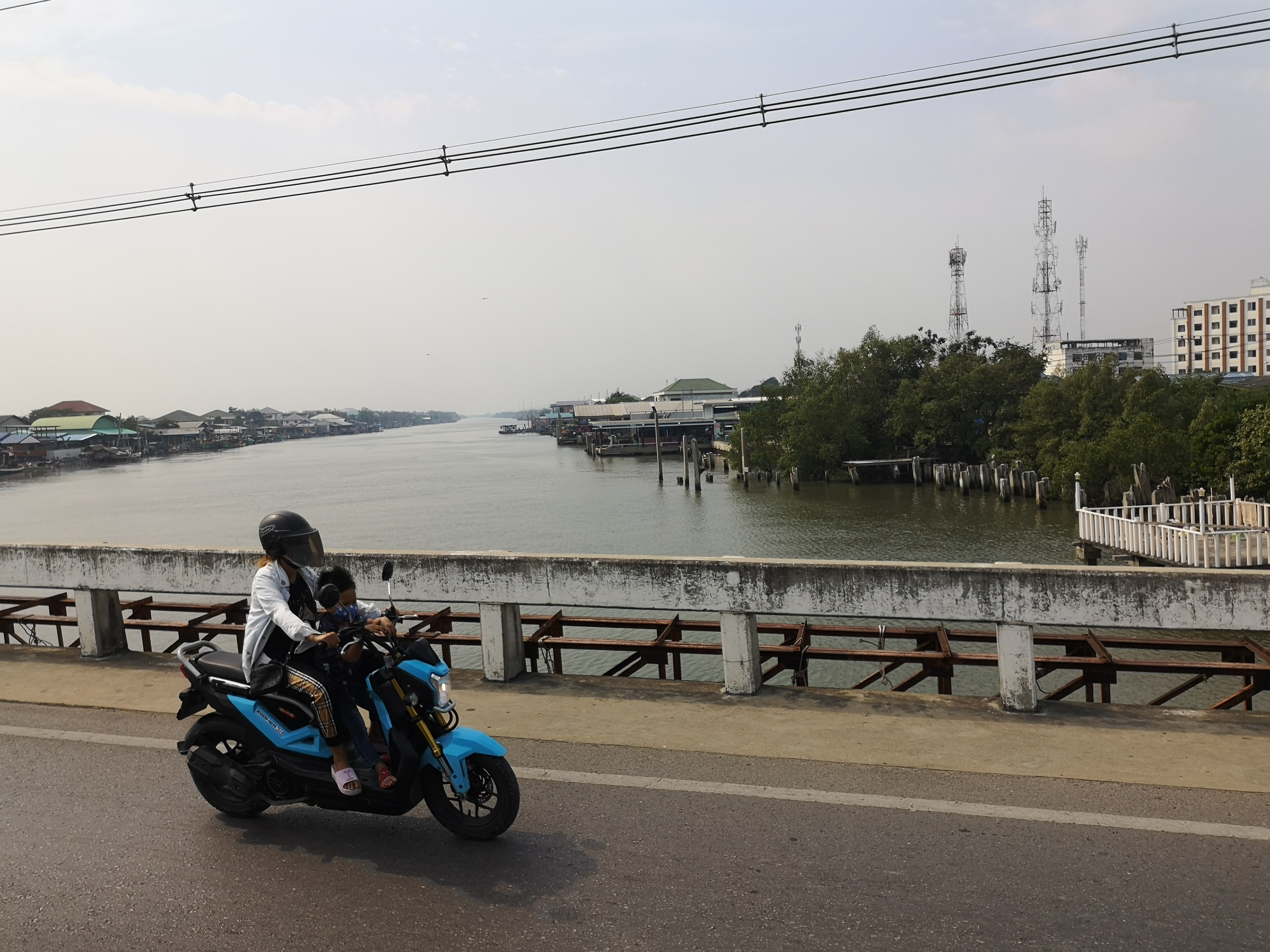
Khlong Sapphasamit in the area of Phra Samut Chedi

Khlong Sapphasamit (Thai: คลองสรรพสามิต, pronounced [kʰlɔːŋ sáp pʰá sāː.mít]) (Note: It can also be pronounced as Khlong Sanphasamit (pronounced [kʰlɔːŋ sǎn pʰá sāː.mít].)) is a man-made waterway and one of the important water resources in Samut Prakan province on outskirts Bangkok.

It was excavated in 1939 by the government of Pridi Banomyong, Minister of Finance in those days (match the King Rama VIII's reign) for salt transport, the main products of the province. Which the Excise Department collects tax according to the Salt Act, 1938. Hence the name "Khlong Sapphasamit", which means "excise canal". When it was completed, Pridi Banomyong presided over the opening ceremony on November 19, 1939.

The canal begins at the Chao Phraya river in Ban Laem Fa Pha to the end of Khlong Bang Pla Kot in the Ban Sakhla area, the length is about 8 km (5.0 mi) and the width is about 16 m (52.5 ft). Later, a canal was dug through to the Tha Chin river in Samut Songkhram province, total distance about 30 km (18.6 mi).

The canal is now wider than ever before, this is the result of seawater erosion of the banks. The water is brackish because it is close to the mouth of the Bay of Bangkok (upper Gulf of Thailand). There are lots of nipa palms in the mangrove forest along both sides of the canal, especially in the Ban Na Kluea area.

Currently, it is in charge of Laem Fa Pha Subdistrict Municipality, Phra Samut Chedi district. Khlong Sapphasamit is an important source of water for small-scale local fishermen including being another cultural tourism route in Samut Prakan.
