= Highway 303 (Thailand) =

National Highway in Thailand

Suksawat Road ถนนสุขสวัสดิ์
- ทางหลวงแผ่นดินหมายเลข 303
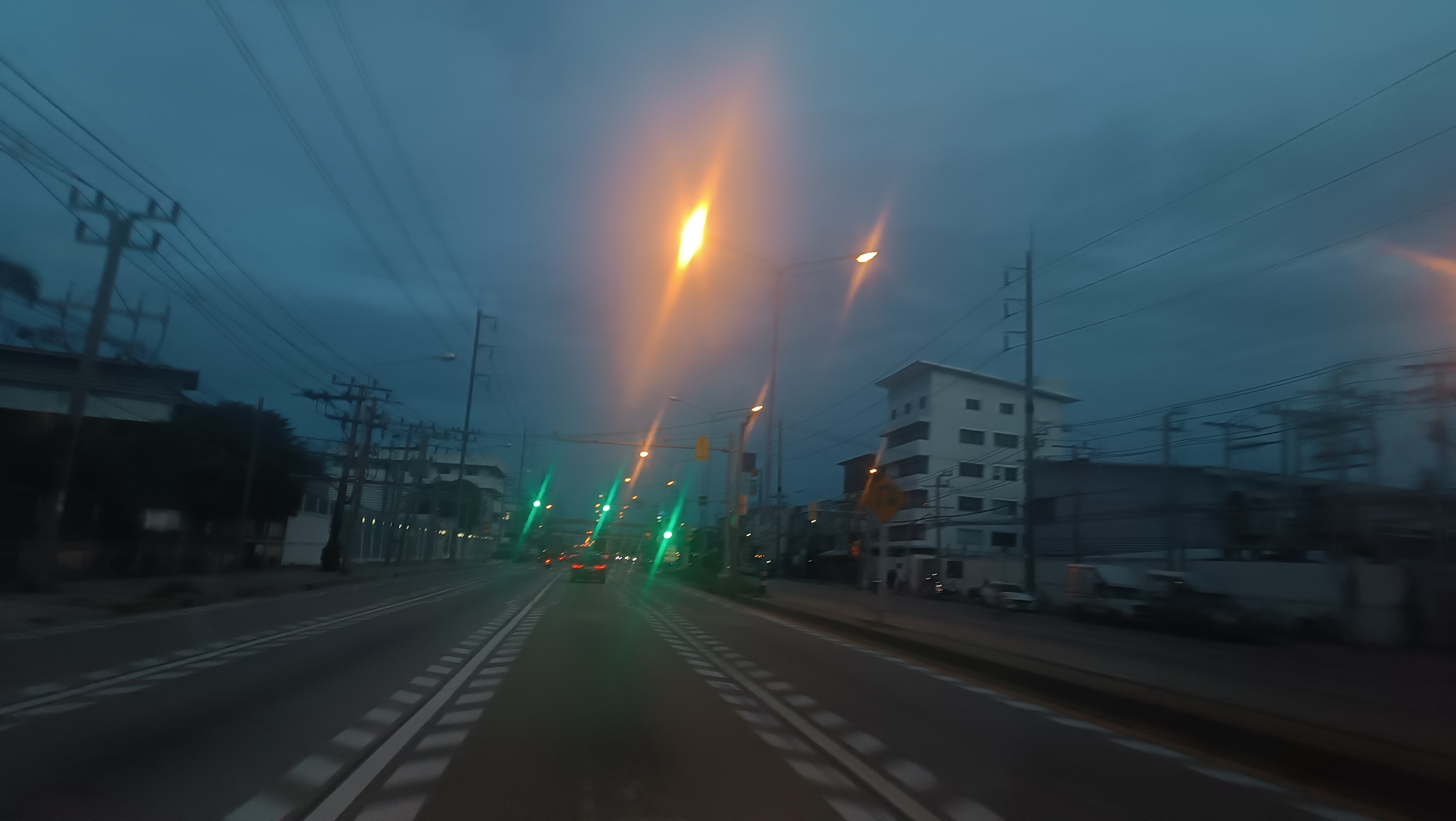

Route information
- Maintained by Department of Highways
- Length: 28 km (17 mi)

Major junctions
- North end: Somdet Phra Chao Taksin Road, Bangkok
- South end: Pom Phrachul Fort, Samut Prakan

Location
- Country: Thailand
- Provinces: Samut Prakan Bangkok

Highway system
- Highways in Thailand; Motorways; Asian Highways

Suksawat Road (Thai:ถนนสุขสวัสดิ์) is a main road of Phra Samut Chedi District stretching 28 kilometres.

The section of Suk Sawat Road from kilometer 0 to kilometer 6+463 is under the responsibility of the Bangkok Metropolitan Administration's Department of Public Works, while the section from kilometer 6+463 to kilometer 21+732 is under the responsibility of the Samut Prakan Highway District.

== History ==
The majority of this road is designated as Highway 303, the Rat Burana–Phra Samut Chedi route (formerly known as "Dao Khanong – Pom Phra Chul Highway"), built during the time of P. Phibulsongkhram. This road was named in honor of Lieutenant Mom Chao Thanyalak Suksawat, the chief construction engineer of the Department of Highways, on 10 December, 1950, in accordance with government policy.

In 1950, an announcement was made regarding the naming of national highways and major bridges (thai:ต้้งชื่อทางหลวงเเผ่นดินและสะพานขนาตใหญ่) on December 10, 1950. Subsequently, in 1963, the Office of the Prime Minister issued an announcement regarding the National Highway Numbering System of Thailand (1963). As a standardized international numbering system had been adopted for national highways, it was deemed appropriate to abolish all previously assigned names for these highways and implement the National Highway Numbering System of Thailand (1963), dated May 23, 1963. Consequently, the route comprising Pom Phra Chulachomklao – Tha Phra Circle – Rama VI – Rangsit was designated as National Highway No. 405. Subsequently, in 1966, 1968, and 1973, announcements were issued by the Office of the Prime Minister regarding the numbering system for national and provincial highways in Thailand. These superseded the 1966 announcement, which in turn had repealed the Office of the Prime Minister’s announcement dated May 23, 1963, concerning the national highway numbering system of Thailand. Announcement of the Office of the Prime Minister Re: Numbering System for National Highways and Provincial Highways, B.E. 2511 (1968). This announcement repeals the Announcement of the Office of the Prime Minister Re: Numbering System for National Highways and Provincial Highways of Thailand, 1966, dated 25 June 1966. Notification of the Office of the Prime Minister Re: Numbering System for National Highways and Provincial Highways, B.E. 2516 (1973) Consequently, National Highway No. 303—comprising the Dao Khanong–Pom Phra Chun route and the Rat Burana–Phra Samut Chedi route—is utilized, in that order.
