= Na Kluea, Samut Prakan =

Na Kluea นาเกลือ
- Tambon
- Na Kluea
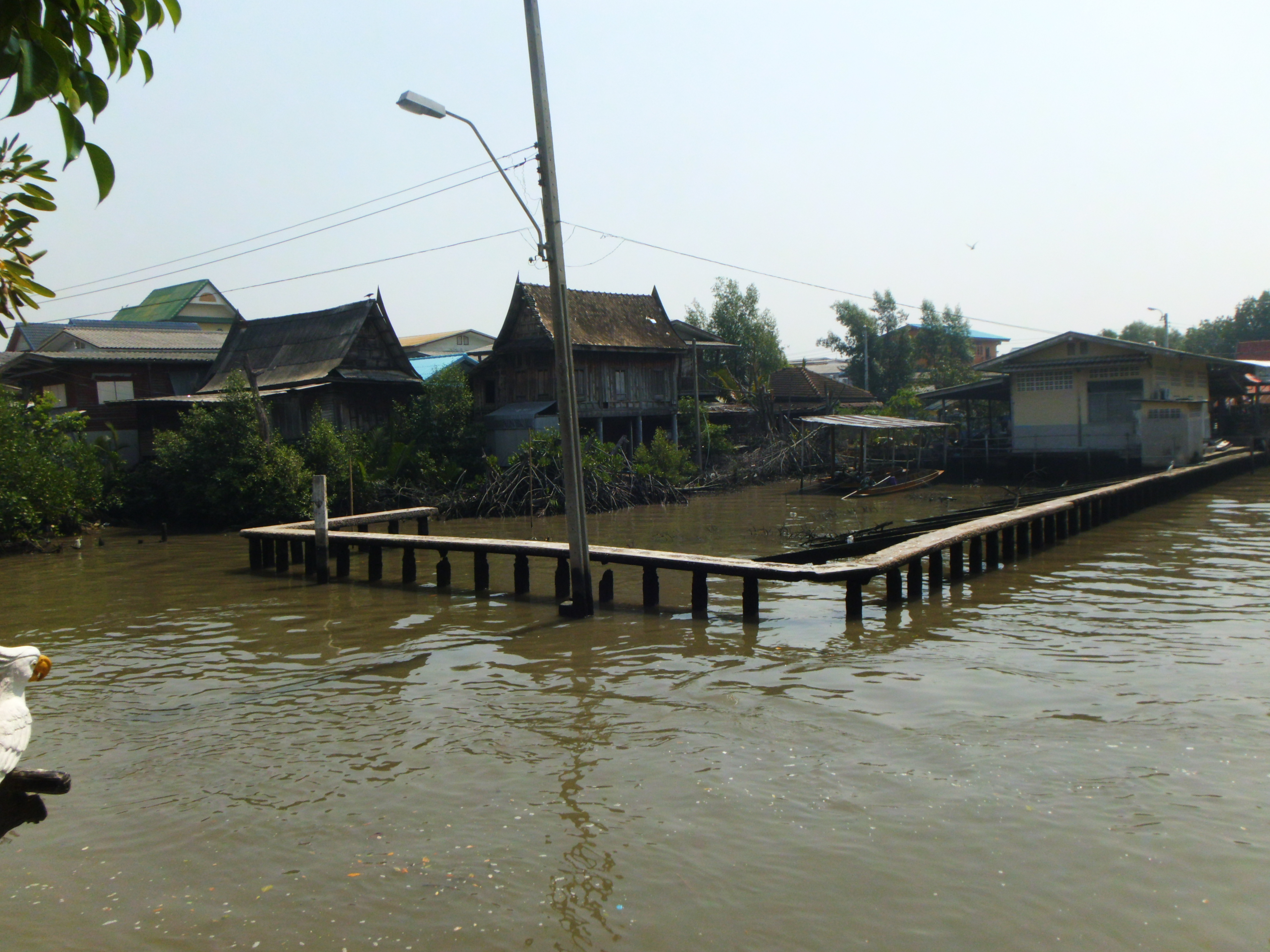
- Typical condition of Na Kluea
- Etymology: Salt Farm
- Nickname: Ban Sakhla
- Location in Bangkok Metropolitan Region
- Coordinates: 13°32′44.55″N 100°30′1.90″E
- Country: Thailand
- Province: Samut Prakan
- District: Phra Samut Chedi

Government
  - Type: Subdistrict Administrative Organization (SAO)
  - Mayor: Chatri Uam-sa-at
  - Vice mayor: Waiyawut Hankhunakul

Area
  - Total: 32.96 km^{2} (12.73 sq mi)

Population (2021)
  - Total: 11,913
  - Density: 361.4/km^{2} (936.1/sq mi)
- Time zone: UTC+7 (ICT)
- Postcode: 10290
- Area code: (+66) 02

Na Kluea (Thai: นาเกลือ, pronounced [nāː klɯ̄a]) is a tambon (sub-district) in Phra Samut Chedi District, Samut Prakan Province, central Thailand.

== History ==
Its name "Na Kluea" means "salt farm" since most of the occupation of the locals in the past was salt farming. The area was originally called "Ban Sakhla" with a long history dating back to the late Sukhothai and early Ayutthaya periods.

The milestone of Ban Sakhla took place in the early Rattanakosin period, corresponds to the King Rama I's reign when the Nine Armies War (1785–86), the last great war between Siam (present-day Thailand) and Burma (present-day Myanmar) occurred. In those days, all the able-bodied men in the village were conscripted for military service leaving only the women, children and old folks behind. When a raiding party of Burmese foraging for food threatened the village, the women rallied everyone and fought off the Burmese. From then on, the village was known as "Ban Sao Kla" (village of courage young women), which over time became Ban Sakhla.

The main water resource is a canal, Khlong Sapphasamit, a man-made waterway dug in 1939. When it was first dug, it wasn't as wide as it is today, actually it was only 16 m (52.5 ft) wide. Its width became bigger due to the erosion of the sea. The Excise Department made this canal a salt transportation mode as there were lots of salt fields in the area. Folks used to farm salt in the area as it is close to the sea. Unfortunately, the amount of salt in the water changed and folks can't farm for salt any longer. The local elders said in some years they could harvest rice in this area. Since Chao Phraya Dam was built (1957), freshwater from the north flows down here and diluted the saltiness in the water. Since then salt fields had to change to shrimp or crab farms.

== Geography ==
The general condition is a lowland where the sea is flooded. It borders Laem Fa Pha, and Nai Khlong Bang Pla Kot in its district to the east, Laem Fa Pha to the south again, across the canal Khlong Khunrat Phinit Chai Tha Kham in Bang Khun Thian District of Bangkok the west, and Ban Khlong Suan in its district to the north.

Na Kluea has a total area of approximately 32.96 square kilometers.

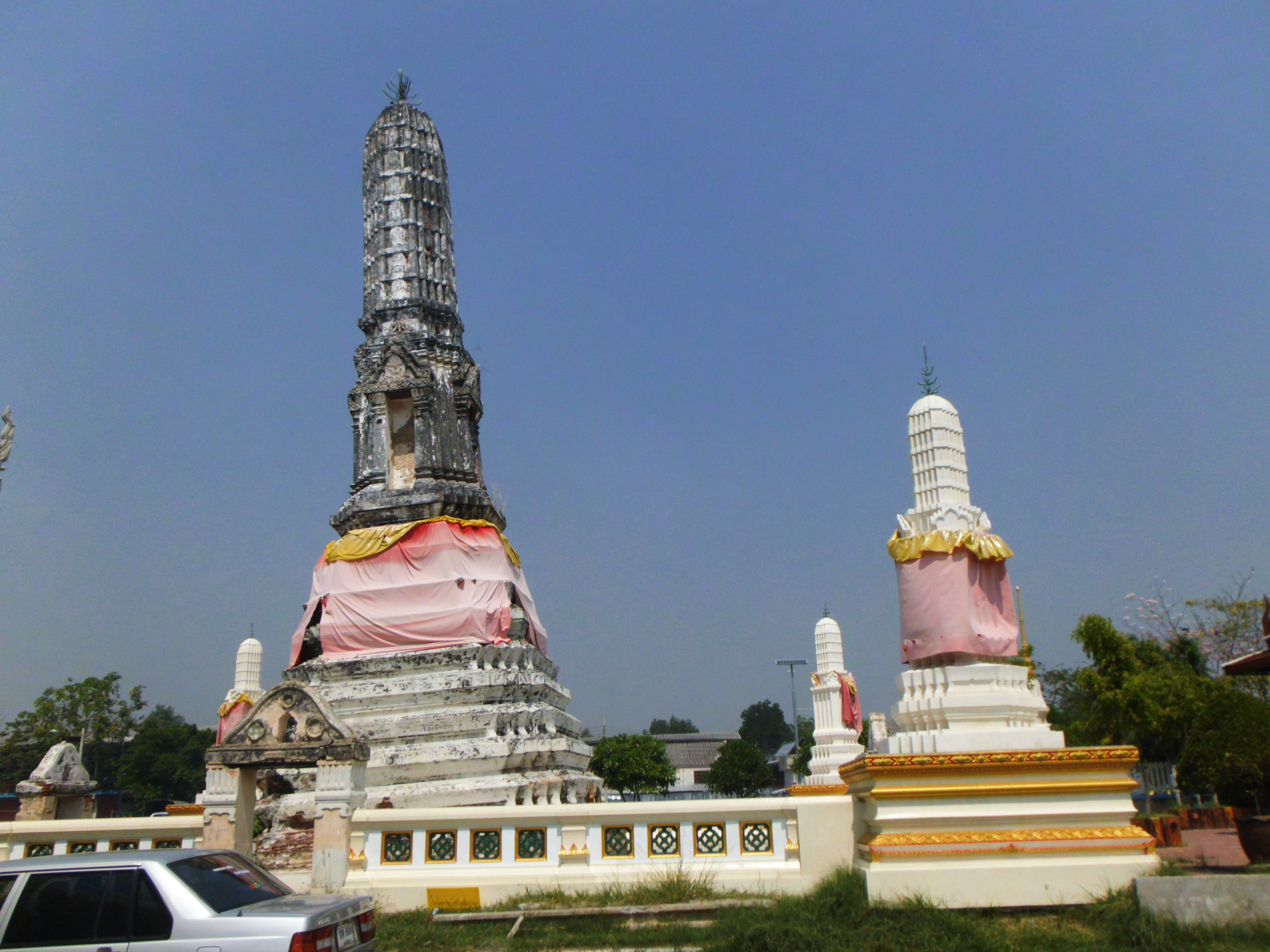
Wat Sakhla

== Administration ==
=== Central administration ===
The entire area of Na Kluea is governed by the Subdistrict Administrative Organization Na Kluea (SAO Na Kluea).

=== Local administration ===
It also consists of eight administrative muban (village)

No.	Name	Thai
1.	Ban Khun Samut Thai	บ้านขุนสมุทรไทย
2.	Ban Khlong Na Kluea	บ้านคลองนาเกลือ
3.	Ban Sakhla	บ้านสาขลา
4.	Ban Sakhla	บ้านสาขลา
5.	Ban Sakhla	บ้านสาขลา
6.	Ban Khlong Tale	บ้านคลองทะเล
7.	Ban Sakhla	บ้านสาขลา
8.	Ban Khlong Kra-om	บ้านคลองกระออม

== Demography ==
As of January 2021, Na Kluea had a total population of 11,913 people (5,788 males and 6,125 females). Most of the population settled on the banks of the canals.

== Economy ==
Most of the people are engaged in fishing, and some components of general employment, government service with private company employees.

== Places ==
- Wat Sakhla
- Wat Si Khong Kha Ram
- Wat Paowanaram
- Sakhla Sutheera Upatham School

It has two child development centres, three primary schools, and four local hospitals.

== Transportation ==
Klong Sapphasamit is the main thoroughfare by waterway. While Suk Sawat–Na Kluea Road is the main thoroughfare by land.
