= Wat Phra Samut Chedi =

Coordinates: 13.600165°N 100.58678°E

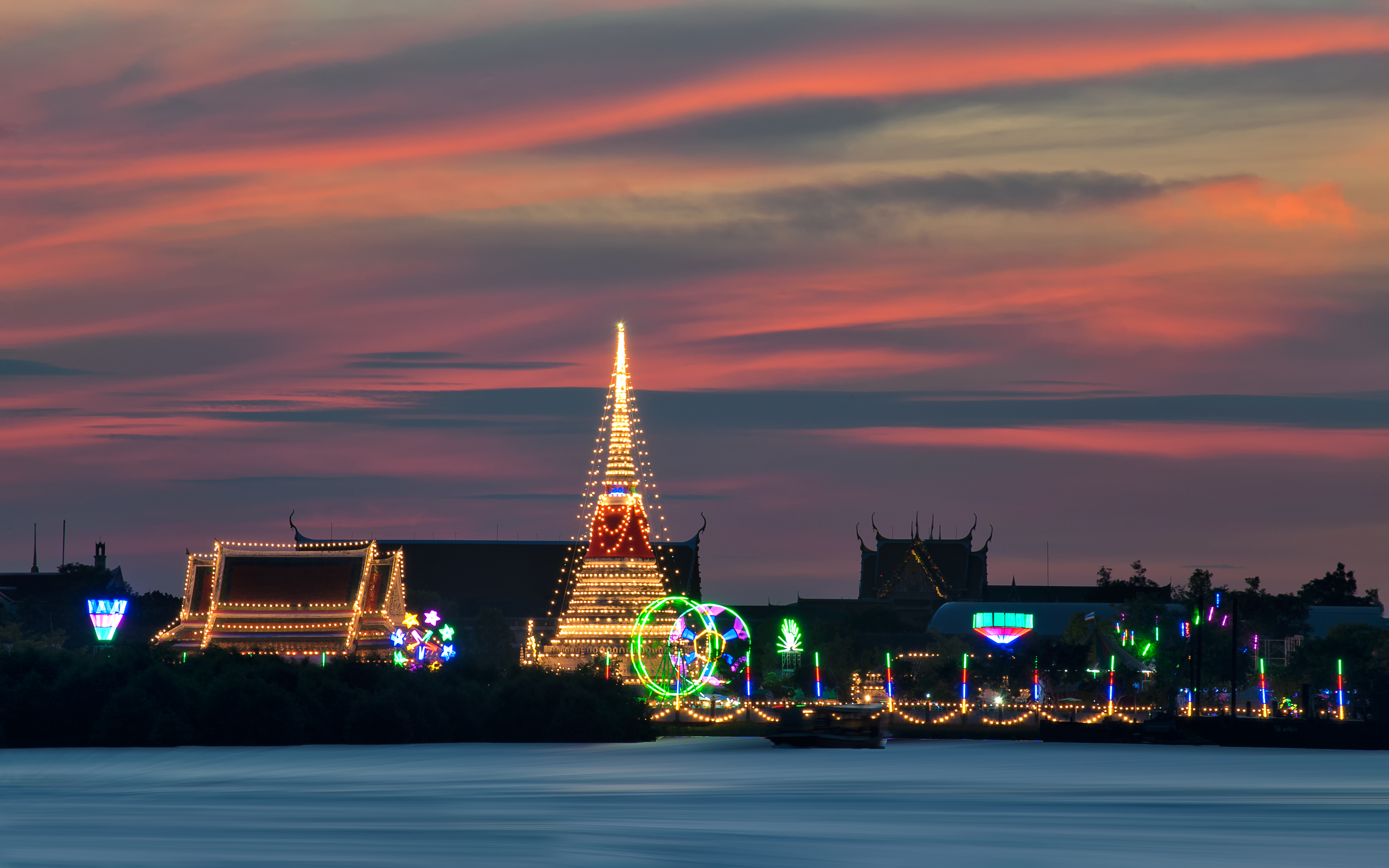
Wat Phra Samut Chedi

Wat Phra Samut Chedi (Thai: วัดพระสมุทรเจดีย์, pronounced [wát pʰráʔ sā.mút t͡ɕēː.dīː]) is an ancient Buddhist temple in Phra Samut Chedi District, Samut Prakan Province, central Thailand.

Lined on the Chao Phraya River's bank in the area of Pak Khlong Bang Pla Ko Sub-district, near Phisuea Samut Fortress and Chulachomklao Fort, which was built to protect the mouth of the Chao Phraya River and played an important role during the "Paknam Incident" (July 1893) in the King Rama V's reign.

The most striking feature of the temple is "Phra Samut Chedi", the chedi (stūpa) of the same name and also the origin of the district where it is located. It was built since the King Rama II's reign but was completed during the subsequent reign, King Rama III in the early Rattanakosin period (18th century). The stūpa was once settled on an island surrounded by the waterway before the water level decreased that it later connected to the mainland. Hence the name "Phra Samut Chedi", which means "ocean stūpa temple".

Wat Phra Samut Chedi is considered one of the oldest and most well-known temples in Samut Prakan. Its stūpa is regarded as a symbol or landmark of the province, inside contains the Buddha's relics, image of Buddha's posture of Phra Ham Samut (pacifying the ocean) and Buddha image, Phra Chai Wat.

On the 5th day of the waning moon of the 11th month of every year (around October), there will be a stūpa worship ceremony. This is the biggest temple fair in Samut Prakan and the one greatest traditions in the province.
