= Phra Samut Chedi district =

Phra Samut Chedi พระสมุทรเจดีย์
- District
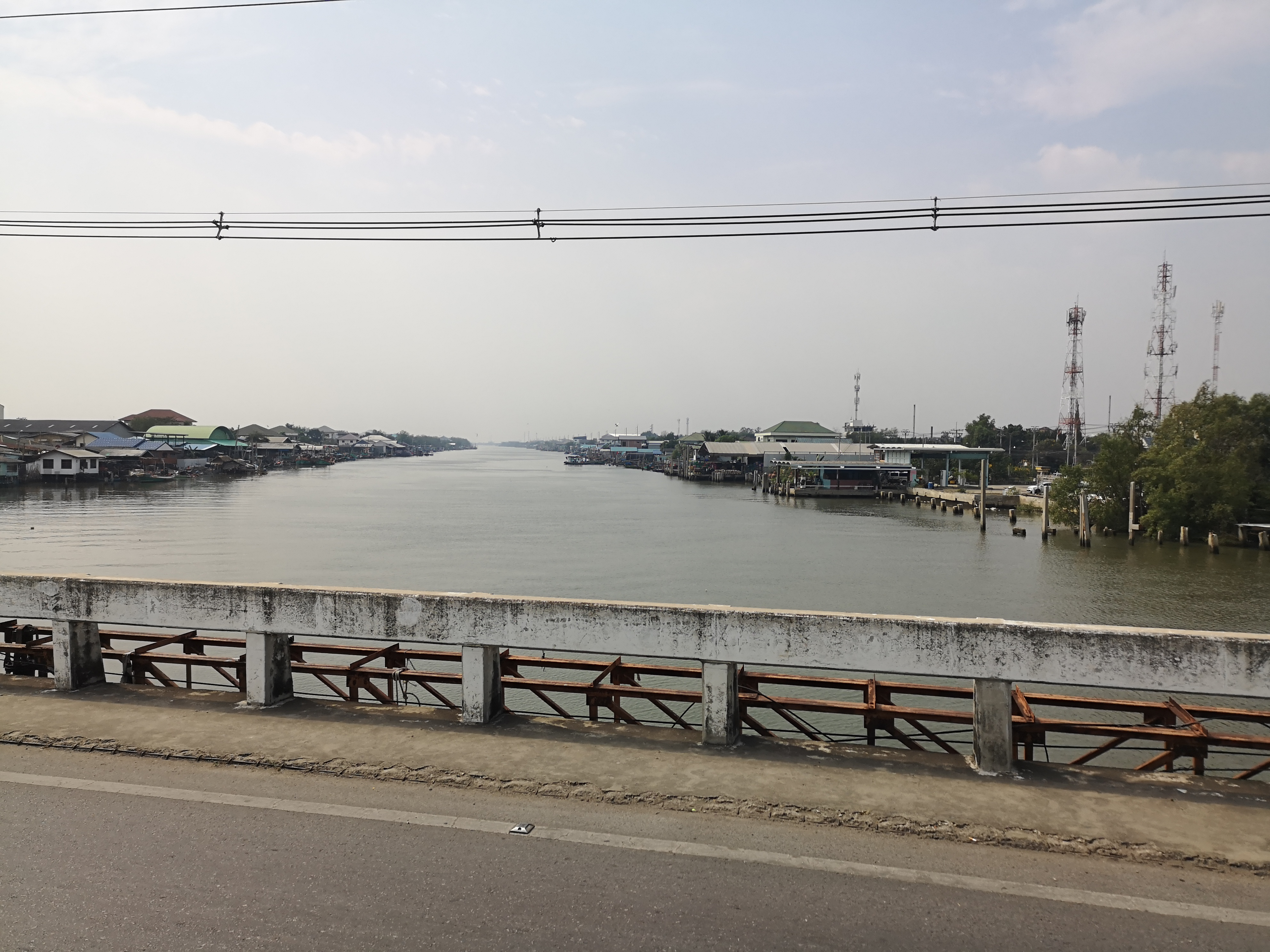
- Khlong Sapphasamit a main watercourse of the district

- District location in Samut Prakan province
- Coordinates: 13°34′7″N 100°33′42″E
- Country: Thailand
- Province: Samut Prakan
- Seat: Laem Fa Pha
- Subdistricts: 5

Area
  - Total: 120.378 km^{2} (46.478 sq mi)

Population (2017)
  - Total: 138,670
  - Density: 1,151.95/km^{2} (2,983.5/sq mi)
- Time zone: UTC+7 (ICT)
- Postal code: 10290
- Geocode: 1105

Phra Samut Chedi (Thai: พระสมุทรเจดีย์, pronounced [pʰráʔ sā.mút tɕēː.dīː]) is the westernmost district (amphoe) of Samut Prakan province in central Thailand.

== Geography ==
Neighboring districts are (from the west, clockwise) Bang Khun Thian and Thung Khru of Bangkok, Phra Pradaeng and (across the Chao Phraya River) Mueang Samut Prakan of Samut Prakan Province.

== History ==
The district was created as a minor district (king amphoe) on 15 December 1984 by splitting off five tambons from Mueang district. It was upgraded to a full district on 15 July 1991.

== Administration ==
The district is divided into five sub-districts (tambons), which are further subdivided into 42 villages (mubans). There are two townships (thesaban tambons): Phra Samut Chedi covers tambon Pak Klong Bang Pla Kot, and Lae Fa Pha covers parts of tambons Laem Fa Pha and Nai Khlong Bang Pla Kot. There are a further four tambon administrative organizations (TAO), for each tambon except Pak Klong Bang Pla Kot, which has no non-municipal area.

No.	Name	Thai name	Villages	Pop.
1.	Na Kluea	นาเกลือ	8	11,625
2.	Ban Khlong Suan	บ้านคลองสวน	4	24,752
3.	Laem Fa Pha	แหลมฟ้าผ่า	13	19,117
4.	Pak Khlong Bang Pla Kot	ปากคลองบางปลากด	4	12,819
5.	Nai Khlong Bang Pla Kot	ในคลองบางปลากด	13	70,357

== Environment ==
The district's coastline has seen severe erosion since the 1990s. Coastal mangrove forests were destroyed then and replaced with shrimp farms. Three to five metres of shoreline has been submerged every year since then, resulting in the loss of 4,000 rai of land to the sea.

Thailand lost almost one third of its coastal mangrove forests between 1961 and 2000. According to Thailand's Department of Marine and Coastal Resources, a quarter of the country's shores—about 700 kilometres (500 miles)—are eroding, some "severely".

== Places ==
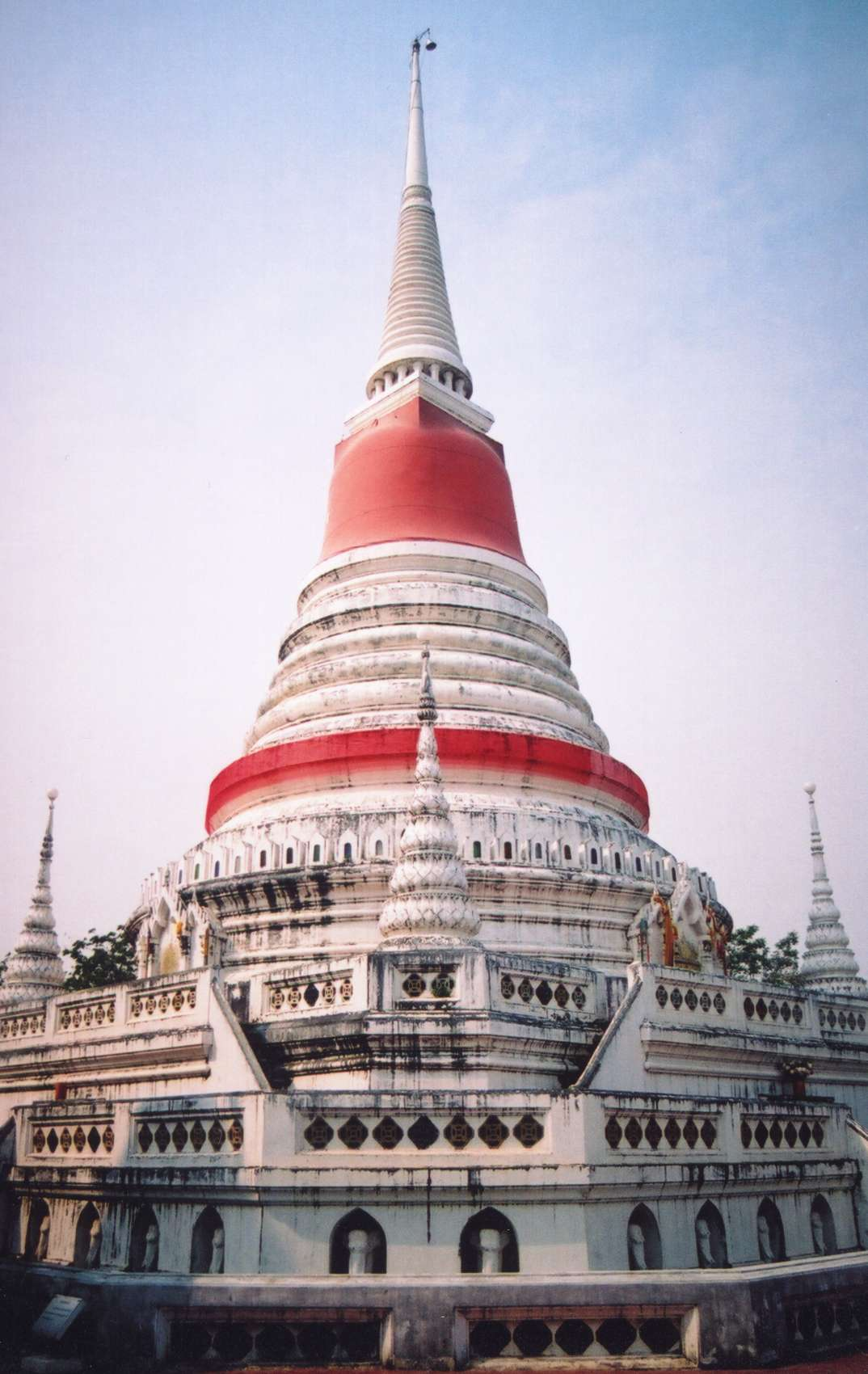
Wat Phra Samut Chedi

The district is named after the temple Phra Samut Chedi, which was built 1827–1828 by King Buddha Loetla Nabhalai (Rama II) on an island in the Chao Phraya River—hence its popular name Phra Chedi Klang Nam ('chedi in the middle of the water'). The island is now connected with the left river bank.

At the mouth of the Chao Phraya is Chulachomklao Fort, built in 1819 and came into use only once during the Paknam crisis in the same year. The fort is now accessible to visitors. The HTMS Maeklong, a former training ship of the Royal Thai Navy, is another attraction in the park.
