= Rattanakosin Kingdom (1782–1932) =

Period of Thai history

Rattanakosin Kingdom (Note: This historical period is more colloquially referred to as the Rattanakosin period in Thailand. The term Rattanakosin can still refer to Thailand today, since Bangkok is still its capital.) อาณาจักรรัตนโกสินทร์ (Thai) Anachak Rattanakosin Kingdom of Siam (Note: Beginning with the Bowring Treaty of 1855, the country was referred to as the "Kingdom of Siam" in diplomatic treaties.) ราชอาณาจักรสยาม (Thai) Ratcha-anachak Sayam
- 1782–1932
- Top: Flag (1832–1916); Bottom: Flag (1917–1932) Top: Coat of arms (1873–1910); Bottom: Emblem (1911–1932)
- Motto: สพฺเพสํ สงฺฆภูตานํ สามคฺคี วุฑฺฒิ สาธิกา; Sabbesaṃ Saṅghabhūtānaṃ Sāmaggī Vuḍḍhi Sādhikā (Pāḷi); "Unity Amongst Those Uniting Brings About Success and Prosperity"
- Anthem: จอมราชจงเจริญ Chom Rat Chong Charoen "Long Live the Great King" (1852–1871); บุหลันลอยเลื่อน Bulan Loi Luean "The Floating Moon on the Sky" (1871–1888); สรรเสริญพระบารมี Sansoen Phra Barami "Praise the King" (1888–1932)
- Capital: Bangkok
- Official languages: Thai (Siamese)
- Spoken languages: Central Thai, Southern Thai, Northern Thai, Lao, Khmer, Malay, various Chinese languages
- Religion: Majority: Theravada Buddhism (official); Minority: Hinduism, Christianity, Islam
- Demonym: Siamese
- Government: Mandala monarchy (1782–1892); Absolute monarchy (1892–1932)
- Monarch
  - 1782–1809 (first): Phutthayotfa Chulalok
  - 1809–1824: Phutthaloetla Naphalai
  - 1824–1851: Nangklao
  - 1851–1868: Mongkut
  - 1868–1910: Chulalongkorn
  - 1910–1925: Vajiravudh
  - 1925–1932 (last): Prajadhipok
- Viceroy
  - 1782–1803 (first): Maha Sura Singhanat
  - 1868–1885 (last): Wichaichan
- Legislature: None (Note: From 1925 to 1932, it had an established legislative council called Supreme Council of State of Siam, although it had no legislative powers.)
- Historical era: Early modern era, modern period
  - Establishment: 6 April 1782
  - Nine Armies' Wars: 1785–1786
  - Burney Treaty: 20 June 1826
  - Lao Rebellion: 1826–1828
  - War with Vietnam: 1841–1845
  - Westernization and modernization: 1851–1932
  - Bowring Treaty: 18 April 1855
  - Front Palace Crisis: 1874–1875
  - Franco-Siamese crisis of 1893: July–October 1893
  - Palace Revolt: 1 April 1912
  - Declarations of war on Germany and Austria-Hungary: 22 July 1917
  - Siamese revolution: 24 June 1932

Area
- 1805: 1,119,354 km^{2} (432,185 sq mi)
- 1893 (Note: 1800 (Lieberman), early 19th century (Baker-Phongpaichit).): 726,621 km^{2} (280,550 sq mi)

Population
  - 1805: ~5,000,000
  - 1893 (Note: 1800 (Lieberman), early 19th century (Baker-Phongpaichit).): ~6,000,000
  - 1929: 11,506,207
- Currency: Photduang (until 1904); Baht (tical) (from 1860)
- Time zone: UTC+07:00 (ICT)
- Date format: dd/mm/yyyy (CS (until 1889), RE (from 1889–1912), BE (from 1912))
- Calling code: +66
Preceded by
Thonburi Kingdom
Kingdom of Chiang Mai
Kingdom of Vientiane
Kingdom of Luang Phrabang
Kingdom of Champasak
Nakhon Si Thammarat Kingdom
Principality of Hà Tiên
Sip Song Chau Tai
Chiang Hung
Patani Kingdom
Kedah Sultanate
Terengganu
Kelantan
Kengtung State
Succeeded by
Kingdom of Siam
British Malaya
French Indochina
British Burma
- Today part of: Thailand; Cambodia; Laos; Malaysia; Myanmar; Vietnam; China; Germany (Note: Siamese occupation of Germany (Neustadt an der Weinstraße))

The Rattanakosin Kingdom, (Note: Thai: อาณาจักรรัตนโกสินทร์, RTGS: Anachak Rattanakosin, pronounced [ʔāː.nāː.tɕàk rát.tā.ná(ʔ).kōː.sǐn]) also known as the Kingdom of Siam (Note: Thai: ราชอาณาจักรสยาม, RTGS: Ratcha-anachak Sayam) after 1855, refers to the Siamese kingdom (in modern-day Thailand) between 1782 and 1932. It was founded in 1782 with the establishment of Rattanakosin (Bangkok), which replaced the city of Thonburi as the capital of Siam.

The kingdom governed based on the mandala system. This allows for high-autonomy locally with the kingdom influencing and effectively ruling its area of suzerainty. At its zenith in 1805 to 1812, the Kingdom was composed of 25 polities, ranging from duchies and principalities to federations and kingdoms. With the furthest extent reaching the Shan States, southern Yunnan, Laos, Cambodia, northern Si Rat Malai and Kawthoung. The kingdom was founded by Rama I of the Chakri dynasty. The first half of this period was characterized by the consolidation of Siamese power in the center of Mainland Southeast Asia and was punctuated by contests and wars for regional supremacy with rival powers Burma and Vietnam. The second period was one of engagements with the colonial powers of Britain and France in which Siam remained the only Southeast Asian state to maintain its independence.

Internally, the kingdom developed into a centralized, absolutist, nation state with borders defined by interactions with Western powers. The period was marked by the increased centralization of the monarch's powers, the abolition of labor control, the transition to an agrarian economy, the expansion of control over distant tributary states, the creation of a monolithic national identity, and the emergence of an urban middle class. However, the failure to implement democratic reforms culminated in the Siamese revolution of 1932 and the establishment of a constitutional monarchy.

== Etymology ==
Rattanakosin is the proper term used by Thai historiography to cover the historical period of the first seven Chakri rulers, between the founding of Bangkok as the capital city of Thailand in 1782 and the end of the absolute monarchy in 1932, and was therefore never the official name of the country historically. The name Rattanakosin was first coined as part of the full name of Bangkok during the reign of Rama IV (r. 1851-68).

Diplomatically, from the Ayutthaya Era until 1938, and later temporarily reinstated in 1946, Thailand was internationally recognized by the name "Siam".

In some 19th century foreign documents, Siam was alternatively referred to as "Ayutthaya" or "Siam-Ayutthaya".

== History ==
=== Early Rattanakosin period (1782–1855) ===
==== Foundation of Bangkok ====
Chakri ruled under the name Ramathibodi, but was generally known as King Rama I, he moved the royal seat from Thonburi on the west bank of Chao Phraya River to the east bank, to the village of Bang Makok, meaning "place of olive plums". This was done due to its better strategic position in defenses against Burmese invasions from the West, the area was protected from attack by the river to the west and by a series of canals to the north, east and south. The east bank was surrounded by low marshlands inhabited by the Chinese, whom King Rama I ordered to move to Sampheng. The official foundation date of Bangkok is 21 April 1782 when the city pillar was consecrated in a ceremony. King Rama I underwent an abbreviated form of coronation in 1782. He founded the Chakri dynasty and made his younger brother Chao Phraya Surasi the Wangna or Prince Sura Singhanat of the Front Palace. In 1783, the Bangkok city walls were constructed with part of the bricks taken from the Ayutthaya ruins. Lao and Cambodian laborers were assigned to dig the city moat. The Grand Palace and the Wat Phra Kaew were completed in 1784 and the Emerald Buddha was transferred from Wat Arun to be placed in Wat Phra Kaew. In 1785, King Rama I performed a full coronation ceremony and named the new city "Rattanakosin", which meant the "Jewel of Indra" referring to the Emerald Buddha.

==== Burmese wars ====
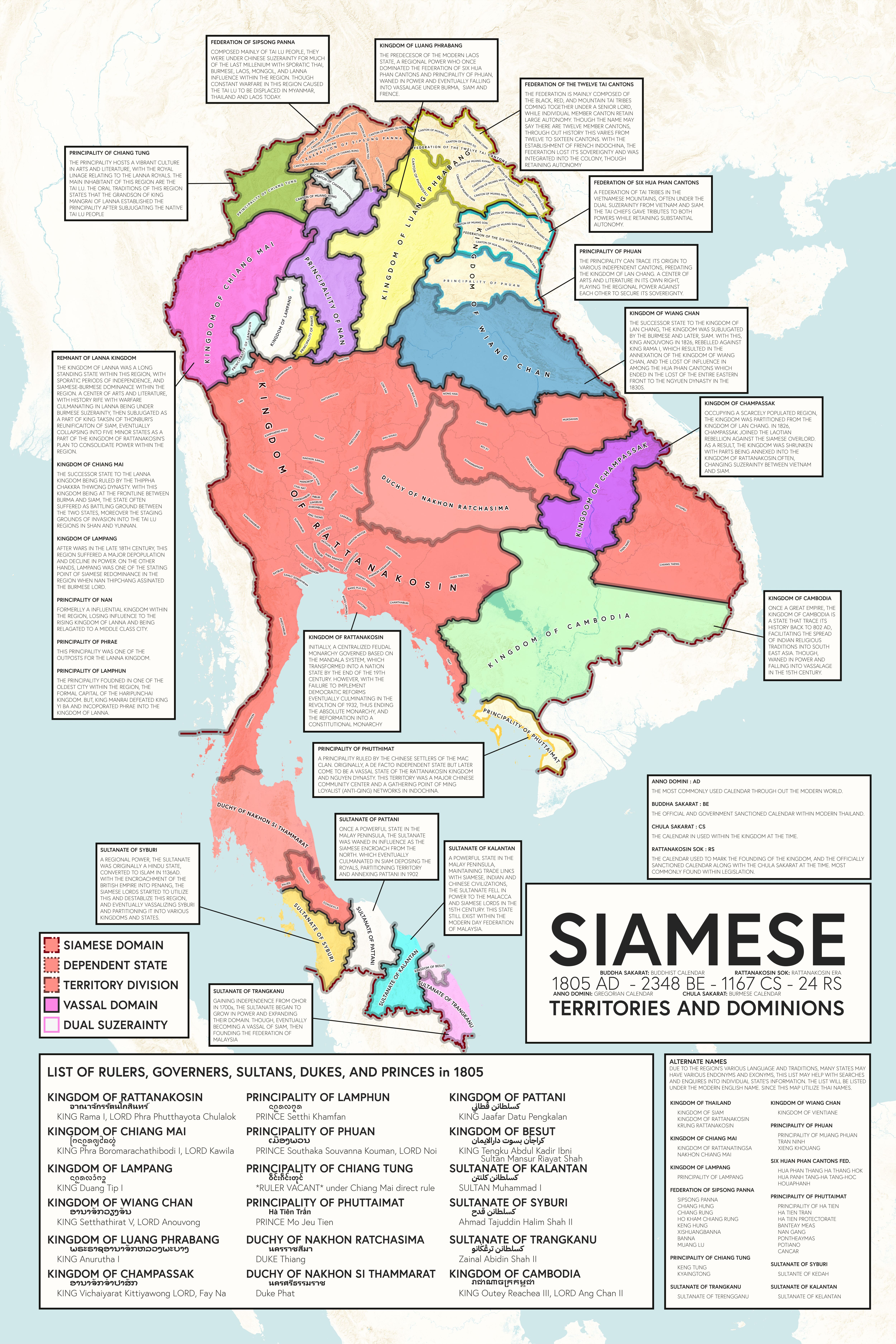
Siamese territory and dominion at its largest in 1805 resulting from the Burmese–Siamese War of 1802–1805

The Burmese continued to pose a major threat to the Siamese state of existence. In 1785, King Bodawpaya of the Burmese Konbaung dynasty sent massive armies to invade Siam in five directions during the Nine Armies' War. Decades of continuous warfare had left Siam depopulated and the Siamese court managed to muster only a total of 70,000 men against the 144,000 men of Burmese invaders. The Burmese, however, were over-stretched and unable to converge. Prince Sura Singhanat led his army to defeat the main army of King Bodawpaya in the Battle of Latya in Kanchanaburi in 1786. In the north, the Burmese laid siege on Lanna Lampang. Kawila, the ruler of Lampang, managed to hold the siege for four months until relief forces from Bangkok came to rescue Lampang. In the south, Lady Chan and Lady Mook were able to fend off Burmese attacks on Thalang (Phuket) in 1786. After the unfruitful campaign, King Bodawpaya sent his son Uparaja Thado Minsaw to invade Kanchanaburi concentrating only in one direction. King Rama I and his brother Prince Sura Singhanat defeated the Burmese in the Tha Dindaeng Campaign in 1786–1787.

After these victories over Burmese invaders, Siam staged offensives on the Tenasserim Coast, which was the former territory of Ayutthaya. King Rama I marched Siamese armies to lay siege on Tavoy in 1788 but did not succeed. In 1792, the Burmese governors of Tavoy and Mergui defected to Siam. Siam came to temporarily occupy the Tenasserim Coast. However, as the court was preparing for the invasions of Lower Burma, King Bodawpaya sent his son Thado Minsaw to reclaim Tenasserim. The Siamese were soundly defeated by the Burmese in the Battle of Tavoy in 1793 and ceded the Tenasserim Coast to Burma for perpetuity, becoming modern Tanintharyi Division.

Lord Kawila was finally able to re-establish Chiang Mai as the centre of Lanna in 1797. King Bodawpaya was eager to regain Burmese control over Lanna. The Burmese invaded Chiang Mai in 1797 and 1802, in both occasions Kawila defended the city and Prince Sura Singhanat marched north to relieve Chiang Mai. The Siamese and Lanna forces then proceeded to capture Chiang Saen, the stronghold of Burmese authority in Lanna, in 1804, eliminating Burmese influence in that region. Siamese victories over the Burmese in Lanna allowed Siam to expand domination north towards the northernmost Tai princedoms: Keng Tung and Chianghung. Kawila of Chiang Mai sent forces to raid Keng Tung in 1802 and subjugated Mong Yawng, Mueang Luang Phukha, and Chiang Hung in 1805. In 1805, the Prince of Nan invaded the Tai Lue confederacy of Sipsongpanna and Chiang Hung surrendered.

Prince Sura Singhanat died in 1803. King Rama I appointed his own son Prince Itsarasunthon as the succeeding Prince of the Front Palace in 1806. King Rama I died in 1809 and Prince Itsarasunthon ascended the throne to become King Rama II. King Bodawpaya then took the opportunity to initiate the Burmese invasion of Thalang on the Andaman Coast. Meanwhile, the court in Bangkok sent armies to relieve Thalang but faced logistic difficulties and Thalang fell to the Burmese in 1810. However, the Siamese were still able to repel the Burmese from Thalang. The Burmese invasion of Phuket in 1809–1810 was the last Burmese incursion into Siamese territories in Thai history. Siam remained vigilant of prospective Burmese invasions through the 1810s. Only when Burma ceded Tenasserim to the British in the Treaty of Yandabo in 1826 in the aftermath of the First Anglo-Burmese War that Burmese threats effectively ended.

==== Siamese–Vietnamese Wars ====
When Siamese forces took Vientiane in 1779 during the Thonburi period, all three Lao kingdoms of Luang Phrabang, Vientiane and Champasak came under Siamese domination. Lao Princes Nanthasen, Inthavong and Anouvong were taken as hostages to Bangkok. In 1782, King Rama I installed Nanthasen as King of Vientiane. However, Nanthasen was dethroned in 1795 due to his alleged diplomatic overtures with the Tây Sơn dynasty in favor of Inthavong. When King Inthavong died in 1804, Anouvong succeeded as King of Vientiane.

Yumreach Baen, a pro-Siamese Cambodian noble, staged a coup in Cambodia to overthrow and kill the pro-Vietnamese Cambodian Prime Minister Tolaha Mu in 1783. Chaos and upheavals that ensued caused Yumreach Baen to take young King Ang Eng to Bangkok. King Rama I appointed Yumreach Baen as Chaophraya Aphaiphubet. Also in 1783, Nguyễn Phúc Ánh arrived in Bangkok to take refuge from the Tây Sơn rebels. In 1784, Siamese forces invaded Saigon to reinstate Nguyễn Phúc Ánh but were defeated in the Battle of Rạch Gầm-Xoài Mút by the Tây Sơn. In 1789, Aphaiphubet took control of Cambodia and became the Regent. Later that same year Nguyễn Phúc Ánh took Saigon and established himself in Southern Vietnam. In 1794, King Rama I allowed Ang Eng to return to Cambodia to rule as king and carved the northwestern part of Cambodia including Battambang and Siemreap for Aphaiphubet to govern as governor under direct Siamese rule.

King Ang Eng of Cambodia died in 1796 and was succeeded by his son Ang Chan II who became pro-Vietnamese. While the pro-Siamese Prince Ang Sngoun, younger brother of Ang Chan II, decided to rebel against his brother in 1811. The Siamese forces marched from Battambang to Oudong. The panicked King Ang Chan II fled to take refuge at Saigon under the protection of Vietnam. Siamese forces sacked Oudong and returned. Lê Văn Duyệt brought Ang Chan II back to Phnom Penh to rule under Vietnamese influence.

King Anouvong of Vientiane rebelled against Siam in 1827. He led the Lao armies to capture Nakhon Ratchasima and Saraburi, while his son King Raxabut Nyô of Champasak invaded Southern Isan. Phraya Palat and his wife Lady Mo led the Siamese captives to rise against their Lao overseers in the Battle of Samrit Fields. King Rama III sent Prince Sakdiphonlasep of the Front Palace to defeat Anouvong at Nong Bua Lamphu and Phraya Ratchasuphawadi (later Chaophraya Bodindecha) to capture Raxabut Nyô. Anouvong and his family fled to Nghệ An Province of Vietnam under protection of Emperor Ming Mạng. Ming Mạng sent Anouvong back to Vientiane to negotiate with Siam. However, Anouvong retook control of Vientiane only to be pushed back by Phraya Ratchasuphawadi in 1828. Anouvong was eventually captured and sent to Bangkok where he was imprisoned and died in 1829.

Anouvong's rebellion worsened Siamese-Vietnamese relations. Lê Văn Duyệt died in 1832 and his posthumous punishments by Ming Mạng spurred the Lê Văn Khôi rebellion at Saigon in 1833. King Rama III took the opportunity to eliminate Vietnamese influence in the region. He assigned Chaophraya Bodindecha to lead armies on invading Cambodia and Saigon, while Chaophraya Phrakhlang led the fleet. However, the Siamese forces were defeated in the naval Battle of Vàm Nao and retreated. The Siamese defeat confirmed Vietnamese domination over Cambodia. Ming Mạng annexed Cambodia into Trấn Tây Province with Trương Minh Giảng as the governor. After the death of Ang Chan II, Minh Mạng also installed Ang Mey as puppet queen regnant of Cambodia. In 1840, the Cambodians arose in general rebellion against Vietnamese domination. Bodindecha marched Siamese armies to attack Pursat and Kampong Svay in 1841. The new Vietnamese Emperor Thiệu Trị ordered the Vietnamese to retreat and the Siamese took over Cambodia. The war resumed in 1845 when Emperor Thiệu Trị sent Nguyễn Tri Phương to successfully take Phnom Penh and lay siege on Siamese-held Oudong. After months of siege, Siam and Vietnam negotiated for peace with Prince Ang Duong, who would recognize both Siamese and Vietnamese suzerainty, installed as the new King of Cambodia in 1848.

==== Malay Peninsula and contacts with the West ====
After the fall of Ayutthaya in 1767, the Northern Malay states that used to pay bunga mas tributes to Siam were freed temporarily from Siamese domination. In 1786, after expelling Burmese invaders from Southern Siam, Prince Sura Singhanat declared that the Northern Malay sultanates should resume tributary obligations as it had during the Ayutthaya period. Kedah and Terengganu resolved to send tributes but Pattani refused. The Siamese prince then sent armies to sack Pattani in 1786, bringing Pattani into Siamese rule. The Malay states of Pattani, Kedah and Terengganu (including Kelantan, which was then part of Terengganu) came under Siamese suzerainty as tributary states. Pattani rebelled in 1789–1791 and 1808. Siam ended up dividing Pattani into seven distinct townships to rule. Kelantan was separated from Terengganu in 1814. In 1821, Sultan Ahmad Tajuddin Halim Shah II (known in Thai sources as Tuanku Pangeran) of Kedah was found forging an alliance with Burma – Siam's longtime rival. Siamese forces under Phraya Nakhon Noi the "Raja of Ligor" invaded and captured Kedah. Sultan Ahmad Tajuddin took refuge in British-held Penang. A son of Nakhon Noi was installed as the governor of Kedah. The Kedah sultanate ceased to exist for a time being.

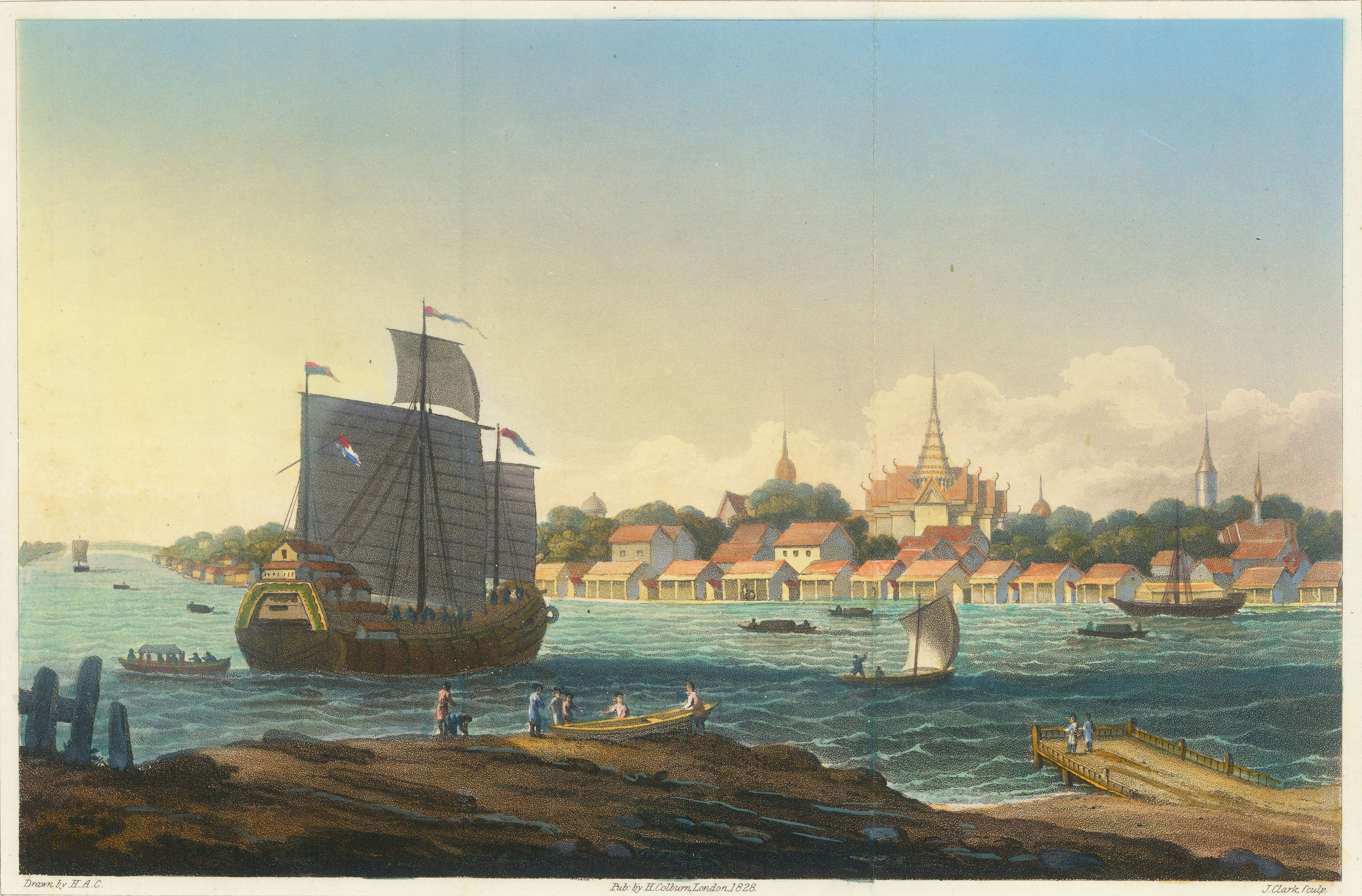
View of the city of Bangkok in 1828

Since the 15th century, the Siamese royal court had retained a monopoly on foreign trades through the Phra Khlang Sinkha (พระคลังสินค้า) or Royal Warehouse. Foreign merchants had to present their ships and goods at Phra Khlang Sinkha for tariffs to be levied and goods to be purchased by the Royal Warehouse. Foreigners could not directly and privately trade important profitable government-restricted goods with the native Siamese. In 1821, the Governor-General of British India, in the mission to establish trade contacts with Siam, sent John Crawfurd to Bangkok. Crawfurd arrived in Bangkok in 1822, delivering both the British concern of Sultan Ahmad Tajuddin and also for demands of trade concessions; however the negotiations soured. Siam sent troops to aid the British in Tenasserim in the First Anglo-Burmese War. However, a dispute prompted King Rama III to withdraw the Siamese armies from Burma. In 1825, the British sent another mission led by Henry Burney to Bangkok. The Anglo-Siamese Burney Treaty was signed in 1826, in which centuries-old royal Siamese monopoly over Western trades ended, this allowed the British to trade freely in Siam. The treaty also recognized Siamese claims over Kedah. However, some trade restrictions including the Phasi Pak Ruea (ภาษีปากเรือ) or measurement duties were still intact. Siam also concluded the similar "Roberts Treaty" with the United States in 1833.

Tunku Kudin, a nephew of the former Kedah sultan, reclaimed Kedah by force in 1831 and rose up against Siam. Pattani, Kelantan and Terengganu joined on the Kedahan side against Siam. King Rama III sent forces under Nakhon Noi and a navy fleet under Chaophraya Phrakhlang to put down the Malay insurgency. The Raja of Ligor recaptured Kedah in 1832. In 1838, Tunku Muhammad Sa'ad, another nephew of the Kedah sultan, in concert with Wan Muhammad Ali (called Wan Mali in Thai sources) an Andaman Sea adventurer, again retook Alor Setar from the Siamese. Kedahan forces invaded Southern Siam, attacking Trang, Pattani and Songkhla. King Rama III sent a fleet, led by Phraya Siphiphat (younger brother of Phrakhlang), to quell the rebellion. Siamese forces recaptured Alor Setar in 1839. Chaophraya Nakhon Noi the Raja of Ligor died in 1838, leaving Malay affairs to Phraya Siphiphat. The latter then divided Kedah into four states: Setul, Kubang Pasu, Perlis and Kedah proper. The former Kedah sultan reconciled with the Siamese and he was finally restored as Sultan of Kedah in 1842. The journey of Phraya Siphiphat to the south in 1839 coincided with the Kelantanese Civil War. Sultan Muhammad II of Kelantan had conflicts with his rival contender Tuan Besar and requested for military aid from Phraya Siphiphat. Siphiphat, however, posted himself as the negotiator and forced a peace agreement upon the warring Kelantanese factions. Tuan Besar rebelled again in 1840. Siam resolved to move Tuan Besar to somewhere else to placate the conflicts. Eventually, Tuan Besar was made the ruler of Pattani in 1842, becoming Sultan Phaya Long Muhammad of Pattani. His descendants would continue to rule Pattani until 1902.

After the First Opium War, the British Empire emerged as the most powerful maritime power in the region and was eager for more favorable trade agreements. By the 1840s, Siam had re-imposed trade tariffs through the Chinese tax collector system. Both the British and the Americans sent their delegates (Brooke and Balestier) to Bangkok in 1850 to propose treaty amendments but were strongly rejected. Only with the Bowring Treaty of 1855 that these goals were achieved, liberalizing the Siamese economy and ushering a new period of Thai history. King Rama III reportedly said on his deathbed in 1851: "...there will be no more wars with Vietnam and Burma. We will have them only with the West". King Mongkut, who had been a Buddhist monk for 27 years, ascended the throne in 1851 with support from the Bunnag family. King Mongkut made his younger brother Pinklao the Vice-King or Second King of the Front Palace. Mongkut also granted the exceptionally high rank of Somdet Chaophraya to the Bunnag brothers – Chaophraya Phrakhlang (Dit Bunnag) and Phraya Siphiphat (Dat Bunnag), who became Somdet Chaophraya Prayurawong and Somdet Chaophraya Phichaiyat, respectively, cementing the roles and powers of the Bunnag family in Siamese foreign affairs during the mid-19th century. Chuang Bunnag, Prayurawong's son, became Chaophraya Sri Suriwongse.

=== Early modern Siam (1855–1909) ===
==== Bowring Treaty and consequences ====
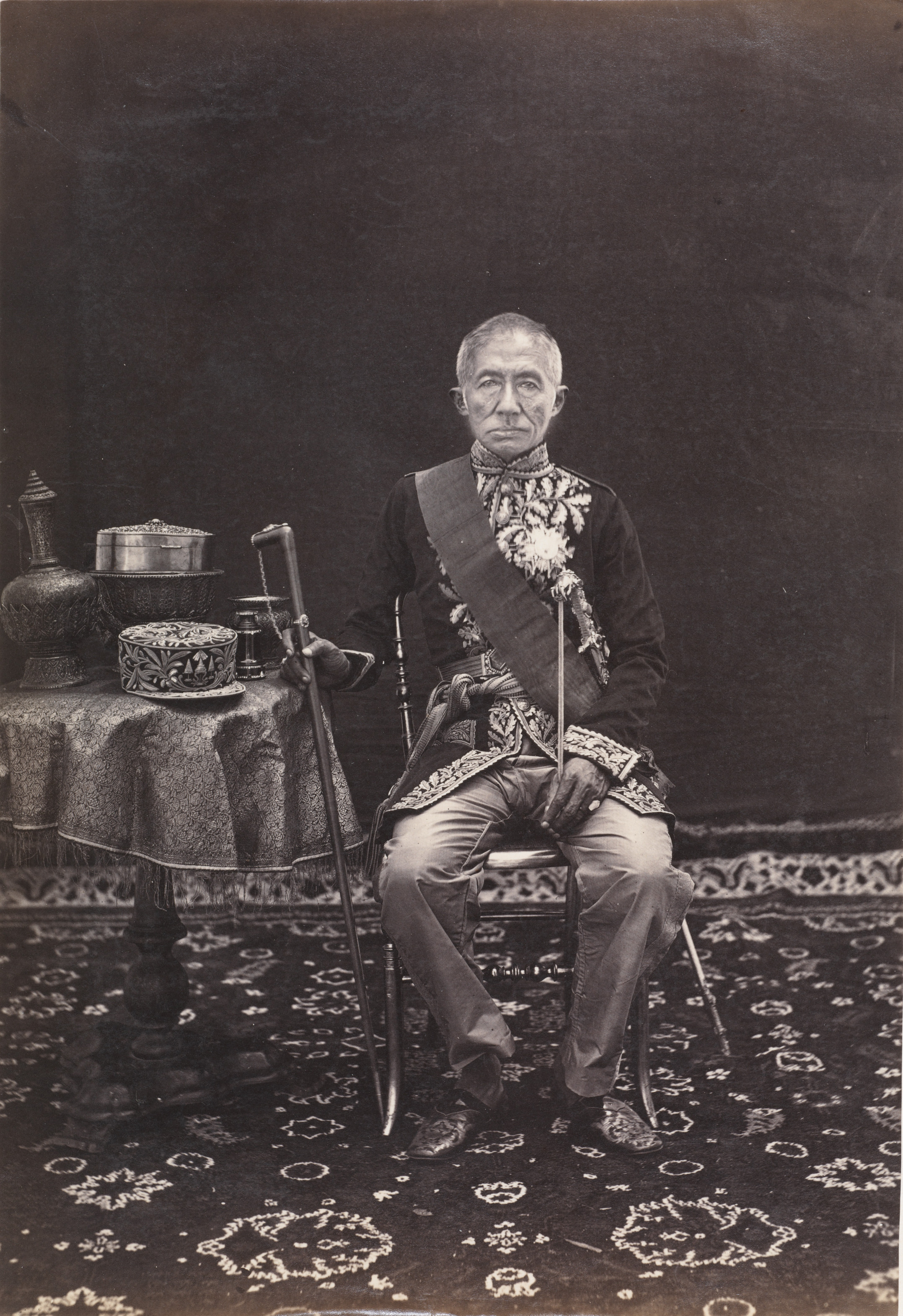
Photograph of King Mongkut (Rama IV) (r. 1853–1868) in western style uniform

King Mongkut and Chaophraya Sri Suriwongse realized that, due to the geopolitical situation, Siam could stand no more against British demands for concessions. Sir John Bowring the Governor of Hong Kong, who was the representative of the British government in London (rather than East India Company), arrived at Bangkok in 1855. The Bowring Treaty was signed in April 1855, in which tariffs were reduced and standardized to three percent and the Phasi Pak Ruea (measurement duties) was abolished. The treaty granted extraterritoriality to the British in Siam, who would be subject to a British consular authority and British law instead of traditional Siamese inquisition, as Westerners sought to dissociate themselves from Siamese Nakhonban methods of judiciary tortures. The treaty also stipulated the establishment of a British consulate in Bangkok. The Bowring Treaty was followed by similar 'unequal treaties' with other Western nations including the United States (Townsend Harris, May 1856), France (Charles de Montigny, August 1856), Denmark (1858), Portugal (1858), the Netherlands (1860) and Prussia (Eulenberg, 1861), all of which Prince Wongsa Dhiraj Snid, Mongkut's younger half-brother, and Chaophraya Sri Suriwongse (called 'Kalahom' in Western sources) were the main negotiators. King Mongkut also declared freedom of religion to his subjects in 1858.

A white elephant, facing the hoist, centred on a red field. National ensign decreed by King Mongkut (Rama IV).

The Bowring Treaty had a great socioeconomic impact on Siam, the Siamese economy was liberalized; it began to transform from a self-subsistence to export-oriented economy and was incorporated into the world economy. The liberation of rice export, which had been previously restricted, led to rapid growth of rice plantations and production in Central Siam as rice arose to become Siam's top export commodity. The increased scale of production led to demands for manpower in the industry that rendered the traditional corvée system less useful and thus social changes were needed. The Bowring Treaty of 1855 marks the beginning of 'modern' Siam in most histories. However, these commercial concessions took a drastic effect on government revenues, which was sacrificed in the name of national security and trade liberalization. The government relied on the corrupt and ineffective Chinese tax collector system to generate and levy numerous new tax farms that would compensate revenue loss. The disarray of the Siamese tax system would lead to fiscal reforms in 1873.

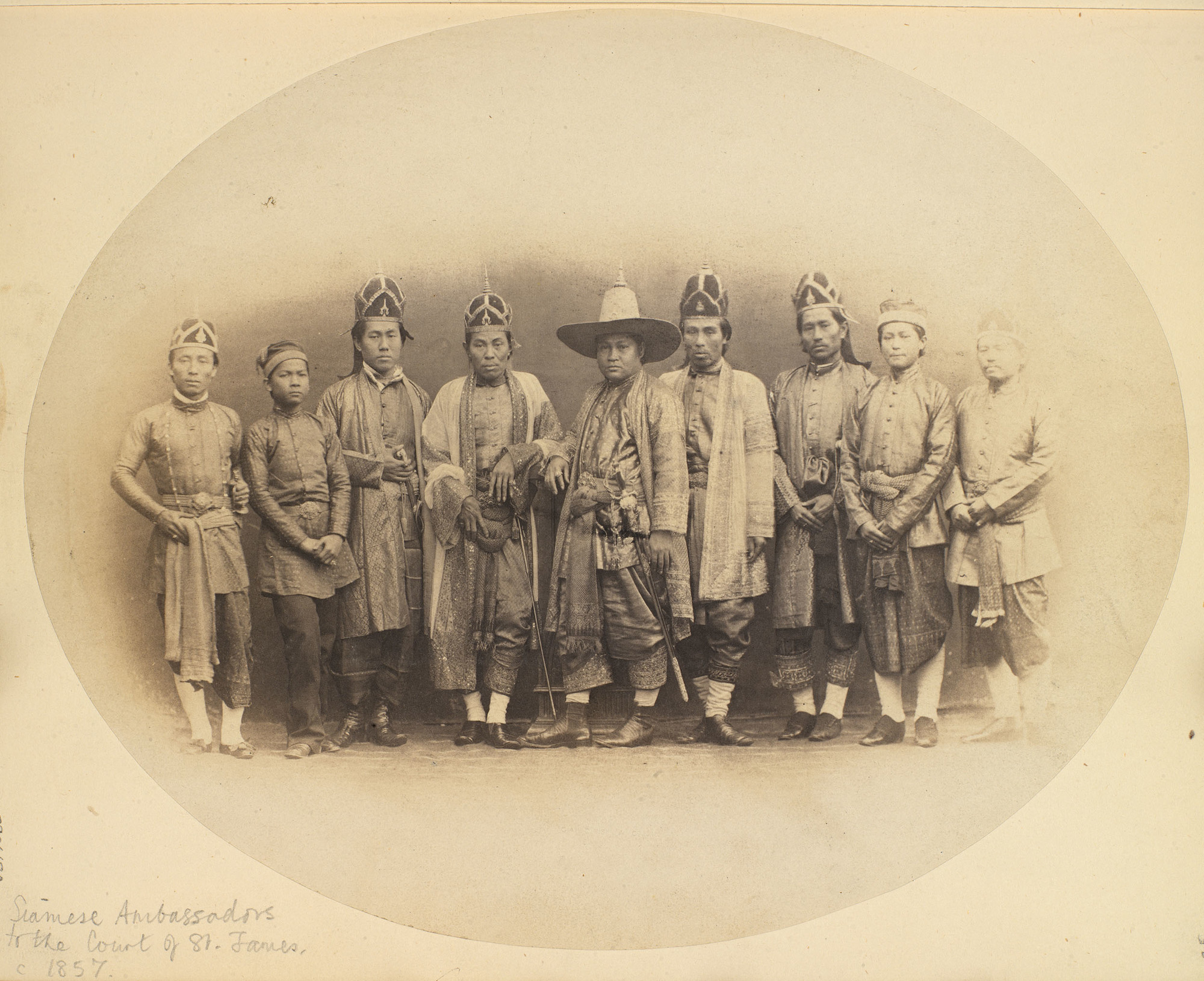
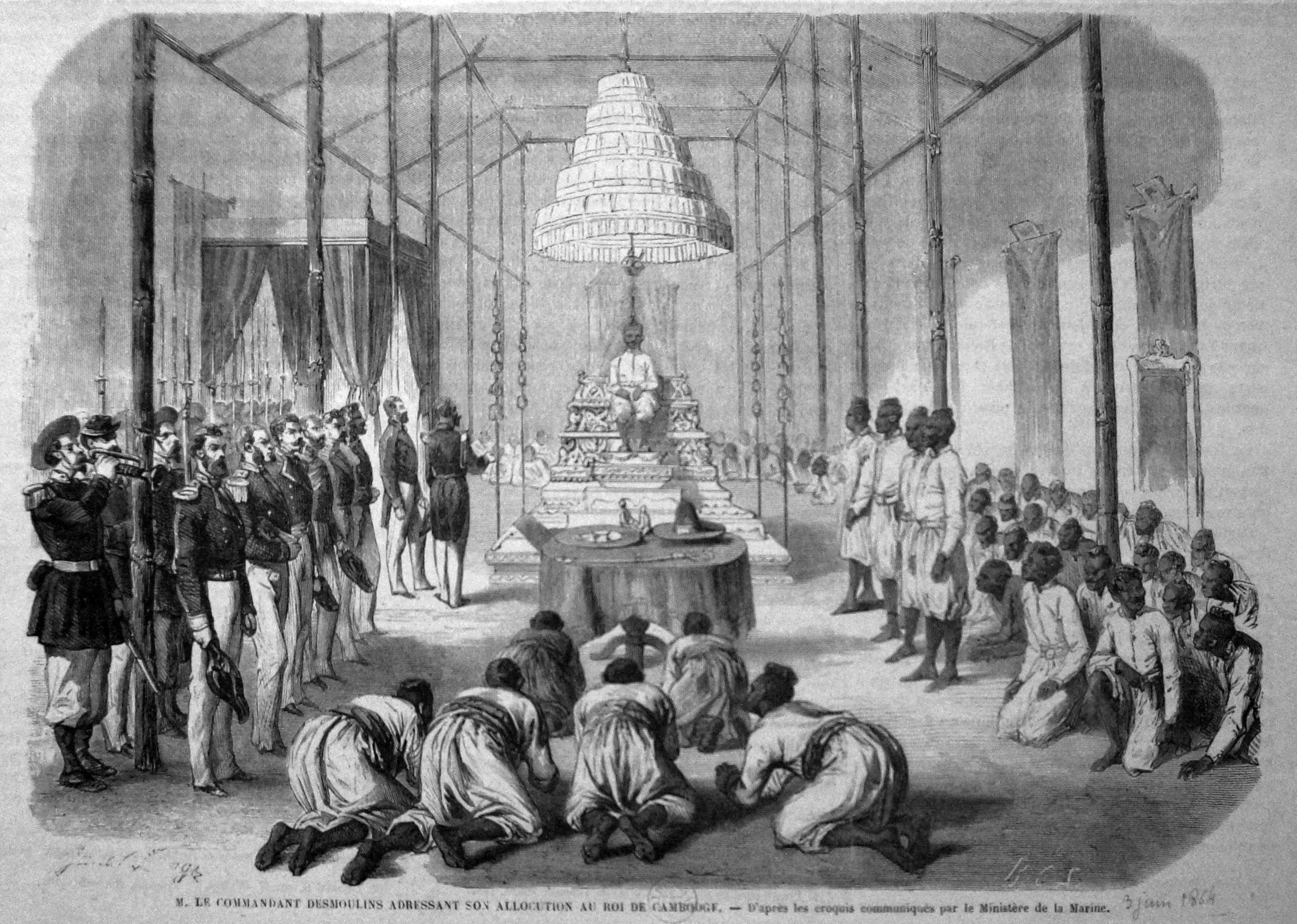
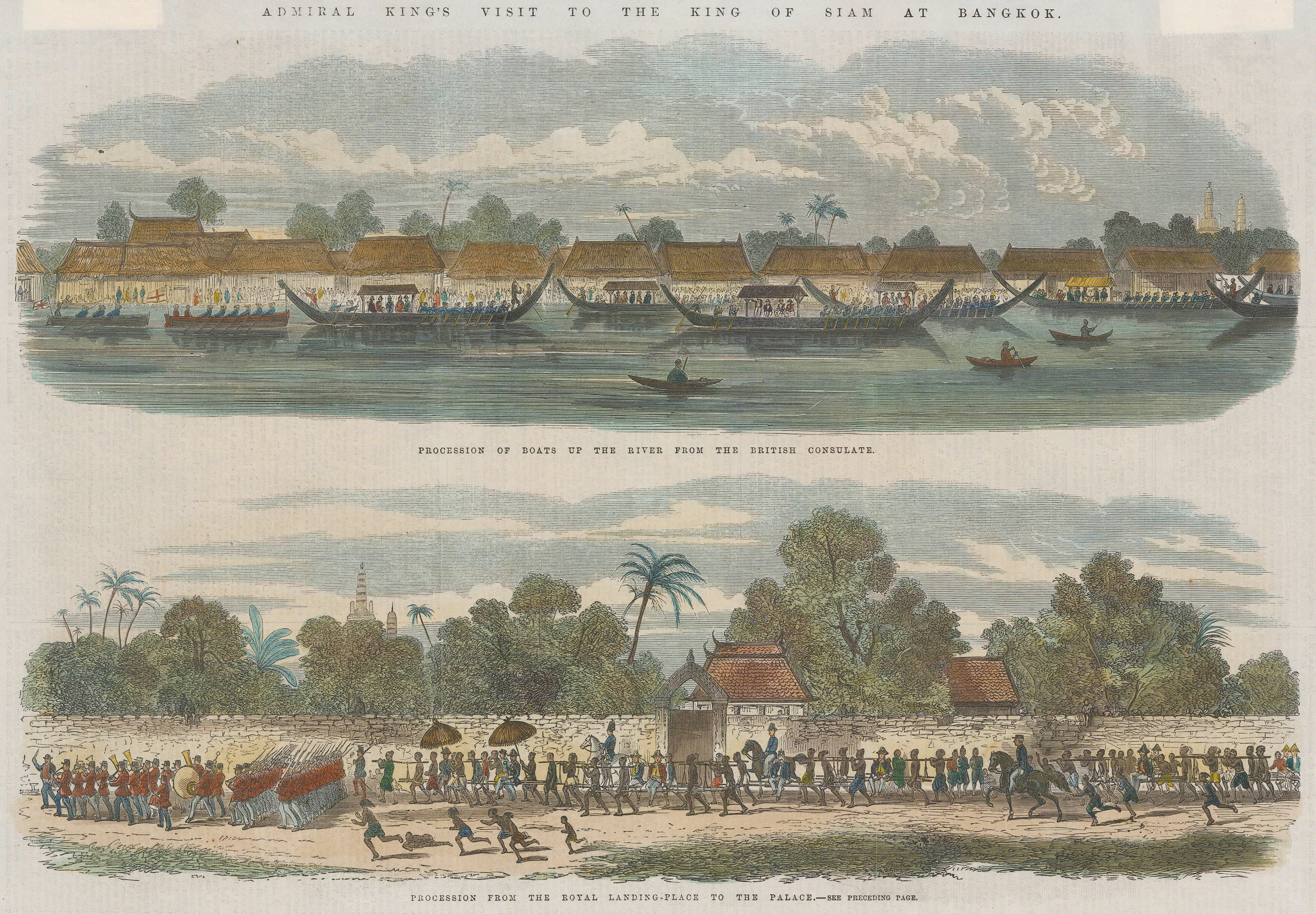
Clockwise: 1. Thai ambassadors to Court of St. James in England 1857. 2. Coronation of King Norodom of Cambodia at Oudong in June 1864 3. British Admiral George King's procession to King Mongkut in Bangkok, 1865

Siam managed to balance itself between European governments and their own colonial administrations. King Mongkut sent Siamese missions to London in 1857 and to Paris in 1861. These missions were the first Siamese missions to Europe after the last one in 1688 during the Ayutthaya period. The Bunnag family dominated the kingdom's foreign affairs. France acquired Cochinchina in 1862. The French were proven to be a hostile new neighbor. King Ang Duong of Cambodia died in 1860, followed by a civil war between his sons Norodom and Si Votha which led to Norodom to seek French assistance. French admiral Pierre-Paul de La Grandière had Norodom sign a treaty that placed Cambodia under French protection in 1863 without Siam's acknowledgement and the French crowned Norodom as King of Cambodia in 1864. Si Suriyawong the Kalahom responded by having Norodom sign another opposing treaty that recognized Siamese suzerainty over Cambodia and had it published in The Straits Times in 1864, much to the embarrassment of Gabriel Aubaret of the French consul. The French sought to annul the opposing treaty as Aubaret brought a gunboat to Bangkok. A Franco-Siamese compromise draft over Cambodian issues was signed in 1865 but ratification was delayed in Paris due to the prospect that France would accept Siamese claims over 'Siamese Laos'. Siam sent another mission to Paris to settle disputes. The treaty was finally ratified in Paris in July 1867, in which Siam officially ceded Cambodia but retained northwestern Cambodia including Battambang and Siem Reap, which would also later be ceded in 1907.

Western imperialism introduced Siam to a new concept of border demarcation and territorial proclamations. In pre-modern Southeast Asia and South Asia, borders between polities were ill-defined, flexible frontier zones rather than precise linear boundaries. The traditional Siamese government only had an authority in cities, towns and agricultural areas; while mountains and forests were largely left alone as they were less important and difficult to reach by authorities. In the era of colonialism, border claims and mapmaking were keys to Siam's standing against colonial encroachments. British and Siamese delegates met at the Tenasserim Hills in 1866 to explore and define Anglo-Siamese borders between Siam and British Burma from the Salween River to the Andaman Sea, thus becoming the modern Myanmar-Thailand border when the treaty was signed in 1868.

==== Regency of Sri Suriwongse ====
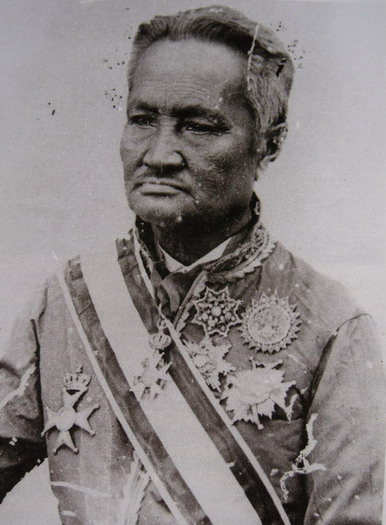
Somdet Chaophraya Sri Suriwongse (Chuang Bunnag) emerged to prominent roles after Bowring Treaty of 1855, became regent of young King Chulalongkorn in 1868, given highest rank of Somdet Chaophraya in 1873, and retained powers until his death in 1883.

When King Mongkut ascended the throne in 1851, he appointed his younger brother Pinklao as Vice-King or Second King of the Front Palace, giving Pinklao immense powers. Vice-King Pinklao predeceased King Mongkut in 1866. After the demise of his peers, Chaophraya Sri Suriwongse emerged as the most powerful nobleman. King Mongkut took a trip to observe a solar eclipse at Prachuap Khiri Khan but contracted malaria and died in October 1868. His 15-year-old son Chulalongkorn was confirmed to succeed the throne under the regency of Sri Suriwongse. The latter unprecedentedly made Wichaichan, son of Pinklao, Vice-King of the Front Palace and heir presumptive without Chulalongkorn's consent. His regency was the time when the power of the Bunnags reached an apex. The young king Chulalongkorn, who had been educated by Anna Leonowens and who was then powerless under the sway of the Bunnag regent, spent his early reign learning and observing. Chulalongkorn visited Singapore and Dutch Java in 1871 and British India in 1872 where he learned about Western colonial administrations, becoming the first Siamese monarch to travel aboard. Chulalongkorn formed the Young Siam Society, composing of liberal Westernizing young princes and noblemen who aimed at state financial reforms and the abolition of government-regulated manpower control for the development of the economy, people and the kingdom, and also to consolidate royal power through centralization.

When King Chulalongkorn reached the age of 20 in 1873, the regency ended as Si Suriyawong was rewarded with the highest rank of Somdet Chaophraya, becoming Somdet Chaophraya Sri Suriwongse. Under the ineffective Chinese tax collector system, King Chulalongkorn found the government treasury to be in debt. He initiated his reforms with the establishment of Ho Ratsadakorn Phiphat (หอรัษฎากรพิพัฒน์) or Auditory Office in June 1873 to centralize and reorganize the taxation system to attain a more stringent revenue collection. Chulalongkorn underwent his second coronation in October 1873 to signify the assumption of the authorities but Si Suriyawong continued to hold de facto power. The king also appointed the Council of State in May 1874, composing of mid-ranking nobles from the Young Siam faction, and the 'Privy Council' in August 1874, composed exclusively of royal princes. Chulalongkorn's fiscal reforms conflicted with the existing benefits of the old nobility and put the king in political conflict with Si Suriyawong, who represented the conservative faction. Chulalongkorn exerted his legislative powers through the Council of State that passed many laws concerning tax reforms. Also in 1874, King Chulalongkorn made his first gradual step towards the abolition of slavery by decreeing that the redemption price of a child slave would continue to decline over age until the age of 21 when they would be freed.

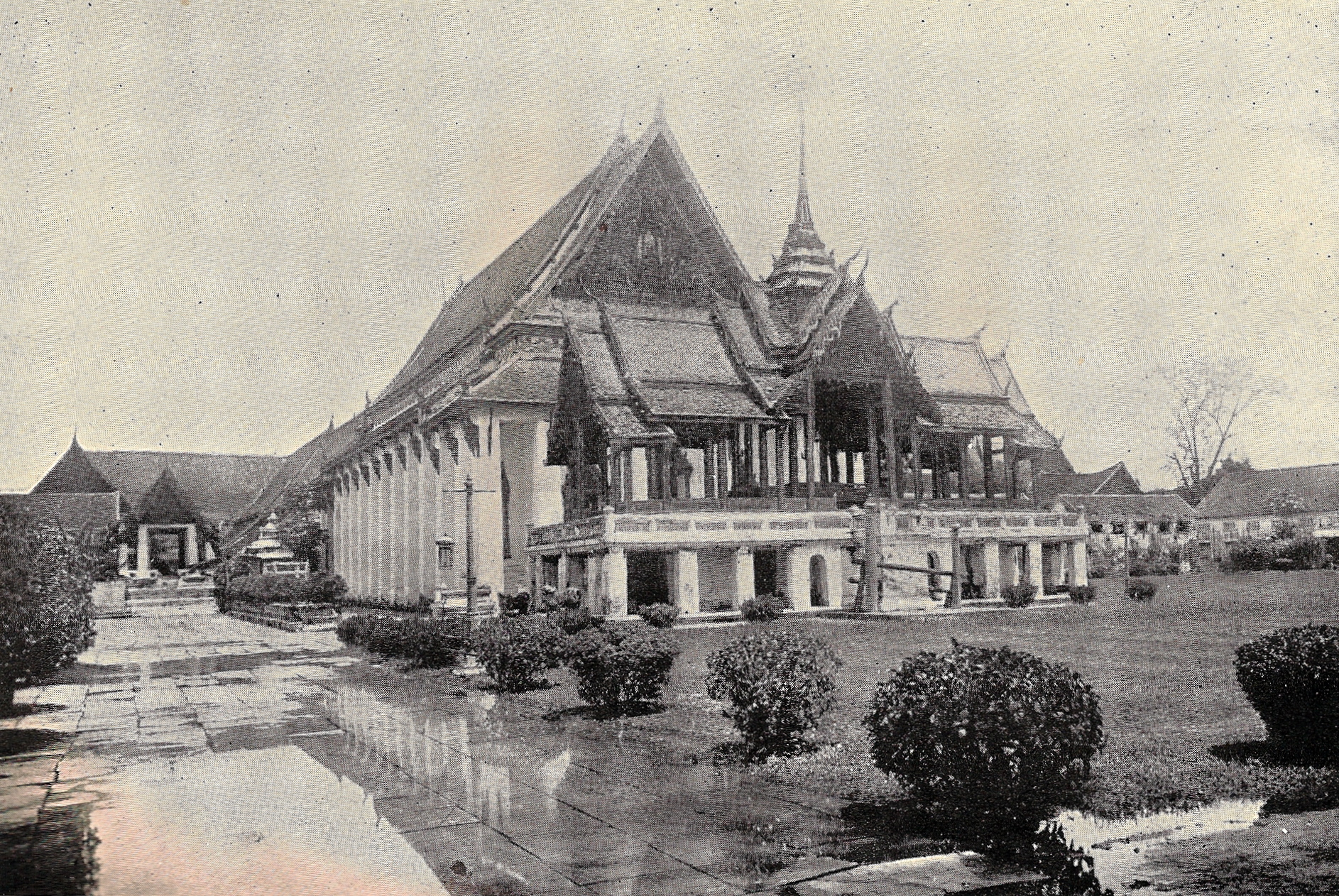
Photograph of the Front Palace c. 1890, now at Bangkok National Museum

Both Chulalongkorn and Sri Suriwongse agreed to abolish corvée labor. However, these reforms upset Prince Wichaichan of the Front Palace who had inherited from his father Pinklao, a huge manpower in service with more than one-thirds of the kingdom's revenue accorded to him, he also had the support of Thomas George Knox the British consul. On one night in December 1874, a fire broke out in the king's royal palace, in which the Front Palace police forces were to enter to help put down fires but they were denied entry by the king's guards for fear that the Front Palace had set up the fire scene to enter the king's quarters. King Chulalongkorn then had his guards surround the Front Palace. This incident was known as the Front Palace Crisis or the Wangna Crisis. Chulalongkorn, in his "swimming to the crocodile" move, asked Si Suriyawong for intervention to placate the situation. Si Suriyawong, however, suggested hard terms on Wichaichan who then fled to take refuge inside the British consulate five days later in January 1875. Siam was on the brink of civil war and foreign intervention with Wichaichan resisting any compromises for he believed the British would give him full support. After many unsuccessful negotiations, Si Suriyawong suggested that the British invited a respectable figure to deal with this situation. Andrew Clarke the governor of the Straits Settlements, who had earlier maintained friendly relations with Chulalongkorn, arrived in Bangkok from Singapore in February 1875 to act as mediator. Clarke was sympathetic to the king's cause and his intervention was fruitful. Wichaichan was forced to accept humiliating terms of giving up his Vice-King position but retaining the Front Palace Office, a reduction of his manpower to 200 men and his virtual grounding inside the Front Palace.

The aftermath of this crisis was a political triumph for Chulalongkorn and the waning of the Bunnag powers as Sri Suriwongse retired to his estate in Ratchaburi. In April 1875, Chulalongkorn created the modern Ministry of Finance that took over control of all revenues. However, the conservative faction won the day as King Chulalongkorn chose to stall further reforms for a decade to prevent political conflicts. The king realized that his old regent still held substantial powers and that he needed more political consolidation for reforms. Only after the death of Sri Suriwongse in 1883 that King Chulalongkorn was able to assume his full powers and implement his reforms. When Prince Wichaichan died in 1885, Chulalongkorn abolished the centuries-old Office of Front Palace altogether in 1886 and appointed his own son Vajirunhis as a Western-style Crown Prince and heir apparent instead.

==== Threats from western powers ====
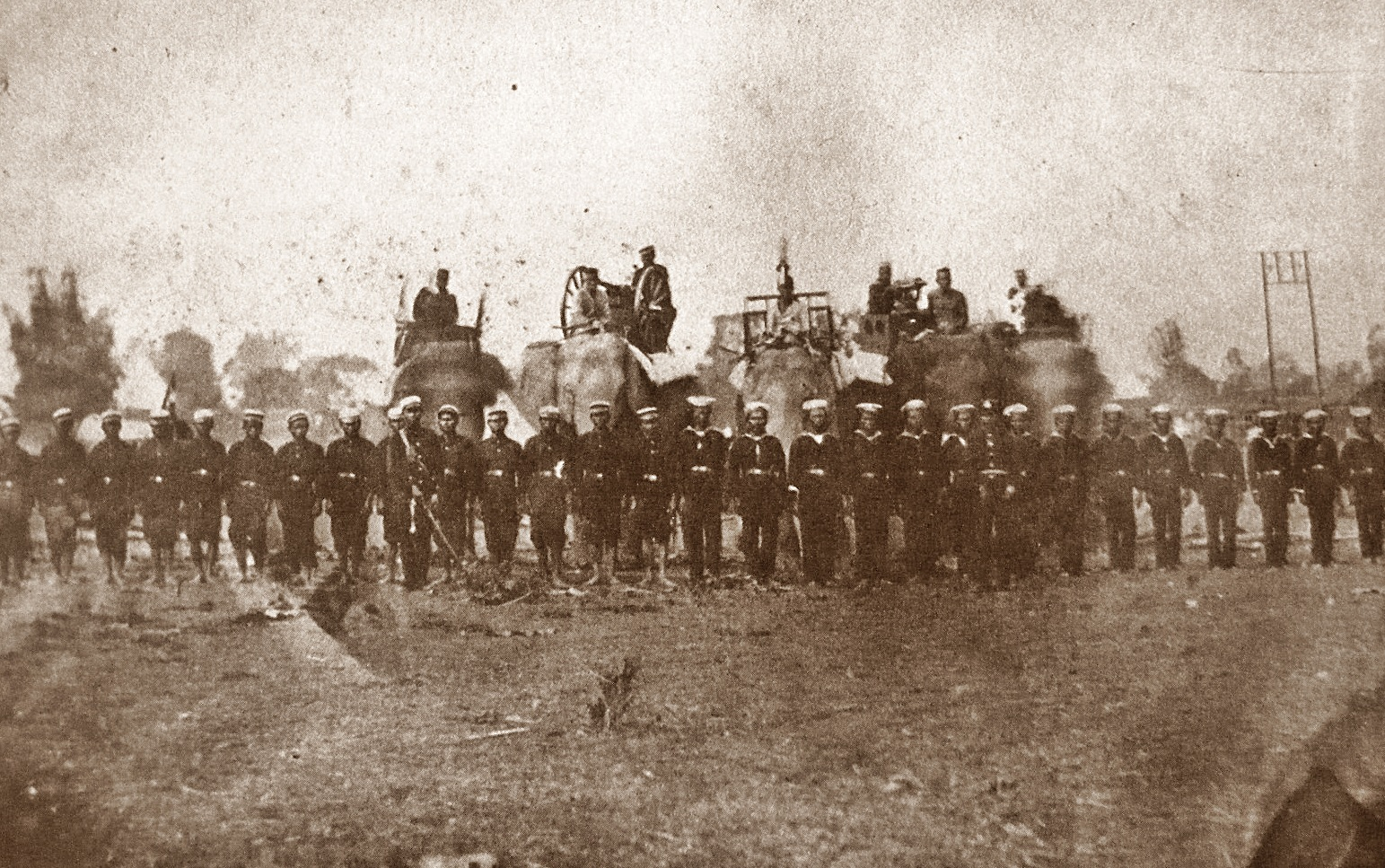
Siamese armies and war elephants during the Haw War of 1875

After the defeat of the Taiping Rebellion in China in 1864, the remaining Chinese dissident forces entered Northern Vietnam in 1868, pillaging and occupying Tai princedoms of Sipsong Chuthai and Houaphanh that would normally send tributes to the Lao Kings of Luang Phrabang. Siamese people called the Chinese who came from the northern highlands as Haw (ฮ่อ) – hence the name Haw Wars. Haw insurgents coalesced into Banner Armies, most notably the Black Flag Army and the Yellow Flag. In 1875, the Yellow Flag Army attacked Muang Phuan, occupied the Plain of Jars and attacked Nongkhai. King Chulalongkorn sent Siamese armies who managed to temporarily drive the Haws into the mountains. The Yellow Flag Army was defeated in 1875 by Chinese authorities and disintegrated into petty groups of bandits but had a resurgence and made their permanent settlement at the Plain of Jars.

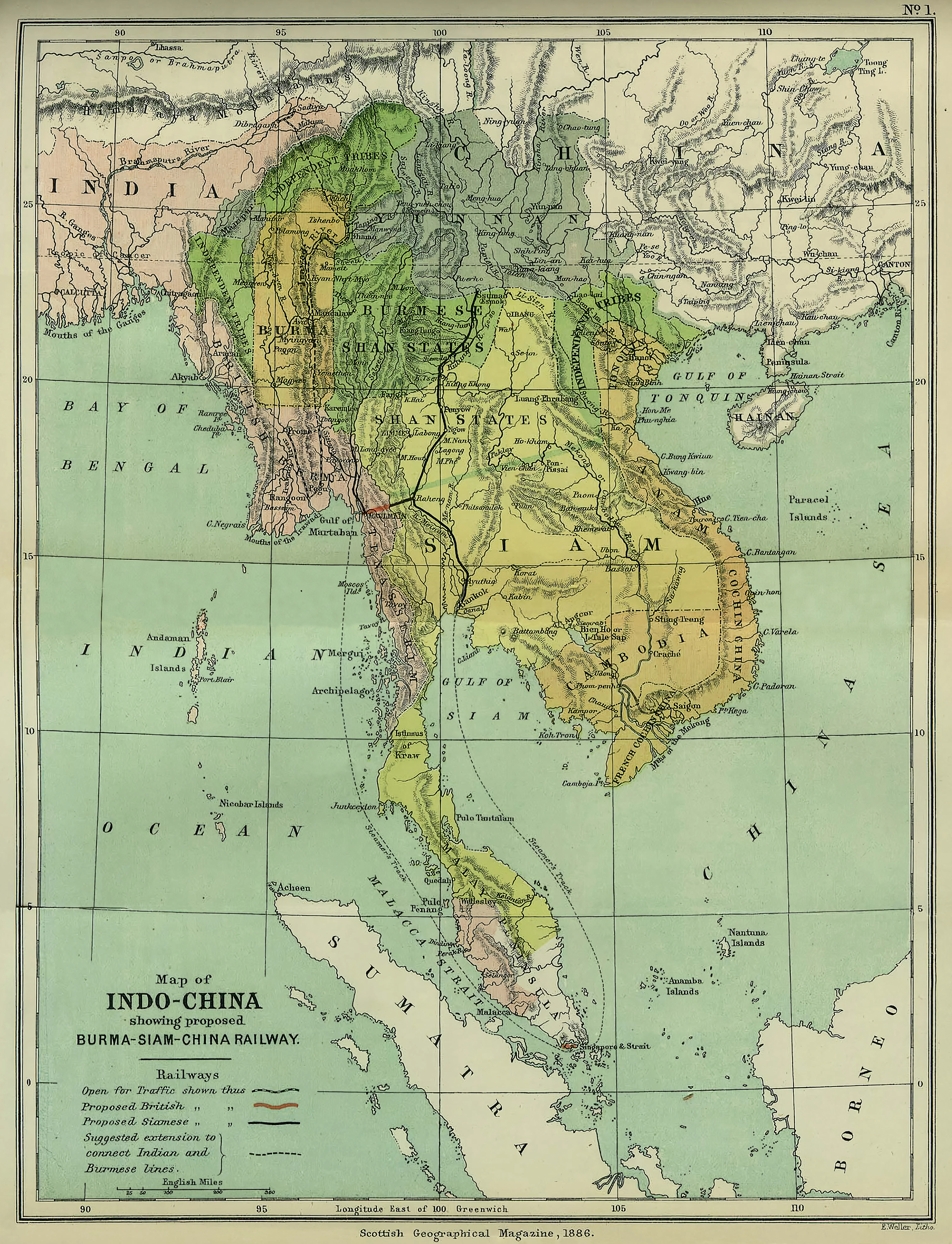
Scottish Geographical Magazine, 1886

W. & A.K. Johnston from McCarthy's surveys, 1900

Prior to the 1880s, local polities in Southeast Asia did not have fixed territorial borders. Early Western maps showed approximations of the spheres of influence. Siam's boundaries were first demarcated according to western methods following surveys headed by James McCarthy in the 1880s–90s.

In pre-modern Southeast Asia, traditional polities did not have fixed demarcated borders. Rather, the polities had territorial spheres defined by cultural and political influence and geographic features. The spheres of influence were based on a network and a hierarchy of alliances and tributary obligations according to the mandala system. The multicultural Siamese empire had a number of tributary states including Lanna Chiangmai, the Lao Kingdoms of Luang Phrabang and Champasak, minor Lao-Lanna chiefdoms and Muslim Malay sultanates in the south. However, colonial encroachment by the British Empire and French Indochina caused the territories and sovereignty to be clearly defined according to western style fixed borders. The British acquired Upper Burma and the French acquired Tonkin in 1886. This development escalated imperialist designs on Siam and led to increased Western presence in the northern Siamese hinterlands. Siam responded to imperialist threats with centralization and internal restructuring that integrated tributary states into Siam proper, ending their autonomies. Lanna lords had benefitted from their traditional ownership of the vast northern teak forests and their sometimes-conflicting forestry patents granted to British loggers might provoke British intervention. Lanna was the first target of reforms as it stood at the frontline of a possible British incursion. Anglo-Siamese Treaty of Chiangmai in 1883 urged Bangkok to tighten its control over Lanna. King Chulalongkorn sent a royal commissioner to Chiang Mai in 1883 to initiate reforms. Central-Siamese-style governance and stringent taxation were imposed. Reforms were promising at first but gradually dwindled away due to the persistence of Lanna rulers, whose traditional privileges and powers were compromised by the reforms.

King Chulalongkorn sent another Siamese expedition to subjugate the Haws at the Plain of Jars in 1884–1885 but the campaign was disastrous. The Siamese court then took a more serious approach on the Chinese insurgents. Freshly modernized Siamese regiments were sent to suppress the Haws and to take control of the frontier in 1885. Chaomuen Waiworanat (later Chaophraya Surasak Montri) took a commanding position at Muang Xon to pacify Houaphanh and then proceed to Muang Thaeng in Sipsong Chuthai. However, Siamese forces faced resistance from Đèo Văn Trị, son of Đèo Văn Sinh the White Tai ruler of Muang Lay, who was closely allied with the Black Flags. These events coincided with the arrival of Auguste Pavie, a French colonialist advocate, in February 1887 to assume the position of the French consul in Luang Phrabang. Unable to go further, Waiworanat ended his campaign in April 1887, taking Haw and Tai captives, among them the brothers of Đèo Văn Trị to Bangkok. The enraged Đèo Văn Trị led the Black Flag Army to seize and plunder Luang Phrabang in June 1887. Auguste Pavie rescued King Ounkham of Luang Phrabang and took him on a canoe to Bangkok. The French took this opportunity to enter and occupy Sipsong Chuthai, which Siam had attempted to claim. After arguments between Surasak Montri and Pavie, it was agreed in 1888 that French Indochina received Sipsong Chuthai while Siam retained Houaphanh.

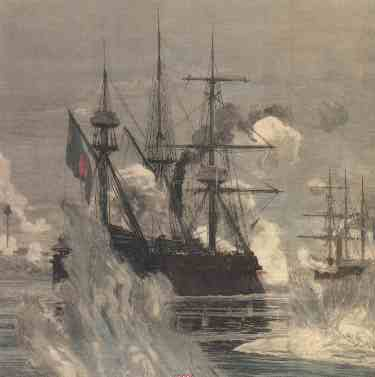
French gunboats Inconstant and Comète under fire from Siamese Chulachomklao Fort in Paknam incident on 13 July 1893

Siamese territorial lost after the Paknam incident

Franco-Siamese relations deteriorated after the French seizure of Sipsong Chuthai in 1887. Auguste Pavie, who had been transferred to become French consul in Bangkok, brought the gunboat Lutin to Bangkok in March 1893 and pressed the Siamese government to relinquish all Lao lands on the left (east) bank of the Mekong River. When Siam did not comply, the French advanced their forces into Laos, resulting in the killing of French officer Grosgurin at the hands of Phra Yot Mueang Khwang (พระยอดเมืองขวาง) the Siamese governor of Khammouan in June 1893. The French parliament in Paris, dominated by colonialist sentiments, ordered strong military retaliation on Siam. Two more French gunboats, Inconstant and Comète, entered the Chao Phraya River, forcing its way up to Bangkok to threaten the Siamese royal palace as gunfire was exchanged between French gunboats and the Siamese Chulachomklao Fort during the Paknam Incident. Prince Devawongse the Minister of Foreign Affairs went to 'congratulate' the French invaders but Pavie presented an ultimatum, urging Siam to cede lands east of the Mekong, to pay an indemnity of three million francs and to punish Phra Yot Mueang Khwang. As Siam hesitated, the French imposed a naval blockade on Bangkok. The Siamese court hoped to find British support against French aggression but the British were unresponsive so Siam resolved to comply unconditionally to French demands in July 1893. French gunboats left Bangkok in August 1893 but proceeded to occupy Chanthaburi on Siam's eastern coast to assure their compliance. The treaty was signed in October 1893. Laos, which had been under Siamese rule for about a century since 1779, joined French Indochina in 1893. The Franco–Siamese War of 1893 or Crisis of Year 112 (วิกฤตการณ์ ร.ศ. ๑๑๒) was the time when Siam came closest to being conquered by a Western imperialist power.

==== Reforms of Chulalongkorn ====
After the demise of Somdet Chaophraya Sri Suriwongse in 1883, King Chulalongkorn was in control of the government by the mid-1880s and was able to implement reforms. After decades of domination by powerful nobility, Chulalongkorn brought many royal princes – his brothers and sons – to government roles. The princes received modernized education and formed an educated elite. The king began to send his sons for European education in 1885. Many princes were specialized in their responsible fields. Most notable ones were Prince Devawongse who specialized in foreign affairs and Prince Damrong in internal affairs. Following the European model, by the suggestion of Prince Devawongse, King Chulalongkorn began to form modern ministries in 1888 to the replace centuries-old disorganized Chatusadom central governance. In April 1892, the first modern Siamese cabinet was formed, consisting mostly of royal princes. Prince Damrong became Mahatthai Minister of Interior in 1892. Damrong introduced a modern bureaucracy and, in 1893, announced the establishment of the Monthon system that replaced the traditional tributary network of semi-independent rulers with numerous levels of territory-based administrative units with a centrally appointed commissioner in charge.

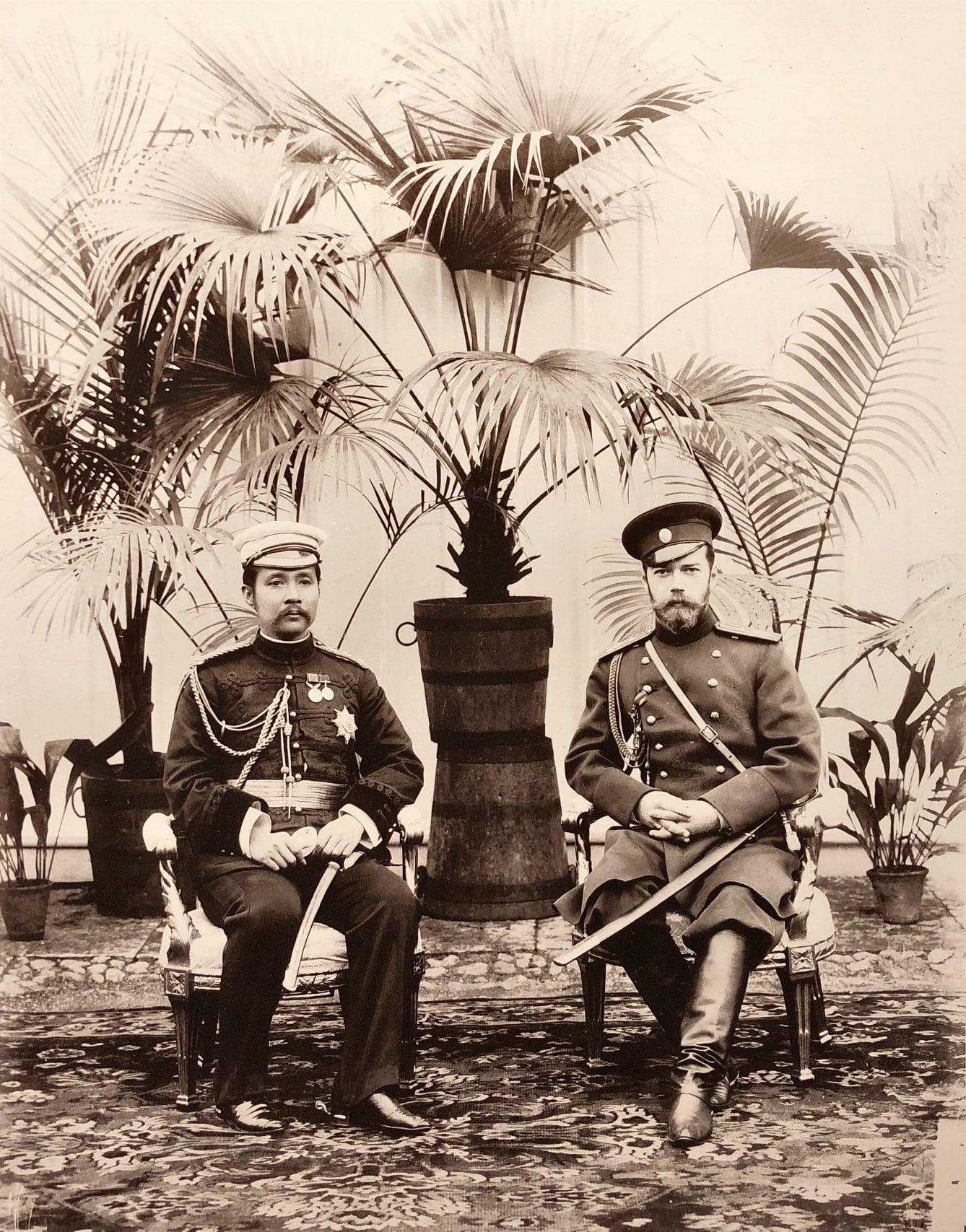
King Chulalongkorn with Tsar Nicholas II of Russia in Saint Petersburg on his Grand European Tour in 1897

Amidst these reforms, however, the French sent gunboats to threaten Bangkok in 1893, prompting Siam to cede all of Laos east of the Mekong to French Indochina. The treaty terms of October 1893 also established a 25-km demilitarized zone along the Mekong but only on the Siamese side. The major fear of the Siamese court came true when the French invaded in 1893, as the survival of Siam's sovereignty was left at the mercy of Anglo-French conflicts. As the British expressed their concerns over French advances on Siam, the Anglo-French agreement of 1896 guaranteed Siam's independence as a "buffer state" only in Siam's core territories, allowing British intervention in Southern Siam and French intervention in Eastern Siam. King Chulalongkorn embarked on his Grand European Tour in 1897, with Queen Saovabha as regent during royal absence, to promote the image of his kingdom as civilized and Westernized not a candidate for colonization. Meanwhile, French exertion of authority over its 'French Asian subjects' in Siam, namely the Lao, Cambodian and Vietnamese, led to protracted unsettled negotiations and continuing French occupation of Chanthaburi.

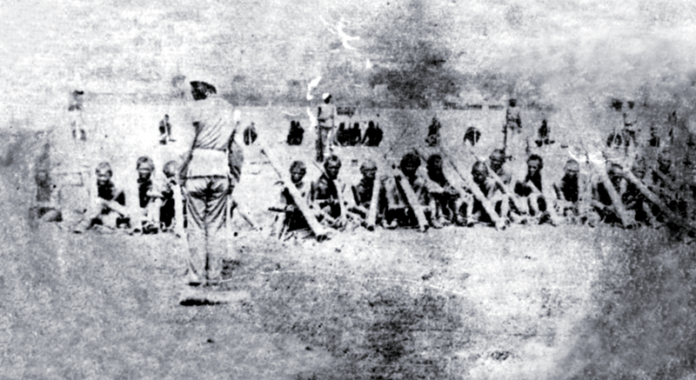
Captured convicts of holy man rebels at Ubon Ratchathani in 1901

After 1893, several Siamese reforms accelerated. Gustave Rolin-Jaequemyns, the king's Belgian advisor, convinced the Siamese government that contravention of Siam's sovereignty by Western powers was due to the fact that Siamese law and its legal system, dated to Ayutthaya times, were antiquated and not yet modernized. King Chulalongkorn appointed the Legislative Council in 1897, composing of Western legal specialists, to create a modern Siamese law based on the civil law system. Monthons continued to form, ending the powers of the old local lords. Integration of Lanna began in 1893 and it became a fully-fledged Monthon, Monthon Phayap, in 1899. The remaining Lao towns in Khorat Plateau west of the Mekong were organized into four Monthons. The Provincial Administration Act of 1897 defined the structure of the Monthon system. However, the centralization policies were not without resistance. Numerous tribal leaders in Isan who claimed supernatural powers arose during the Holy Man's Rebellion in 1901–1902. Sultan Abdul Kadir, the last raja of Pattani, sought British support from Singapore and planned an insurgency but was caught beforehand as seven Pattani Malay sultanates were integrated into Siam in 1902. The Shan immigrants in Phrae arose in the Shan Rebellion of Phrae in 1902, declaring for Lanna traditions to be upheld and for the killing of Central Siamese officials. Chaophraya Surasak Montri however managed to put down the Shan Rebellion in 1902. In April 1905, King Chulalongkorn outright abolished slavery. Also in 1905, Chulalongkorn replaced the traditional corvée labor system with a modern universal conscription system through the Military Conscription Act of August 1905 with recruits serving for a limited time. The first modern Siamese law, the Penal Code, was promulgated in 1908. Compilation of modern Siamese law would take nearly four decades, only to be finished in 1935.

Spheres of influence abandoned by Siam to Western powers from 1785 to 1909, shown as a map of territorial losses

The influence of the Colonial Party in Paris pressed for more Siamese concessions during the negotiations, in which Prince Devawongse was the Siamese representative. In 1904, Siam had to cede Mluprey, Champasak and Sainyabuli on the right (west) bank to France in return for French abandonment of Chanthaburi but the French proceeded to hold Trat instead. The Anglo-French Entente Cordiale in 1904 confirmed mutual recognition of Siamese independence by both powers. In 1907, French and Siamese delegates met to demarcate Franco-Siamese borders and it was decided that France returned Trat and Dansai to Siam in exchange for northwestern Cambodia including Battambang and Siemreap, which were ceded to French Indochina and the French also agreed to curtail exertion of jurisdiction over French Asian subjects in Siam, in the Franco–Siamese Treaty of 1907. Lastly, Siam decided to relinquish the Northern Malay sultanates including Kedah, Kelantan, Terengganu and Perlis to British Malaya in the Anglo-Siamese Treaty of 1909 in exchange for British loan of four million pounds to Siam for construction of Southern Siamese railway and for British surrender of most extraterritorial jurisdiction in Siam. These lost territories were on the fringes of the Siamese sphere of influence, which Siam had only exerted some degree of control, the concept of the "lost territories" was not created until after the Siamese revolution of 1932 by Thai military nationalists. Through his long reign, Chulalongkorn implemented government, fiscal and social reforms and shed Siamese tributary periphery, transforming Siam from traditional mandala network polity into more-compact modern nation-state with centralized bureaucracy and clearly defined boundaries, bordering British Burma in the west, French Indochina in the east and British Malaya to the south.

=== Late modern Siam (1910–1932) ===
==== Liberalism and early movements towards constitution ====
A group of Siamese princes, ambassadors and officials working as diplomats in Europe, led by Prince Prisdang, laid a petition to King Chulalongkorn in January 1885, urging the king to endorse Western-style constitutional monarchy in the event known as Incident of Year 103 (เหตุการณ์ ร.ศ. ๑๐๓). Chulalongkorn responded to this petition, saying that the kingdom needed reforms first. Chulalongkorn created modern Siamese absolute monarchy, in which the king, as an enlightened monarch, with a Europeanized kingship, exerted unlimited royal powers through a centralized bureaucracy. His reign also saw the emergence of commoner liberal figures, who had been imprisoned for their ideologies, including K.S.R. Kulap who coined the Siamese term Prachathippatai (Sanskrit prajā "people" and Pali ādhipateyya "sovereignty") for "democracy" in 1894 and Thianwan who radically proposed for representative government and a parliament to limit royal powers in 1905. Thianwan also advocated for monogamy and women's rights against predominantly polygamic patriarchal Siamese traditional society of his time. Siamese visionaries took Meiji Japan as the model for self-motivated Asian modernization success. King Chulalongkorn was officially eulogized as "Phra Piya Maharaj" (พระปิยมหาราช, "Great Beloved King") in 1907.

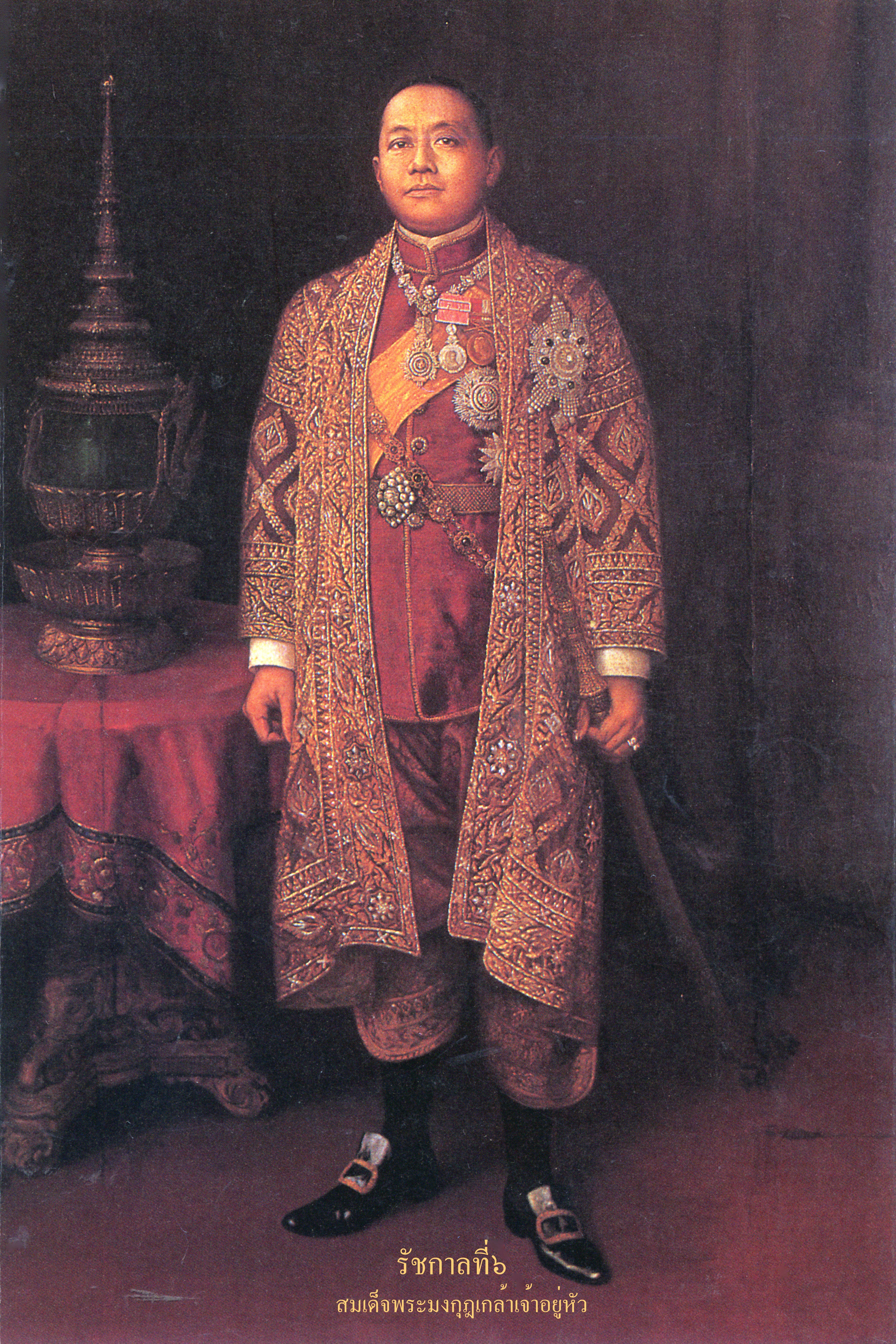
King Vajiravudh (Rama VI) (r. 1910–1925), supported nationalism and modernization

Crown Prince Vajirunhis the designated heir died prematurely in 1895. Chulalongkorn then made his other son Vajiravudh, who had been staying at Ascot, Berkshire, the new Crown Prince. Vajiravudh went to train at Sandhurst Military in 1896 and studied history and law at Oxford in 1900, only returning to Siam in 1903. King Chulalongkorn made a promise that his son and successor Vajiravudh would consent to a constitution. Chulalongkorn embarked on another European tour in 1907 to seek cure for his illness, with Crown Prince Vajiravudh as the regent during his absence. King Chulalongkorn died in October 1910. His son Vajiravudh ascended as new king Rama VI as the first Siamese king to be educated abroad. Western colonialist threats were technically over and Siam faced new challenges – movements towards constitutional monarchy and democracy.

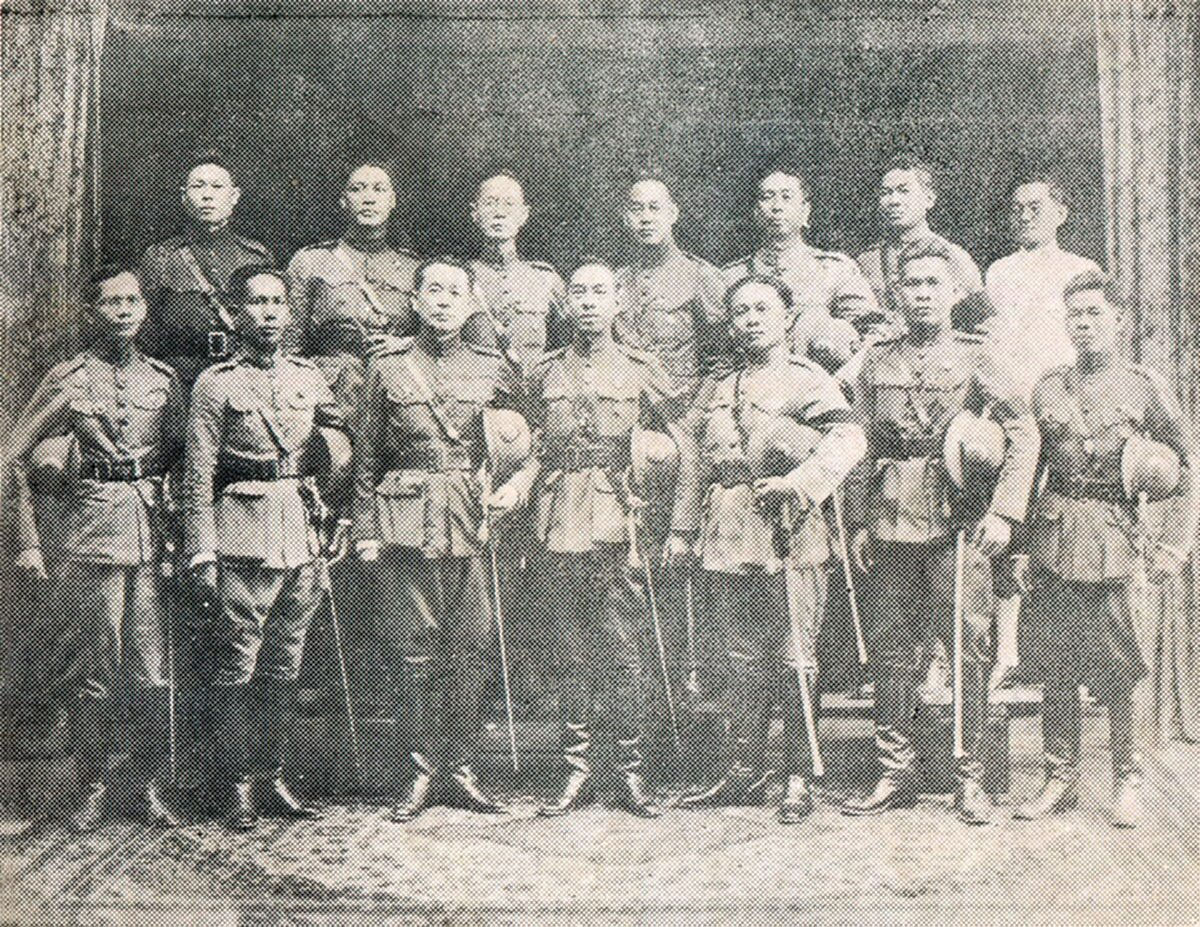
Conspirators of the Palace Revolt of 1912, which was aborted by leakage of the plot.

The Xinhai Revolution in 1911 overthrew the Chinese imperial Qing dynasty and left Siam as one of the few functioning absolute monarchies in Asia. The British-educated new king Vajiravudh was an Edwardian gentleman. Vajiravudh created Suea Pa or Wild Tiger Corps in May 1911 as paramilitary force under his direct control. This alienated Vajiravudh from a group of mid-ranking military personnel who were offended by corporeal punishment of a military officer on Vajiravudh's orders some years prior. This group of junior military officers conspired the Palace Revolt of 1912 or Rebellion of Year 130 (กบฏ ร.ศ. ๑๓๐) in January 1912 in an attempt to overthrow the absolute monarchy. However, the plot leaked and the conspirators were apprehended in April 1912. Understanding the context of liberal trends, Vajiravudh spared the conspirators from death sentences but gave prison terms only to top leaders of this abortive plot. Siamese government associated this rebellion with Chinese republican movement. The paramilitary movement largely disappeared by 1927, but was revived and evolved into the Volunteer Defense Corps, alternatively called the Village Scouts. (Thai: ลูกเสือบ้าน) The junior branch of Suea Pa or the Tiger Corps survived in modern Thailand as National Scout Organization.

Administrative map of Siam in 1916, showing rearrangement of provincial monthon divisions.

Unlike his father Chulalongkorn, who filled the cabinet with senior royal princes, Vajiravudh preferred his personal favorites, who were mostly princes of younger generation. Initially, Vajiravudh's government was dominated by senior princes from his father's reign. With resignation of Prince Damrong from government in 1915 due to friction with the new king, Siamese administration took an overturn. Chaophraya Yommaraj Pan Sukhum replaced Prince Damrong as the king's most competent administrator. By 1915, the royal cabinet shifted from being dominated by senior princes to being filled with the king's inner circles. Peripheral Monthon provinces were rearranged and reorganized into larger Phaks or regions, each with Uparat or viceroy as superintendents. The king's favoritism allowed ordinary men of non-royal backgrounds, who were allowed more education and opportunities, to rise up the government through connections with the king.

Vajiravudh was a relatively liberal monarch as he allowed the public press to have opinions on him. During his reign, newspapers and magazines, in Siamese, English and Chinese languages, proliferated to discuss political ideologies of the time. Vajiravudh's reign was the age of popular press and saw the advent of Thai political journalism. Newspapers were direct and contemptuous towards government against the absolute order, including the king himself, gaining readerships from all classes of society including women. Vajiravudh personally participated in these political discussions under literary pseudonyms. His reign was also an affluent period of modern Thai literature, in which the king translated many Western works and explored novel abstract ideas through creation of modern vocabularies using Pali and Sanskrit lexicons. The king himself was an author and theatrical actor. Vajiravudh experimented democracy with a mock-democracy miniature town called Dusit Thani, founded in July 1918, as a city with a constitution, mock election and model parliament and as a theatrical play. It was the time of press freedom compared to later periods of Thai history. After the Siam Electric tramline worker strike in 1922, the first labor struggle in Thai history, Vajiravudh decided to curb press freedom and restore order through his Publication Act of January 1923, making editors liable to lèse-majesté criminal offense. Vajiravudh's reign was relatively liberal and creative yet restrictive to any realistic profound changes. Still, King Vajiravudh was committed to absolute monarchy and denied Western liberal ideologies on the grounds that Siam had its own unique traditional principles based on Buddhism.

==== Nationalism and World War I ====
During WWI, King Rama VI decreed two changes to the Siamese national flag in 1916–1917, first to a red background to a five-stripe design of red and white for civil usage and then to the red, white, and blue national ensign in use today, taking inspiration from Allied flags.

In his speech to the Wild Tiger Corps, King Vajiravudh instituted the sacred inseparable trinity of Chat (Nation), Satsana (Buddhist Religion), and Phra Maha Kasat (Monarchy), which were the essence of Siamese nation, from British God, King, and Country. King Vajiravudh invented Thai elite nationalism that emphasized Siamese unified national identity under traditional social hierarchy. Seow Hutseng (蕭佛成), head of Siamese branch of Kuomintang, edited Chinosayam Warasap ("Sino–Siamese magazine") publications to propagate republican revolutionary ideas among the Chinese in Siam, who had numbered to 8.3 million people. The king adopted anti-Chinese stance and referred to them as the 'Jews of the East'. Chinese immigrants became ready targets of Siamese economic nationalism. In 1913, Vajiravudh introduced surname system and defined Thai nationality by blood in response to Chinese citizenship claims. Vajiravudh founded Chulalongkorn University, the first modern Siamese university, in honor of his father, in 1916. Vajiravudh also instituted compulsory modern education in Central Thai language nation-wide, including the Muslim Malay South, in primary level for all genders through his Primary Education Act of 1921.

Integration of former tributary polities continued. In Northern Siam, Khruba Siwichai, a popular Lanna monk, led a passive resistance in the 1910s against integration of Lanna monastic order into Central Siamese State Buddhism. Trainlines from Bangkok reached Pattani in 1919 and Chiang Mai in 1922. With creation of Monthon Pattani in 1905, the Pattani Malays of Muslim South were exempted from military conscription and most taxes. However, nationalistic education reforms affected Islamic Malay education in Pattani. Combined with dissatisfaction over the capitation tax, the rural Pattani Malays planned the Namsai uprising of 1922 but were again intercepted beforehand. Siamese government responded with Six Principles for Governance of Pattani Province in June 1923, proposed by Yommaraj Pan Sukhum, which pressed careful handling of Muslim South region through lenient tax measures and respect of the Islamic religion.

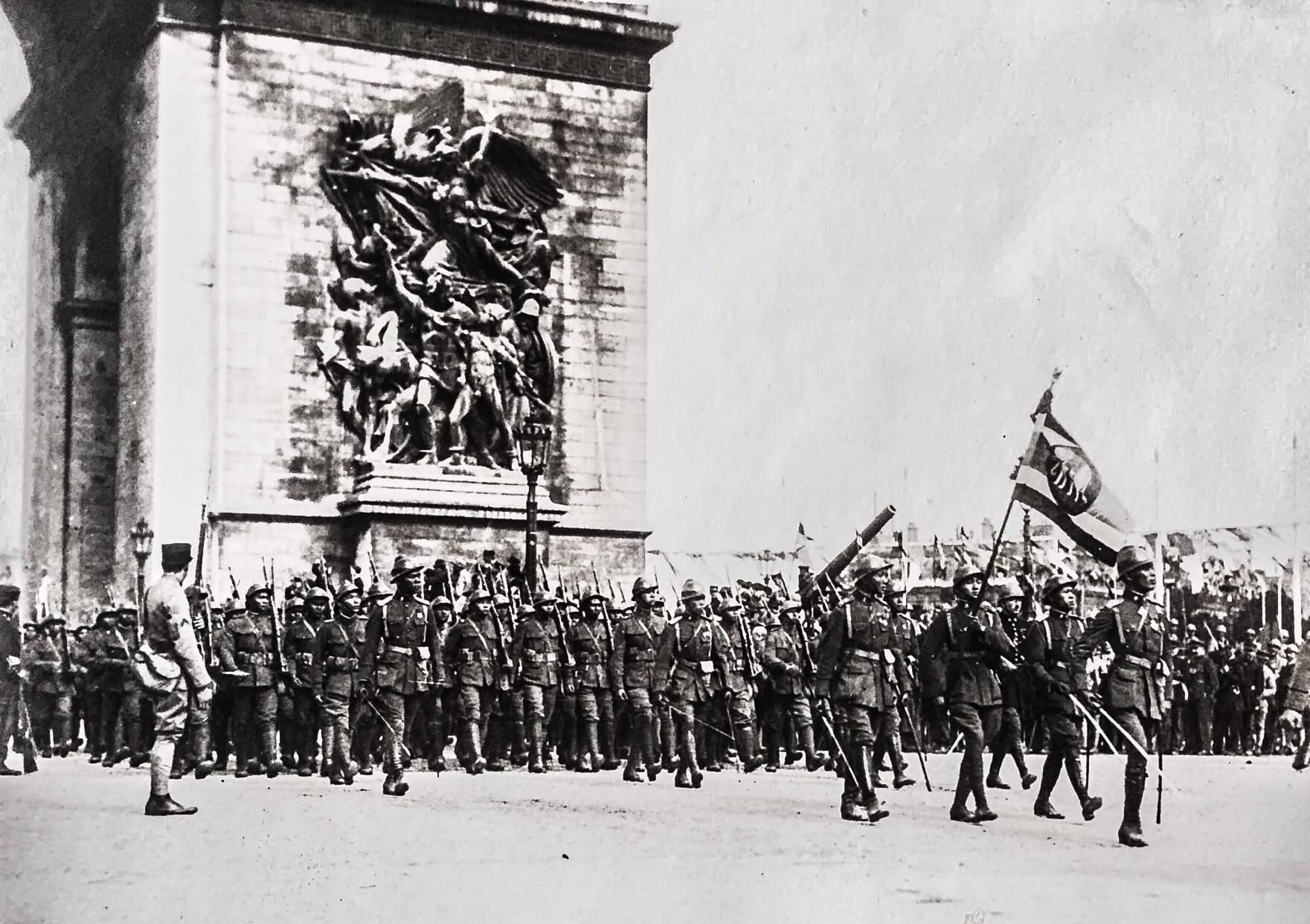
The Siamese Expeditionary Forces during World War I in Paris, July 1919

Vajiravudh initially declared neutrality for Siam during early stages of World War I in 1914, even though the king was pro-Allies due to his British educational background. Vajiravudh soon realized that staying in neutrality would deprive Siam of its due concessions. Vajiravudh eventually led Siam to declare war on Central Powers in July 1917, following the American entry into the war. Vajiravudh dispatched Siamese Expeditionary Forces of 1,284 volunteer men, under command of Phraya Phichaicharnrit, to join the Western front of World War I. To go to war, Siam required a modern flag. The elephant flag was difficult to print so Vajiravudh adopted the tricolor flag in September 1917 with its colors reflecting the state trinity. For the first time, Siam, as a nation, participated in military conflict of world stage by sending its army on the French steamship SS Empire and also sending flying air force squadron to France in June 1918. Siam had already established its own air force and had been training Siamese aviators since 1913. Siamese forces arrived in Europe at Marseilles in July 1918 just in time for the Allied occupation of Rhineland with the Siamese forces themselves participating in during 1918–1919. Siamese forces joined the victory parade at Paris in July 1919. Siam's entry into the Allies side secured Siam a place in Versailles Peace Conference in 1919, becoming a founding member of the League of Nations in 1920.

Through its proud participation in the World War I, Siam pushed for abrogation of the 'unequal treaties' with Western powers, previously made during the mid-nineteenth century that granted extraterritorial jurisdiction and low tariff imposition onto Westerners. These concessions had been compromising Siam's national sovereignty. American–Siamese Treaty of 1920 and Japan–Siam Treaty of 1924 served as prototypes for other renewed treaties with Western nations. King Vajiravudh commissioned Phraya Kanlayana Maitri Francis Bowes Sayre, a Harvard Law professor, as the delegate of Siam to re-negotiate treaties with European nations on his European tour of 1924–1926. France and United Kingdom consented to new treaties with Siam in 1925. Extraterritorial rights of foreigners in Siam and restriction of tariff imposition on imported goods were abolished, restoring Siam's judiciary and fiscal autonomy.

==== Rise of the middle class and financial crisis ====
Siamese royal government began to send non-royal men for European education in 1897, through Thai king's scholarship, mainly to accompany the royal princes in their studies and to produce native officials to work in modernized Siamese government. This led to the formation of the Siamese educated middle class, consisting of the former lower nobility class and the assimilated Chinese immigrants. These new middle-class people were exposed to modern education and the Western ideas of civilization and progress.

King Vajiravudh spent a great amount of money on his many projects and personal expenditures, totaling nine million baht (45 billion adjusted for inflation) accounting for about ten percent of annual state budget. Siam's expanding bureaucracy and modernization required a great amount of public spending. Participation in World War I was also expensive and the post-war economic downturn took a great toll on Siamese economy. Vajiravudh's profligacy has been cited in most historiographies as the root of Siam's subsequent financial crisis but Siam's fragile economy itself also played the part. Siam did not undergo industrialization due to lack of technological progress and remained an export-oriented agrarian economy. Fluctuating global rice commodity price, Siam's main export, in the 1920s, was combined with crop failures during 1919–1921 to worsen the situation. After 1919, Siam's trade balance and state budget were in great deficit, with great amount of silver flowing out of the kingdom, destabilizing the baht currency.

Vajiravudh was unmarried for most of his reign until 1920 when he betrothed himself to a candidate and took three consorts during 1921–1922. In 1924, King Vajiravudh enacted modern Siamese royal succession law, giving precedence to the lineages of Vajiravudh's true brothers who shared the same mother Queen Saovabha, followed by the princes who were born to Chulalongkorn's two other main queens. Vajiravudh's fifth consort gave birth to a daughter two days before his death in November 1925, without leaving any male heirs. Prince Paribatra of Nakhon Sawan was the eldest surviving brother of Vajiravudh of the celestial Chaofa rank but he was Vajiravudh's half-brother, having a different mother. Per Vajiravudh's 1924 succession law, the Siamese throne would go to Vajiravudh's 32-year-old younger brother Prince Prajadhipok of Sukhothai.

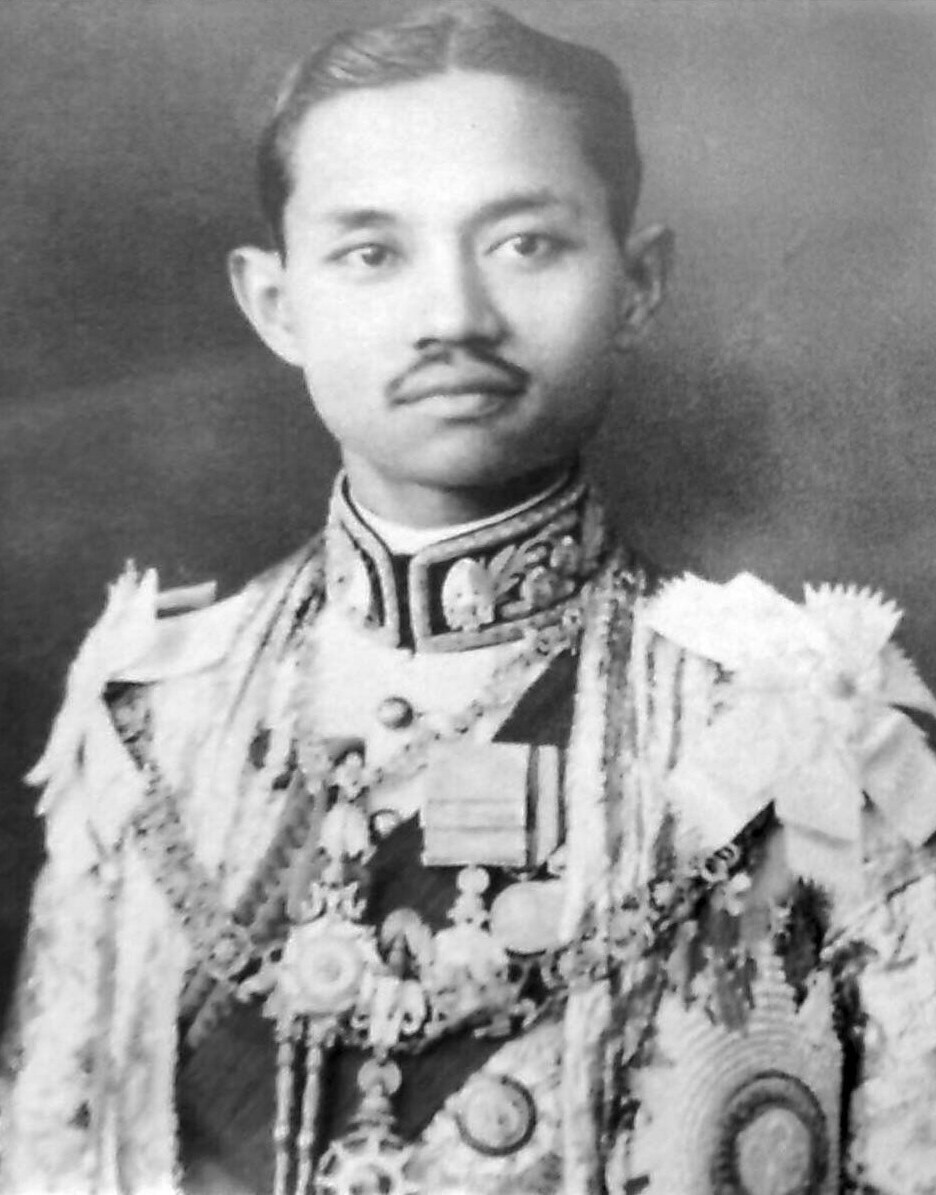
King Prajadhipok (Rama VII) (r. 1925–1935) was the last absolute monarch of Siam.

Prajadhipok had just returned from his military education in France and the United Kingdom when he learned of his unexpected succession to the royal throne in 1925. Prajadhipok was unprepared and openly stated his lack of experiences in government, requesting assistances from senior figures. This led to the creation of Abhiradhamontri Sabha (อภิรัฐมนตรีสภา) or the Supreme Council of State, consisting of five senior royal princes including Prince Paribatra who had been in control of military and Prince Damrong who resumed his roles in government. This Council of State assisted Prajadhipok in government but also sidelined the king's active roles. Royal princes returned to the government, reminiscing of the days of King Chulalongkorn, after the days of King Vajiravudh favoring his personal choices as Vajiravudh's personnel were gradually replaced by members of the royal family in the cabinet of the new reign.

As the conservative princely faction retook power, the immediate concern of the royal government was to address the ongoing state fiscal problems, inherited from Vajiravudh's reign, through austerities and retrenchments. The royal government actively and aggressively cut down government expenditures from 10.8 million (54 billion baht adjusted for inflation) to 6.8 million baht (34 billion baht adjusted for inflation) during the 1926–1927 fiscal year through reduction of the size of the bureaucracy. Many government positions were merged and those unnecessary ones were dissolved, accompanied by dismissals of a great number of bureaucrats and cutting of salaries of the remaining officials. Even some provincial Monthons were merged. This policy had some positive effects as Siam's state finance shifted from deficit to surplus within three years but these developments bred political resentments from the educated bureaucratic middle class, who found themselves suddenly unemployed, towards the royal government. Bangkok's ever-flourishing political newspapers, the mouthpieces of the middle class, expressed fiery opinions towards absolutist Siamese royal regime. This compelled Prajadhipok's government to enact another law to restrict press freedom in 1927, decreeing that those who committed lèse-majesté would be condemned as enemies of the nation. Academic teachings of economic principles were also banned.

==== Siamese revolution of 1932 ====
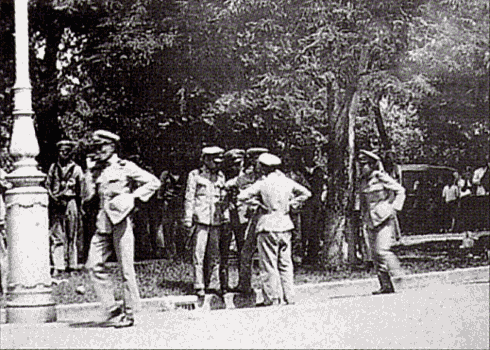
Group of soldiers standing on Royal Plaza waiting for orders during the Revolution, 24 June 1932

In 1932, with the country deep in depression, the Supreme Council opted to introduce cuts in spending, including the military budget. The king foresaw that these policies might create discontent, especially in the army, and he therefore convened a special meeting of officials to explain why the cuts were necessary. In his address he stated the following, "I myself know nothing at all about finances, and all I can do is listen to the opinions of others and choose the best... If I have made a mistake, I really deserve to be excused by the people of Siam."

No previous monarch of Siam had ever spoken in such terms. Many interpreted the speech not as Prajadhipok apparently intended, namely as a frank appeal for understanding and cooperation. They saw it as a sign of his weakness and evidence that a system which perpetuated the rule of fallible autocrats should be abolished. Serious political disturbances were threatened in the capital, and in April 1932 the king agreed to introduce a constitution under which he would share power with a prime minister. This was not enough for the radical elements in the army. On 24 June 1932, while the king was at the seaside, the Bangkok garrison mutinied and seized power, led by a group of 49 officers known as "Khana Ratsadon". Thus ended 800 years of absolute monarchy.

Thai political history was little researched by Western Southeast Asian scholars in the 1950s and 1960s. Thailand, as the only nominally "native" Southeast Asian polity to escape colonial conquest, was deemed to be relatively more stable as compared with other newly independent states in Southeast Asia. It was perceived to have retained enough continuity from its "traditions", such as the institution of the monarchy, to have escaped from the chaos and troubles caused by decolonisation and to resist the encroachment of revolutionary communism. By implication, this line of argument suggests the 1932 revolution was nothing more than a coup that simply replaced the absolute monarchy and its aristocracy with a commoner elite class made up of Western-educated generals and civilian bureaucrats and essentially that there was little that was revolutionary about this event. David K. Wyatt, for instance, described the period of Thai history from 1910 to 1941 as "essentially the political working out of the social consequences of the reforms of Chulalongkorn's reign". The 1932 revolution was generally characterised as the inevitable outcome of "natural consequences of forces set in motion by Rama IV and Rama V".

== Kingship ==
=== Traditional kingship ===
==== Kingship concept and ideology ====
Siam had been under absolute monarchy who wielded legislative, executive and judicial powers. Early Bangkok kings, first three kings of the Chakri dynasty, inherited kingship concept from Ayutthayan kingship, which had been dominated by Angkorian-Khmer-derived Devaraja or God-King cult, in which the king was consecrated as deity on earth through the Hindu Rajabhisekha enthronement ceremony. A Siamese king held absolute authority over his subjects in the kingdom, being Chao Chiwit or Lord of Life and Chao Phaendin or Lord of Land. The king owned all lands in his kingdom before being distributed to his subjects and was empowered to deliver death sentences to any of his subjects per his judgement. Royal commands were called Phra Ratcha Ongkarn (from Sanskrit oṅkāra, through Old Khmer oṅkāra) and his capital city was called Krung Thep (City of the Deity). Like other contemporary Southeast Asian monarchs, Siamese king was a Chakravartin, which has two aspects; the Glorious Universal Conqueror who won military successes in battles and the aspect of King of Universal Justice, who upheld and protected the Thammasat moral law.

Even though no human law could restrict Siamese king's authority, morally, the king was compelled to observe Ten Kingly Virtues or Thotsaphit Ratchatham and to follow the way of Thammasat or the Law of Manu. The king was also the sole legislator of the kingdom as his commands were inscribed to become law although, in theory, his laws and commands could not deviate from the Thammasat or the established norms. In contrast to Ayutthaya, King Rama I sought rhetoric and explanation from orthodox Theravada Buddhism as the basis for his royal decrees. Buddhist aspect of Siamese kingship, pertaining to the concept of Dharmaraja or the Dharma-upholding king, was reaffirmed through the promulgation of the Three Seals Law in 1804 to restore the original pure form of Thammasat. However, Early Bangkok kingship remained essentially the same as that of Ayutthaya.

Siamese king was revered by his subjects as a deity on earth and was treated as such. In a royal audience, the king sat high on elaborate royal throne with his ministers and officials prostrating on the floor with their hands joined, not looking at the king nor wearing upper garments, bare-chested. In speaking with royalty, a special language register known as Rachasap, characterized by Indic and Khmer-derived lexicons, was used. Siamese subjects used extreme deference in their conversation with the king, referring to themselves as Kha Phra Phutthachao or "Servant of Buddha" as the first person pronoun and addressing the king as Taifa La-ong Thuli Phrabat or "Under the Specks of Dusts Under the Royal Feet" as second person pronoun. Whenever the king went out of royal palace on processions, royal policemen would tell commoners to go inside, shut the doors and windows, never to physically and directly look at the king as common eyes should never cast on the king's divine body, lest they would be shot with earthen pellet at the eye as punishment, also possibly for security reasons. The king's person or any royal figures should never be physically touched. During royal barge processions in the rivers, if any members of royalty were sinking and drowning, it was forbidden for anyone to swim to save that royal person on the pain of death.

==== Enthronement ceremony ====
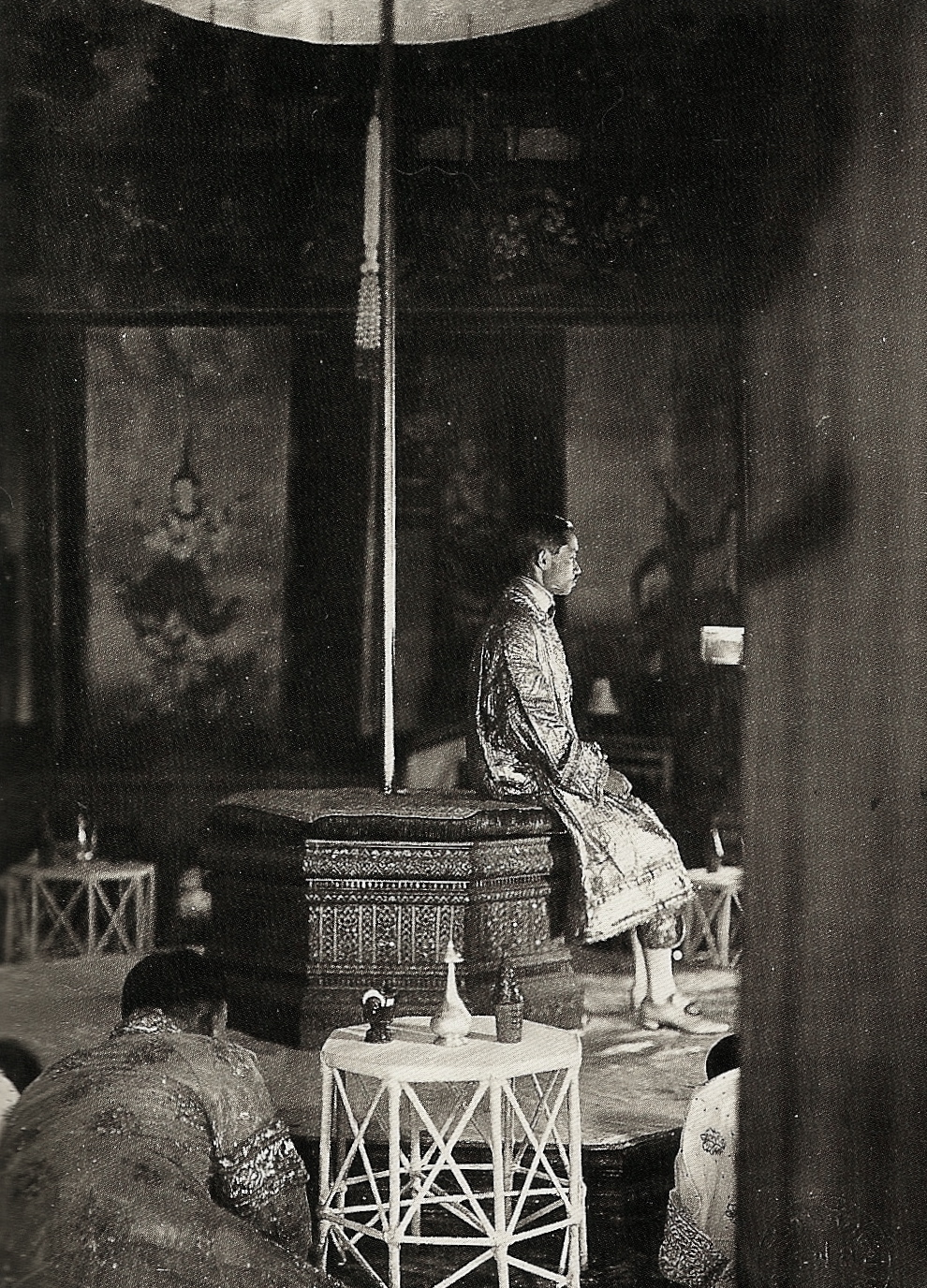
King Prajadhipok sat on the octagonal throne to be blessed by Brahmins in eight directions during Rajabhisekha ceremony in February 1927.

Siamese enthronement ceremony, known as Rajabhisekha, from Sanskrit Raja 'king' and Abhisekha 'to anoint with holy water', originated from Vedic Rajasuya. The ritual, which was conducted by the Hindu court Brahmins, mainly involved bathing in and pouring upon the king the sacred water, which was procured from five Siamese rivers and four ponds in Suphanburi, and the Bramanistic blessing, in which the king sat on the fig-wood Athadisa octagonal throne to be anointed by the Brahmins eight times each in eight directions. The king then sat on the Bhadrapita throne, when the High Brahmins or Phra Maha Rajaguru recited a Tamil mantra to open the portal of Kailasha to invite the Hindu god Shiva to merge into the king's person. The king thus became an avatar of celestial deities. The High Brahmins then presented the king with royal regalia and a full ceremonial name inscribed on a golden plate. Finally, the king relayed his first command or Omkara. The Siamese royal insignia included:

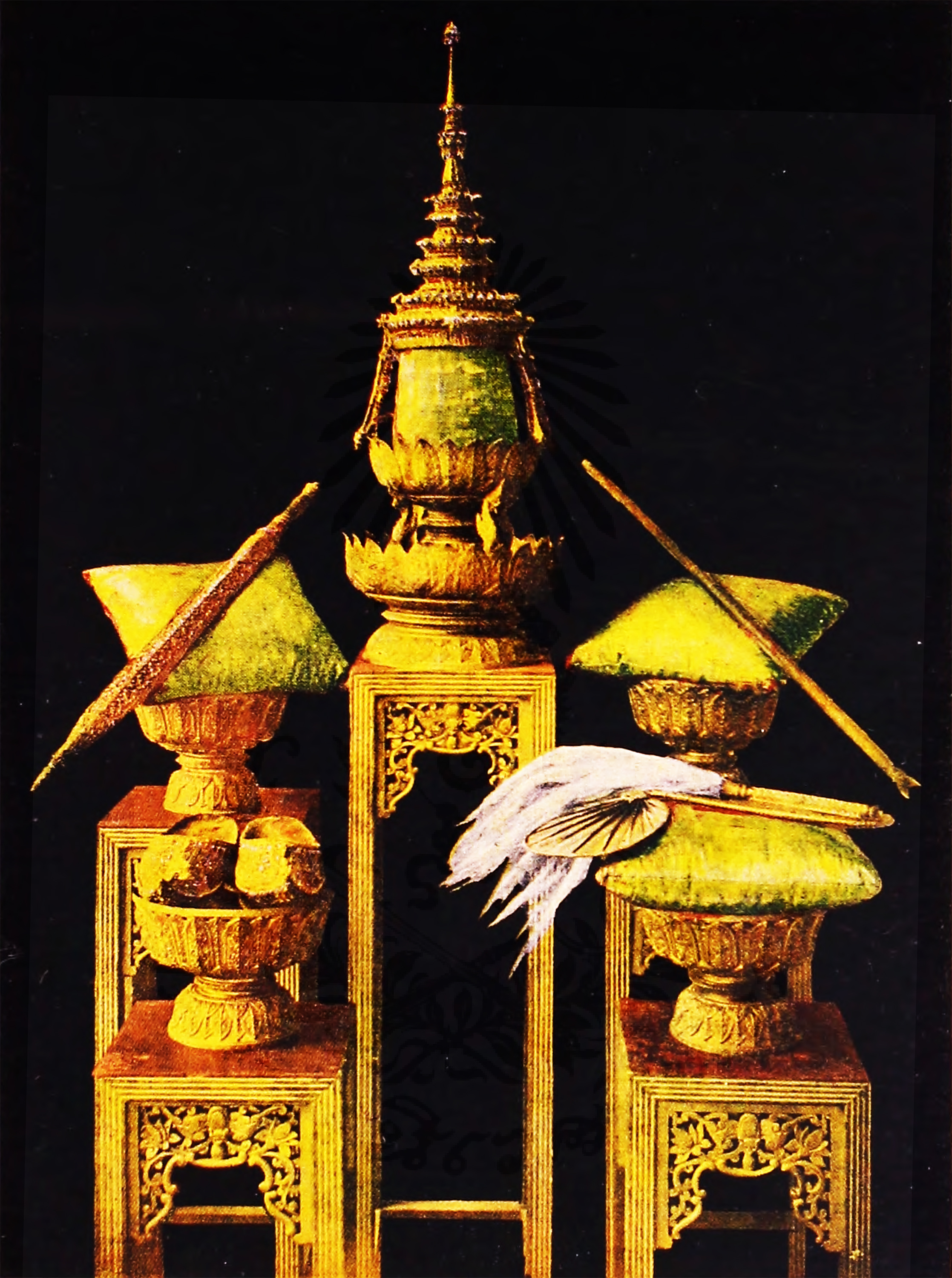
Thai royal regalia, clockwise from top; the Great Crown of Victory, the Royal Staff, the Fan and the Flywhisk, Royal Slippers and the Sword of Victory.

- Royal Nine-Tiered Umbrella (นพปฎลมหาเศวตฉัตร)
- Great Crown of Victory (พระมหาพิชัยมงกุฎ)
- Sword of Victory (พระแสงขรรค์ชัยศรี)
- Royal Slippers (ฉลองพระบาทเชิงงอน)
- Royal Staff (ธารพระกร)
- Royal Fan and Flywhisk

==== Regnal naming convention ====
During their reigns, early Chakri kings did not have specific names. Siamese people referred to their king as Phrachao Yuhua (God Above My Head) or Phra Phutthachao Yuhua (Lord Buddha Above My Head) as third person pronoun. During Rajabhisekha enthronement ceremony, the king received a full lengthy Indic ceremonial name inscribed on a golden plate but the name was kept in a sealed box not revealed to the public as the king's name was not known to common people. Moreover, the full ceremonial names of the first three kings of the Chakri dynasty; Kings Rama I, Rama II and Rama III, were identical as Siamese royal names served honorific purpose rather than identification. A recently deceased king was known as Phrachao Yuhua Nai Phra Borommakot (King In the Royal Urn).

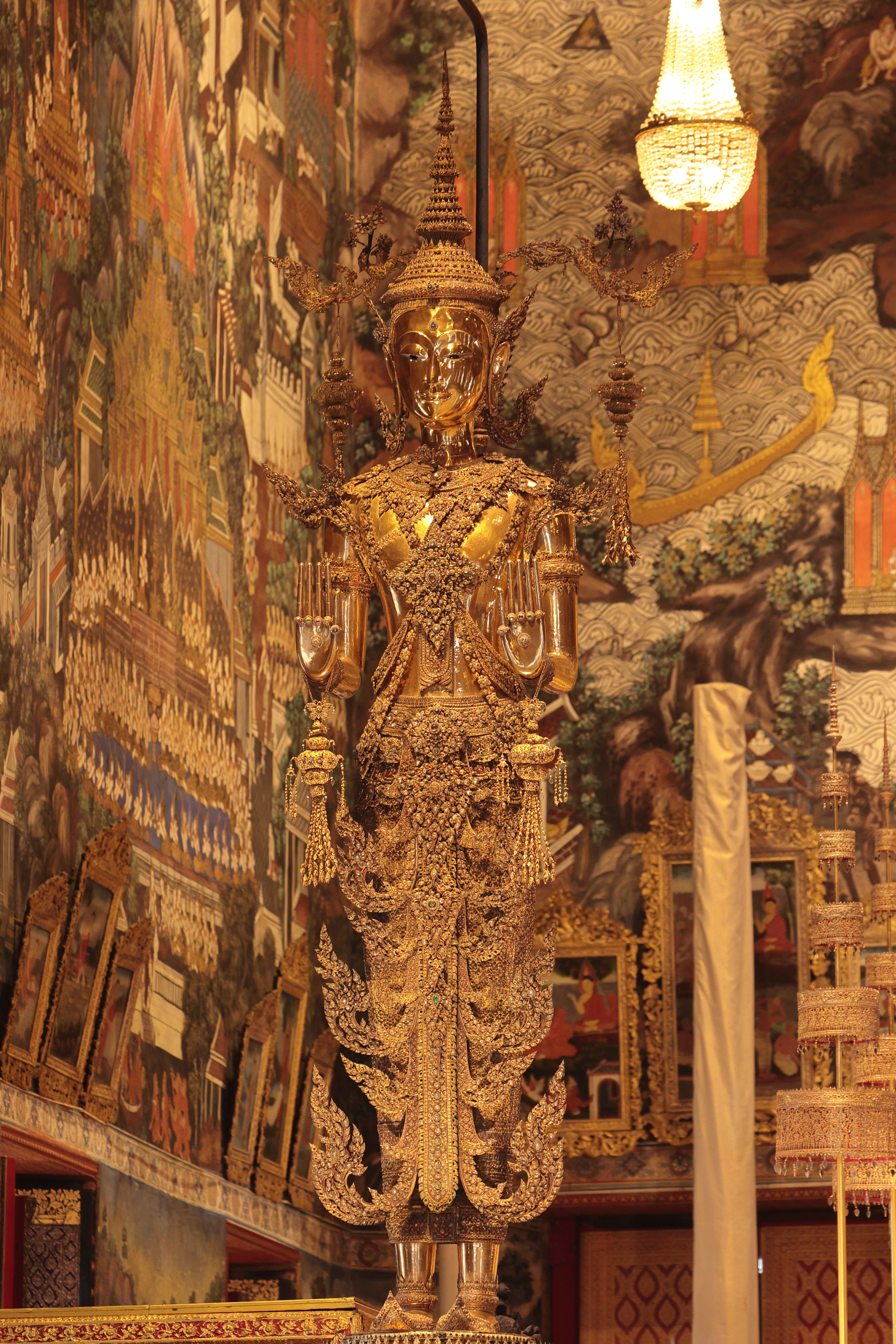
Phra Phuttha Loetla Naphalai

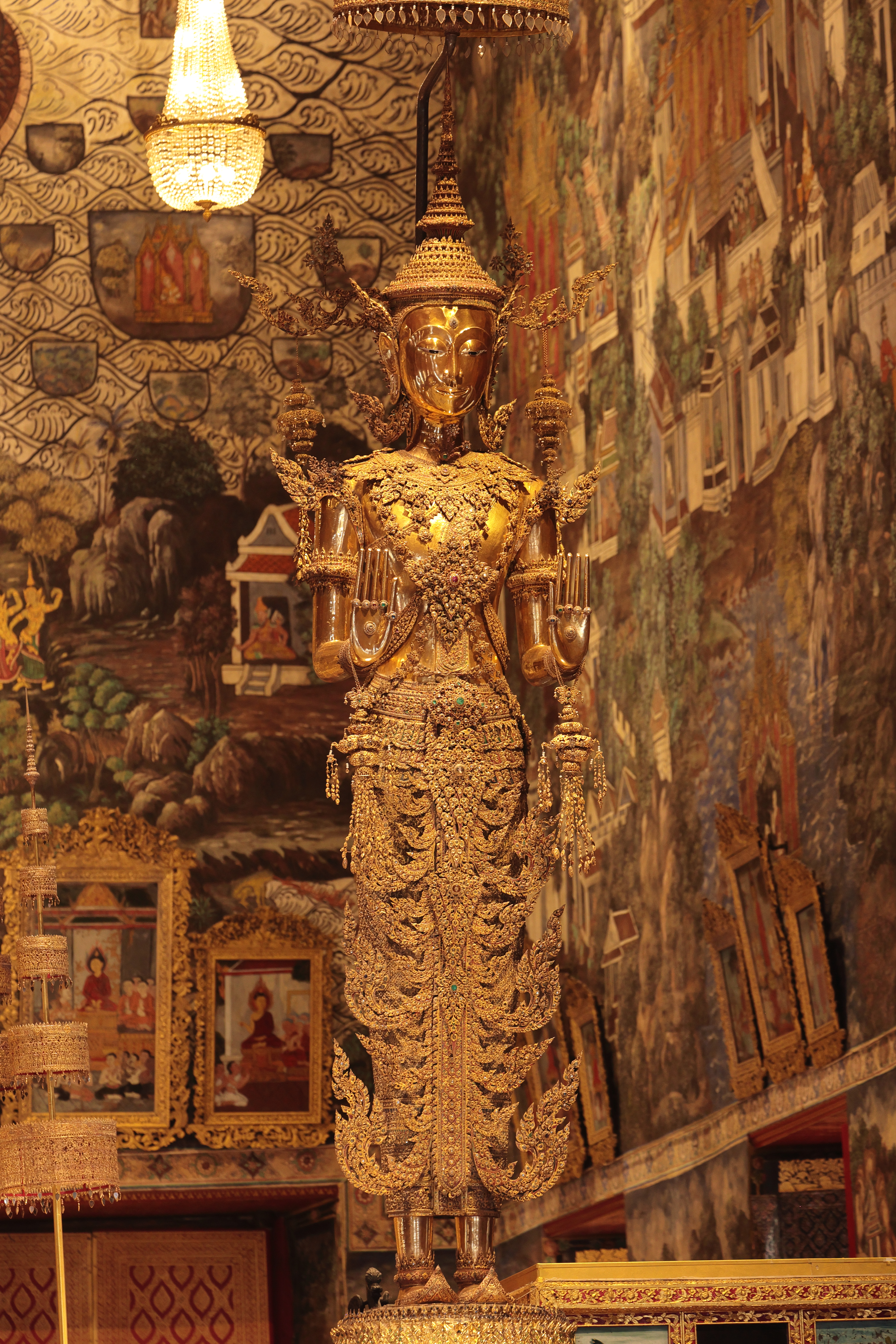
Phra Phuttha Yotfa Chulalok

In 1842, King Rama III ordered creation of two Buddha statues at Wat Phra Kaew dedicated to King Rama II and Rama I, respectively.

By mid-nineteenth century, the Siamese colloquially called their past kings Rama I as Phaendin Ton (Earlier Reign), Rama II as Phaendin Klang (Middle Reign) and the incumbent king Rama III as Phaendin Plai (Later Reign). King Rama III himself found this popular nomenclature inappropriate so he assigned official posthumous names to his predecessors. In 1842, King Rama III ordered casting of two golden Buddha statues at the Wat Phra Kaew Temple dedicated to his grandfather King Rama I and his father King Rama II. King Rama I was then known as "Phuttha Yotfa Chulalok" and King Rama II as "Phuttha Loetla Sulalai", posthumously named after the two Buddha statues dedicated to them.

King Mongkut invented a systematic regnal naming convention with the suffix -klao. Upon his ascension in 1851, King Mongkut took the regnal name Chomklao. In 1852, King Mongkut assigned posthumous names to his predecessors. King Rama I was known as "Phuttha Yotfa Chulalok". King Rama II was known as "Phuttha Loetla Naphalai". King Rama III was posthumously named as Nangklao. Mongkut's son King Chulalongkorn ascended the throne in 1868, taking the regnal name Chulachomklao. The word Ratchakan began to be used to refer to reigns. For example, Ratchakarn Thi Ha meant the Fifth Reign, corresponding to King Chulalongkorn. King Vajiravudh ascended the throne as King Mongkutklao in 1910.

Siamese royal names and titles were complicated for Westerners to comprehend so King Vajiravudh, also called Ratchakarn Thi Hok or the Sixth Reign, adopted a Westernized dynastic regnal naming convention in 1916, in which all kings of the Chakri dynasty were given the name "Rama" followed by numerical order in Western style. Therefore, Phuttha Yotfa Chulalok became known as King Rama I, Phuttha Loetla Naphalai as Rama II, King Nangklao as Rama III, King Mongkut or Chomklao as Rama IV, King Chulalongkorn or Chulachomklao as Rama V and King Vajiravudh or Mongkutklao as Rama VI. King Prajadhipok ascended the throne in 1925 as King Pokklao, also known as King Rama VII or Ratchakarn Thi Chet the Seventh Reign.

=== Modernized kingship ===
==== Reforms of King Mongkut ====
King Mongkut, who had been a Buddhist monk for 27 years, during which he learned about Western philosophy, ascended the throne in 1851. King Mongkut greatly reformed the Siamese kingship concept and ideology. Even before his enthronement, Mongkut ordered court officials to wear upper garments during royal events as being bare-chested would be considered uncivilized by Westerners. King Mongkut added Buddhist elements to his Rajabhisekha enthronement ceremony, which had previously been mostly a Hindu ritual, as he emphasized the Buddhist dimension of Siamese kingship and also appeared more visible to general populace. Mongkut was the first Siamese king to actually wear the Great Crown of Victory to give the Western-style 'coronation' sense. Western representatives were also present for the first time. Mongkut adopted an epithet Maha Chonnikorn Samoson Sommut or "Elected by Consensus of All," emphasizing the Buddhist concept of Maha Sommutiraj or the Great Elected King, in which the populace elected the most capable one as their leader, as the basis for his kingship, even though he was not actually elected by modern sense.

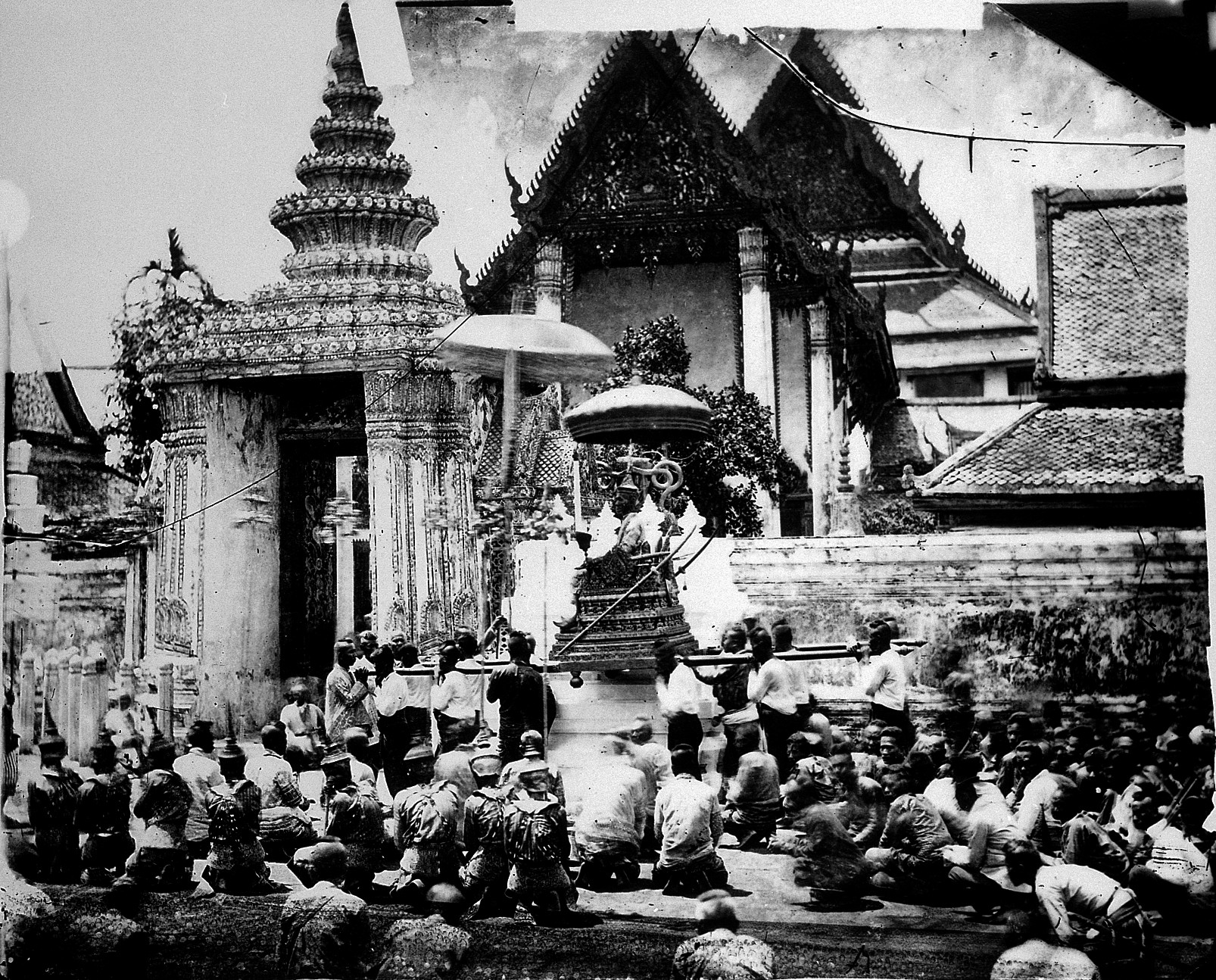
Royal procession of King Mongkut to Wat Pho temple with people sitting around, taken by John Thompson in 1865.

Mongkut officially abolished the practice of eye-shooting in 1857 and encouraged commoners to come out of their houses to prostrate outside to see the king during royal processions. Mongkut appeared to be the first Siamese king to go on non-military, non-religious journeys to visit his subjects the provinces. During late 1857 to early 1858, King Mongkut went on his journey along the Eastern Siamese shoreline, visiting Chonburi, Rayong, Chanthaburi, Trat and Koh Chang. In 1859, King Mongkut embarked on a royal visit to Southern Siam from Pranburi to Nakhon Si Thammarat and Songkhla. Mongkut went on another trip to Southern Siam in 1863, embarking on a modern steamboat, going as far as Pattani. King Mongkut was also the first Siamese king to adopt the exonym "Siam" for his kingdom, styling himself as Rex Siamensis or "King of Siam" in Latin.

==== Reforms of King Chulalongkorn ====
King Chulalongkorn ascended the throne in 1868 at the age of fifteen under regency of the powerful Bunnag minister Chaophraya Si Suriyawong. The young king Chulalongkorn embarked on educational trip in March 1871, visiting Singapore in British Malaya, visiting Batavia and Semarang in Dutch Java to observe Western colonial administration, becoming the first Siamese king to travel abroad. Later that year, in December 1871, Chulalongkorn went on another journey through Singapore, Malacca and Penang in British Malaya to Moulmein and Rangoon in British Burma to visit British India, disembarking at Calcutta in January 1872, going through Delhi, Agra, Lucknow, Bombay and Benares. Chulalongkorn assumed power at the end of regency in 1873 and abolished the practice of prostration in royal official audiences, which Chulalongkorn described as the symbol of oppression, in 1874. Siamese subjects then stood before the king in royal audiences and bowed to the king in Western-style gesture rather than prostrating.

Royal coat of arms and emblem of the Kingdom of Siam from 1878 to 1910

In theory, Siamese king's legislative innovation had been limited by Thammasat or traditional moral law as the king's law could not deviate from the Thammasat. In the face of Western colonial threats and modernization, the kingdom needed new laws for the reforms. Chulalongkorn relied on new Western-influenced or Buddhism-inspired humanist principles as the basis of his kingship. Instead of being a deified esoteric figure, the king was portrayed as caring and providing for the basic needs and well-being of the populace, while also upholding the traditions. Monarchy existed as a social necessity, stemming from natural practice of mankind rather than sacred divine authority. King Chulalongkorn adopted the Western concept of absolute monarchy but also reaffirmed traditional Siamese kingship concept of unlimited royal power and authority unrestraint by any non-religious laws. Siamese kingship under King Chulalongkorn was thus de-Hinduized and Europeanized.

King Chulalongkorn was a keen traveler as he traveled both for leisure and businesses. He visited Southern Siam and the Malay tributary sultanates in 1889 and 1890. King Chulalongkorn visited Dutch Java for the second time in 1896. After the Paknam Incident of 1893 that threatened Siam's independence, King Chulalongkorn embarked on a grand European tour to promote the image of his kingdom as a civilized modern nation in April 1897, going through the Suez Canal, the king arrived first in Italy. Chulalongkorn visited major European cities including Paris, London, Geneva, Copenhagen, Berlin, Frankfurt, going as far as Russia, visiting St. Petersburg and Moscow, where he met Tsar Nicolas II. During his absence, Chulalongkorn appointed his queen Saovabha to be the regent in Siam. In 1902, Chulalongkorn personally visited Singapore to discuss the matter of Malay sultanates with Frank Swettenham the Governor of Straits Settlements. King Chulalongkorn visited Europe for second time in 1907, appointing his son the Crown Prince Vajiravudh as the regent in his absence, this time focusing on seeking cure for his health conditions, spending time in medicinal baths in Baden-Baden.

As the king's relation with his subjects was redefined, law concerning offenses against the monarchy or lèse-majesté was modernized. In pre-modern Siamese law, acting or speaking against the king was subjected to punishments; either one of decapitation, fission of mouth to the ears, amputation of limbs, lashes of rattan strokes, imprisonment, forced corvée labor or simple monetary fines. In 1900, King Chulalongkorn enacted the first modern Siamese lèse-majesté law, in which any persons who spoke or published contents defaming the king or any royal figures would be subjected to imprisonment or fine. This modern lèse-majesté law was incorporated into the Siamese Penal Code of 1908, the first modernized Thai legal code, in which the lèse-majesté offence was subjected to seven-year imprisonment or fine. This new Siamese royal defamation law was similar to those of other contemporary monarchies including German Empire and Japan.

== Government ==
=== Traditional government ===
==== Central government ====
Rajasiha Seal, the Seal of the Mahatthai Office of Samuha Nayok the Prime Minister of Northern Siam, later becomes the Seal of modern Thai Ministry of Interior.

In the early period, Rattanakosin inherited most of the bureaucratic apparatus from the late Ayutthaya. The Siamese royal court bureaucracy centred on the six ministries. The two top prime ministers of the court were Samuha Nayok (สมุหนายก), the Prime Minister of Northern Siam who oversaw the Mahatthai or Ministry of Interior, and Samuha Kalahom (สมุหกลาโหม), the Prime Minister of Southern Siam who oversaw the Kalahom or Ministry of Military. Below them were the Four Ministries or Chatusadom (จตุสดมภ์);

- Krom Vieng (กรมเวียง) or Krom Phra Nakhonban (กรมพระนครบาล), the Police Bureau, was headed by Chao Phraya Yommaraj (เจ้าพระยายมราช)
- Kromma Wang (กรมวัง), the Ministry of Palatial Affairs, was headed by Chao Phraya Thamma
- Krom Khlang (กรมคลัง), the Ministry of Trade and Treasury, was headed by Chao Phraya Phrakhlang (เจ้าพระยาพระคลัง)
- Krom Na (กรมนา), the Ministry of Agriculture, was headed by Chao Phraya Pollathep (เจ้าพระยาพลเทพ)

Government officials were ranked by Bandasak (บรรดาศักดิ์) levels and the Sakdina (ศักดินา). The Bandasak levels determined the official's position in the bureaucratic hierarchy (see Thai nobility). The Bandasak levels were, in descending order; Chaophraya, Phraya, Phra, Luang, Khun, Meun, Phan and Nai.

Sakdina is the theoretical amount of land and numerical rank accorded to an official for his position in bureaucracy, which determined the amount of production received and the severity of punishment for crime. The Sakdina of each every single government position was described in the Three Seals Law. For example, the Sakdina of Samuha Nayok, Samuha Kalahom and the Four Ministers of Chatusadom were 10,000 rai each.

==== Regional government ====
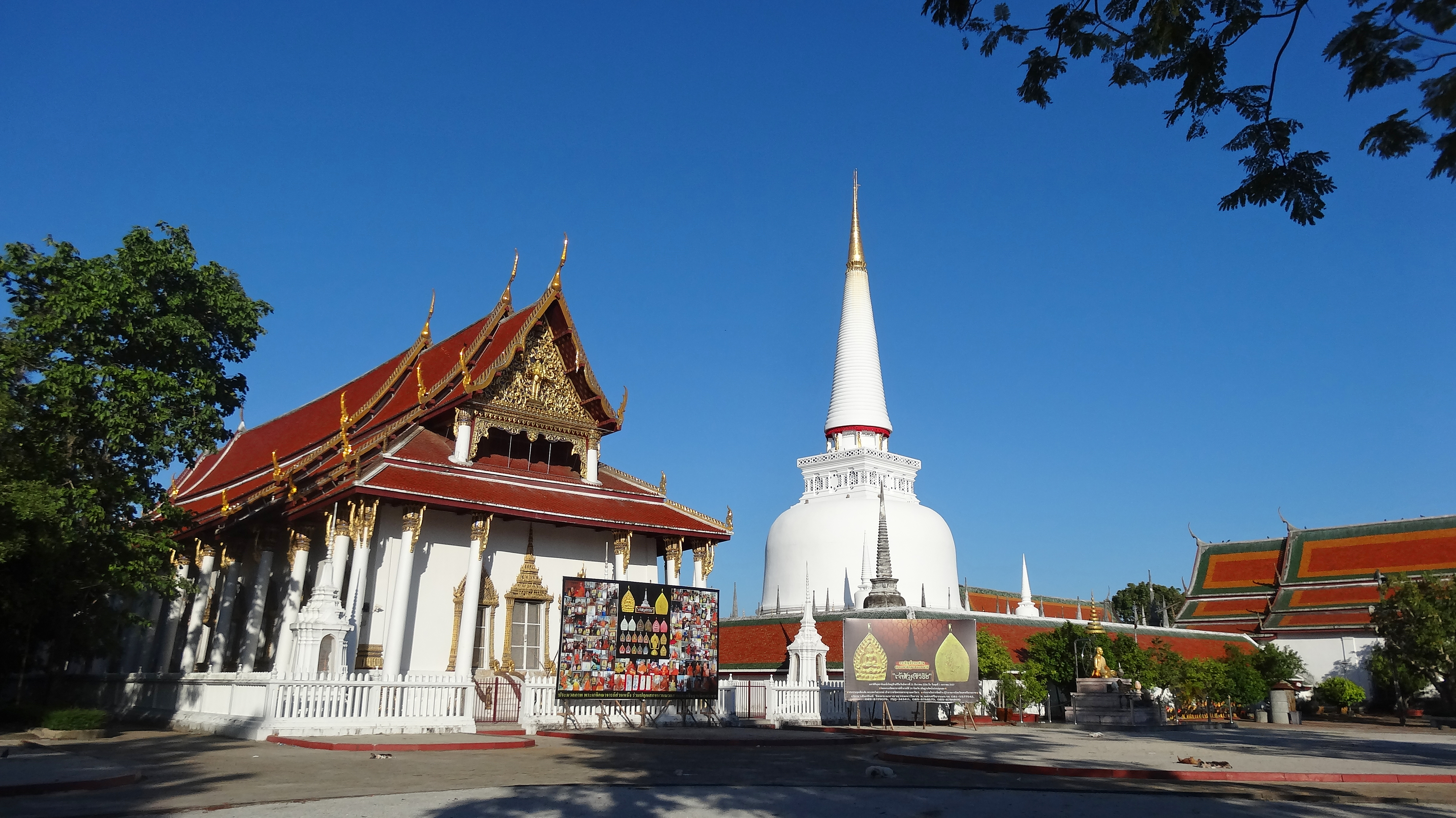
Nakhon Si Thammarat, the political and cultural centre of Southern Siam, was one of the Mueang Eks or first level cities that held authorities over surrounding satellite towns.

Cities and towns in 'Siam proper', which correspond roughly to modern Central and Southern Thailand, were organized into the 'Hierarchy of Cities', in which small towns were under the jurisdiction of larger cities. There were four levels of cities, in descending order; the Mueang Ek (เมืองเอก, first-class city), Mueang Tho (เมืองโท, second-class city), Mueang Tri (เมืองตรี, third-class city) and Mueang Chattawa (เมืองจัตวา, fourth level city). Mueang Ek was the highest level of city representing regional centre. The Mueang Eks in the Rattanakosin period were Nakhon Si Thammarat, which was the centre of Southern Siam, and Nakhon Ratchasima, which was the centre of the northeast. Phitsanulok, which had been the centre of Northern Siam, used to be Mueang Ek in the Ayutthaya period. However, Phitsanulok was largely depopulated in the early Rattanakosin due to the wars in the Thonburi period and its role as an outpost against northern Burmese invasions diminished in favor of Chiang Mai. The cities and towns in Northern Siam were under jurisdiction of Samuha Nayok and Southern Siam under Samuha Kalahom.

The governors of cities were ranked according to the level and importance of their cities. The governors of Mueang Eks were usually ranked Chaophraya. The local bureaucracy in each city was headed by the governor. Below the governor was the vice-governor called either Palat (ปลัด) or Tukkarat (ทุกขราษฏร์), Below the vice-governor was the deputy vice-governor called Yokkrabat (ยกกระบัตร). The governorship of large cities were usually passed down through generations of the same family due to that family's important role and connections in the area.

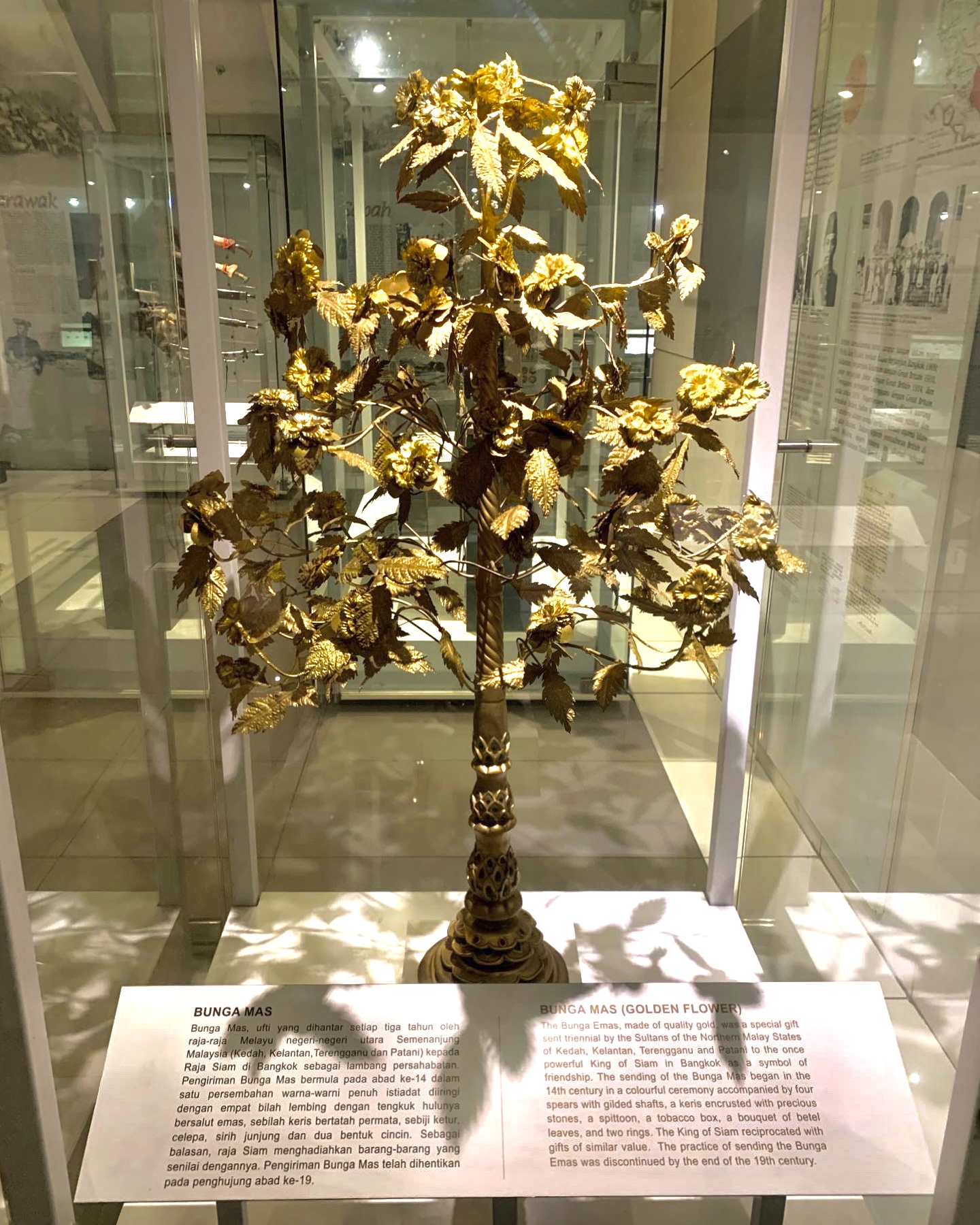
Tributary kingdoms of Siam were required to periodically send the ceremonial golden and silver trees as tributes to the Bangkok court.

The tributary kingdoms were called Prathetsarat (ประเทศราช), each of which were political entities in its own rights and bound to Siam through the Southeast Asian political ideology of mandala system. Native culture and traditions were largely retained. The Siamese court required the periodic presentation of ceremonial golden and silver trees and the provision of other resources. In wartime, tributary kingdoms were requested to send troops or to join the war on behalf of Siam. Tributary kingdoms of the Rattanakosin included;

- Lanna Kingdom (modern Northern Thailand), which was subdivided into the Kingdoms of Chiang Mai, Lampang and Lamphun under the rule of the Chetton dynasty. The principalities of Phrae and Nan were other princedoms ruled by local dynasties.
- Lao kingdoms of Luang Phrabang, Vientiane and Champasak
- Semi-independent chiefdoms in Isan region.
- Cambodia (contested with Vietnam)
- Pattani
- Northern Malay Sultanates; Kedah (including Perlis and Setul), Kelantan and Terengganu.

The governors of large cities, in practice, were also in charge of the affairs of its adjacent tributary kingdoms. The governor of Nakhon Ratchasima was responsible for the affairs in Lao kingdoms of Vientiane and Champasak. The governor of Nakhon Si Thammarat (Ligor) was responsible for the affairs in Kedah and Kelantan. The governor of Songkhla was responsible for the affairs in Pattani and Terengganu.

=== Modernized government ===
==== Central government ====
Timeline of Primeministers

Ayutthayan constitution, dated to 1455, prescribed the Siamese central government apparatus that persisted for four centuries into the late nineteenth century. Traditional Siamese government was headed by two chief ministers the Samuha Nayok of Mahatthai or Civil department and the Samuha Kalahom of Kalahom or Military department. However, this apparatus had undergone amendments to serve the certain conditions. Functional division of government departments became blurred. By the early nineteenth century, distinction between the Samuha Nayok and Kalahom had transformed from civilian-military duality to Samuha Nayok becoming the Minister of the North and Kalahom the Minister of the South, each overseeing both civilian and military affairs in their regions. By mid-nineteenth century, traditional Siamese central government structure became ineffective, with blurred and overlapping administrative functions among the departments, in the face of Western colonialist threats and sovereignty questions and reforms were needed.

First change to this centuries-old apparatus occurred in 1875, when King Chulalongkorn established the Department of Treasury out of the traditional Phrakhlang or Treasury and Foreign Affair department as a part of the king's fiscal reforms to centralize and solidify taxation system. Phrakhlang department was then divided into two distinct Financial and Foreign Affair departments. Treasury department was raised to ministerial status in 1885. In 1887, King Chulalongkorn sent his half-brother Prince Devawongse the Minister of Foreign Affairs to attend the golden jubilee of Queen Victoria at London. Prince Devawongse also traveled to the United States and Japan to observe administrative structures of those modern states. From observations of Prince Devawongse, King Chulalongkorn began to experiment on functionality of government departments in 1888 by holding a council of ministers. The experimental ministers were mostly royal princes, brother and half-brothers of the king. The king sought to restore the functional differentiation, providing clear definition and delineation of administrative duties of each department. Chulalongkorn established first modern Siamese royal cabinet in April 1892, composing of twelve ministries including Ministry of the North (Mahatthai), Ministry of the South (Kalahom), Foreign Affairs, Ministry of Capital, Palace Affairs, Treasury, Agriculture, Justice, Military, Education, Public Works and Royal Secretariat, in which Prince Damrong was appointed as the Minister of Mahatthai. With creation of modern functional ministries, the traditional government apparatus, dated from Ayutthaya times four centuries earlier, was replaced by modern cabinet.

Regional division between Mahatthai and Kalahom continued for a few years. After the Paknam Incident of 1893, Prince Damrong the Minister of the North proposed the Thesaphiban system in 1894 that would centralize and integrate regional governments and quasi-independent tributary polities into provincial territorial administrative units. The idea of territorial division among the ministries were then abandoned as all provincial administration was put under the Mahatthai Ministry, which became the Ministry of Interior, under Prince Damrong, in March 1894. Military Ministry or Yutthanathikarn was incorporated into the Kalahom Ministry, which became the Ministry of Defence.

=== Law and judiciary ===
==== Traditional Siamese law and judiciary ====
The majority of Siamese legal corpus were lost in the fall of Ayutthaya in 1767. Siamese authorities then relied on scattered legal manuscripts to operate. In 1804, a woman who was in relationship with another man successfully sued for divorce from her husband. The husband complained that the court ruling was unjustified and appealed the case to King Rama I. King Rama I then opinioned that the existing laws of Siam were corrupted and ordered the recompilation of Ayutthaya laws to rectify and cleanse or chamra the laws of any distortions. The physical copies were imprinted with the three seals of Mahatthai (north), Kalahom (south) and Phrakhlang (treasury), signifying that the laws affected kingdom-wide and became known as the Three Seals Law that served the Siamese kingdom for the next century. The Siamese laws had taken the Indic Mānu-Dharmaśāstra as its model.

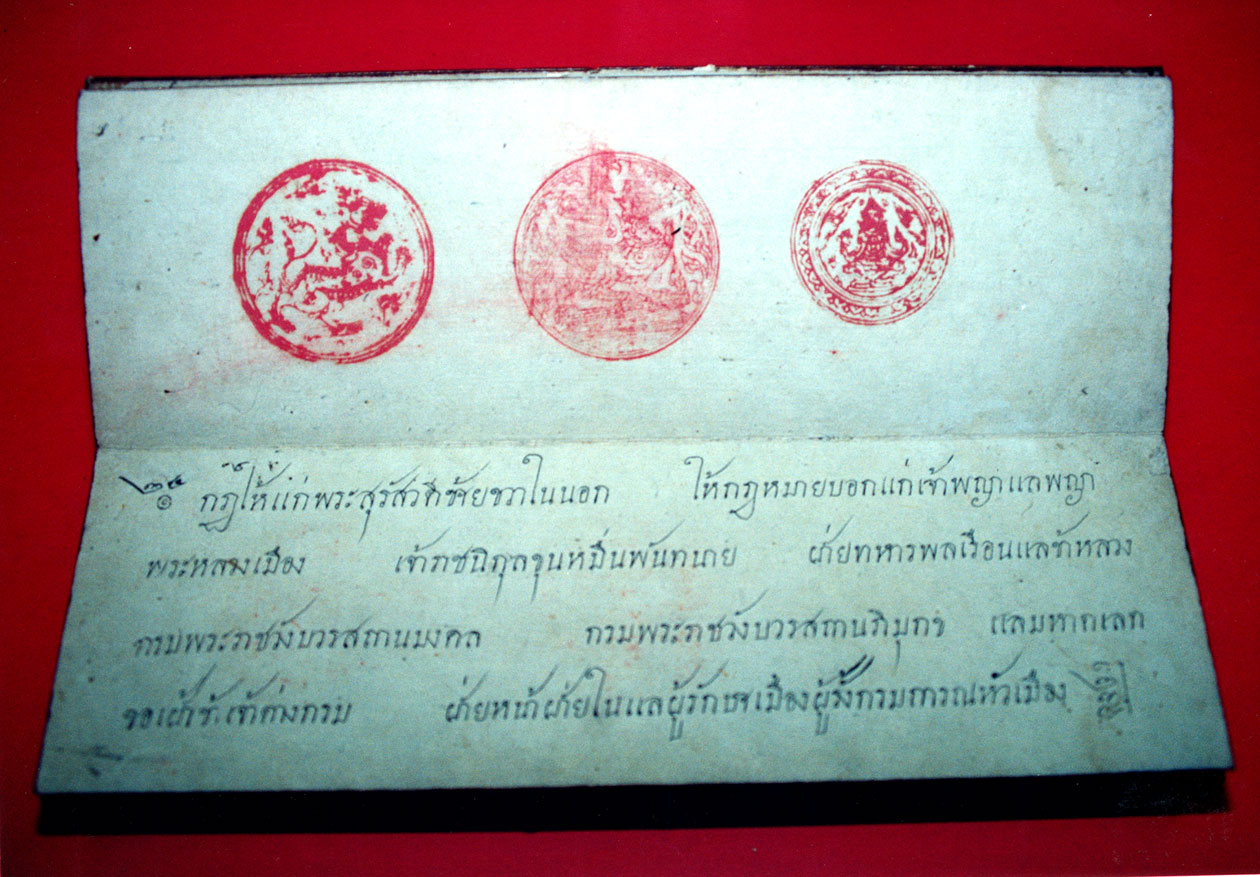
A physical copy of Palace Law, which was a part of the Three Seals Law, imprinted with the three seals of Mahatthai, Kalahom and Phrakhlang, displayed at the House of Representatives of Thailand

The king was the sole legislator of the kingdom. His words were recorded and inscribed to become laws. There was no single unified judiciary department as cases were distributed among the judging courts of each ministries according to the concerning matter. For example, foreign trade disputes belonged to the Kromma Tha or Trade Ministry and land disputes belonged to Krom Na or Ministry of Agriculture. The Mahatthai maintained the appeal court that settled cases from the primary courts. Unsettled cases from outlying cities were also appealed to Bangkok. When the appeal court failed to settle the case, it would be forwarded to the king himself. Presiding over the Supreme Royal Court was a part of royal daily routines.

Siamese law court involved two sets of legal personnel: the Lukkhun (ลูกขุน ณ ศาลหลวง) or council of twelve Bramanistic jurors who possessed legal knowledge and acted only as the advisory body of consultants but held no power to judge the cases and Tralakarn (ตระลาการ) or layman judges who carried out actual judgements under suggestions from the Lukkhun. The Nakhonban or Police Bureau dealt specifically with criminal cases including murder, robbery and adultery. The Nakhonban employed the trial by ordeal or judiciary tortures including compression of skull, hammering of nails and entering a large rattan ball to be kicked by an elephant. These torture methods were known as the Nakhonban creed (จารีตนครบาล) and were used only in certain circumstances in criminal cases. Sometimes when the issues were not settled, defendants were made to dive into water or walk into fire to prove their guilty or innocence. Westerners were particularly horrified by these methods of judiciary tortures and sought to dissociate themselves from traditional Siamese inquisition, resulting in the granting of extraterritoriality to Western nations in the Bowring Treaty of 1855 and other subsequent treaties.

==== Extraterritoriality and modern law ====
Westerners who came to Siam during the early nineteenth century were horrified of traditional Indo–Siamese judiciary system that involved trial by ordeal and trial by supernatural forces, especially in criminal cases and they were unwilling to be under jurisdiction of Siamese authorities. In the Bowring Treaty of 1855, Siamese court agreed to grant extraterritorial rights to British subjects in Siam, meaning that any legal cases concerning any British subjects, in both civil and criminal cases, would be tried and under jurisdiction of the newly established British consular court at Bangkok under British law rather than indigenous Siamese judiciary system, with the British consul himself acting as the judge. The United States acquired similar agreement with Siam in the Harris Treaty of 1856, France also in 1856 and other Western nations followed. These agreements of extraterritoriality were parts of the 'unequal treaties' and compromised Siamese sovereignty. Chinese immigrants, whose legal status in Siam was ambiguous, usually registered themselves as British or French subjects in order to avoid Siamese laws.

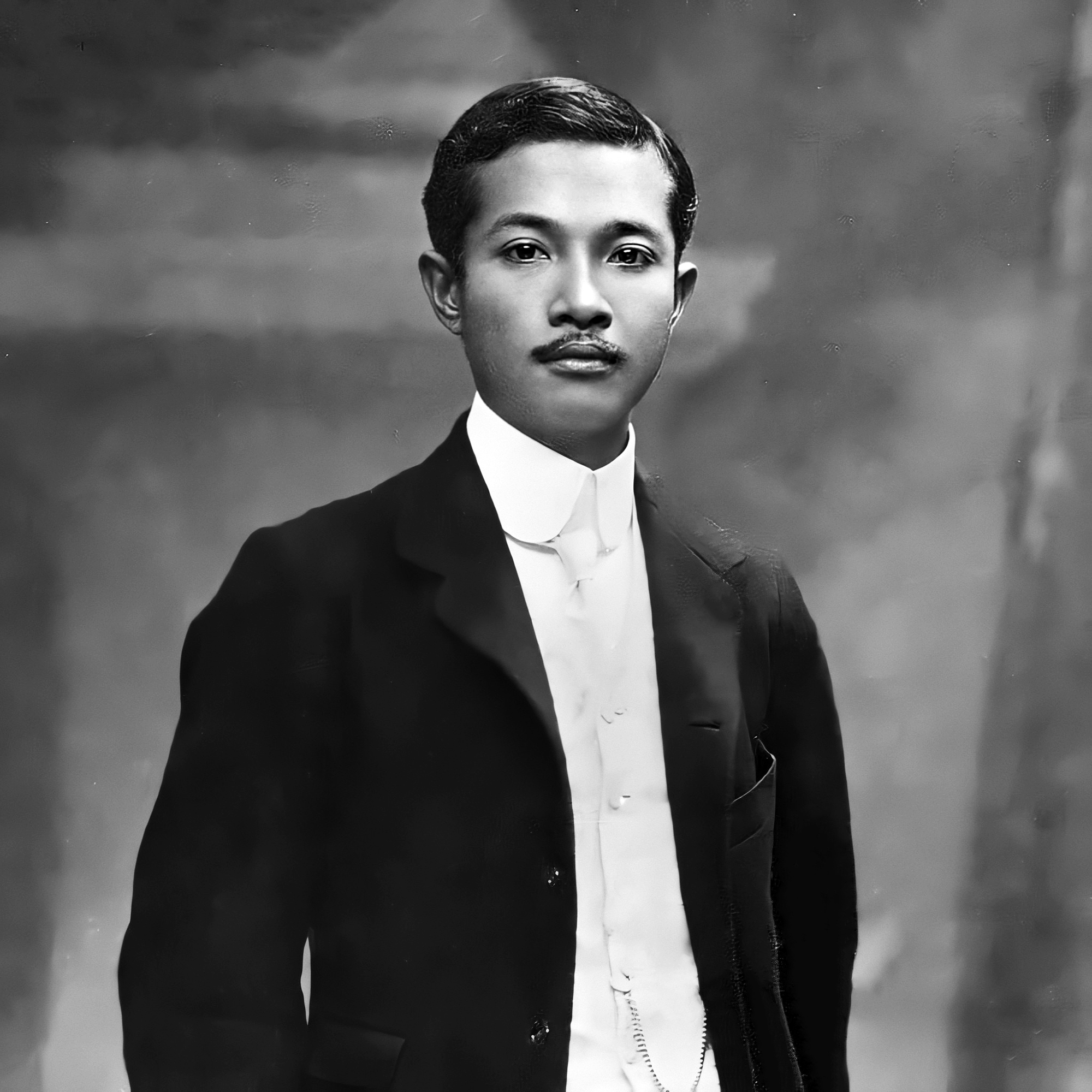
Prince Raphi Phatthanasak of Ratchaburi (1874–1920), son of Chulalongkorn, who studied law at the Faculty of Law, Oxford, was eulogized as the "Father of Modern Thai Law."

In 1892, King Chulalongkorn established modern Ministry of Justice in order to unify scattering Siamese judiciary courts of various departments into a single unified system. After French military threats to Bangkok during the Franco–Siamese War of 1893, Gustave Rolin-Jaequemyns, Chulalongkorn's Belgian advisor, told the king that violation of Siam's sovereignty by Western colonial powers was due to the fact that Siamese antiquated legal system, dated to Ayutthaya times, had not yet been modernized to conform with Western standards. Siamese government then began to consider abolition of Western extraterritorial jurisdiction in Siam to preserve Siam's sovereignty. Chulalongkorn established Legislative Council in 1897, composing of appointed Western legal specialists, to compose modern Siamese law based on the common law system, led by Prince Raphi, the king's son who had just graduated from Faculty of Law, Oxford, and Rolin-Jaequemyns himself. In 1898, Japan asked for extraterritorial rights from Siam. Siam agreed to grant extraterritoriality to Japan in Japan–Siam Treaty of 1898 on conditions that Japanese extraterritorial jurisdiction in Siam would terminate as soon as Siam completed its legislation of modernized civil and criminal codes.

Rolin-Jaequemyns left Siam in 1902 to return to his hometown in Belgium where he soon died. Georges Padoux, the king's new French legal advisor, was appointed as the head of legislative body in 1905. After the event of 1893, the French had been demanding that all 'French Asian subjects' in Siam, including the Laotians, the Cambodians and the Vietnamese, including those who had immigrated during pre-modern wars a century prior, come under French jurisdiction – a demand that Siamese government would not accept, leading to decade-long protracted Franco–Siamese negotiations. In the Franco–Siamese Treaty of 1907, the French assumed authority over existing French Asian subjects in Siam but left new registered French Asian subjects to Siamese jurisdiction in exchange for many lands in Laos and Cambodia going to French Indochina. The Penal Code, the first modern Siamese law, was promulgated in 1908. In the Penal Code of 1908, modern lèse-majesté or royal defamation law was introduced, with imprisonment up to seven years for insult of royalty. With a modern law in Siamese hands, the British surrendered most of their extraterritorial jurisdiction in Siam in the Anglo–Siamese Treaty of 1909, in which all British subjects in Siam, including both the British and the Burmese, became subjected to Siamese law, in exchange for Northern Malay sultanates joining British Malaya.

King Vajiravudh defined Thai nationality through his Thai Nationality (Sanchat Thai) Law of 1913, putting emphasis on paternal nationality. Any persons with a Thai father, regardless of birthplace, domestic or abroad, were to be classified as Thai citizens under Thai law. Siam joined World War I in 1917 on the Allies side, earning Siam an opportunity to re-negotiate and abolish Western extraterritoriality in Siam. According to Article 135 of the Treaty of Versailles (1919), extraterritorial jurisdiction of Germany and Austria-Hungary in Siam were retrospectively terminated from 1917 because they were war losers. For other Western nations, Siam sought to conclude a treaty with the United States first to procure a prototype for new treaties as America was then a rising dominating world power. In American–Siamese Treaty of 1920, American citizens in Siam came under Siamese law and legal system but, as the compilation of modern Siamese civil code had not yet completed, the American legation had rights, up to five years after completion of Siamese civil code, to evoke any cases it deemed appropriate from Siamese court. Siam in early twentieth century was in the time of press freedom and liberal political discussions. In 1922, Thai workers of Siam Electric tramline went on strike with support from socialist newspaper Kammakon ('Laborer'). King Vajiravudh then decided to contain freedom of press and restore order through his decree on books, documents and journals in 1923, in which document editors were made liable to punishments of lèse-majesté offense. Propagation of political and economic theories against the monarchy was also considered similar offense.

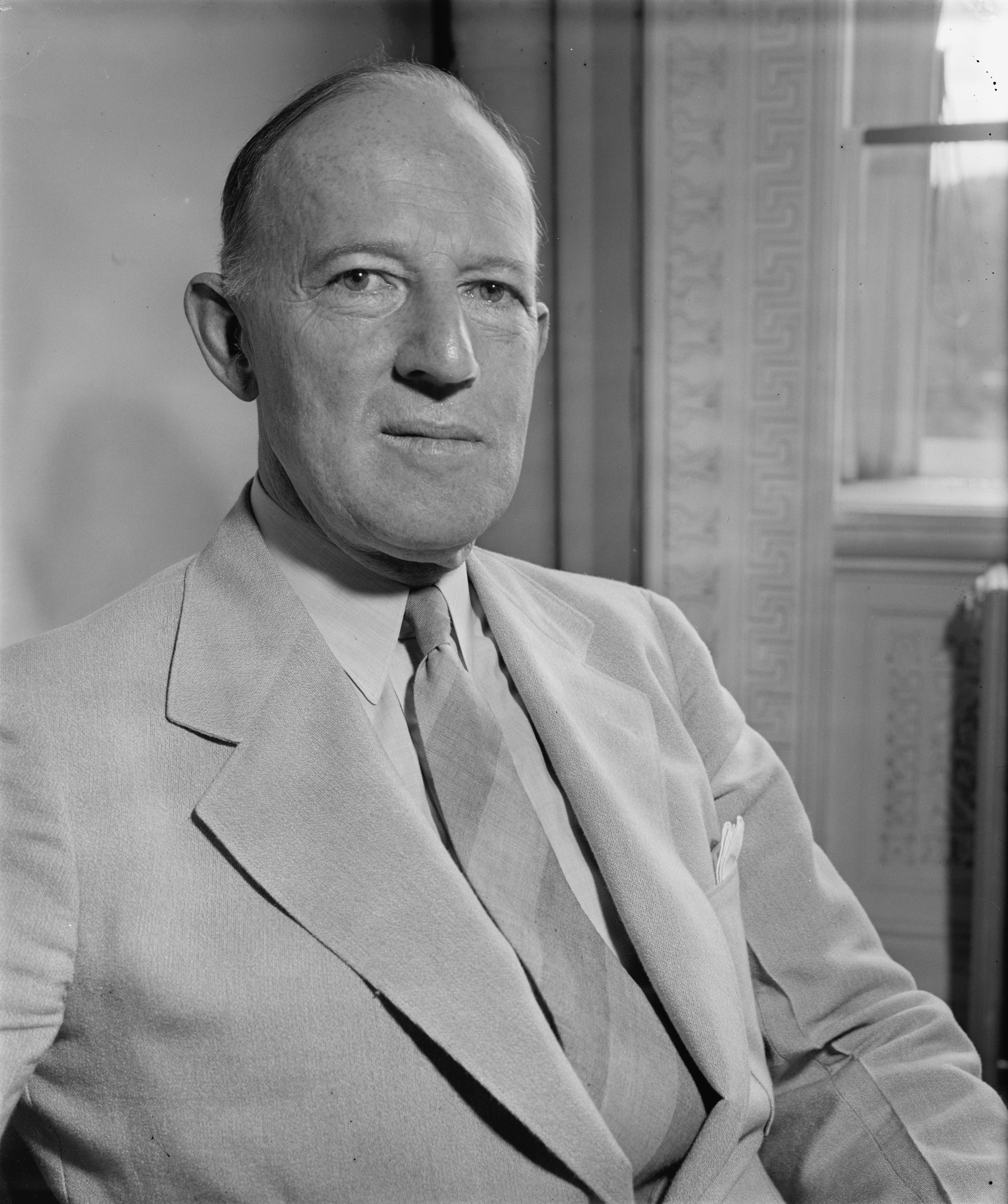
Francis Bowes Sayre Sr., with Siamese title Phraya Kanlayana Maitri, was commissioned by King Vajiravudh as Siamese delegate to renew treaties with European nations on equal terms during 1924–1925.

Japan–Siam Treaty of 1924 also put Japanese people in Siam under Siamese law under similar conditions to the Americans. King Vajiravudh assigned Phraya Kanlayana Maitri Francis Bowes Sayre, an American Harvard Law professor, to be the Siamese delegate to embark on a European tour in 1924–1926 to conclude new treaties with European nations of behalf of Siam. France agreed to new treaty with Siam in 1925, in which French subjects in nearly all parts of Siam, except for those in Monthon Ubon and Monthon Isan (modern Northeastern Thailand), came under Siamese law. King Prajadhipok decreed, in 1927, that those who committed lèse-majesté were to be classified as enemies of the nation. Compilation of modern Siamese civil code took decades to complete. It was only in 1926 that the first portion of Siamese Civil and Commercial code was issued. Siamese civil code was eventually completed in 1935 in post-revolution rule of Khana Ratsadon.

== Economy ==
=== Pre-Burney: 1782–1826 ===
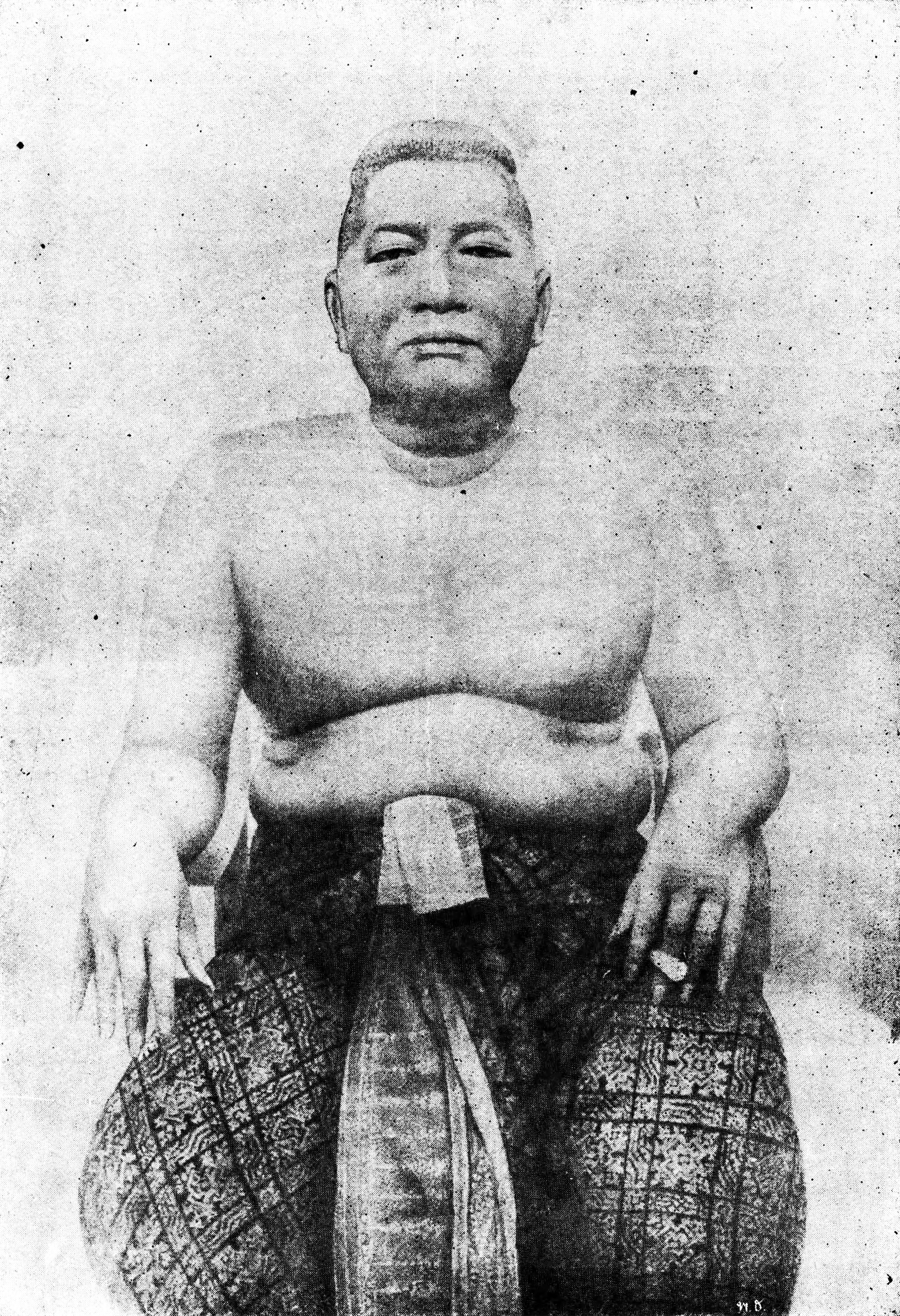
Phraya Siphiphat, personal name Dat Bunnag, was the head of Phra Khlang Sinkha or the Royal Warehouse from the 1820s to 1857. He later became Somdet Chao Phraya Borom Maha Phichaiyat.

Due to the raging wars and population dearth, the overall productivity of Siam in the early decades of Rattanakosin remained relatively low. The Siamese economy in the early Bangkok period was based on subsistence agrarian economy. Commoners lived on the production of their lands and the central authority levied taxes as income. Land was abundant, while manpower was in shortage. Taxation and Royal Junk expenditures were the main revenues of the royal court. Traditionally, as in Ayutthaya, the royal court levied four kinds of taxes;

- Tariffs, Changkob (จังกอบ); The royal court collected tariffs from both internal and external checkpoints called Khanon (ขนอน), both land and riverine, where officials inspected the commodity goods. One out of ten goods was collected by the Khanon. The Khanon also measured the width of the incoming ships to determine the size of the ship. Tariff was collected in accordance with the size of the ship, known as Phasi Pak Reua (ภาษีปากเรือ), or the measurement duties. Large ships paid more tariff. Arriving foreign traders were charged with tariffs. Phra Khlang Sinkha or the Royal Warehouse was responsible for the levy of Phasi Pak Reua on foreign merchant ships, which had been the major revenue for the royal court.
- Akon (อากร); taxes imposed on specific kinds of commodity such as rice, fruits and beverages. Rice producers were charged with two thangs of rice per one rai of agricultural land. The rice fields belonging to the nobility were exempted until the reign of King Rama III, who ordered rice fields belonging both to noblemen and commoners to pay tax in money of 0.375 baht per rai (1800 baht in today's money). Other specific kinds of products were levied included sugarcane, indigo, green beans, soybeans, sesame, tobacco, lemon basil, onions, turmeric, jutes, tamarinds, bananas, mangoes, betel nuts, coconuts, durians, oranges, etc. The largest Akon revenue were from the alcoholic spirit tax, fishery tax, market tax, gambling den tax, fruit orchard tax and the boat tax.
- Suai (ส่วย); levied from the Phrai suai who paid the tax in form of local valuables instead of serving corvee labors. Gold, lacquer, saltpeter, teak and beeswax were extracted from the hinterland regions of Khorat Plateau and the Upper Chao Phraya Basin for Bangkok. These forests products were usually sold to foreign merchants to benefit the royal court.
- Reucha (ฤชา); collected as fees from government procedures such as court hearings and other document procedures.

Taxes were collected in forms of commodities or currency money. Main spending of the royal court went to the Biawat or the stipends of all administrative officials and the construction of palaces and temples and firearm purchases. In the early decades of Rattanakosin, the financial situation of the royal court was in strain. In 1796, Prince Maha Sura Singahanat of the Front Palace, who received 1,000 chang annually, informed King Rama I that his share was inadequate to be distributed as Biawat to his officials. King Rama I replied that the prince should invest more in the Royal Junks to earn money. King Rama I conducted his personal trade with Qing China through the Samphao Luang (สำเภาหลวง) or Royal Junks, in joint venture with Chinese merchants who provided the crew. Export demands on Siam had been mainly forest products such as agarwood and sappanwood. The royal court acquired valuable products from the hinterland and loaded them on the junks to be traded. Chinese merchants enhanced this process by taking the role as middlemen and shippers.

Qing China had been the main trading partner of Siam since the late Ayutthaya period. In the early nineteenth century, Qing China requested to buy rice from Siam. Traditionally, rice was the forbidden commodity due to the fact that it was the main staple and crucial to stability of the kingdom. King Rama II allowed rice to be exported to China in some rice-surplus years. Chinese settler merchants played very important roles in the development of Siamese economy in the early Rattanakosin period. In the 1810s, the Chinese introduced the technology of sugar production leading to the establishment of numerous Chinese-owned sugarcane plantations in Central Siam. Crawfurd mentioned the Chinese sugarcane plantations in ฺBang Pla Soi, Nakhon Chaisi, Bangkok and Petriu. In 1822, Siam exported more than 8 million pounds of sugar. For the first time, the export-oriented marketization took over native trade of forest products. However, the profits of these growing agro-industries were limited to the Chinese bourgeoisie and native elite class. The sugar industry remained as the major Siamese export well into the late nineteenth century.

=== Burney Treaty and consequences: 1826–1855 ===
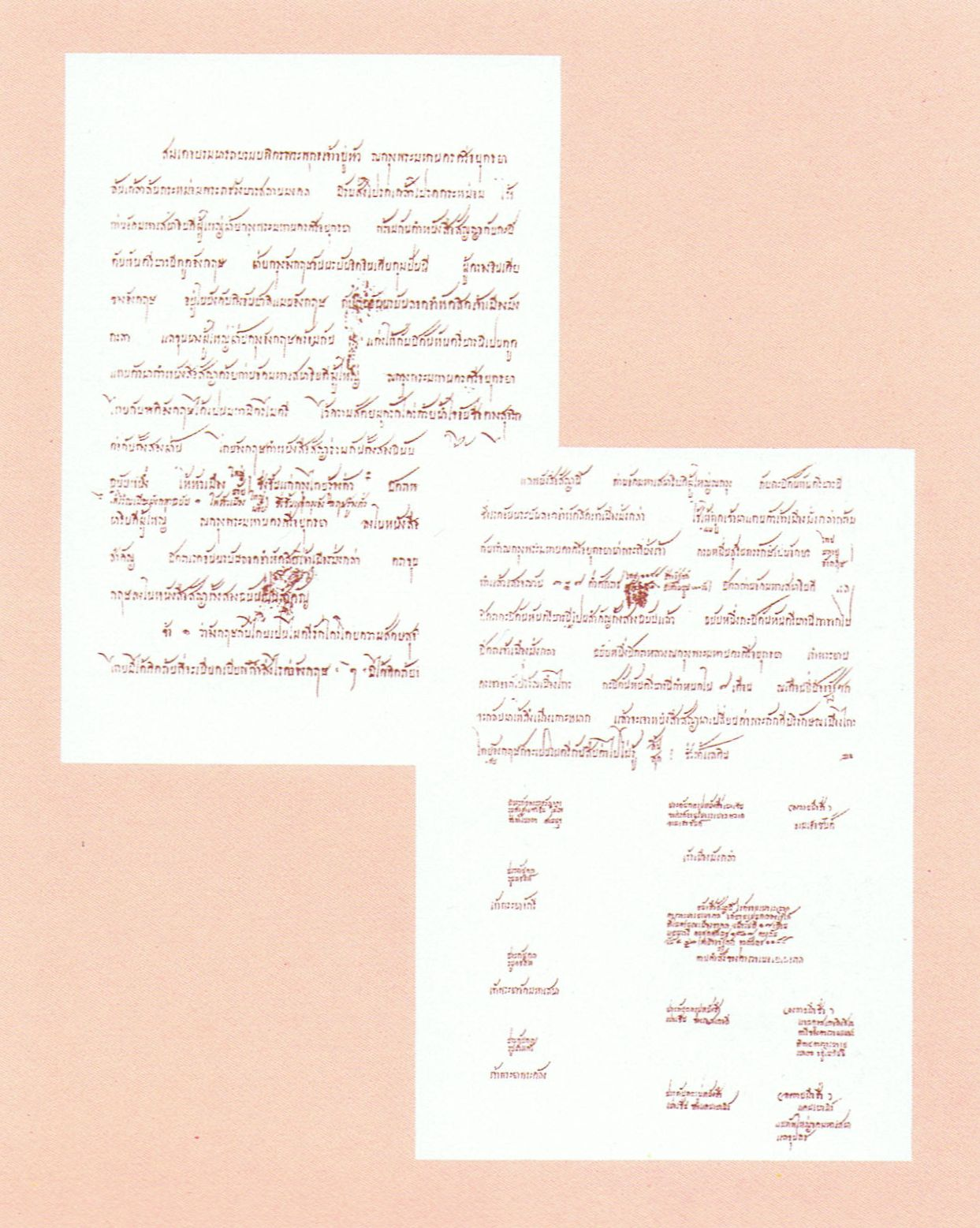
Thai duplicate of the Burney Treaty ratified in June 1826. The Burney Treaty ended three centuries of royal court monopoly on foreign trades by allowing the British to trade freely.

By the reign of King Rama II, however, the Samphao Luang or Royal Junks became less profitable due to competition with growing private sectors. Since the Ayutthaya period in the fifteenth century, the Siamese royal court had monopolized foreign trades through the Phra Khlang Sinkha (พระคลังสินค้า) or Royal Warehouse. All incoming foreign ships including European merchants should go through inspection by the Phra Khlang Sinkha and would subject to at least two duties; the general eight-percent tariff levied on merchandise goods and the Phasi Pak Reua or measurement duties that was based on the size of the ship. Crawfurd exemplified the situation in 1822 by narrating a commercial venture of British merchant brig Phoenix that brought goods from British India with the value of 24,282 ticals (121 million baht adjusted for inflation). Phoenix was subjected to multitudes of duties including 1,499-tical (7.5 million baht in today's money) measurement duties for ship size, 2,906 ticals (15 million baht in today's money) for import duties and 6,477 ticals (32 million baht in today's money) for export duties. These duties had been a major source of revenue for royal court. Moreover, Phra Khlang Sinkha would haggle and bargain for suppressed prices as foreign merchants could not trade 'restricted goods' directly with the private Siamese. Government-restricted goods in early nineteenth century included bird's nest, sappanwood, tin, peppers, timber, Malabar cardamom, lead, ivory and Hanbury's garcinia.

When the British arrived in the 1820s, they saw traditional royal monopoly as a hindrance and implied that free trade should be the better agreement. This culminated in the arrival of Henry Burney and the promulgation of the Burney Treaty in June 1826, which ended three centuries of royal monopoly by granting the rights to the British to trade privately. However, some trade restrictions remained. Rice and ammunition were not permitted to be traded freely and British merchandise ships were still required to go through the Phra Khlang Sinkha for the measurement duties imposition.

King Rama III, who ascended the throne in 1824, faced major financial problems. The Burney Treaty of 1826, which terminated royal trade monopoly, took drastic effect on the royal court revenue. King Rama III then realized that, instead of relying on the Royal Junks, the royal court should rather invest in tax farming. In his reign, thirty-eight new taxes were enacted to compensate the revenue loss. New tax farms required experienced collectors and the Chinese eagerly filled in these roles, leading to the creation of 'Chinese tax collector system'. When a new tax was announced, the Chinese merchants would compete for the rights to collect the tax on behalf of royal court. Those who promised highest amount of income would win this 'tax auction'. The granted Chinese tax collectors had to periodically pay the amount pledged to the royal court. Deprived government revenues and decline in Chinese tributary trade in the 1840s pushed Siamese court towards more isolationist and conservative policies. Chinese tax farming system re-imposed restrictions and tariffs on most trades. British delegate Sir James Brooke, who argued that the Burney Treaty had not been honored by Siam, arrived in Bangkok in 1850 to find the Siamese court opposing any further concessions. In 1850, few years prior to the Bowring Treaty, Siam's total export value was around 5.6 million baht (28 billion baht in today's money), with more than fifty percent came from natural products and fifteen percent from sugar export.

=== Bowring Treaty and consequences: 1855–1873 ===
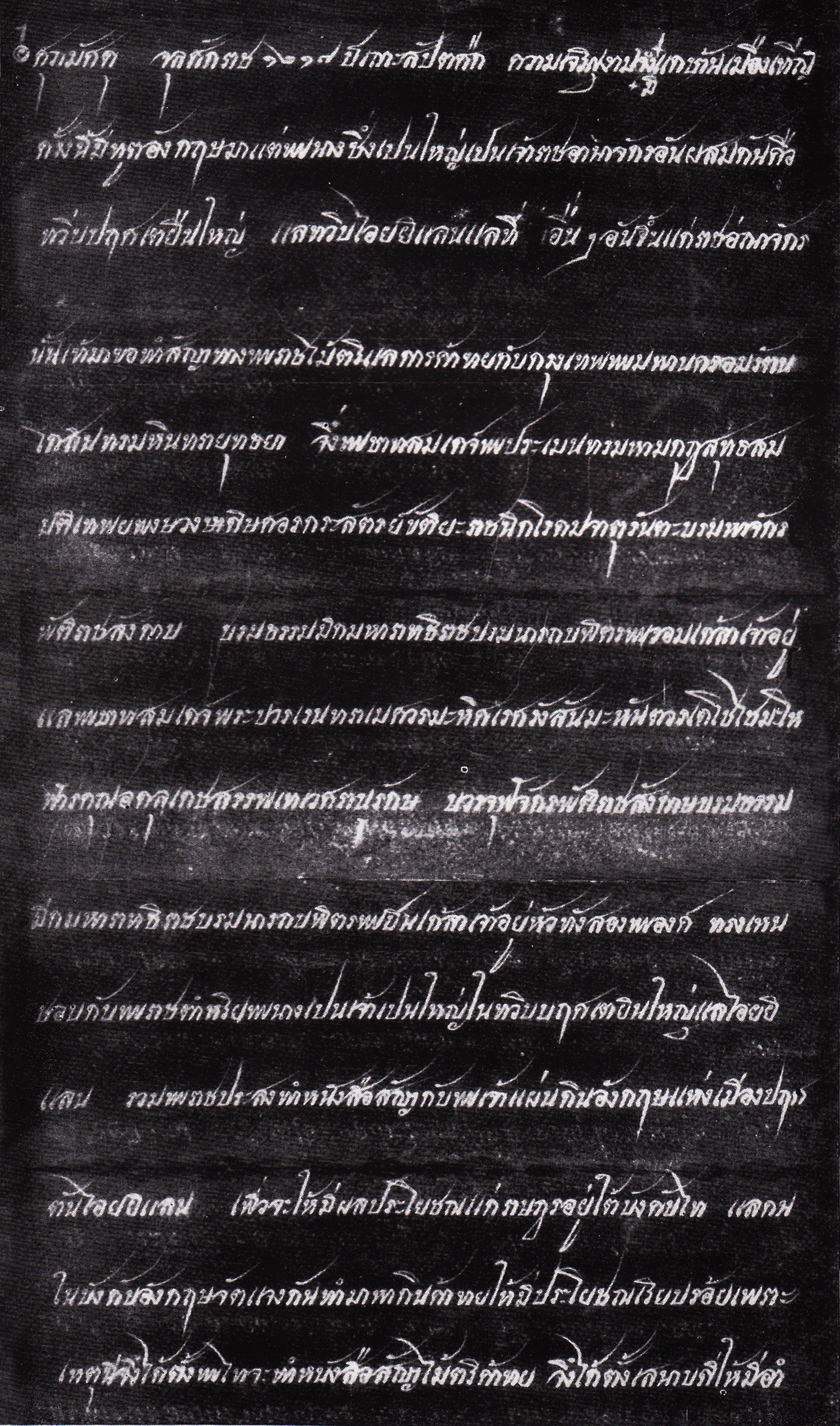
Thai version of the Bowring Treaty of 1855 on traditional Thai black book

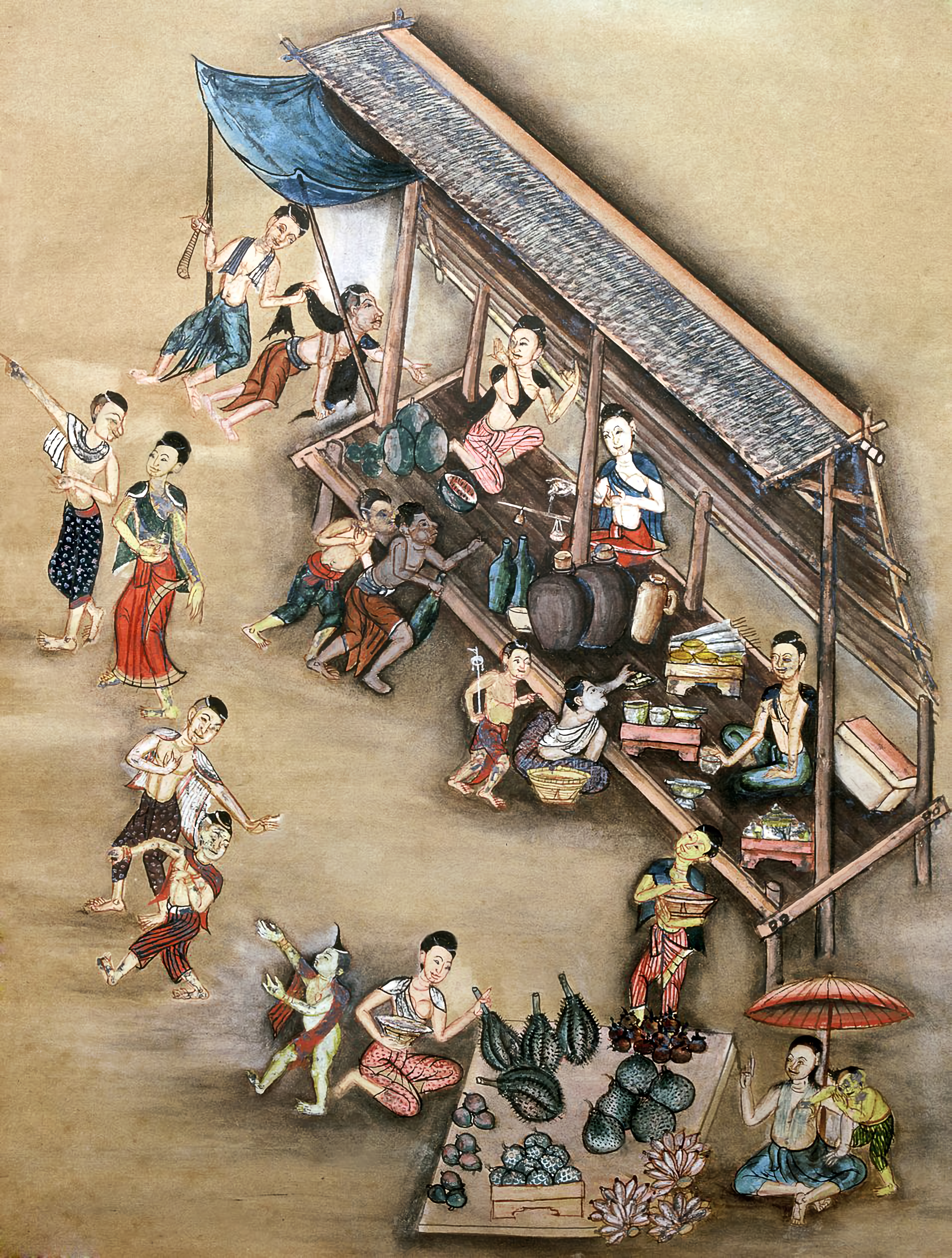
Market scene, Thai folk painting

Facing geopolitical pressures, Siamese government under liberal-minded King Mongkut and Chaophraya Si Suriyawong (Chuang Bunnag) gave in to British demands with the signing of Bowring Treaty in 1855. General import tariff was reduced and fixed at three percent ad valorem, which was lower than other Asian states including China's five percent and Japan's five percent, on all items except for opium and bullion. Phasi Pak Ruea or measurement duties, which was based on ship size, was abolished and incoming merchant ships were levied for duties only once along the course of trade venture, whether import or export. The rice export, which had been previously restricted due to concerns of national security, was liberalized.

Revolutionary effect of Bowring Treaty was that Siamese economy was liberalized as never been before, shifting away from traditional subsistence to export-oriented economy, expanded in market volume and integrated into world economy. Rice arose to become the top export commodity, leading to rapid expansion of rice fields in Central Siam. Siam exported 60,000 tons of rice in 1857 and became one of the world's leading rice exporters in the 1860s as rice was mostly shipped to Hong Kong and Singapore. Increasing rice export put the raise on incentives of rice producers who worked more lands and produced more crop than that was simply to feed themselves. Another effect was the beginning of disparity of wealth between Central Siam and inner hinterlands when Central Siam flourished from new economies but the hinterlands, which had earlier depended on forest product trade through Central Siam, declined. Bowring Treaty also forced decriminalization of opium, which had been outlawed since 1809, in Siam.

Trade agreements of Bowring Treaty and other 'unequal treaties' with Western nations also took detrimental effects on Siamese government revenues. Traditional trade tariffs was sacrificed in order to preserve the kingdom's security in regards of colonial threats. This put Siamese government in dire financial situation even in the time that Siam's economy was expanding and led to creation of fourteen even more tax farms in the reign of King Mongkut for Chinese collectors to levy. Numerous and disorganized taxes were scattered across many departments, which were under control of nobility who benefitted from their tax collection responsibilities. Largest taxes, opium tax and alcohol tax, belonged to the Bunnag-led Kalahom and Kromma Tha. Nobles responsible for tax collection treated tax farms under their control as their own properties and sought to limit their payment to government treasury at fixed rate. Government revenues were not effectively harnessed from this deranged taxation system and led to fiscal reforms by King Chulalongkorn in 1873.

=== Fiscal Reforms: 1873–1893 ===
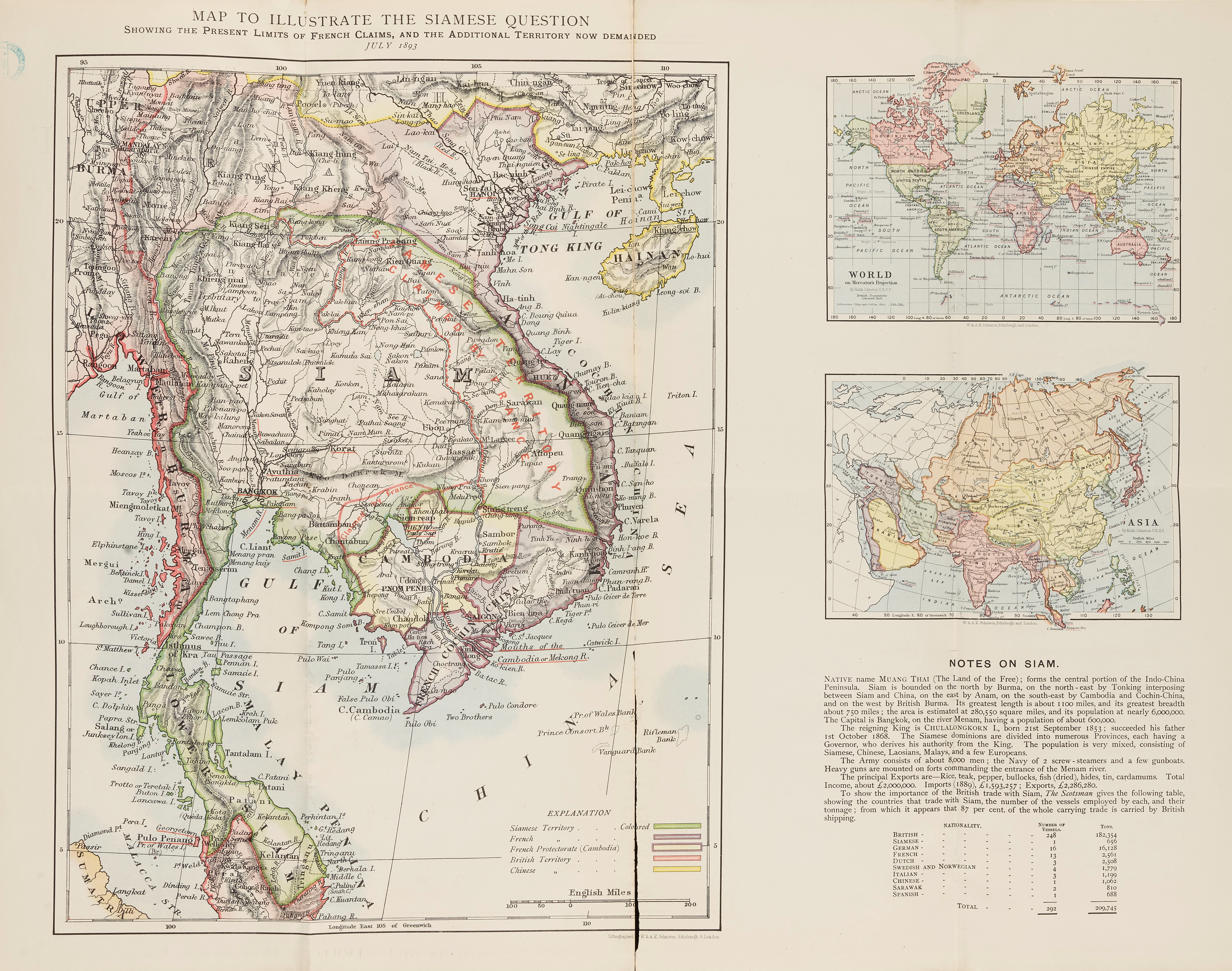
Siamese question territory map 1893 French claims

When King Chulalongkorn ascended the throne in 1868, he was under regency of the powerful Bunnag minister Chaophraya Si Suriyawong. Siamese state taxation had been relying on the Chinese tax collectors who were, in theory, obliged to fulfill their pledges to the government by paying the promised tax levy amount they had been leased to. However, these Chinese tax collectors were also entrepreneurs and usually did not fulfill their payments as they spent the levied tax money on their own private investments. The Chinese tax collectors were appointed with Siamese noble titles and possessed private armies in order to enforce their tax levies, treating their tax farms as their own fiefdoms. Tax farms were scattered among many administrative departments including the Kalahom and the Phrakhlang, which were under the Bunnag ministers, to which the Chinese tax farmers made their payments. Bidding for tax farms were limited to certain influential Chinese entrepreneurs and syndicates. The overseeing ministers also treated their tax farms as their own personal properties and did not send all of the levied tax money to royal and state treasuries. During 1868–1873, Siamese royal state revenue fell from 4.8 million baht (24 billion adjusted to inflation) to 1.6 million baht (8 billion adjusted to inflation) a year.

Upon his assumption of personal rule in 1873, King Chulalongkorn was determined to reform this ineffective taxation system plagued by corruption of the said tax officials. Chulalongkorn established Ho Ratsadakorn Phiphat (หอรัษฎากรพิพัฒน์) or Financial Auditory Office in June 1873 that took over the kingdom's tax levy. This new administrative body took control over the Chinese tax farmers, making sure that they paid in full amount directly to royal state treasury, bypassing the Bunnag ministers and also that tax farm biddings were to be fair. Chulalongkorn's fiscal reforms was also a political movement against the powerful conservative Bunnag faction in his efforts to centralize state treasury and to consolidate royal powers. Chulalongkorn's reforms apparently conflicted with the opposing faction, whose benefits relied upon the old system. After the Front Palace Crisis in late 1874, Chulalongkorn chose to stall further reforms in order to avoid political confrontations. Chulalongkorn established modern Finance Department in April 1875 that oversaw the finance and taxation of the kingdom, dividing the traditional Phraklang treasury department into Finance and Foreign Affair departments.

In spite of the fiscal reforms, the kingdom still relied on the Chinese tax collectors-farmers as the state lacked financial knowledge and adequate personnel to effectively collect its own taxes. In 1890, King Chulalongkorn elevated the Finance Department to the Ministry of Finance. King Chulalongkorn abolished the Chinese tax collector system in 1892, allowing the Siamese government to employ its own officials to directly collect taxes without leasing to private individuals.

In 1893, Siam had an estimated area of 280,550 square miles (726,600 km^{2}), and a population of 6,000,000. The capital of Bangkok had about 600,000 people. The population was very mixed consisting of Siamese, Chinese, Laotians, Malays and a few Europeans. The principal exports are: rice, teak, pepper, bullocks, fish (dried), hides, tin, cardamoms. Total income was about £2 million, imports (1889) £1.593.257; exports £2.286,280. According to The Scotsman, 87% of the vessels carrying trade to and from Siam was done by British ships.

Ships carrying trade
Nationality	Number of vessels	Tons
British	248	182,354
Siamese	1	656
German	16	16,128
French	13	2561
Dutch	3	2508
Swedish and Norwegian	4	1779
Italian	3	1199
Chinese	1	1062
Sarawak	2	810
Spanish	1	688
Total	292	209,745

=== Currency ===
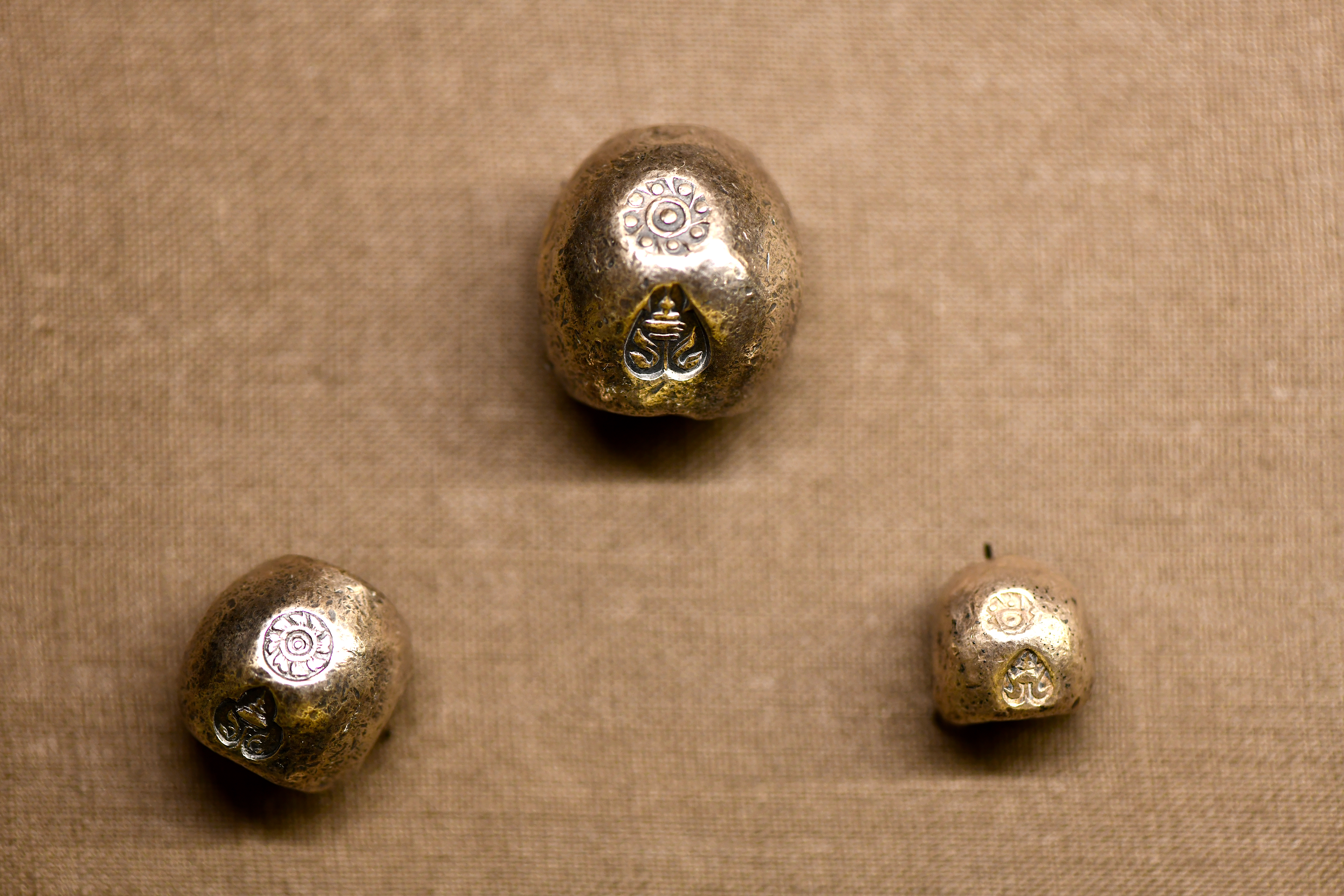
Photduang (lit. 'curled worm'), the silver bullet money of Siam with the Chakra seal of the kingdom imprinted on one side and the regal seal of the reign imprinted on the other side

Rattanakosin Kingdom used the silver bullet money known as photduang (พดด้วง) as currency until it was officially replaced with flat coins in 1904. Photduang originated in the Sukhothai period and had been in use through the Ayutthaya period. A silver bar was cut into discrete units of weight, which were melted and cast into strips that were bent to curve in the form of curled worms – hence the name photduang meaning 'curled worm'. Photduang bullet coins were imprinted with the Chakra seal, which was the kingdom seal, on one side and the regal seal of each reign on other side. King Rama I had the Unalom lotus seal imprinted on the photduang of his reign. King Rama II used the garuda seal. The seal of King Rama III was in the shape of a palace. The weight units of photduang were tamleung (ตำลึง, 60 g of silver), baht (บาท, 15 g), salueng (สลึง, quarter of baht), fueang (เฟื้อง, half of saleung) and phai (ไพ, quarter of fueang).

Different currencies were used in Lanna and Lao Kingdoms. In Laos, the lat silver bars were used. Photduang were also accepted in those regions.

Though photduang currency existed, the barter exchange remained prevalent. In the reign of King Rama II, the royal court distributed biawat stipends to government officials in the form of white clothes. Some taxes were collected in form of commodity products.

Before Bowring Treaty of 1855, most Siamese economic transactions were done through barter exchange. After Bowring, the Siamese economy expanded in scale and led to monetization of the economy. Cash in the forms of Mexican real, Dutch guilder, Indian rupee, Japanese and Vietnamese coins flooded into Siam. Siamese people were reluctant to switch to coin usage and stuck with their photduang. Foreign coins were melted and re-cast into photduang silver bullets. However, casting of photduang required craftsmanship and did not meet the demands of Siam's growing economy. Government had to declare foreign coins legal for usage inside Siam in 1857. During the Siamese mission to London in 1857, Queen Victoria gifted a coin-minting machine to Siamese court, leading to establishment of minting house in royal treasury department. ฺThree British engineers arrived in Siam with the machine in 1857 but all three of them died soon from fever, drowning and cholera, leaving the machine unoperated. King Mongkut then had to assign a native Siamese nobleman named Moed (โหมด) to learn the operation of the minting machine. First Siamese machine-minted coinage was issued in 1860. It took time for Siamese society to accept modern coin usage, and traditional photduang was used concurrently.

First circulating flat coin series issued (1862 issue); with adjusted for inflation value

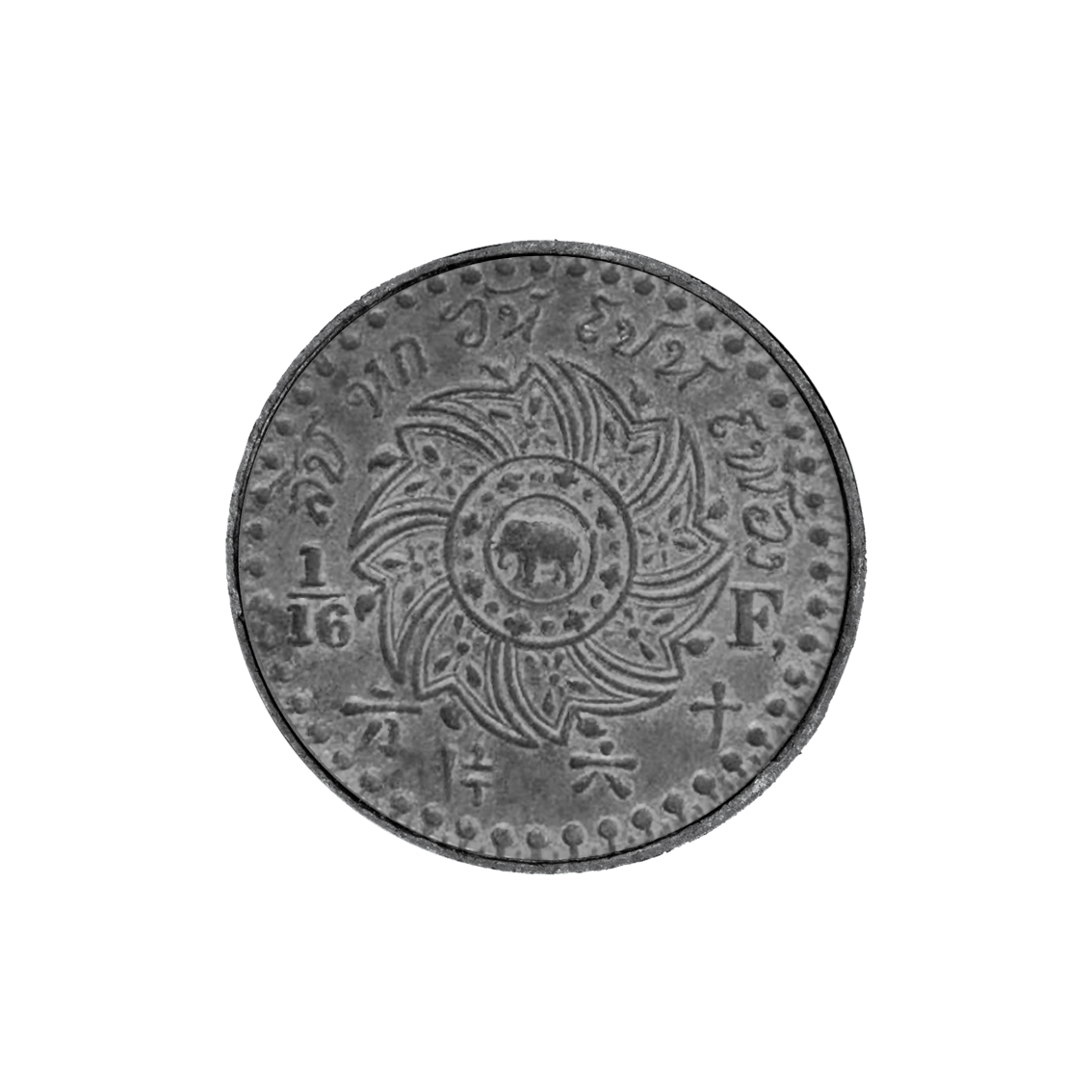
Solot(1/128 B.) 40 baht equiv.

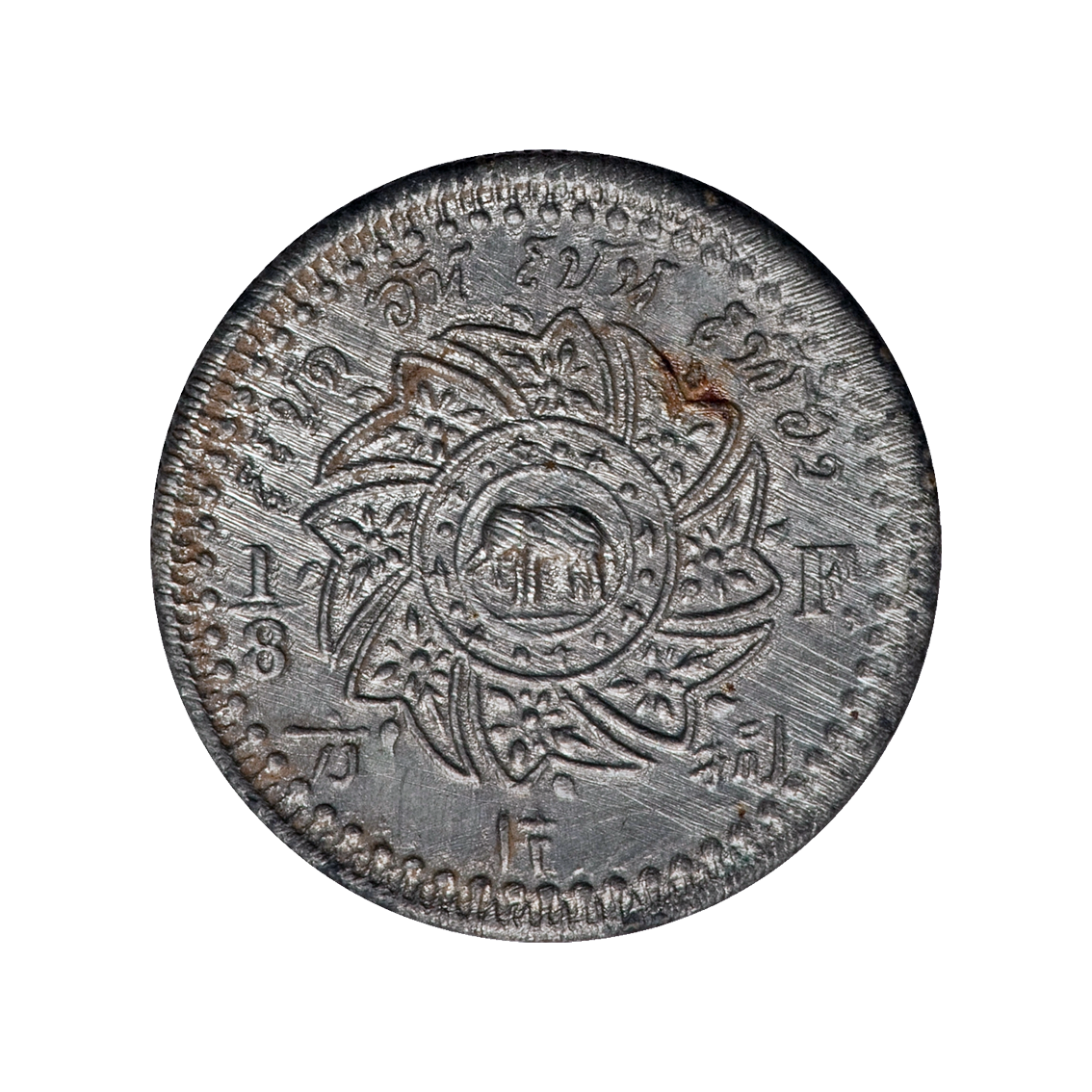
Att (1/64 B.) 80 baht equiv.

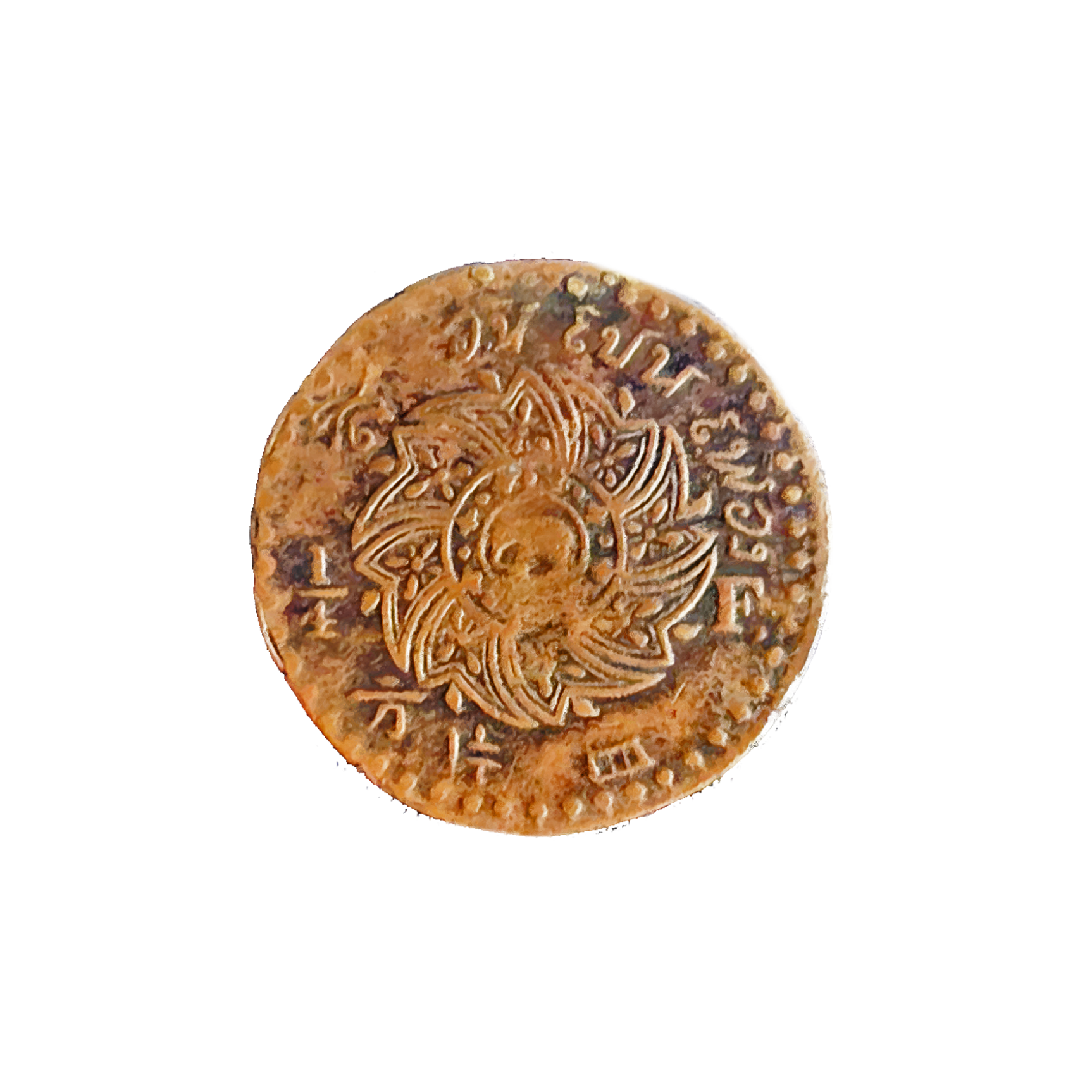
Siao (1/32 B.) 160 baht equiv.

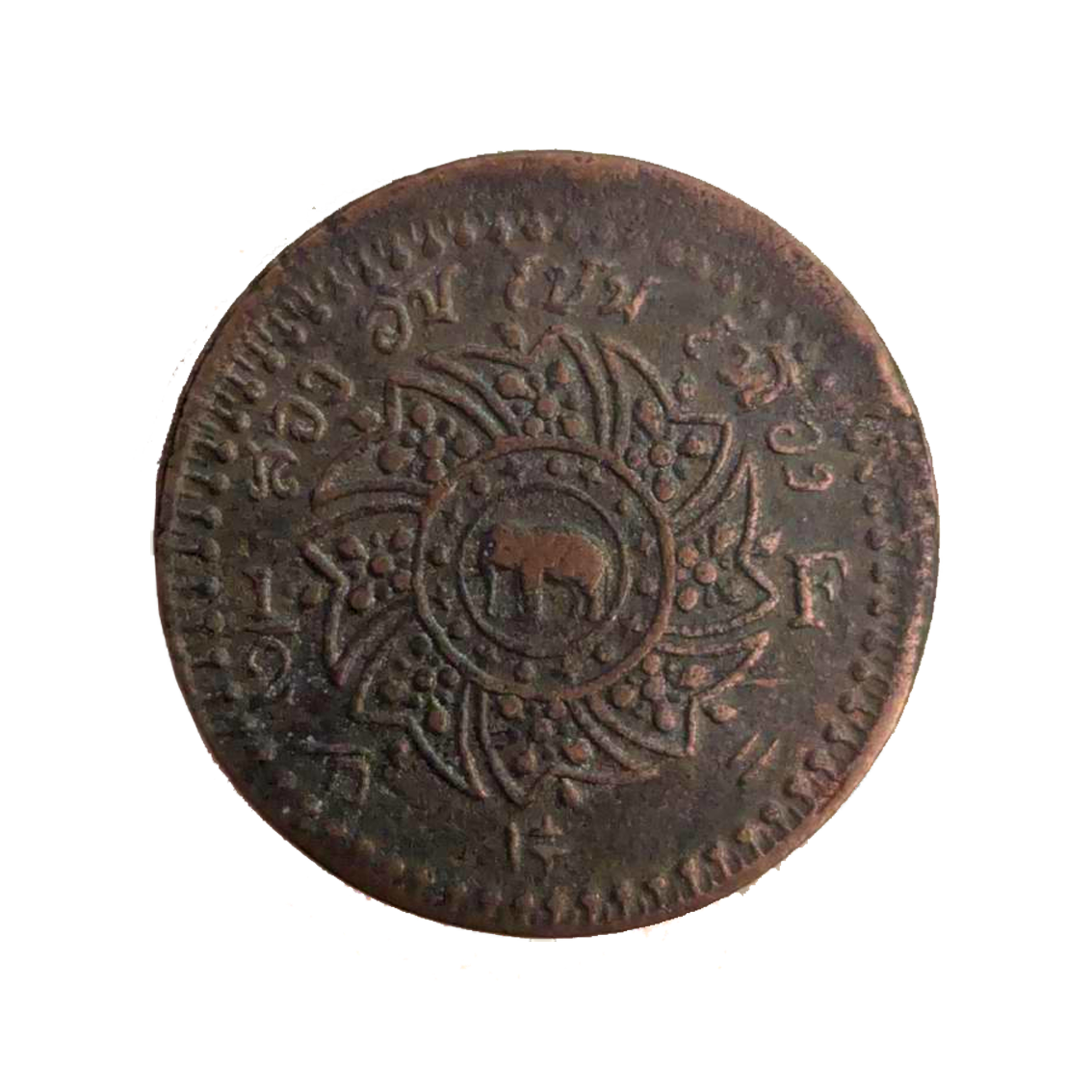
Sik (1/16 B.) 320 baht equiv.

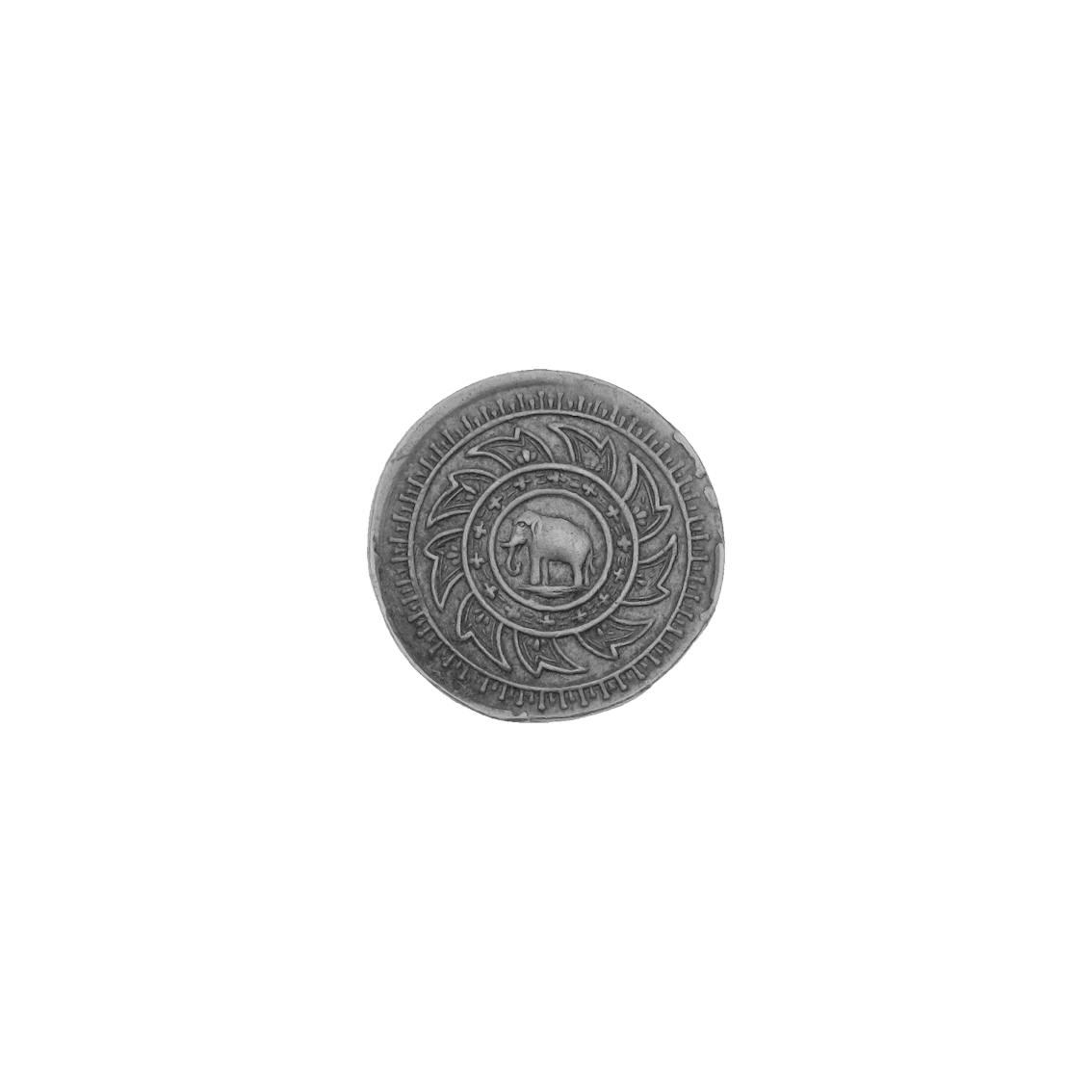
½Fuang (1/16 B.) 320 baht equiv.

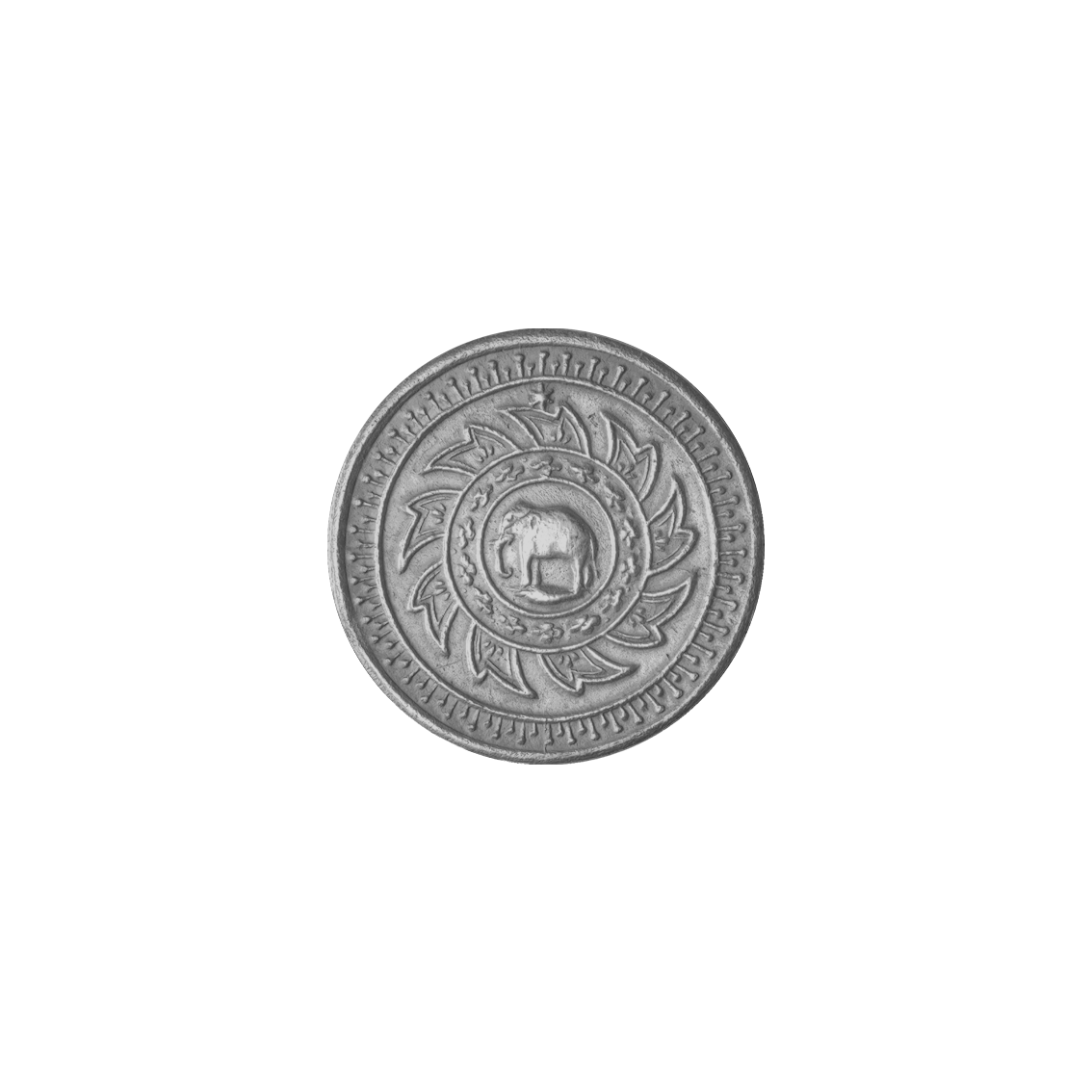
Fuang (1/8 B.) 640 baht equiv.

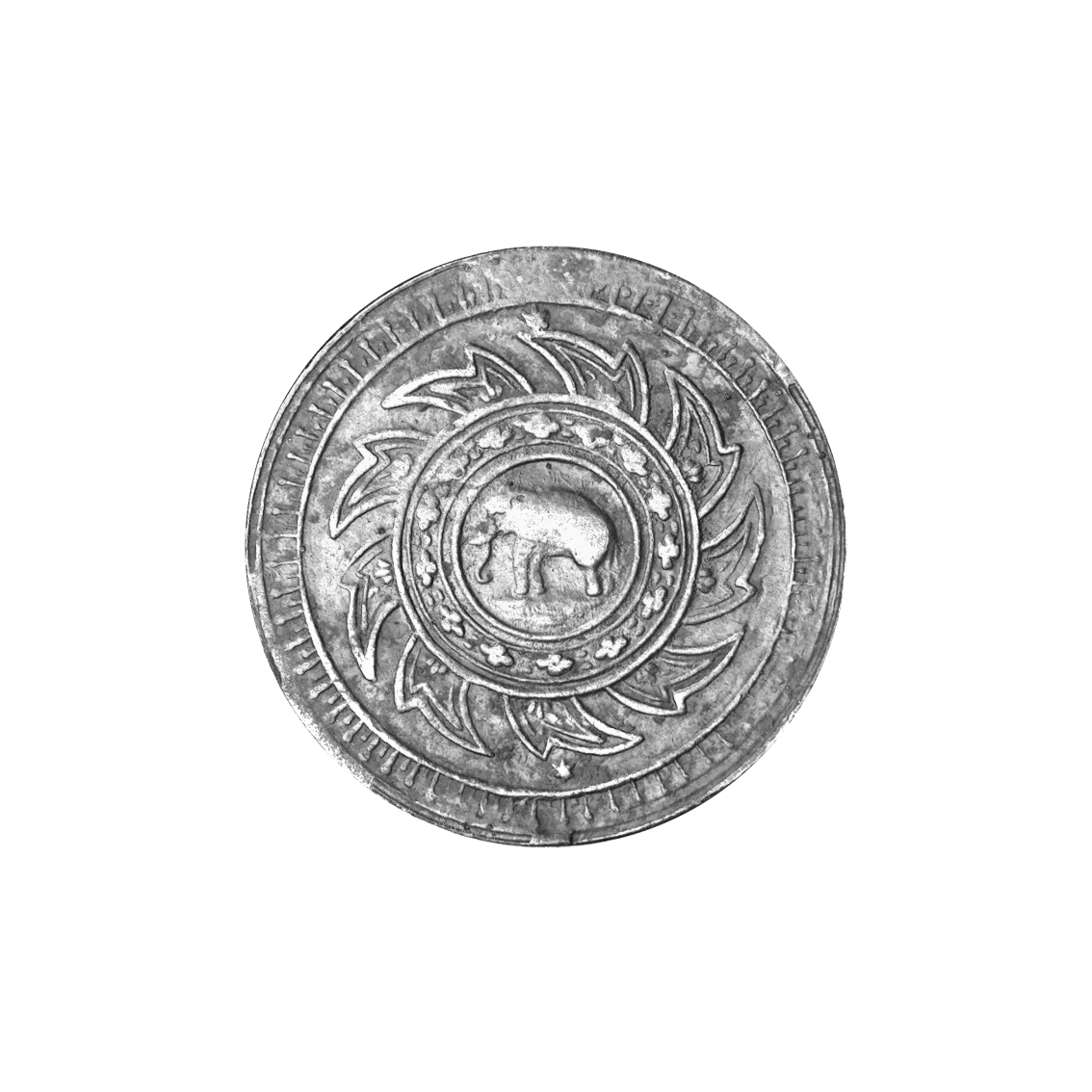
Salung (1/4 B.) 1,280 baht equiv.

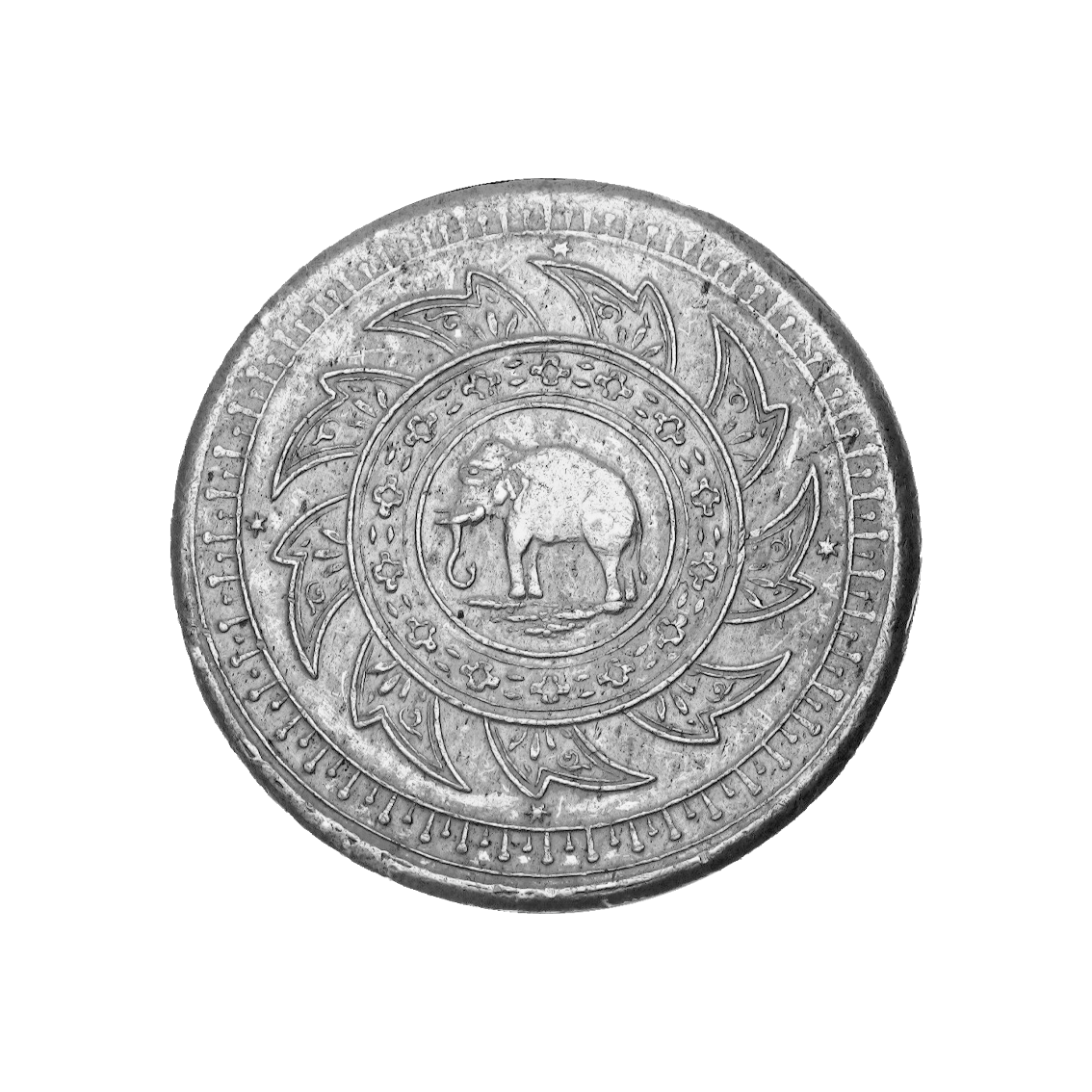
2 Salung (1/2 B.) 2,500 baht equiv.

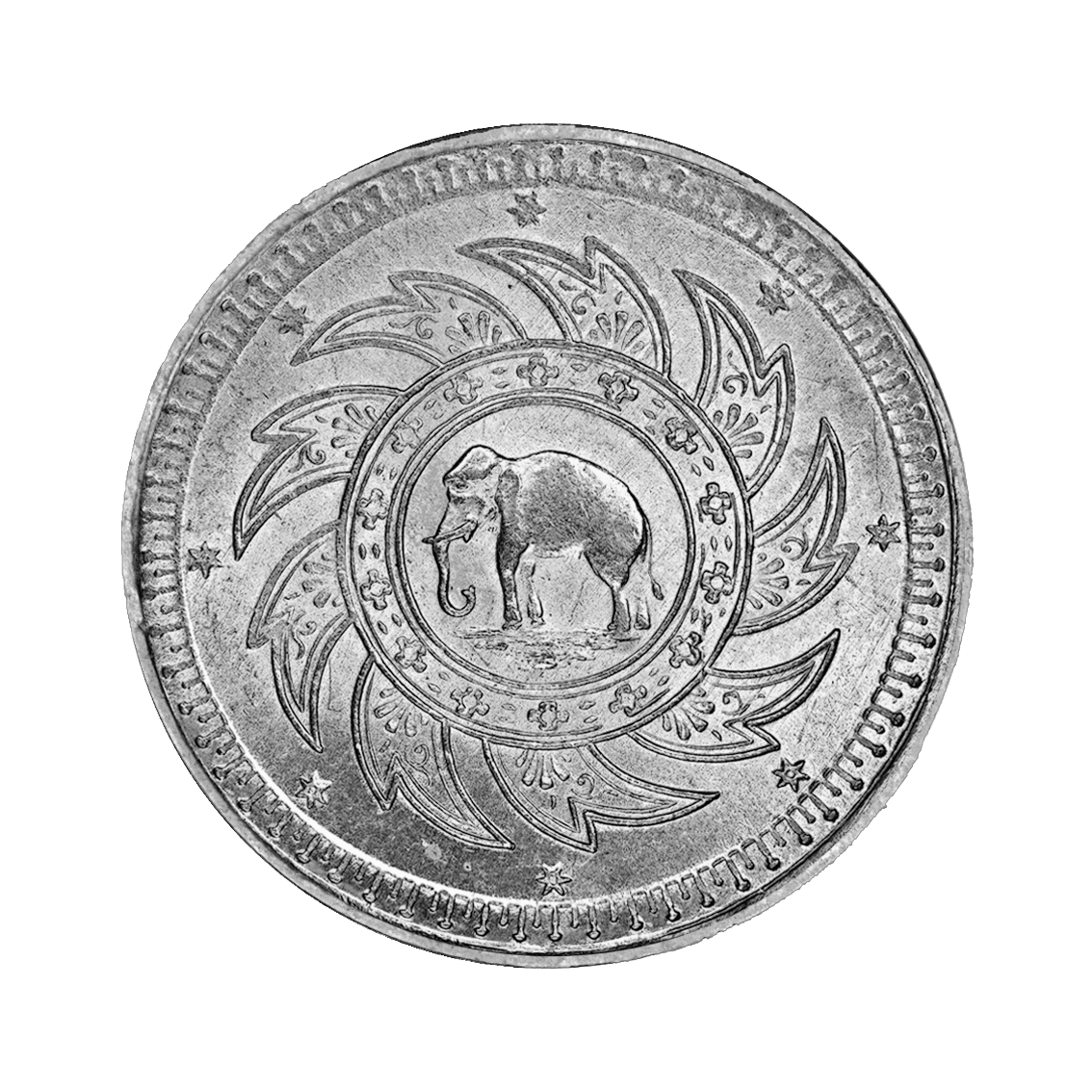
Baht 5,000 baht equiv.

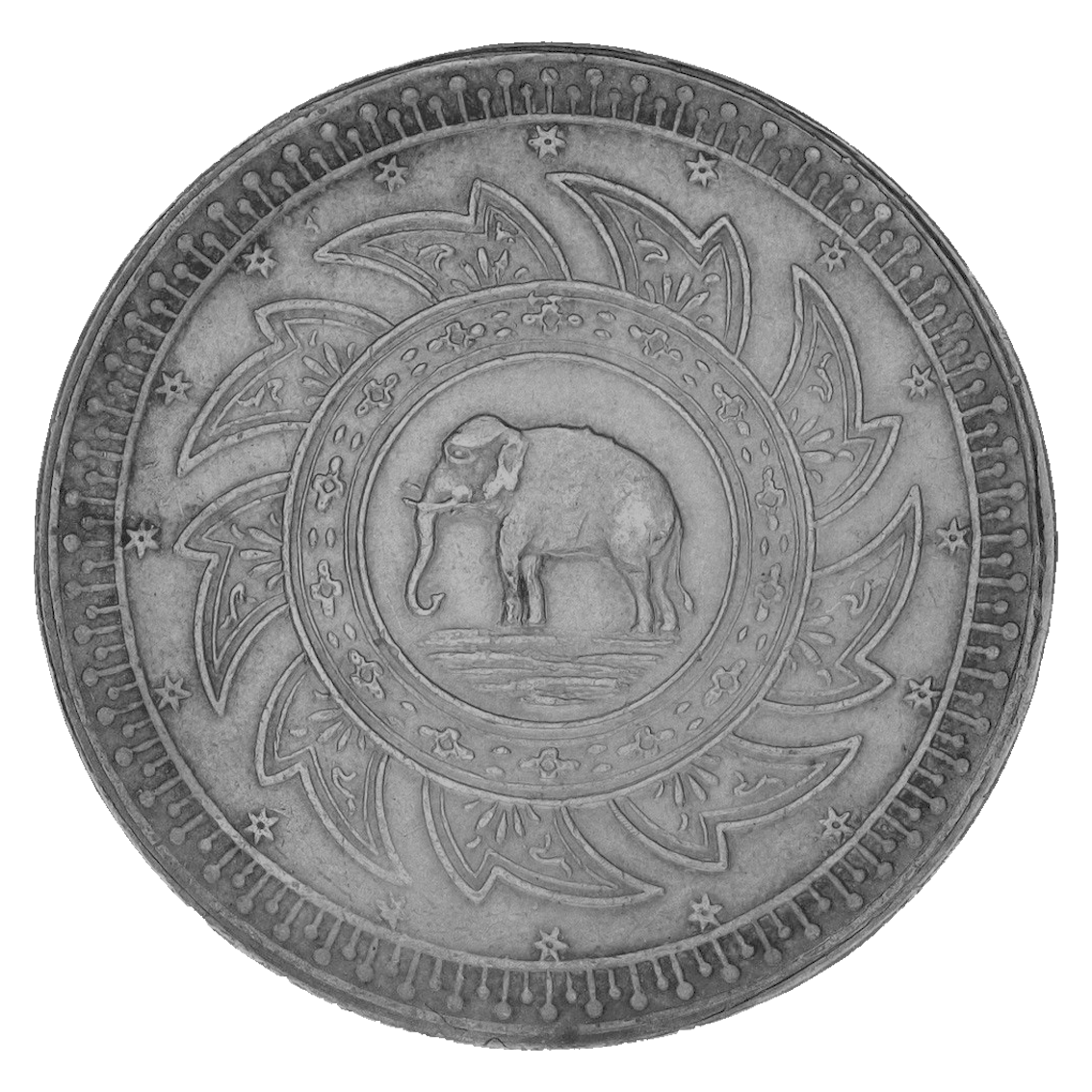
½Tamlung (2 B.) 10,000 baht equiv.

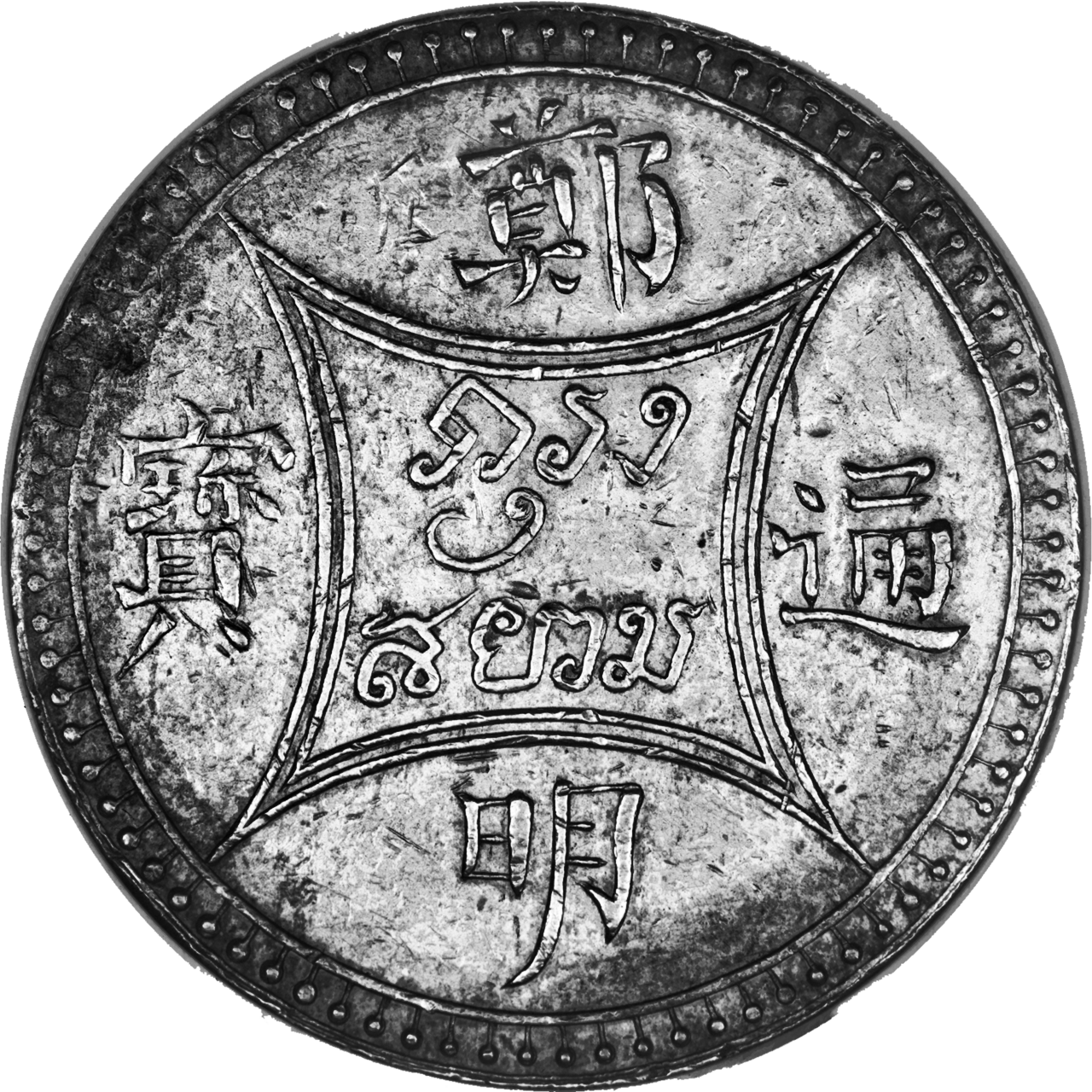
Tamlung (4 B.) 20,000 baht equiv.

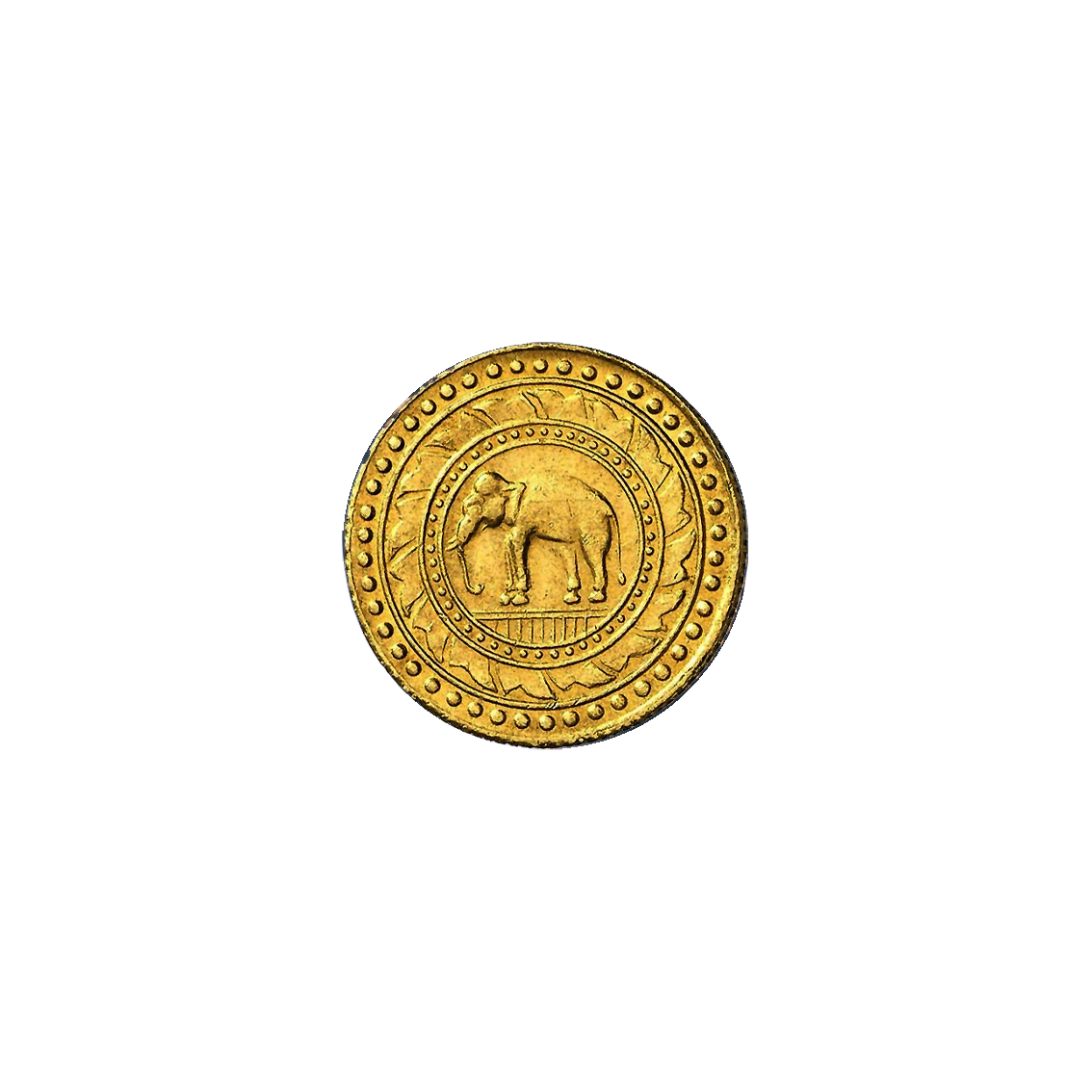
Paddung (2.5 B.) 12,500 baht equiv.

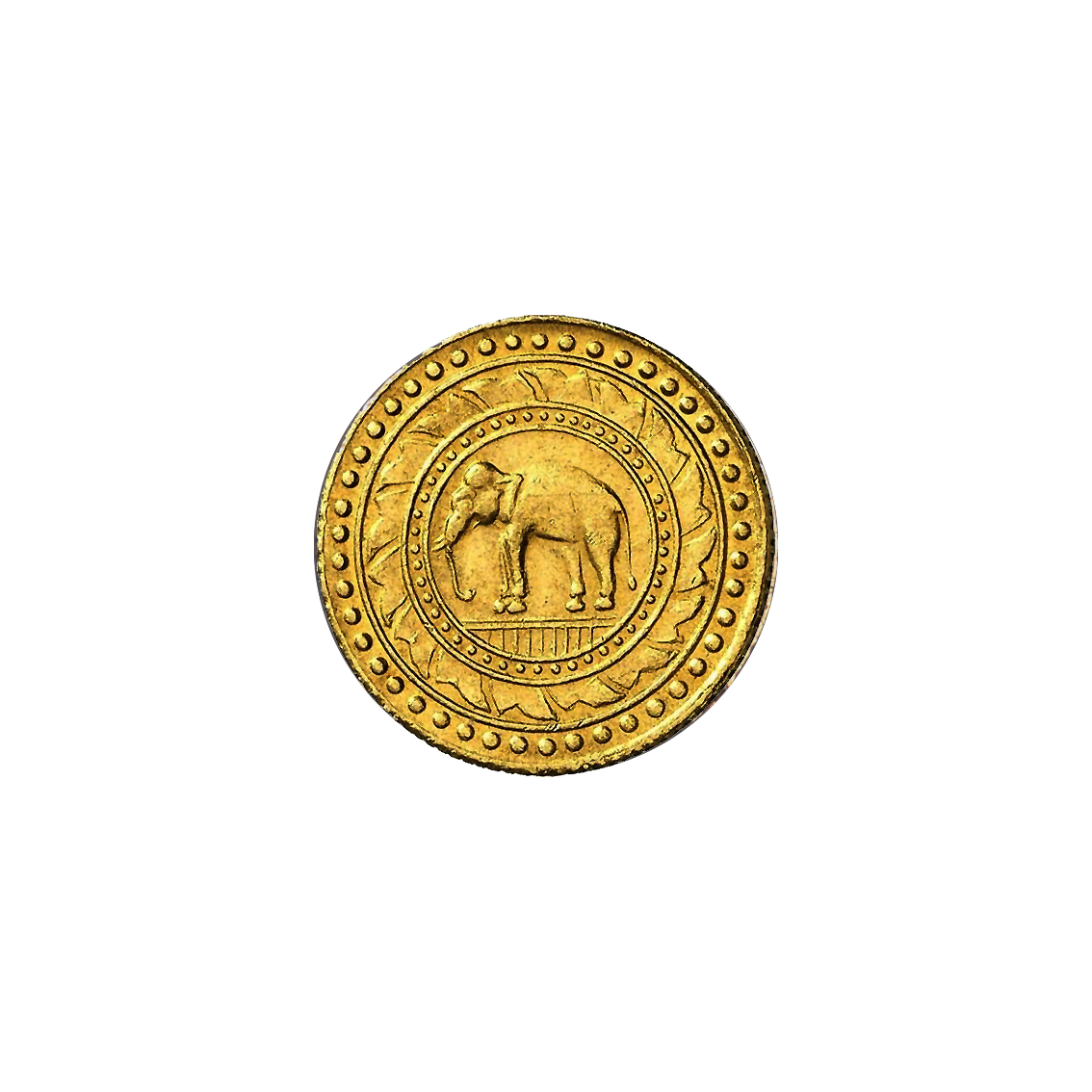
Pit (4 B.) 20,000 baht equiv.

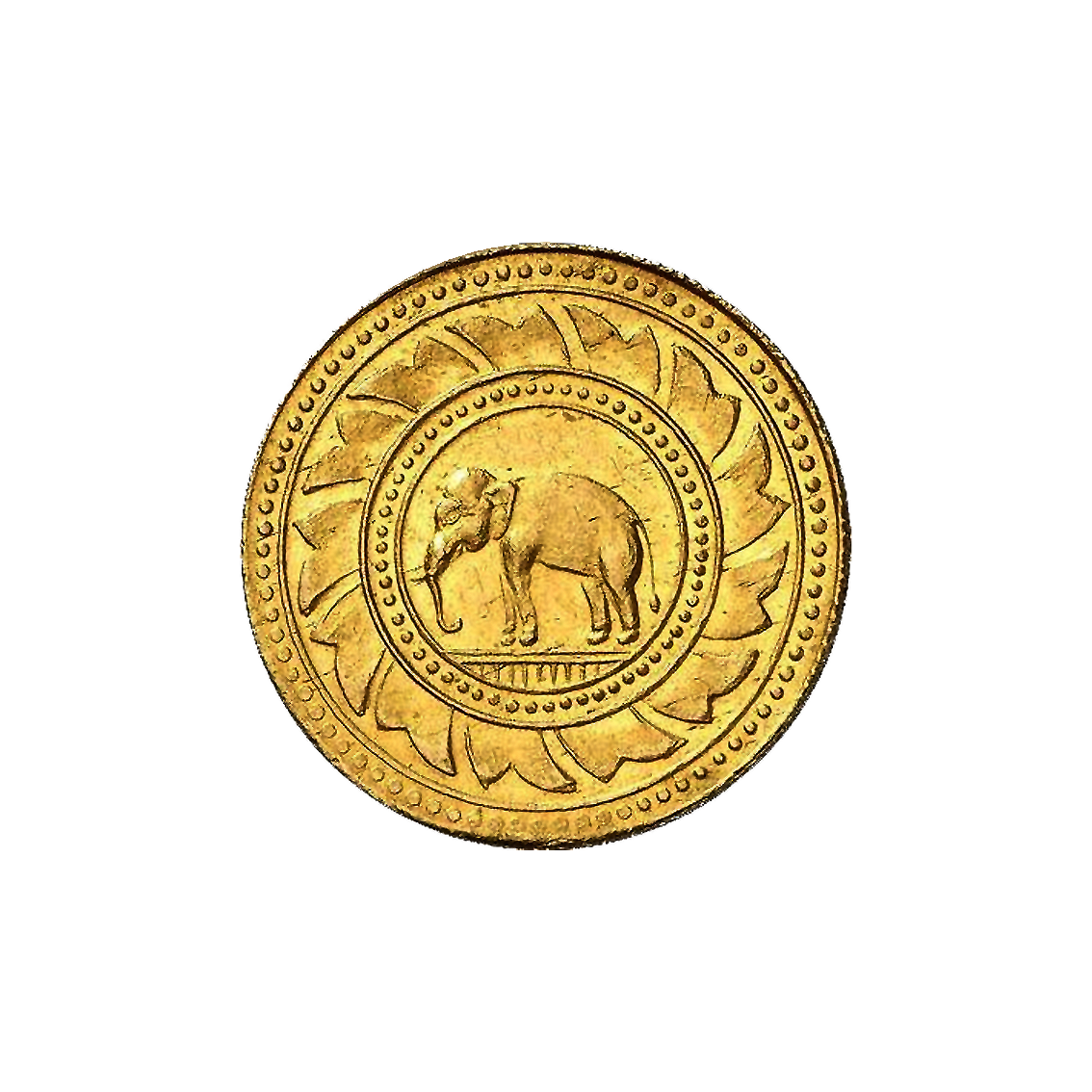
Tot (8 B.) 40',000 baht equiv.

== Diplomacy ==
=== Qing China ===
Siam had entered the Chinese tributary relationship system, in which the Chinese imperial court recognized the rulers of Siam to maintain relations, since Sukhothai and Ayutthaya periods. Siamese missions to the Chinese imperial court were called Chim Kong (進貢 POJ: chìn-kòng จิ้มก้อง "to offer gifts"). The Chinese Emperors conferred the Hong investitures (封 Peng'im: hong^{1} หอง) on Siamese monarchs as Siamlo Kok Ong (暹羅國王). Siamese kings did not consider themselves as submitted tributary rulers but rather as amicable gift exchangers, while the Chinese court would construe this as vassal homage from Siam. Entering the tributary relationship with China permitted the Siamese royal court to conduct lucrative commercial activities there. The Siamese court presented commodities ascribed by the imperial court as tributes to the Chinese Emperor who, in return, granted luxurious goods, which were more valuable than Siamese presented goods, in exchange. The Siamese mission to China was a profitable expenditure in itself in the view of Siamese royal court. The tributary relation with China did not have political implications in Siam as the Beijing court wielded little to no influence over Siam.

Kings of the Chakri dynasty of the early Rattanakosin period continued the tradition of Chim Kong. King Taksin of Thonburi had been in difficulties gaining recognition from the Chinese imperial court due to Emperor Qianlong telling Taksin to restore the Ayutthayan dynasty instead of establishing himself as king. Later the Qing court took more positive view on Taksin, who managed to send a diplomatic tributary mission to Beijing in 1781. The Chinese imperial court was informed that the new Siamese king Rama I was a son of Taksin so the new royal court of Bangkok was officially recognized and the king was invested title by the Qing court in 1787. Siam sent tributes to China once every three years. The Chakri kings used the family name "Zheng" (鄭), which was the family name of King Taksin, in diplomatic letters to China. Chinese imperial court granted the Lokto Seal (駱駝 โลโต) to the Siamese king in recognition. The jaded Lokto Seal bore Chinese letters Siamlo Kok Ong with the handle sculpted in the shape of camel. On each mission, the Siamese envoys presented three letters to the Chinese court;

- The royal letter to the Chinese Emperor inscribed on a golden plate
- The Khamhap (勘合 คำหับ) letter bearing the Lokto Seal and Siamese Royal Seal
- The letter from Phrakhlang the Minister of Trade with the Lotus Seal of Ministry of Trade and the Royal Seal

The Lokto Seal served as confirmation of validity of the Siamese mission. Siamese envoys to China were hailed from the Kromma Tha Sai (กรมท่าซ้าย 'Department of the Left Pier') that dealt with Chinese affairs and were usually Chinese-speakers themselves. The mission consisted of three dignitaries; the First Envoy Rachathut, the Second Envoy Upathut, the Third Envoy Trithut and two translators; Thongsue and Pansue. The Siamese mission took maritime journey to Guangzhou, where Chinese officials verified the Lokto. The Siamese mission then proceeded by land to Beijing.

By the 1830s, the Chinese junk trades declined. In 1839, Emperor Daoguang ordered Siam to send tributes once every four years instead of three years. The Treaty of Nanking of 1842, in the aftermath of First Opium War, abolished the Canton system and the British took over maritime trade in Asia. The Sino-Siamese trades shifted from junk trades based on the Chim Kong to the free trades using British cargoes. Upon his ascension, King Mongkut dispatched a Chim Kong mission to China in 1851. The mission was rejected at Guangzhou on the grounds that Emperor Xienfeng was in mourning for his father Emperor Daoguang. Another mission was re-dispatched in 1852. However, the mission was robbed by local Chinese bandits and the Pansue translator was killed. King Mongkut then asserted that the Chim Kong tradition might give misguided impression that Siam had been under political suzerainty of China and was inappropriate for an independent sovereign kingdom to conduct. King Mongkut then ordered the Chim Kong to be discontinued in 1863. The Chim Kong of 1852 was the last Siamese tribute mission to China in history.

=== British Empire ===
==== Early contacts ====
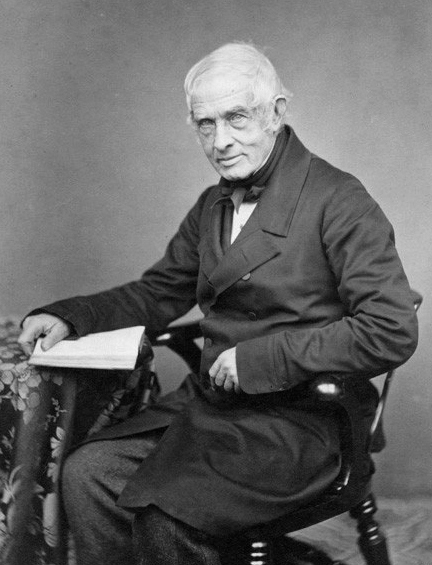
John Crawfurd, a Scottish diplomat, was the leader of British mission to Siam in 1822, which was the first official contact between Siam and British Empire in Rattanakosin period.

In 1785, the Sultan of Kedah ceded Penang Island to the British East India Company in exchange for British military protection against Siam. Kedah had stopped sending tribute to the Siamese court since the dissolution of the Ayutthaya Kingdom in 1767. Following the ascension of the Chakri dynasty, Siam demanded the resumption of tributary missions from the Sultanate of Kedah. When the Siamese army was at the doorstep of Kedah, the British refused to assist the Kedah Sultanate, arguing that the treaty made with the Sultan was between the Sultan and Francis Light, not the East India Company. The Kedah Sultanate attempted to retake Penang but failed, resulting in the official handover of Penang to the British in 1791. In 1800, Seberang Perai (Province Wellesley) was ceded to Britain. The French Revolutionary Wars and Napoleonic Wars delayed official British contact with Siam for another twenty years.

In 1821, Marquess of Hastings the Governor-General of India sent John Crawfurd to Siam. Also in 1821, Phraya Nakhon Noi the "Raja of Ligor" invaded and occupied the sultanate of Kedah resulting in Sultan Ahmad Tajuddin Halim Shah taking refuge in the British-held Penang. The British at Penang were concerning about Siamese presence in Kedah when Crawfurd arrived on the island in 1822. Crawfurd arrived in Bangkok in 1822. There was no English translators in Siamese court so the British messages were translated into Portuguese then into Malay and into Thai. Crawfurd proposed tariff reduction. Phraya Phrakhlang (Dit Bunnag) asked to acquire firearms for Siam. Crawfurd, however, said that the British would sell firearms on conditions that Siam "were at peace with the friends and neighbours of the British nation", indirectly referring to Burma. Siamese court, whose main concern in dealings with Western powers was to purchase firearms to be used in Burmese Wars, were dissatisfied. The final straw came when Crawfurd delivered the personal letter of the Kedah sultan to King Rama II, complaining Nakhon Noi as the source of his discontents. The negotiations were effectively soured. Crawfurd eventually departed for Saigon later that year.

Despite the events during his mission in 1822, Crawfurd remained in contact with the Siamese court as the Resident of Singapore. In the First Anglo-Burmese War in 1824, Crawfurd informed Siam that the British Empire was at war with Burma and requested Siamese aid. King Rama III then assigned Siamese troops led by the Mon commander Chaophraya Mahayotha to assist the British in Tenasserim Region. However, the 'Mergui Incident' in 1825, in which Siamese and British commanders argued over the deportation of people of Mergui, prompted King Rama III to withdraw all troops from Burma. Lord Amherst then sent Henry Burney to Bangkok in 1825. Henry Burney arrived at Ligor where he was escorted by Nakhon Noi to Bangkok in 1826. Agreements were reached and the Burney Treaty was signed in June 1826. Burney Treaty ended traditional Siamese royal court monopoly by allowing the British to trade freely and privately, in which the British accepted of Siamese domination over Kedah.

The Burney Treaty also offered the British some disadvantages. The British in Siam, who were horrified by the Nakhonban methods of judiciary tortures, were still subjected to Siamese laws and court. The infamous Phasi Pak Reua or the measurement duties were still intact. After the First Opium War in 1842, the British came to dominate maritime trade in Asia and the British pushed for more free trades. Siamese court introduced the Chinese tax collector system, in which Chinese merchants would 'auction' for new commodity taxes and levy the taxes on behalf of government. This new taxation system effectively re-imposed trade barriers in the 1840s. James Brooke the governor of Labuan arrived in 1850 to amend agreements. However, his proposals were vehemently rejected by Siamese trade officials. Brooke even suggested gunboat diplomacy but eventually left empty-handed. It was not until the Bowring Treaty of 1855 that the British rhetorical demands were achieved.

==== Post-Bowring ====
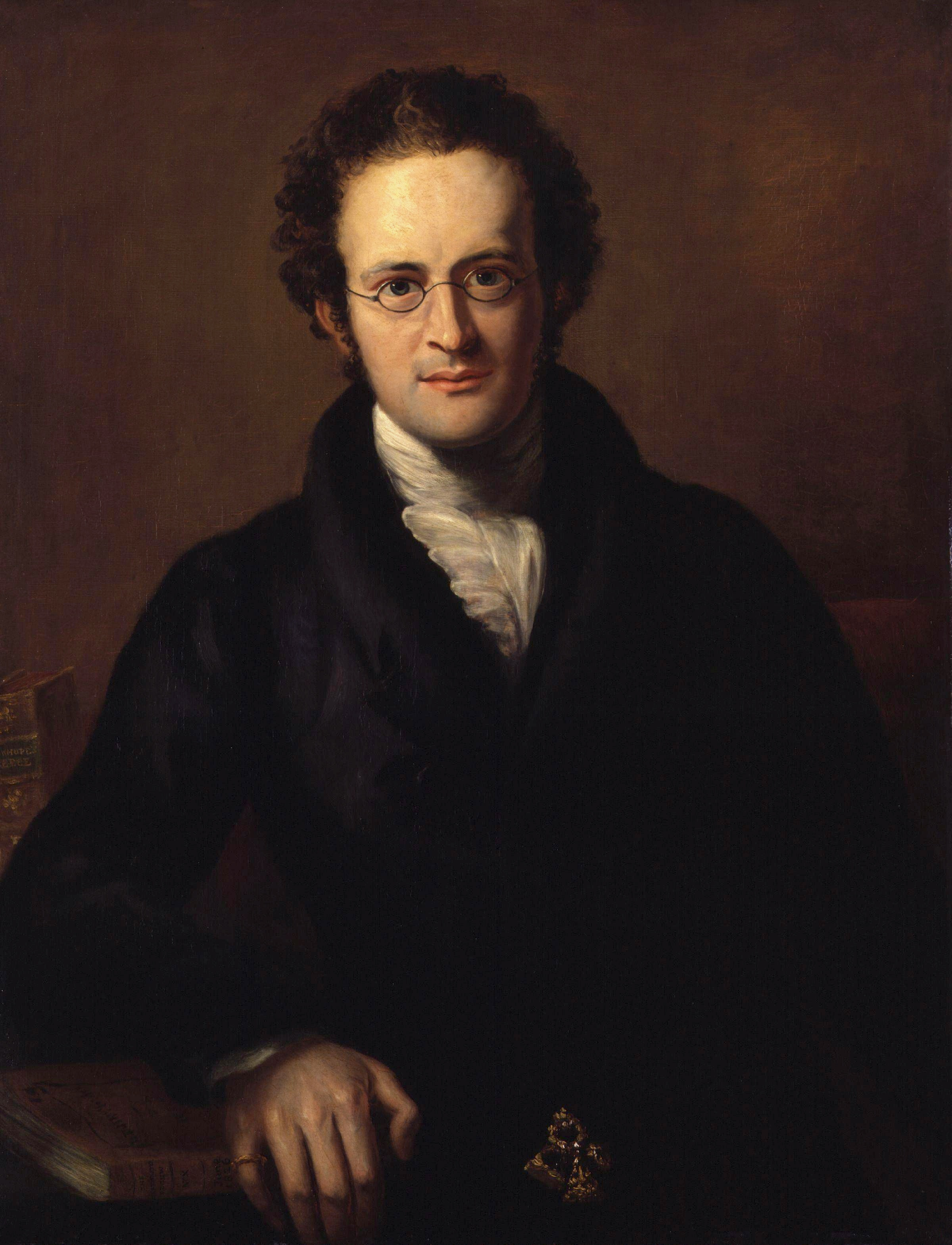
Arrival of Sir John Bowring the Governor of Hong Kong in 1855 culminated in the signing of Bowring Treaty that had great socioeconomic impact on Siam, becoming a turning point in Thai history.

The new king Mongkut, who had ascended the throne in 1851 and his minister Chaophraya Si Suriyawong (Chuang Bunnag) embraced more liberal policies than their predecessors. Sir John Bowring the Governor of Hong Kong, who was the delegate of Aberdeen government in London rather than the East India Company, arrived in Bangkok in March 1855 along with Harry Parkes in the ship Rattler. Si Suriyawong, called 'Kralahom', was an advocate of free trade principles. Though free trade proposals were initially opposed by Somdet Chaophraya 'Ong Noi' Phichaiyat, agreements were reached and Bowring Treaty was signed in April 1855. Harry Parkes brought drafted agreement to London where Law Officers of the Crown pushed for clarifications of some vagueness, leading to the 'Supplementary Agreement of 1856'. Parkes returned to Bangkok with ratifications exchanged in 1856. Bowring Treaty reduced and fixed general standard tariff at three percent and granted extraterritoriality to British subjects in Siam who would subject to British consular authority and British law rather than Siamese judiciary system. The British were also allowed land ownership in area within 24-hour journey from Bangkok. Charles Hillier became the first British consul in Bangkok in 1856 but he died soon four months later. King Mongkut granted a land on Chao Phraya River bank next to Portuguese Consulate to be British Consulate.

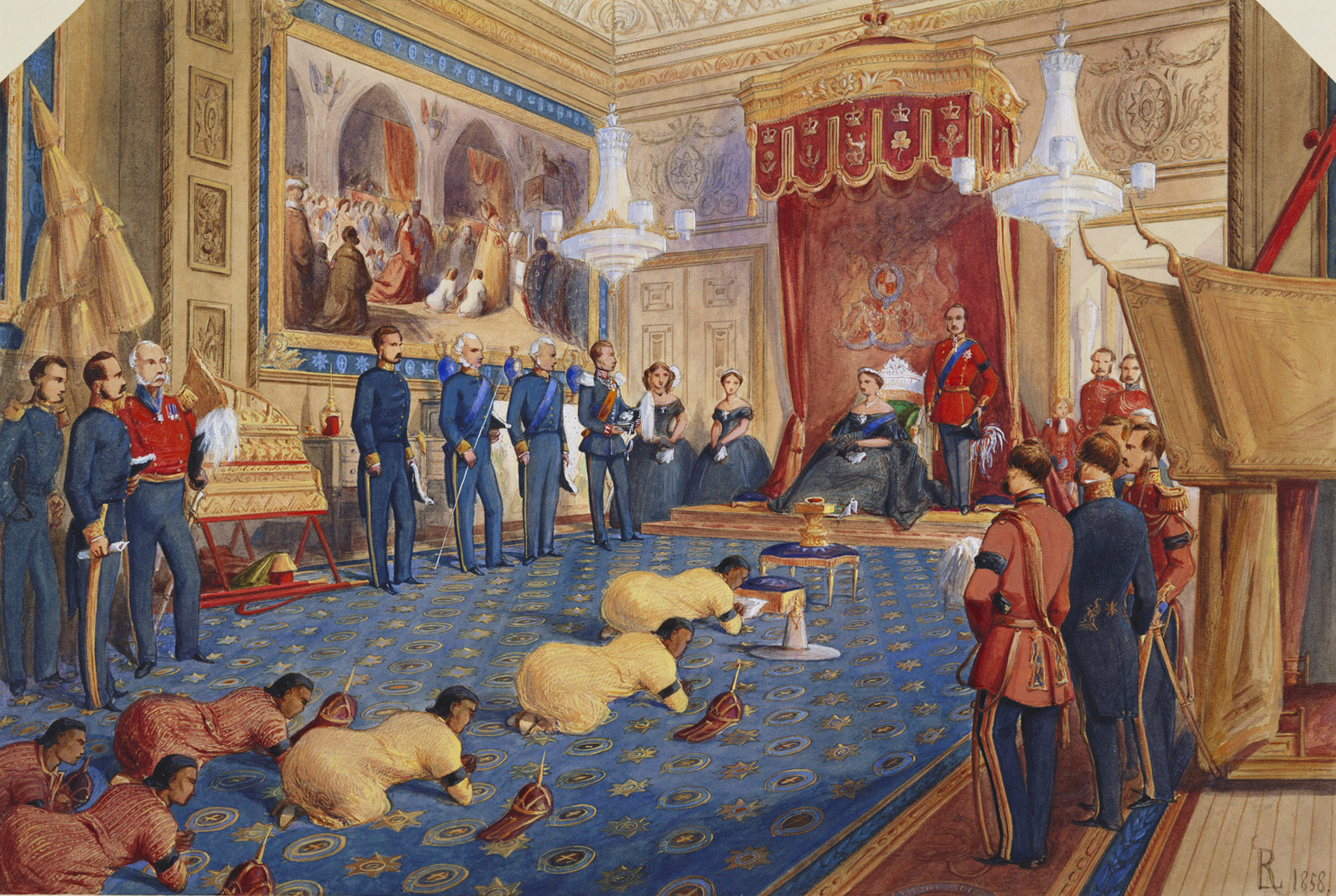
Siamese ambassadors, led by Phraya Montri Suriyawong (Chum Bunnag), in audience with Queen Victoria of the United Kingdom at Garter Throne Room, Windsor Castle, in November 1857

King Mongkut sent a Siamese mission, led by Phraya Montri Suriyawong (Chum Bunnag), boarding on British ship Encounter, to London in 1857. This mission was the first Siamese mission to Europe since the last one in Ayutthaya Period in 1688. The envoys had audience with Queen Victoria in November 1857. There was a question about whether the Bowring Treaty terms affected and applied in Siam's tributary states including Lanna Chiang Mai. Robert Schomburgk arrived in 1857 to take the consul position in Bangkok. Schomburgk, himself a naturalist, visited Chiangmai in 1859–60 to observe political situation and to explore possible ways to connect to Isthmus of Kra. King Kawilorot Suriyawong the ruler of Chiang Mai asserted that the Bowring Treaty did not affect Lanna as there was no mention about tributary states in the treaty and suggested that the British should conclude a separate treaty with Chiang Mai.

Sultan Mahmud Muzaffar Shah of Riau-Lingga was deposed by the Dutch in 1857. Also in 1857, Pahang Civil War, which pitted Raja Bendahara Tun Mutahir of Pahang, who was supported by British Straits Settlements, against his brother Wan Ahmad, erupted. Wan Ahmad allied with Mahmud Muzaffar, who also allied with Sultan Baginda Omar of Terengganu due to familial relations. Mahmud Muzaffar came to reside in Bangkok in 1861. In 1862, Mahmud Muzaffar, telling Siamese court that he was to visit his mother in Terengganu, procured a Siamese ship to Terengganu. William Cavenagh the governor of Straits Settlements was greatly alarmed by Siamese intervention as it would broaden the war. Cavenagh demanded that Siam retrieve Mahmud Muzaffar back to Bangkok and sent gunboats to Kuala Terengganu, pressing the Terengganu sultan to surrender. When Terengganu did not yield, British warships bombarded Terengganu, leaving fires and damages. Mahmud Muzaffar eventually returned to Siam. As Terengganu was Siam's tributary state, Chaophraya Thiphakorawong (Kham Bunnag) the Phrakhlang protested the incident to London, urging for investigation. British parliament criticized Cavenagh for his attacks on 'friendly town' and instructed British naval commanders not to attack without orders of the Admiralty.

British India had acquired Lower Burma in aftermath of the Second Anglo-Burmese War in 1852. In 1866, after difficulties, British India sent a special commissioner Edward O'Riley to meet with Siamese delegate Phraya Kiat the Mon officer at Three Pagodas Pass in 1866 to explore and demarcate Anglo-Siamese borders between Siam and British Burma in Tenasserim Hills from Salween River to Andaman Sea. Border agreement treaty was signed in 1868, becoming definition of modern Myanmar-Thailand borders.

==== Thomas George Knox ====
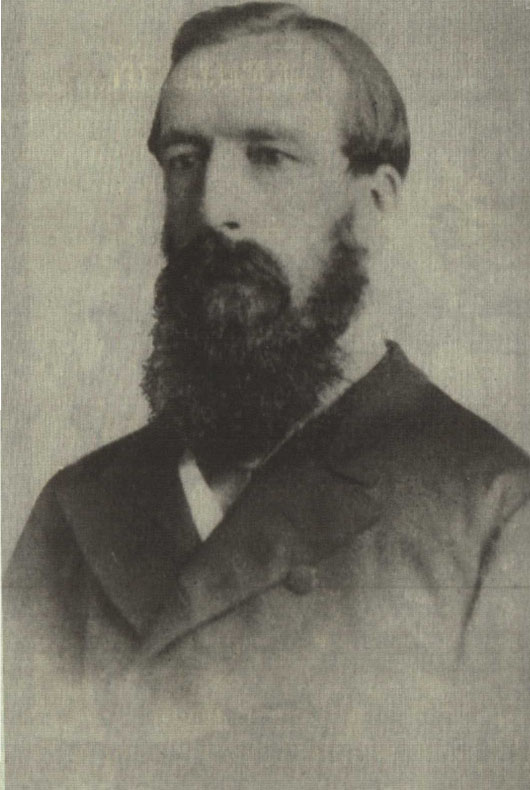
Thomas George Knox was the British representative in Siam for fourteen years from 1865 to 1879 and deeply involved in native Siamese politics.

Thomas George Knox arrived in Siam in 1851 when he was hired by Vice-King Pinklao to train modernizing Front Palace armies. Knox married a Tavoyan woman and had children with her including his daughter Fanny Knox. Thomas Knox then switched to diplomatic career, becoming vice-consul in 1857, consul in 1865 and consul-general in 1868. Acquainted with Siamese elite circle, Knox politically supported Pinklao and his lineage and became rather an ally of Si Suriyawong. With ascension of King Chulalongkorn in 1868 under regency of Si Suriyawong, Prince Wichaichan, Pinklao's son, was made Vice-King of Front Palace. When Knox was away in 1868, Chinese-Siamese tax collectors burnt down some British opium houses in Bangkok. Henry Alabaster the acting consul pressed for compensation from Siamese court. Si Suriyawong, who was the patron of tax collectors, vehemently defended his subordinates. When Knox returned, he ruled in favor of Si Suriyawong. The disgraced Alabaster resigned and left Siam. King Chulalongkorn assumed personal rule in 1873 and appointed Henry Alabaster, nemesis of Si Suriyawong, to be his royal advisor. During the Front Palace Crisis in 1874–75, when Knox was absent again, the acting consul Newman acted in concert with Knox's interest to support and provide shelter to Prince Wichaichan in British consulate. When Sir Andrew Clarke the governor of Straits Settlements, who had earlier maintained cordial correspondences with King Chulalongkorn, arrived in February 1875 to mediate the conflicts, he reversed British stance on the situation, favoring Chulalongkorn and forcing Wichaichan to accept humiliating terms instead.

Fanny Knox, daughter of Thomas Knox, married her lover Phra Pricha Konlakarn, a promising young Siamese nobleman, in 1878. Pricha Konlakarn and his father, Mot Amatyakul, had been by the king's side in political opposition against Si Suriyawong. By marrying to Pricha Konlakarn, Fanny Knox crossed factional division line and upset Si Suriyawong who intended to marry one of Bunnag gentlemen to her to cement alliance with consul Knox. Pricha's marriage drew ire from Siamese elite society as marrying Westerner was frowned upon at the time and required king's consent. Pricha Konlakarn had overseen a royal gold mine project. However, his abuses led to deaths of his workers. Local workers filed the case against Pricha Konlakarn with embezzlement and murder. Si Suriyawong, out of political motives, pushed for death penalty of Pricha as corruption on royal revenue was punishable by death. Thomas Knox, in desperate attempt to save Pricha Konlakarn for the sake of his daughter, brought British gunboat Foxhound to Bangkok to force the release of his son-in-law. Despite Knox's interjection, Pricha Konlakarn was sentenced to death and executed in November 1879. Thomas Knox, after his fourteen years of tenure, was relieved of his consul position in 1879 for his improper exercise of power and the Knox family left Siam. These incidents prompted King Chulalongkorn to send a mission to London in 1880 to explain the incident.

Siam in 1893

==== Agreements on Northern Siam ====
In late nineteenth century, the presence of British subjects, both the British themselves and British Asian subjects including the Burmese, in Northern Siam i.e. Lanna increased due to the expanding teak logging industry there. Siamese northern frontiers, where many ethnic tribes lived, was far from stable. Occasional Shan and Karen raids in the frontiers damaged British properties and sometimes British subjects were hurt. In 1873, the British Government of India pressed this issue onto Siam, urging Siam to ensure safety in the frontiers or else the British would occupy these lands themselves. Chulalongkorn then sent his delegate Phraya Charoen Ratchamaitri, a brother of Mot Amatyakul and uncle of Phra Pricha Konlakarn, to negotiate an agreement with British India at Calcutta. The Anglo–Siamese Treaty of Chiangmai in 1874 dictated Lanna–Siam to employ security forces to guard the frontiers and indirectly recognized the Salween River as the border between British and Siamese spheres of influences. However, this agreement alone was ineffective in dealings with British subjects in Lanna. The Chiangmai Treaty of 1883 stipulated establishment of the second British consulate at Chiang Mai and Anglo–Siamese mixed judicial court, composing of native Siamese judges applying Siamese law with British legal advisors, at Chiang Mai to oversee British subjects in provinces of Chiang Mai, Lampang and Lamphun. Edward Blencowe Gould served as the first British vice-consul in Chiang Mai in 1884.

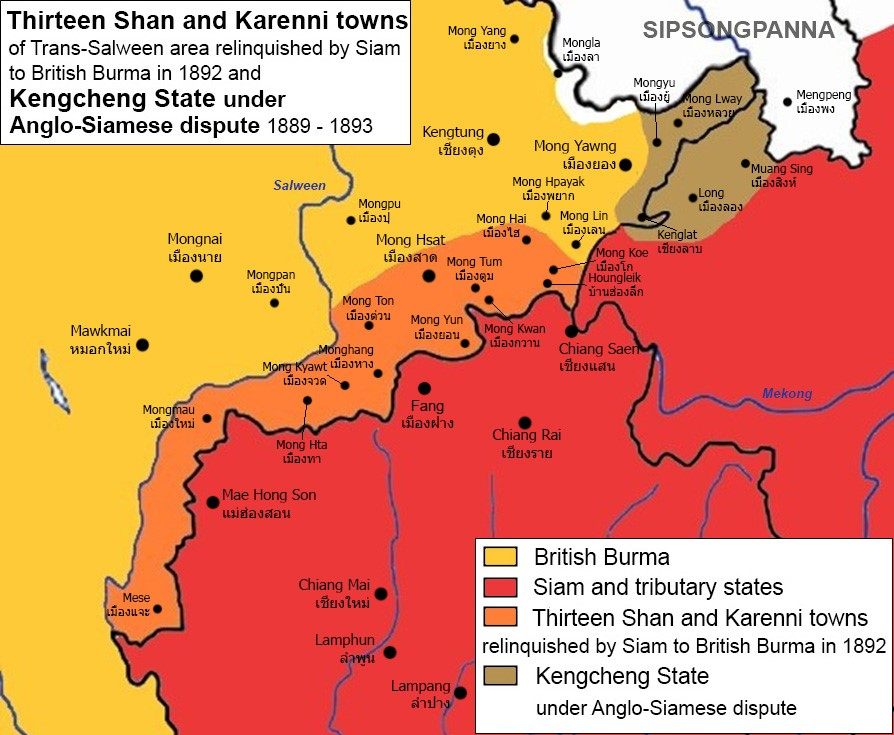
Orange shows the thirteen Shan and Karenni towns of trans-Salween region given up by Siam to British Burma in 1892. Brown shows Kengcheng state under Anglo–Siamese dispute.

After British conquest of Burma in the Third Anglo–Burmese War in 1885, the British completed their control over the Shan States in 1889. Even though the British had previously recognized the eastern bank of Salween as being under Siamese influence, Siam held no power nor authorities over the trans-Salween Shan States. Siam then had borders with British Burma in Lanna, leading to Anglo–Siamese competitions over these mountainous unclaimed lands, which were rich in profitable teak. In 1884, Prince Phichit Prichakorn the Kha Luang, the king's commissioner at Chiang Mai, laid claims to trans-Salween 'Five Shan towns' or 'Thirteen Shan and Karenni towns' by organizing them into a unit called Wiang Chaipricha and sending Siamese troops to occupy the area. British Burma, however, viewed these towns as belonging to the Shan States under British control. Situation in northern frontiers was further aggravated by conflicts between Kengtung and the Tai Lue princely statelet of Chiang Khaeng or Kengcheng. Kengcheng and Kengtung had dynastic ties as Lord Kawng Tai of Kengcheng ascended as the ruler of Kengtung in 1881. Kawng Tai replaced himself with his uncle Salino as the new ruler of Kengcheng but Salino sought to move away from Burmese domination by moving his seat to Muang Sing on the eastern side of Mekong in 1887.

In 1889, the Government of India requested Anglo–Siamese joint boundaries settlement, led by British official Ney Elias but Siam did not attend. Ney Elias then proceeded to unilaterally demarcate the borders, which became northern portions of modern Myanmar–Thailand borders, and told the Siamese occupying forces to leave the trans-Salween disputed area. Also in 1889, King Chulalongkorn commanded the Northern Thai Prince of Nan to bring forces to occupy and vassalize Kengcheng to safeguard against British incursions. Kengtung accepted British rule in 1890. British Burma then, on behalf of Kengtung, laid claims to Kengcheng as the British had been seeking pathways to Sipsongpanna to China. W.J. Archer the British vice-consul of Chiang Mai argued that Kengcheng's vassalage to Siam was invalid. The looming French threats left Siam with no choices but to comply with British demands. In 1892, King Chulalongkorn consented to surrender trans-Salween Shan–Karenni towns to British Burma. France's entry into the scene further complicated the issue. In the aftermath of Franco–Siamese War of 1893, French Indochina annexed and laid claims to all Siamese lands east of Mekong, including eastern half of Kengcheng. This led to conflicting British and French claims in Kengcheng in upper reaches of Mekong in order to reach China. The British outright seized control of whole Kengcheng in 1895. Both sides eventually agreed to divide Kengcheng among themselves, using the Mekong as border, in 1896 with eastern half of Kengcheng going to French Indochina and western half going to British Burma.

==== Secret Convention of 1897 ====
During the Franco–Siamese conflicts, Lord Rosebery the British Foreign Secretary adopted a non-intervening policy, agreeing to allow the French to encroach and annex Siamese Lao lands east of Mekong, in order to avoid Anglo–French conflicts, while also preserving Siam's sovereignty. Facing French threats, Siam requested for British assistance. When the French actually invaded Siam in March 1893, Rosebery expected the French to be satisfied with annexation only up to Middle Mekong. Rosebery made clear that the British would not intervene, while also telling Siam to comply with French demands. Rosebery sent some British gunboats to Bangkok under pretext to protect British subjects just to please the Siamese as the British vessels did not engage with the invading French gunboats during the Paknam Incident. However, the French indeed annexed up to Upper Mekong, not satisfied with Middle Mekong as Rosebery had expected, reaching Kengcheng, which the British also claimed, leading to overlapping Anglo–French territorial claims at Kengcheng in the upper reaches of Mekong. The British were dissatisfied with French aggression towards Siam. The British Empire and French Republic were on the brink of war over Siam in July 1893.

The returning British Foreign Secretary Lord Salisbury, who reconsidered British policies towards this Franco–Siamese issue, was more proactive in defending Siam. In October 1895, Lord Salisbury proposed that both the British and the French should jointly agree to leave the Menam Chao Phraya River valley of Central Siam alone. The French agreed with this plan as it would allow both the British and the French to pursue colonial acquisitions outside Central Siam, Malay peninsula for the British and Northeastern Siam for the French. The Anglo-French Declaration was signed in January 1896, without Siamese acknowledgement, in which neither the British nor the French should advance their armed forces into the Menam Valley of Central Siam, guaranteeing Siam's sovereignty only in Central Siam, allowing British intervention in Southern Siam.

Siam in 1900

Lord Salisbury, however, skeptically viewed this 1896 declaration as being insufficient to safeguard Siam and proposed Siam for another treaty. The Anglo–Siamese Secret Convention was signed on 6 April 1897, in which Siam was made to promise that Siam would not grant any concessions in Southern Siam below Bang Saphan to any other colonial powers than the British. This 1897 Secret Convention was problematic for Siam as it served to guarantee British interests in Malay peninsula and also thwarted Siam's attempt to bring a third power, namely the German Empire, into the scene. Siam, still under French threats, had no choices but to accept any forms of British protection. This 'Secret Convention' was kept in secrecy because both Siam and the British could not afford the French to demand similar concessions. Even the government of Straits Settlements was minimally informed about this treaty. The British exploited Siam's vulnerability to further their gains in the Malay peninsula. The treaty soon became a source of frictions and discontents between the British and Siamese government as Siam could not grant any concessions, both territorial and commercial, to any other powers but only to the British in Southern Siam.

==== Treaty of 1909 ====
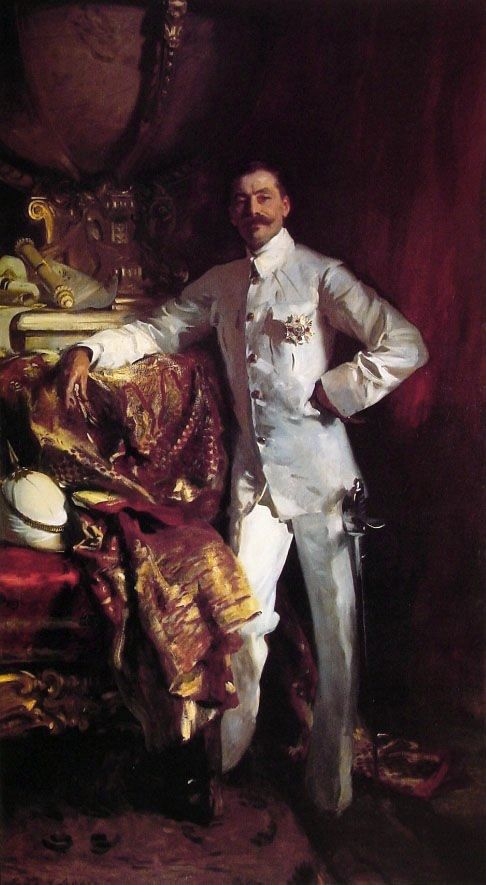
Frank Swettenham, the governor of Straits Settlements from 1901 to 1904, was the most prominent proponent of colonial expansion of British Malaya.

Since 1786, Northern Malay sultanates of Kedah, Kelantan and Terengganu had owed traditional tributes of bunga mas to Siamese royal court, which were sent regularly. However, these tributary relations were vague and ill-defined in the realm of modern international law and diplomacy. British Foreign Office and Colonial Office had different approaches towards Siamese rule over the Malay peninsula and Siam usually dealt directly with London to bypass the colonial government at Singapore. In 1882, Frank Swettenham argued that Malay bunga mas tribute to Siam was a 'token of friendship' rather than token of submission but the Foreign Office ruled in favor of Siam in 1885, saying that the British should maintain Siam's sovereignty in the region as a buffer state. Lord Salisbury the British Foreign Secretary was sympathetic towards Siam, compromising British Malaya's expansion. Things took a downturn for Siam during 1900–1902. Lord Lansdowne the new British Foreign Secretary supported British colonial expansion in Malay peninsula at the expense of Siam. Muhammad IV the new sultan of Kelantan was pro-British. Frank Swettenham the most outspoken advocate of British colonial expansion in Malay peninsula, who had been working against Siamese rule over the Malays since the 1880s, was the governor of Straits Settlements.

In 1900, Robert William Duff procured a tin mining patent in Kelantan from Sultan of Kelantan for his company Duff Syndicate but his grant was not ratified by Siamese government, who insisted that tributary rulers had no rights to issue concessions without approval from Bangkok. Duff complained his case to the Foreign Office and to Frank Swettenham, who took this opportunity to dismantle Siamese influence. Swettenham and Lord Lansdowne forcefully proposed that Siam should allow British advisors in Kelantan and Terengganu. King Chulalongkorn sent a delegate Phraya Si Sahathep to talk directly to Lansdowne at London that Siam agreed to send British advisors to those Malay states but they were to be chosen by Siam. Kelantan-Siam and Terengganu-Siam Treaties were signed in December 1902, under British mediation, establishing the 'Advisor system'. Pro-Siamese British advisors, who were more loyal to Bangkok than to Singapore, were sent to Kelantan and Terengganu in July 1903, much to the dismay of Swettenham, who expected pro-colonial personnel from Straits Settlements to be appointed there instead.

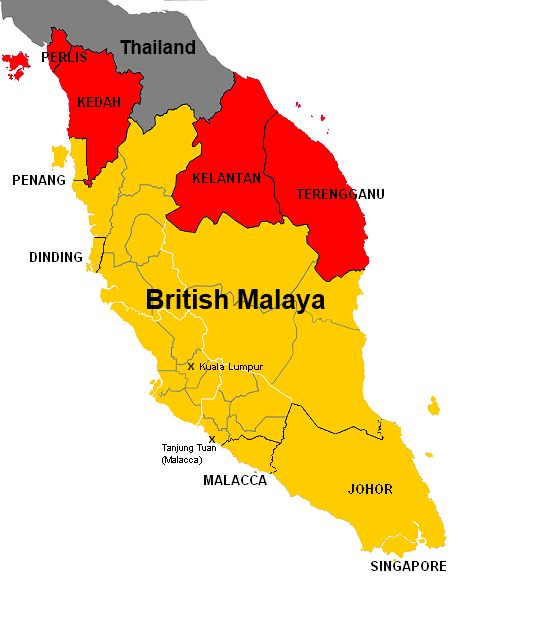
In Anglo–Siamese Treaty of 1909, Siam ceded four Malay sultanates of Kedah, Kelantan, Terengganu and Perlis to British Malaya in exchange for surrender of British extraterritorial jurisdiction, a 4 million pound loan and abrogation of Secret Treaty of 1897.

In Franco–Siamese Treaty of 1907, Siam ceded Northwestern Cambodia to French Indochina in exchange for curtailment of French extraterritorial jurisdiction in Siam. Edward Strobel, King Chulalongkorn's advisor, told Siamese government that Siam should sacrifice its non-Thai peripheral tributary states in exchange for more favorable treaty terms, in similar manner to the Franco–Siamese Treaty of 1907. This connotation coincided with Southern Siamese railway project. The Anglo–Siamese Treaty was signed on 10 March 1909 between Prince Devawongse the Siam's Foreign Minister and Ralph Paget the British Minister at Bangkok, in which Siam ceded Northern Malay sultanates including Kedah, Kelantan, Terengganu and Perlis, which had been more or less, at least nominally, under Siamese suzerainty, to British Malaya in exchange for all British subjects in Siam, both Asian and European, coming under Siamese modernized legal system, the 4 million pound British loan to Siam for construction of Southern Siamese railways and abrogation of the controversial Secret Convention of 1897, returning foreign policy independence to Siam. British extraterritorial jurisdiction over Siam, stipulated by the Bowring Treaty of 1855 some sixty years prior, was mostly abolished by this Anglo–Siamese Treaty of 1909.

=== France ===
==== Early contacts ====
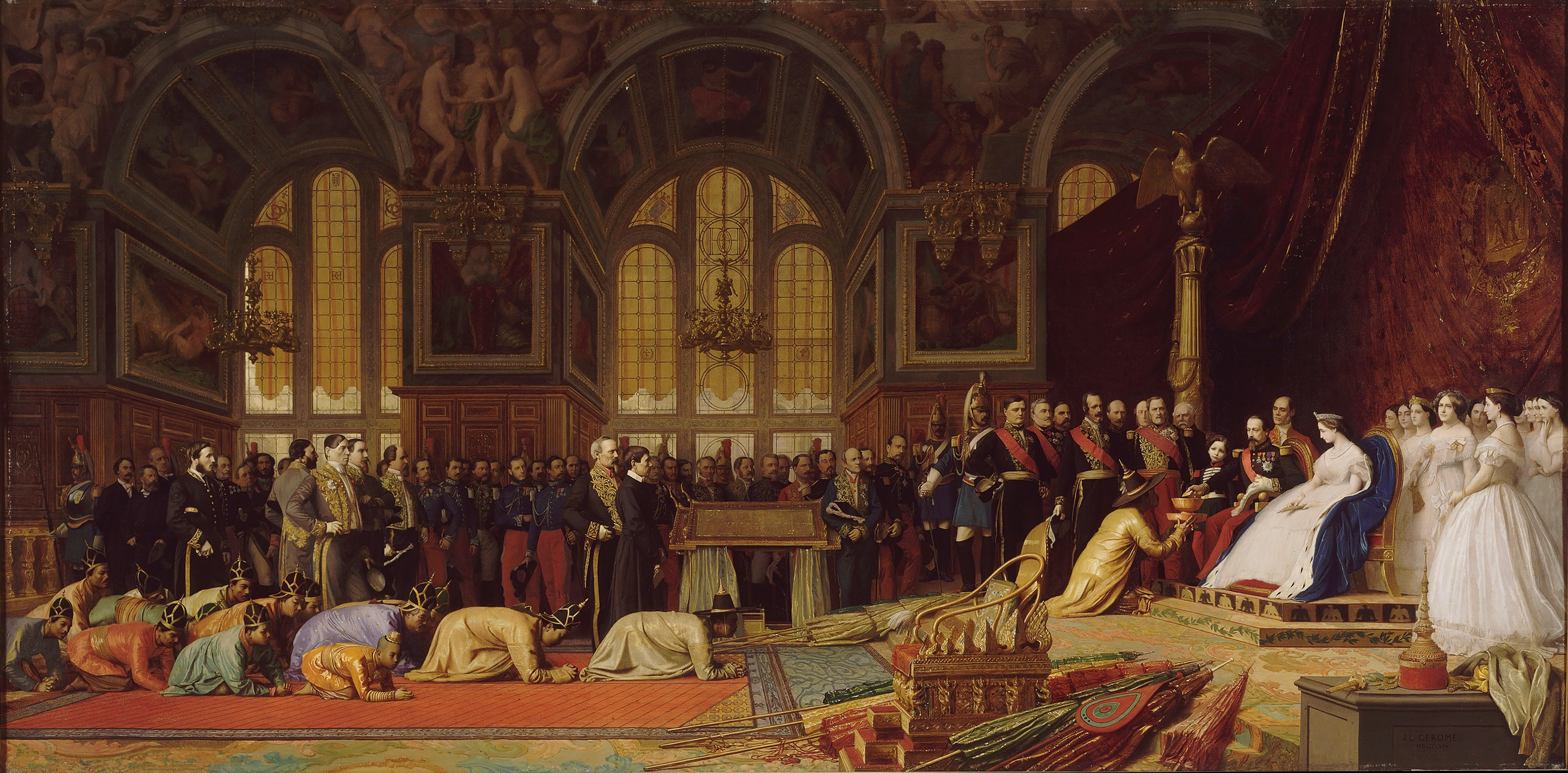
Reception of the Siamese ambassadors by the Emperor Napoleon III at the Palace of Fontainebleau, June 27, 1861, by Jean-Leon Gerome, depicting Phraya Siphiphat (Phae Bunnag) handling the Siamese royal letter to Emperor Napoleon III

Franco-Siamese relations were terminated after Siamese revolution of 1688 in Ayutthaya Period. The French maintained low-level presence in Siam through French missionary works. In 1856, Charles de Montigny arrived in Bangkok, with the aid of Jean-Baptiste Pallegoix the vicar apostolic of Siam, to conclude Franco-Siamese Treaty of 1856 that, in similar manner to British Bowring Treaty, granted low tariff and extraterritoriality to the French. Comte de Castelnau became the first French consul in Bangkok. King Mongkut sent a mission led by Phraya Siphiphat (Phae Bunnag) to Paris in 1861, where they had audience with Emperor Napoleon III.

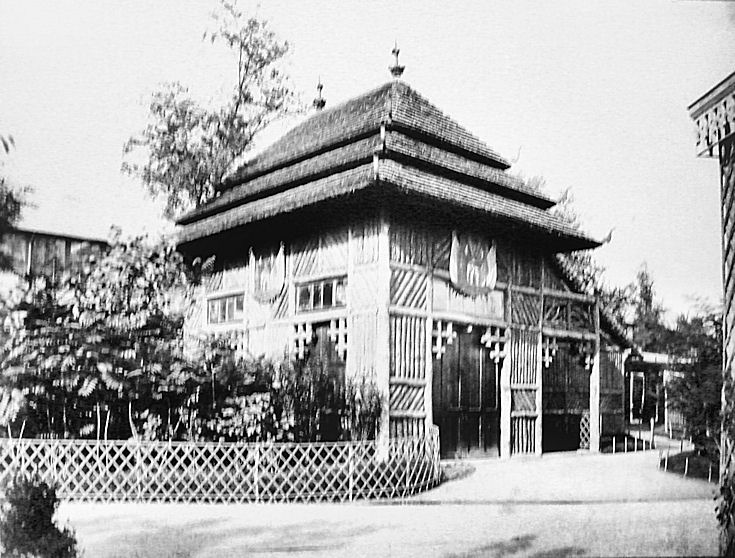
Siamese elephant pavilion at Exposition Universelle at Paris in 1867

After the French had acquired Cochinchina in 1862, they took over Vietnam's position in competing against Siam and were proved to be expansionist colonial power. Earlier in 1860, King Ang Duong of Cambodia had died, resulting in civil war between Norodom and his brother Si Votha. Pierre-Paul de La Grandière the governor of French Cochinchina sailed to Oudong in 1863, persuading Norodom to sign a treaty to make Cambodia a French protectorate without Siam's acknowledgement. Gabriel Aubaret assumed consular position in Bangkok in 1864. The French urged Siam to release Cambodian royal regalia for Norodom. Siam sent Phraya Montri Suriyawong (Chum Bunnag), accompanied by French Consul Aubaret, to bring Cambodian regalia to Oudong in June 1864, where French admiral Desmoulins placed Cambodian crown onto Norodom, signifying French authority over Cambodia. However, Chaophraya Si Suriyawong the Kralahom had earlier secretly had Norodom sign another opposing treaty that recognized Siamese suzerainty over Cambodia, which was published in The Straits Times in August 1864. Aubaret was embarrassed at the existence of such opposing treaty. The French sought to annul Cambodian-Siamese treaty and Aubaret brought gunboat Mitraille to Bangkok in 1864. Compromise agreement draft between Siam and France was brought by Aubaret to Paris to be ratified in 1865. However, ratification was delayed at Paris due to prospect that France would have to accept Siamese claims over 'Siamese Laos' – France's future colonial ambitions. Siam sent another mission to Paris, led by Phraya Surawong Waiyawat (Won Bunnag), in 1865 to settle Cambodian issue disputes and to attend Exposition Universelle. The treaty was finally ratified in July 1867. Earlier Cambodian-Siamese treaty was annulled as Siam officially ceded Cambodia to France but retained northwestern Cambodia including Battambang and Siemreap. The treaty also allowed the French to navigate the Mekong in Siamese territories, leading to French Mekong expedition of 1866–1868. Siam then made joint preliminary border demarcations with French Cambodia in 1868 with border markers put at Chikraeng on northern side of Tonle Sap and at Moung Ruessei on the southern side, with Northwestern Cambodia remaining under Siamese rule.

==== Conflicts over Sipsong Chuthai ====
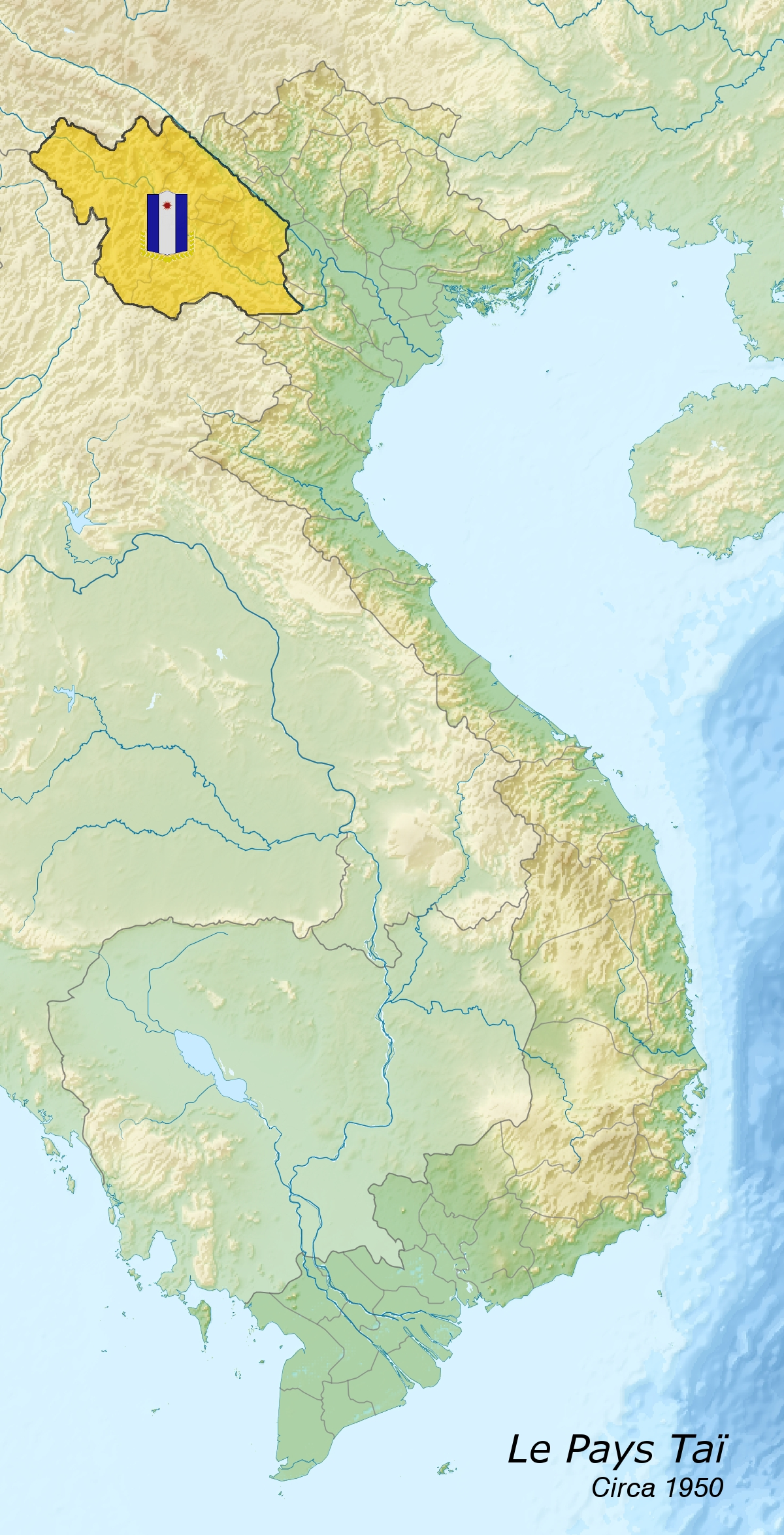
Sipsong Chuthai or Sipsong Chauthai – a confederacy of twelve Tai princedoms. During 1886–1888, Siam and French Indochina competed to claim and gain control over this area.

The French gained control of Vietnam through the Treaty of Huế in 1884, also gaining complete control of Tonkin or Northern Vietnam after the Sino-French War of 1884–1885. After gaining control over Vietnam, the French pursued colonial ambitions over Laos, which had been under Siamese control since 1779. In the highlands that separated Laos from Northern Vietnam, there had been several Tai princedoms, including Sipsong Chuthai, Houaphanh and Muang Phuan that owed traditional allegiances and tributes to either or both Laos–Siam and Vietnam. The Haws or Chinese insurgents of the aborted Taiping Rebellion had been ravaging and pillaging these Tai princedoms since the 1870s and Siam struggled hard to deflect and contain the Haws in the Haw Wars. The French demanded that Siam allow establishment of second French consulate at Luang Prabang to mimic similar rights that Siam had granted to the British at Chiang Mai in 1883, even though there was virtually no French subjects in Laos by that time. Siam allowed the French to establish the second consulate at Luang Prabang in 1886 with Auguste Pavie, who was an advocate of making Laos a French colony, serving as the first French vice-consul at Luang Prabang. Pavie's taking of position at Luang Prabang coincided with Siamese expedition under Chaomuen Waiworanat (later became Chaophraya Surasak Montri) to suppress the Haws in 1885–1887. The Siamese faced opposition from Đèo Văn Trị, son of Đèo Văn Sinh the White Tai ruler of Muang Lay, who had allied with the Haws. Believing that the Haws had been pacified, Waiworanat ended his campaign and returned to Bangkok in 1887. However, Đèo Văn Trị was enraged that the Siamese had captured his brothers so he ransacked Luang Prabang two months later in 1887. Pavie rescued King Ounkham of Luang Prabang from his burning palace to Bangkok.

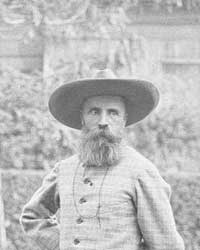
Auguste Pavie is known for his crucial role in French acquisition of Laos in 1893 and Sipsong Chuthai in 1888, partaking in many diplomatic conflicts against Siam. He played instrumental rule in the Franco-Siamese War of 1893.

The sack of Luang Prabang by Đèo Văn Trị in 1887 worsened Siam's situation in the frontiers and also provided the French an opportunity to challenge Siam's power in the region. Siam had no choice but to request for French military aid against the Haws. Unbeknownst to Siam, the French had allied with Đèo Văn Trị who allowed French troops under Théophile Pennequin to occupy Muang Lay in French expedition to conquer Sipsong Chuthai. Surasak Montri led his Siamese troops to the Black Tai town of Muang Thaeng or Điện Biên Phủ in 1887 but the wars to suppress the Haws had turned into Franco–Siamese conflicts over Sipsong Chuthai instead, in which surveys and mapmaking are crucial parts to territorial claims of each party on the region. In December 1888, after arguments, in the Agreement of Muang Thaeng, Pavie and Surasak Montri agreed that Siam would withdraw from Sipsong Chuthai in exchange for Siam retaining Houaphanh and Muang Phuan. Pavie and French Indochina based their claims on Laos on Vietnamese historical archives.

==== Franco–Siamese War and Paknam incident ====
Vietnamese Nguyen government appointed a Tai Phuan official called Bang Bien, who had rebelled against Siam, as an official in Muang Phuan under French auspices. This act enraged Siamese government, who sent troops to arrest Bang Bien at Muang Phuan in 1891. Pavie was transferred from Luang Prabang to become the French consul-general at Bangkok in 1892. In April 1892, two French men defied Siamese authorities by attempting to cross border at Khammouane without proper documents nor paying tariffs, ending up expelled. French Colonial Party or Parti Colonial pushed to make Siam a French protectorate. The French wanted the whole eastern side of Mekong in order to reach the Upper Mekong, which they believed would provide access to China. Next year, Jean Marie Antoine de Lanessan the governor-general of French Indochina began offensives into Siam-controlled territories of Laos by sending forces to seize Southern Laos around Stung Treng and Khong in March 1893, thus the Franco–Siamese War began. Also in March, Pavie brought French gunboat Lutin to French embassy at Bangkok in a gunboat diplomacy to pressure Siam to relinquish all Lao lands on the left bank (east) of Mekong to French Indochina. The Siamese believed that they had support from the British so they did not yield. Siamese defense forces at the frontiers responded, resulting in capture of French official Thoreaux in May and the killing of French officer Grosgurin in June at the hands of Siamese commander Phra Yot Mueang Khwang. French governments, both colonial and republican, with their colonialist and expansionist sentiments, reacted furiously to these events. Through journalism, French Colonial Party incited public hatred in France towards Siam. Siam also attempted to enlist support from the British, who took neutral stance and told Siam not to be provocative instead.

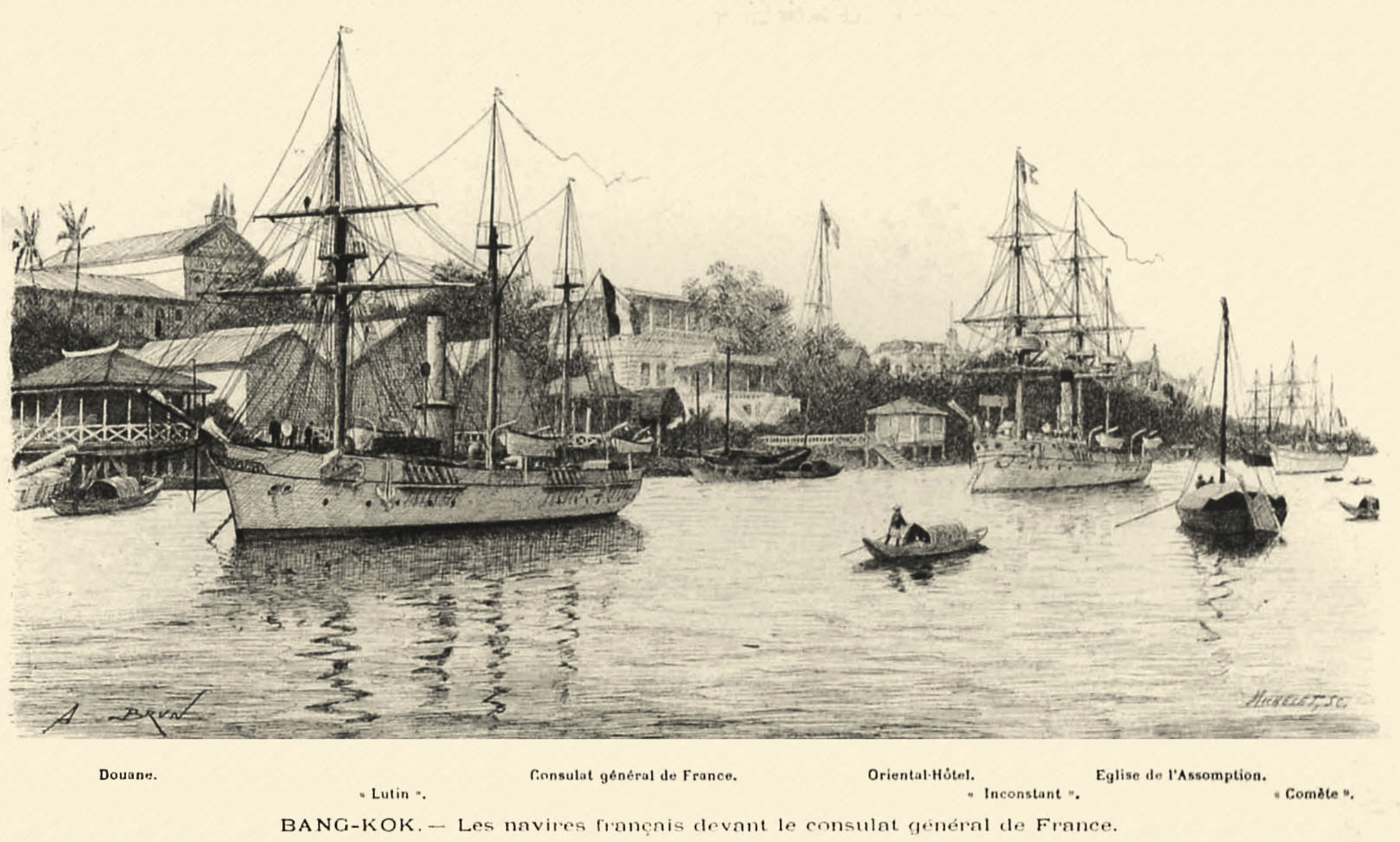
Cover of L'Illustration depicting French gunboats Lutin, Inconstant and Comète anchoring at the French legation in Bangkok, published on 22 July 1893.

British gunboats began to arrive in Bangkok in early July 1893, under the pretext to protect British subjects. British arrival prompted Pavie, who asserted that the French had rights to bring vessels to Bangkok per the 1856 Treaty, to send two more French gunboats Comète and Inconstant to Bangkok to join Lutin the French gunboat already there, escalating the threats. Rear Admiral Edgar Humann at Saigon commanded Captain Borey to bring those two French gunboats to Bangkok. With escalating French threats from Pavie, Prince Dewavongse the Siamese Minister of Foreign Affairs telegraphed the Siamese minister at Paris to approach Jules Develle the French Minister of Foreign Affairs for arbitration. Develle agreed to halt Pavie's two gunboats and sent Charles Le Myre de Vilers to convince Siam to accept French terms. Pavie had no choices but to accept the policy of his superior. However, in a historic turn of event, Captain Borey, who had not yet been informed about the change of French plans, proceeded to cross the river bar at Paknam to Bangkok on 13 July 1893, bringing Comète and Inconstant, leading to the Paknam Incident. Borey exchanged gunfires with Siamese defenders at Chulachomklao Fort under Danish commander "Phraya Chonlayuth Yothin" Andreas du Plessis de Richelieu. Borey eventually managed to anchor off at the French embassy. Both the Siamese and the French were equally shocked by the actions of Captain Borey.

==== Territorial losses to French Indochina ====
Actions of Captain Borey nevertheless brought Siam to the knees in favor of the French. On 20 July 1893, Auguste Pavie delivered ultimata to the Siamese government, including ceding of all lands east of Mekong to French Indochina, paying indemnities to French damages, punishment of offending Siamese officials and deposition of three million francs to guarantee the terms. Siam bargained to cede only to the 18th parallel, angering the French. The French then officially severed their relations with Siam on July 26 and imposed naval blockade on Bangkok at the mouth of Chao Phraya River. Siam eventually accepted all French demands unconditionally as the blockade was lifted and Franco–Siamese relations were restored. To punish Siam for the delay, the French imposed even harsher terms and went on to occupy Chanthabun or Chanthaburi in August 1893. The Franco–Siamese Treaty of 1893 was signed on 3 October 1893 between Prince Dewawongse the Siamese Foreign Minister and Le Myre de Vilers as French plenipotentiary. Siam officially ceded all Lao lands east of Mekong to French Indochina. A demilitarized zone of 25 kilometers all along the western bank of Mekong only on the Siamese side was established, where the Siamese were forbidden to have any military garrisons. Siamese government paid three million francs for indemnities. The French would continue to occupy Chanthaburi until these terms were achieved and satisfied. Anglo-French Declaration of January 1896 between British and French governments, not under knowledge of Siam, guaranteed Siamese sovereignty only in Central Siam, allowing French intervention in Eastern and Northeastern Siam. The French refused all Siamese officials, both civil and military, to enter this so-called demilitarized zone, leading to Siamese abandonment of Chiang Saen and Nongkhai cities that fell in the zone.

Expansion of French Indochina at the expense of Siam

The French demanded registration of Lao, Cambodian, and Vietnamese immigrants in Siam, regardless of how many generations they had been in Siam, including voluntary immigrants and war prisoners of the pre-modern era, as French protégés or French Asian subjects, effectively exerting French jurisdiction over Siam. Siamese government said that this demand was impossible because those ethnic immigrants had been assimilated and their ancestries were largely forgotten. The French also learned that the Kingdom of Luang Prabang, newly acquired by the French in 1893, had ruled over some lands west of Mekong including Sainyabuli and Dansai. Franco–Siamese dispute over these issues led to protracted negotiation, in which Prince Dewawongse served as the Siamese representative, and the continuing French occupation of Chanthaburi. In the Franco–Siamese Convention of 1902, Siam agreed to registration of French Asian subjects in Siam as French protégés. However, the treaty faced strong opposition in the French parliament, who insisted that Siam should cede more territories. In the augmented treaty version of 1904, Siam ceded areas on the west (right) bank of Mekong, including Sainyabuli, Champasak and Melouprey (modern Preah Vihear province) to French Indochina in exchange for settlement over "French Asian subjects" in Siam and French withdrawal from Chanthaburi, signed in February 1904.

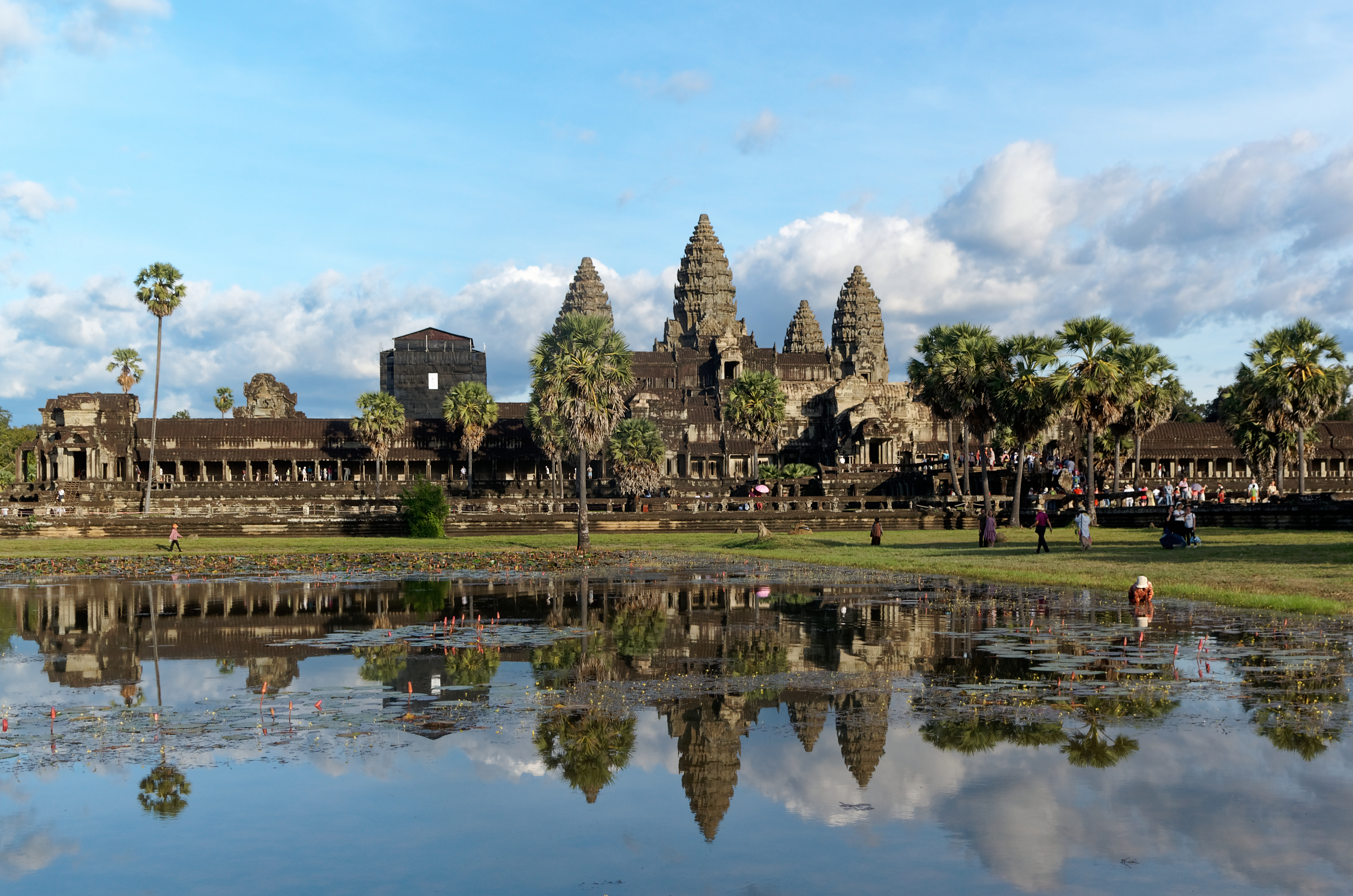
Northwestern Cambodia, containing Angkor Wat in modern Siemreap, had been ruled by Siam-appointed governors since 1794. Through Franco–Siamese Treaty of 1907, Siam ceded this area to French Indochina.

Siam had annexed Northwestern Cambodia, including Battambang, Siemreap, and Sisophon (modern Cambodian provinces of Battambang, Siem Reap, Banteay Meanchey, and Oddar Meanchey, called "Inner Cambodia" in Thai), containing Angkor Wat, under direct Siamese rule in 1794 through a line of Siam-appointed governors of Battambang. Franco–Siamese Treaty of 1867 confirmed Siamese rule over Northwestern Cambodia. However, the French viewed this area as being rightfully belonging to Cambodia. Siam organized Northwestern Cambodia into a Monthon in 1891, which was renamed as Monthon Burapha or "Eastern Province" in 1901. After the 1904 Treaty, in spite of French withdrawal from Chanthaburi, the French proceeded to occupy Kratt or Trat and Dansai to enforce treaty terms. France and Siam brought forward a delimitation commission to define boundaries between Siam and French Indochina. Fernand Bernard was appointed as the French representative. Bernard reported back to Paris in 1906 that French holding of Dansai and Kratt was impractical. The Franco–Siamese Treaty of 1907 was signed on 13 March 1907 between Prince Dewawongse and Victor Collin de Plancy the French minister in Bangkok, in which Siam ceded Northwestern Cambodia to French Indochina in exchange for Trat and Dansai going back to Siam and the new registered French Asian subjects in Siam coming under Siamese legal system instead. This 1907 Treaty and the accompanying territorial settlement had ramification into modern times, resulting in the Cambodian–Thai border dispute lasting into the 21st century.

=== United States ===
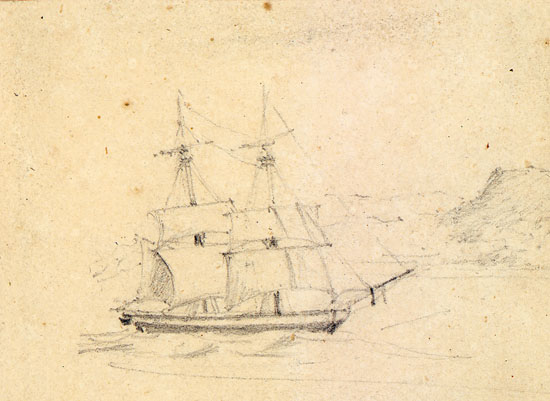
Edmund Roberts, the American diplomat, arrived in Bangkok in March 1833 with the USS Peacock (shown in the image).

Edmund Roberts was appointed by President Andrew Jackson as the American envoy to the Far East in 1831. After visiting Canton and Danang, Roberts arrived in Bangkok in 1833 on the US Sloop-of-war Peacock. Roberts met and negotiated with Chao Phraya Phrakhlang. The draft of Treaty of Amity and Commerce, which became known as the 'Roberts Treaty', was presented to King Rama III in 1833. The Roberts Treaty was the first treaty between United States and an Asian nation and Siam became the first Asian nation to come into official relations with United States. The content of the treaty was largely in the same manner as the British Burney Treaty. Difference between the American Roberts Treaty and British Burney Treaty was that the United States required to be granted the same prospective benefits as other Western nations. If Siam reduced the tariffs of any other Western nations, the United States would be eligible for the same rights. If Siam allowed any other Western nations but the Portuguese to establish a consulate, the Americans would also be allowed. The treaty also stipulated that if an American failed to pay Siamese debts or bankrupted, the Siamese would not punish or hold the American debtor as slave.

However, the Chinese tax collector system imposed many tariffs in the 1840s that rendered trade much less profitable. No American merchants ship sailed to Bangkok from 1838 to 1850. Like the British, the Americans later requested for amendments of the initial treaty. Joseph Balestier, a French man who became American diplomat, arrived in Bangkok in 1850 to propose the amendments. Phrakhlang (Dit Bunnag), the usual receiver of Western envoys, had been away conducting the Sak Lek in Southern Siam. Phrakhlang's younger brother Phraya Siphiphat (That Bunnag) took over the task of receiving Joseph Balestier. However, the meetings were not friendly ones. According to Thai chronicles, Balestier behaved unceremoniously. Phraya Siphiphat rejected any proposals to modify the existing treaty. Balestier even did not manage to deliver the presidential letter. When Phrakhlang returned, Balestier complained to him that his younger brother Siphiphat had offended him as the envoy of the President of the United States but Phrakhlang did not respond. Eventually, Balestier left Bangkok empty-handed.

Townsend Harris, on his way to Japan, arrived in Siam in April 1856 on USS San Jacinto to conclude a new treaty. Arrival of Harris was at the same time when the British Harry Parkes had been negotiating supplementary terms of Bowring Treaty. Reception of the American envoy was delayed to due Siamese court preventing the British and the American to meet and join efforts to demand further concessions. Harris presented gifts from President Franklin Pierce to Siamese court and asserted to Vice-King Pinklao that the United States "had no territory in the East and desired none". Siamese Harris Treaty, based on Bowring Treaty and signed in May 1856, granted similar rights to the Americans including low tariff and extraterritoriality. Stephen Matoon was hired as the first American consul in Bangkok. Compared to the British and the French, the United States had little interest in Siam. J.H. Chandler succeeded as American consul in Bangkok in 1859. King Mongkut sent a letter to President Abraham Lincoln in 1861, suggesting that Siam would gift elephants to be beasts of burden, in which President Lincoln politely declined, stating that "steam has been our best and most efficient agent of transportation in internal commerce". In 1879, former US President Ulysses S. Grant travelled to Bangkok and met with King Rama V, the first time a US President visited Thailand.

In the 1920s, the Siamese government appointed American diplomat Francis Bowes Sayre Sr., the son-in-law of President Woodrow Wilson, as foreign affairs advisor to King Rama VII. He played a pivotal role in helping the Siamese Thai government to end its extraterritorial treaties with the European powers in the 1920s and he is well remembered in Thai diplomatic history.

== Demography ==
The Siamese effective manpower had been in decline since the late Ayutthaya period. The Fall of Ayutthaya in 1767 was the final blow as most Siamese were either deported to Burma or perished in war. The manpower shortage of Siam was exemplified during the Nine Armies' War in 1785, in which Burma sent the total number of 144,000 men to invade Siam who managed to only gather 70,000 men for defenses. D.E. Malloch, who accompanied Henry Burney to Bangkok in 1826, noted that Siam was thinly populated and the Siamese lands could support about twice the size of its population.

=== Manpower management ===
Manpower had been a scarce resource during the early Bangkok period. The Department of Conscription or Registers, the Krom Suratsawadi (กรมสุรัสวดี), was responsible for the record-keeping of able-bodied men eligible for corvée and wars. Krom Suratsawadi recorded the Hangwow registers (บัญชีหางว่าว) – a list of available Phrai commoners and That slaves to be drafted into services. However, pre-modern Siam did not maintain an accurate census of its population. The survey by the court focused on the recruitment of capable manpower not for statistical intelligence. Only able-bodied men were counted on that purpose, excluding women and children and those who had escaped from authority to live in the wilderness of jungles.

The authority of Siamese government extended only to the towns and riverine agricultural lands. Most of the pre-modern Siamese lands were dense tropical jungles roamed by wild animals. Leaving the town for jungles was the most effective way to avoid the corvée obligations for Siamese men. The Siamese court devised the method of Sak Lek (สักเลก) to strictly control the available manpower. The man would be branded with the heated iron cast to create an imprinting tattoo on the back of his hand in the symbol of his responsible department. The Sak Lek enabled prompt identification and prevented the Phrai from escaping government duties. The Sak Lek was traditionally conducted once in a generation, usually once per reign and within Central Siam. King Rama III ordered the Sak Lek of Laos in 1824, which became one of the preceding events of the Anouvong's Lao Rebellion in 1827. Sak Lek of Southern Siamese people were conducted in 1785, 1813 and 1849. Effective manpower control was one of major policies of the Siamese court in order to maintain stability and security.

=== Population ===
Surviving sources on the accurate population of pre-modern Siam does not exist. Only through the estimated projections that the demographic information of pre-modern Siam was revealed. In the first century of the Rattanakosin period, the population of what would become modern Thailand remained relatively static at around 4 million people. Fertility rate was high but life expectancy was averaged to be less than 40 years with infant mortality rate as high as 200 per 1,000 babies. Wars and diseases were major causes of deaths. Men were periodically drafted into warfare. Siamese children died from smallpox yearly and the Cholera epidemics of 1820 and 1849 had claimed 30,000 and 40,000 deaths, respectively.

Bangkok was founded in 1782 as the royal seat and became the primate city of Siam. Bangkok inherited the founding population from Thonburi, which had already been enhanced by the influx of Lao and Cambodian war captives and Chinese and Mon immigrants. Through the early Rattanakosin period, the population of Bangkok was estimated to be around 50,000 people. Chinese immigration was the greatest contributor to the population of Bangkok and Central Siam. By the 1820s, Bangkok had surpassed all other cities in Siam in population size. Others estimated population of major town centres in Central Siam in 1827 included Ayutthaya at 41,350, Chanthaburi at 36,900, Saraburi at 14,320 and Phitsanulok at 5,000 people. Within the Siamese sphere of influence, Chiang Mai was the second most populated city in Rattanakosin Kingdom after Bangkok.

Siam's economy, at least in Central Siam, was liberated from subsistence economy to rice-export-oriented economy through the Bowring Treaty of 1855. This stimulated population growth as surplus food drove more new births to provide labor for the economy. The population of Siam experienced a steady growth after 1850, from around five million people to 8.13 million by 1910. The population of Bangkok was around 100,000 people in 1850 and rose up to 478,994 in 1909. Introduction of Western medicine and establishment of sanitation system in the late nineteenth century greatly improved the quality of life and reduced the chance of deadly epidemics. In 1909, the first official modern nationwide Thai census was conducted.

=== Ethnic immigration ===
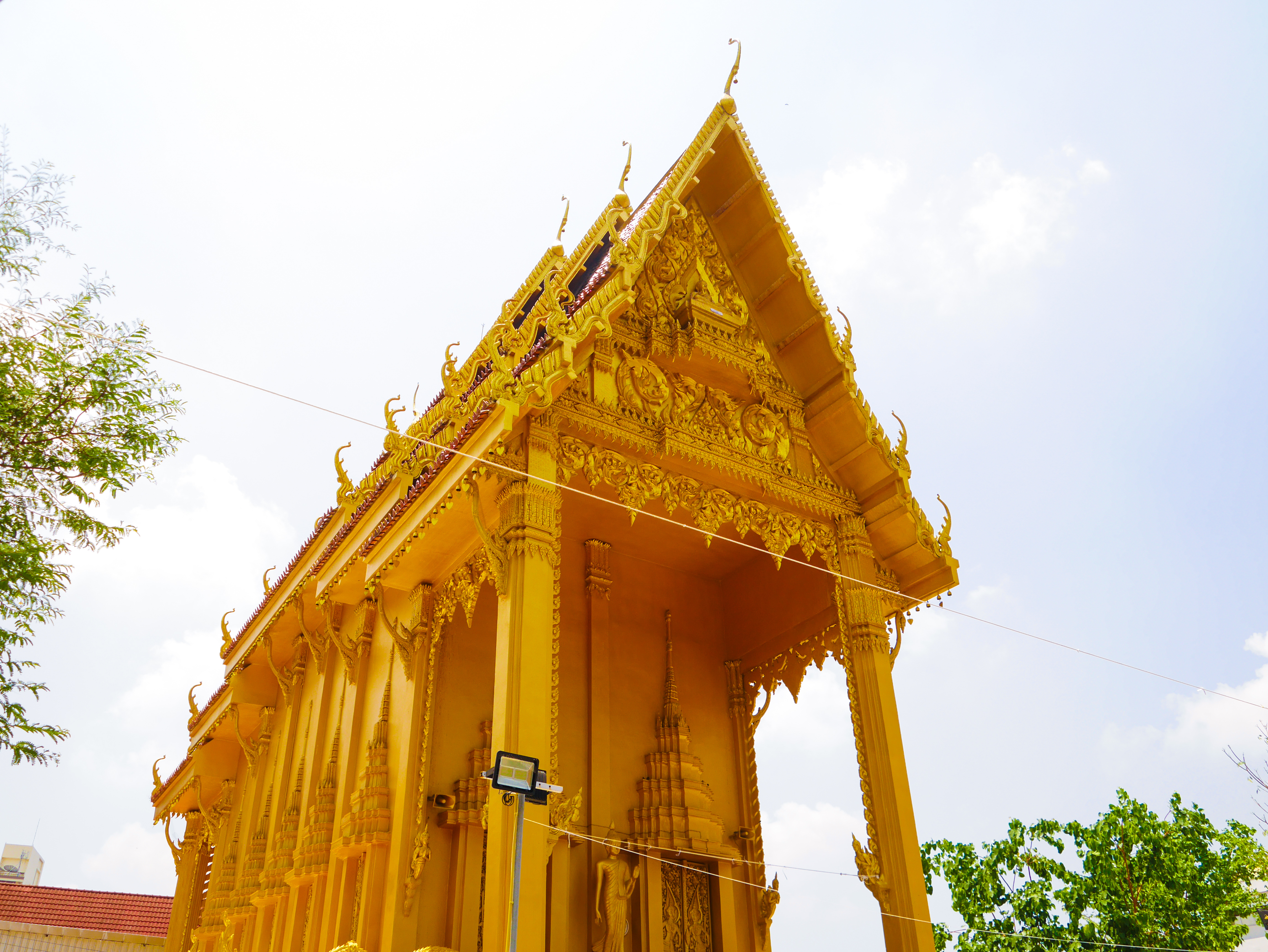
Wat Bang Sai Kai (วัดบางไส้ไก่), in modern Thonburi District of Bangkok, was constructed under the sponsorship of Prince Nanthasen of Vientiane during his exile. The temple itself had been a centre of a Lao community in Bangkok.

Since the Thonburi period, Siam had acquired ethnic population through many campaigns against the neighbouring kingdoms. Ethnic war captives were forcibly relocated. In 1779, when the Siamese forces took Vientiane during the Thonburi period, ten thousands of Lao people from Vientiane were deported to settle in Central Siam in Saraburi and Ratchaburi, where they were known as the Lao Vieng (ลาวเวียง). The Lao elite class, including the princes who were the sons of the Lao king, were settled in Bangkok. In 1804, the Siamese-Lanna forces captured the Burmese-held Chiang Saen. Northern Thai inhabitants of Chiang Saen, which were by that time known as "Lao Phung Dam" (ลาวพุงดำ, the black bellied Lao), were relocated down south to settle in Saraburi and Ratchaburi. The greatest influx of Lao people came in 1828 after the total destruction of Vientiane, which was estimated to be more than 100,000 people. Through the early nineteenth century, there was a gradual Lao population shift from the Mekong region to the Chi-Mun Basin of Isan, leading to the foundation of numerous towns in Isan. In 1833, during the Siamese-Vietnamese War, the Siamese forces took control of Muang Phuan and its whole Phuan population were deported to Siam in order to curb Vietnamese influence. The Lao Phuan people were settled in Central Siam.

During one of the civil wars in Cambodia in 1782, King Ang Eng and his Cambodian retinue were settled in Bangkok. In 1783, Nguyễn Phúc Ánh took refuge and settled in Bangkok along with his Vietnamese followers. Cambodians were deported to Siam in Siamese-Vietnamese conflict events of 1812 and 1833. They were settled in Bangkok and the Prachinburi area. In 1833, during the Siamese expedition to Cochinchina, Christian Vietnamese and Cambodians from Cochinchina were taken to settle in Bangkok in Samsen.

Due to the insurgencies of Malay tributary states against Siam, Malays were deported as war captives to Bangkok on several occasions. In 1786, when Pattani was sacked, the Pattani Malays were deported to settle in Bangkok at Bang Lamphu. In the 1830s, Pattani and Kedah rebellions prompted deportations of 4,000 to 5,000 Malays from the south to settle on the eastern suburbs of Bangkok known as Saensaep and at Nakhon Si Thammarat in the aftermath.

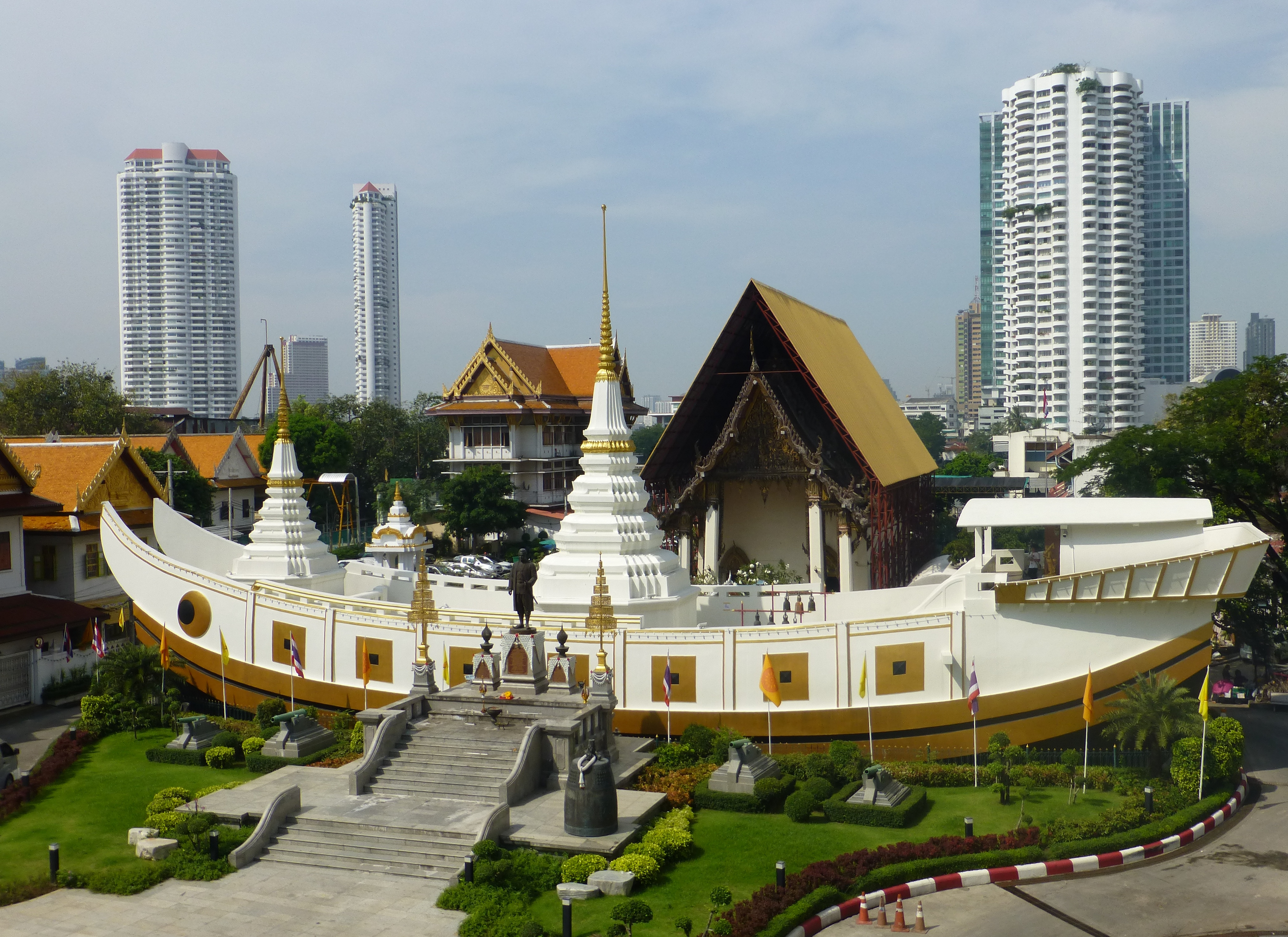
Wat Yannawa was patronised by Nangklao, who ordered the temple enlarged and constructed many new structures within. The temple is shaped like a Chinese junk, to signify the importance of Chinese commerce within Siam during Nangklao's reign.

After the Fall of Hanthawaddy Kingdom in 1757, the Mon people of Lower Burma suffered from genocide by the Burmese and had taken refuge in Siam since the late Ayutthaya period. Another failed Mon rebellion caused an influx of Mon people in 1774 in Thonburi period. In 1814, Mon people of Martaban rose up against an oppressive Burmese governor and the 40,000 of Mon people migrated through the Three Pagodas Pass to Siam. King Rama II sent his young son Prince Mongkut to welcome the Mons at Kanchanaburi on that occasion.

Chinese immigration was the greatest contributor to the population growth of Central Siam. They were increasingly integrated into Siamese society over time. Crawfurd mentioned 31,500 male registered Chinese taxpayers in Bangkok in his visit in 1822. Malloch stated that, during his stay in 1826, 12,000 Chinese people arrived in Siam annually from Guangdong and Fujian Provinces. The Chinese settlers were adorned with special treatment by the royal court. Unlike other ethnicities, the Chinese were spared from corvée obligations and wartime drafts on the condition that they paid a certain amount of tax known as Phuk Pee (ผูกปี้). Once the tax was paid, they were given an amulet to be tied around their wrists as the symbol. The first Phuk Pee was conducted in the reign of King Rama II. The Chinese settlers played a very important role in the development of Siamese economy in the early Bangkok period. The unrestricted Chinese were free to move around the kingdom, serving as commercial middlemen and became the first 'bourgeoisie' class of Siam.

== Society ==
Despite important political changes, the traditional Siamese society in the early Rattanakosin period remained largely unchanged from the Ayutthaya period. Theravada Buddhism served as the main ideology on which the societal principles were based. The king and the royal dynasty stood atop of the social pyramid. Below him was the common populace who were either the Nai (นาย), who were the leader of their subordinates and held official posts, or Phrai commoners and That slaves, though there were substantial degree of social mobility. Ethnic immigrants became Phrai and That also, with the exception of the Chinese who had paid the Phuk Pee tax.

Aerial night photo of Wat Phichai Yat, a Buddhist temple on the Thonburi side of Bangkok, commissioned by Chao Phraya Phichaiyat (That Bunnag). Large temple projects patronized and built by the nobility was also typical of the early Rattanakosin period.

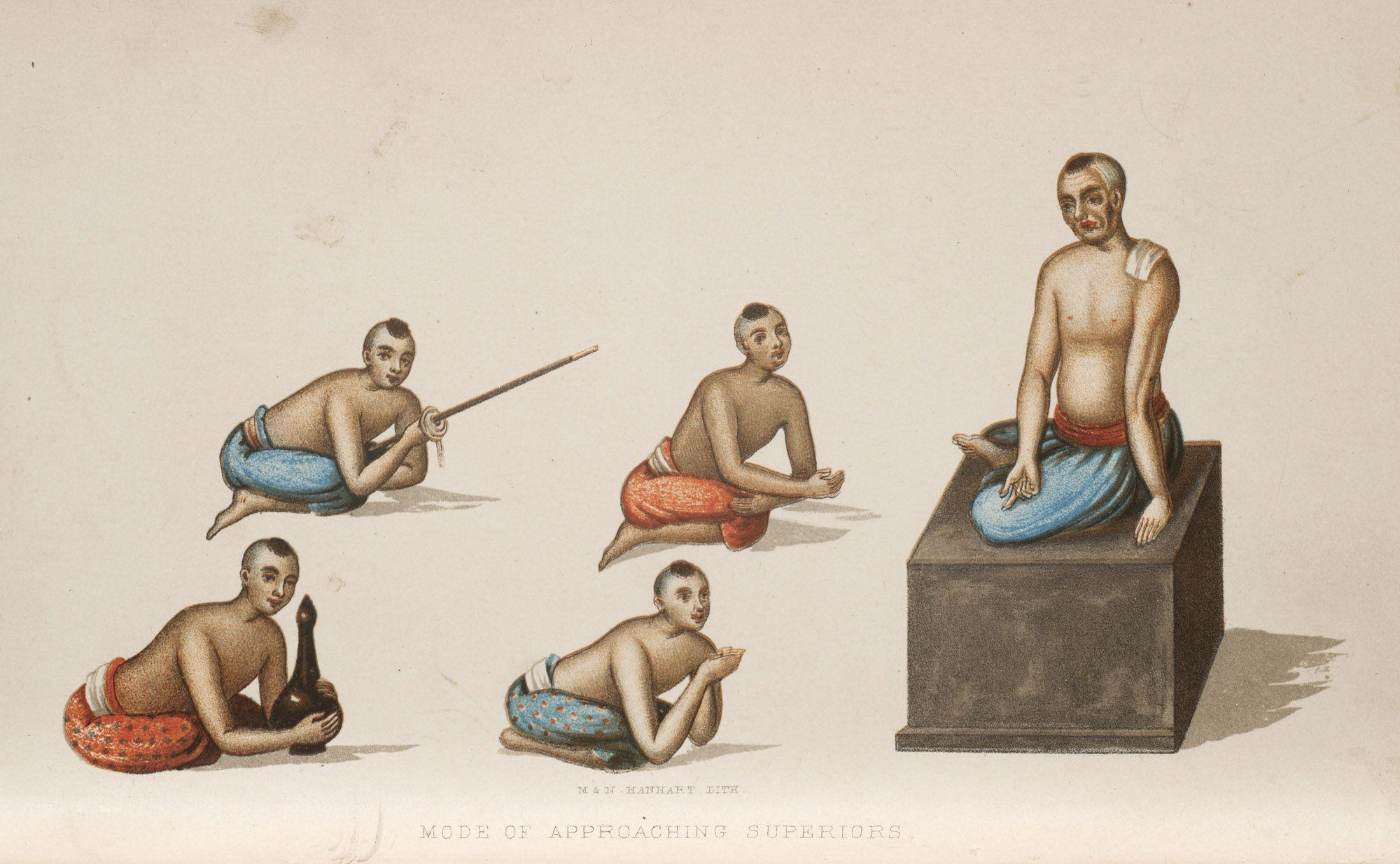
Mode of approaching superiors in Siam 1855 by John Bowring

Sakdina was the theoretical and numerical rank accorded to every men of all classes in the kingdom, except the king himself, as described in the Three Seals Law. Sakdina determined each man's exact level in the social hierarchy. For example, the Sakdina of the nobility ranged from 400 rai to 10,000 rai each. The Sakdina of a basic Buddhist monk was 400 rai. The Sakdina of a slave was 5 rai. The traditional Siamese society was roughly stratified into four distinct social classes;

- The royalty, Chao; including the king and the royal family
- The nobility, Khunnang (ขุนนาง); The nobility referred to any men who held a government position with the Sakdina of 400 rai or more and his family. Siamese bureaucratic positions were not hereditary, though some positions were conserved among prominent lineages due to familial and personal connections. The nobility were the Nai who controlled Phrai subordinates. A noble and his family were exempted from the corvée. The distinction between the Lower Nobility and the commoners were indecisive. Commoners, at times, were appointed to the nobility by volunteering himself as a leader of a group. The Siamese court recruited officials through personal connections. Any noblemen who wished to start his bureaucratic career should give himself into the service of one of the existing superiors to win the favor and support. Through the recommendations and connections of that superior, the novice official would find his place the bureaucracy. The system of connections maintained the noble status among the connected individuals, though the nobility class itself was not inclusive. Nobles received Biawat (เบี้ยหวัด) stipends as income. When a noble died, his belongings and estates were organized and reported to the royal court who would take a part of the wealth as inheritance tax.

The royalty and the nobility, who had authority over and commanded the commoners, were collectively called Munnai (มูลนาย).

- Commoners, Phrai (ไพร่); Phrai commoners constituted the majority of the population and were under the control of Munnai. They were mostly agricultural producers. All able-bodied male Phrai, excluding the people of tributary kingdoms, were required to periodically serve the royal court in corvée labors and wars – a form of universal conscription. Due to manpower shortage, King Rama I ordered all available male Phrai to be registered. The Sak Lek or the conscription tattooing was imposed on the registered Phrai to assign their duties. Boys whose height reached two sok and one khuep were eligible for the Sak Lek. Unregistered men were denied legal existence and would not be protected by any laws. While men were subjected to periodic government services, women were not recruited. There were three types of Phrai;
  - Direct royal servants, Phrai luang (ไพร่หลวง); Phrai luang were under the services of various functional departments of the royal court. In Ayutthaya, Phrai luang served alternating months, the Khao Duean (เข้าเดือน), for the royal court, six months per year in total, and were allowed freetime to return to their farmlands. In the reign of King Rama I, Phrai luang served alternating two months and became alternating three months in subsequent reigns. Royal services included garrison maintenance and drills, palace and temple constructions, participation in royal ceremonies and warfare.
  - Distributed servants, Phrai som (ไพร่สม); Phrai som were granted by the king to the princes according to the ranks and honors of the princes. The Phrai som served under services of their princes. However, due to the manpower shortage, King Rama I ordered the Phrai som to serve additional one-month per year in direct royal service.
  - Taxpayer servants, Phrai suai (ไพร่ส่วย); Those Phrai who resided in distant regions and whose journey to periodically serve was impractical can pay the tax called Suai (ส่วย) instead of physical service. The Suai were usually local commodities and valuables, which the royal court would collect and sell to the foreigners as a source of revenue.
- Slaves, That (ทาส); The That slaves were, by law, considered properties of their masters that can be traded, inherited and given to other people without That's consent. In contrast to Phrai who were allowed freetime, That slaves were always in the service of the masters and usually lived in the same quarters. Both men and women can be slaves. The majority of the That rooted in the economic cause. Those commoners who faced financial problems could "sell" themselves to become slaves to earn money. Those who defaulted the debts would become slaves of their lenders. Parents and husbands could also sell their children or wives to become slaves. When a slave managed to repay the debts, the slave would be freed (Thai ไท, to be free). Only two types of slaves that were lifelong and irredeemable. They were That Nai Ruean Bia (ทาสในเรือนเบี้ย) who were born from slave parents in their services, and That Chaleoi (ทาสเชลย) or the war captive slaves. If a slave woman became a wife of the master or his son, she would be freed. If a slave was captured by the enemy troops and managed to break free and return, the slave would be freed.

Outside the social pyramid were the Buddhist monks, who were revered and respected by the Siamese of all classes including the king. The Buddhist monks were exempted from corvée and any forms of taxation as, according to the vinaya, monks could not produce or earn wealth on his own.

== Religion ==
=== Theravada Buddhism ===
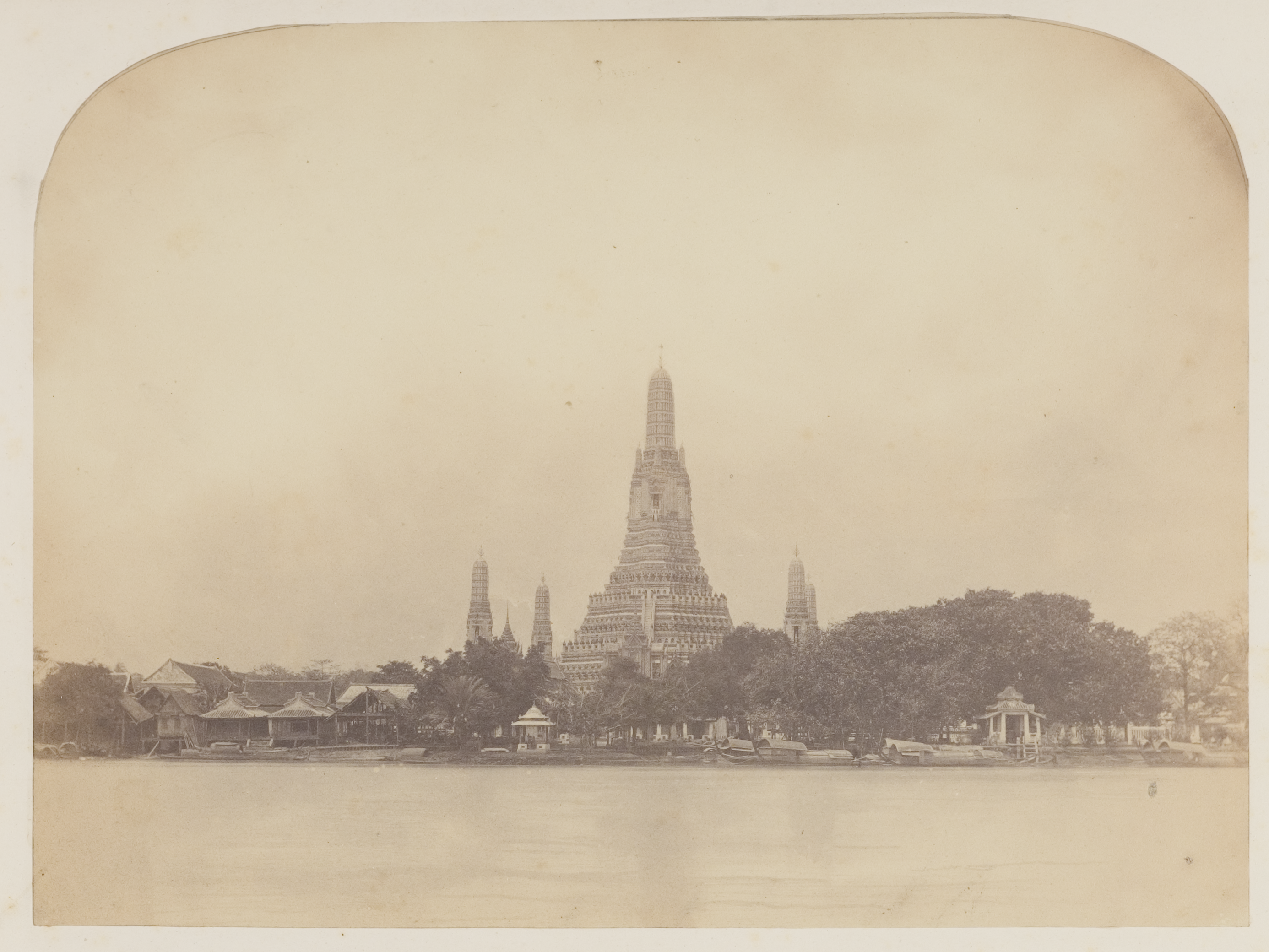
Photograph of Wat Arun in 1862. A principal temple of the Thonburi and Rattanakosin periods; the temple's iconic central prang was later rebuilt to its present appearance during the reign of Rama III.

Maintenance of orthodox Theravadin Sangha monkhood was one of the main policies of Siamese royal court in the early Rattanakosin period. King Rama I ordered the high-ranking monks to convene the Buddhist council to recompile the Tripitaka Pāli canon in 1788, which was regarded as the ninth Buddhist council according to Thai narrative. King Rama I renovated many local existing temples of Bangkok into fine temples. Important monastic temples of Bangkok included Wat Mahathat, Wat Chetuphon, Wat Arun, and Wat Rakhang. In the reign of King Rama III, massive number of nearly seventy Buddhist temples were either constructed or renovated in Bangkok, including both royal and demotic temples. In Early Bangkok, there were two Theravadin denominations: the mainstream Siamese Theravada and the Mon tradition. Influx of Mon people from Burma brought, along with them, the Mon Buddhist traditions and Mon monks themselves.

A Siamese man, regardless of social class, was expected to be ordained as a monk at some parts of his life. Usually, a young man at the age of twenty temporarily became a monk as a part of coming-of-age customs. Women could not become monks, though she can shave her hair and wear white robes but would not officially be regarded as a monk. There were two monastic paths: the doctrinal 'city-dwelling' Khamavasi (คามวาสี) that focused on Theravada philosophy and Pāli learning and the meditational 'forest-dwelling' Aranyavasi (อรัญวาสี) that focused on mental exercise and meditation practices. Phra Yanasangvorn Suk was an influential monk in the 1810s who specialized in meditational Vipatsana practices, which was interpreted by some modern scholars as the Tantric Theravada.

Monastic governance was organized into a hierarchical ecclesiastic bureaucracy. Sangharaja or Buddhist hierophant or Supreme Patriarch, appointed by the king, was the head of Siamese monkhood. Sangharaja was treated as a prince with rachasap used on him. Below Sangharaja was the ecclesiastic hierarchy with ranks and positions nominated by the king. The Sangharaja would be entitled Somdet Phra Ariyawongsa Katayan and took official residence at Wat Mahathat. Royal court controlled the Buddhist Sangha to regulate and preserve traditions that were considered orthodox through the Krom Sankhakari (กรมสังฆการี) or Department of Monastic Affairs that had authorities to investigate Vinaya violations and to defrock monks.

==== Thammayut ====
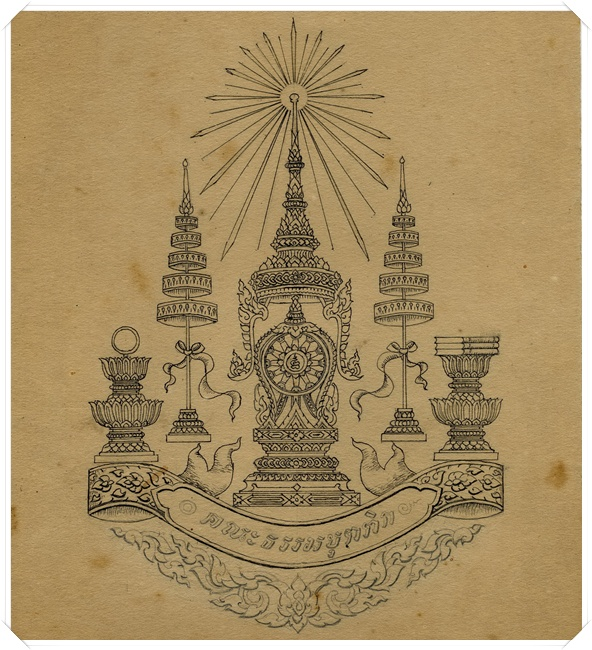
Old Dhammayuttika seal

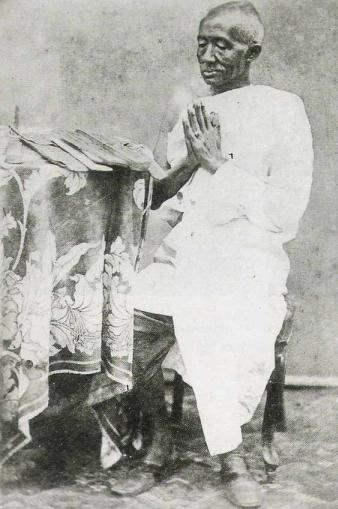
King Mongkut observing Buddhist precepts (1867)

Upon ordination, the Buddhist monk would take the vow of 227 precepts as the Vinaya or law regulating daily life conducts. Valid ordination required presentation of existing genuine monks to transmit the monkhood onto the new monk. Buddhist monks traced their lineage of ordinations back to Buddha himself. In the early Bangkok period, the Siamese authority faced dilemma in which Buddhist laws declined as the violations of Vinaya were widespread including accumulation of personal wealth and having children. Many attempts by the royal court were made to purify the monkhood and purged any of 'non-conformist' monks. In 1824, the young Prince Mongkut was ordained as a monk. However, his father King Rama II died fifteen days later and his elder half-brother Prince Chetsadabodin took the throne as King Rama III. Prince Mongkut stayed in monkhood to avoid political intrigues and pursued religious and intellectual life. Prince Mongkut soon found that the mainstream Siamese monkhood was then generally laxed in Vinaya. He then met Phra Sumethmuni a Mon monk in 1830 and discovered that Mon traditions was more strict and closer to the supposed original Buddha's Vinaya and, therefore, the authentic lineage traceable to Buddha. In 1830, Prince Mongkut moved from Wat Mahathat to Wat Samorai and officially began the Thammayut or Dhammayuttika (ธรรมยุต 'adhering to the dharma') movement. He studied and followed Mon traditions. Prince Mongkut re-ordained as a monk in Mon tradition at Wat Samorai, where the Thammayut accumulated followers. The mainstream Siamese monks then became known as the Mahanikai (มหานิกาย). Robes of Thammayut monks were brownish-red in colour and worn over both shoulders in Mon style, while the robe colour of Mahanikai monks was bright-orange. Thammayut forbid the monks to touch money. New Pāli pronunciation and the routine of daily Buddhist chanting were also introduced. Prince Mongkut was appointed as the abbot of Wat Baworn Nivet, which became the headquarter of Thammayut, in 1836.

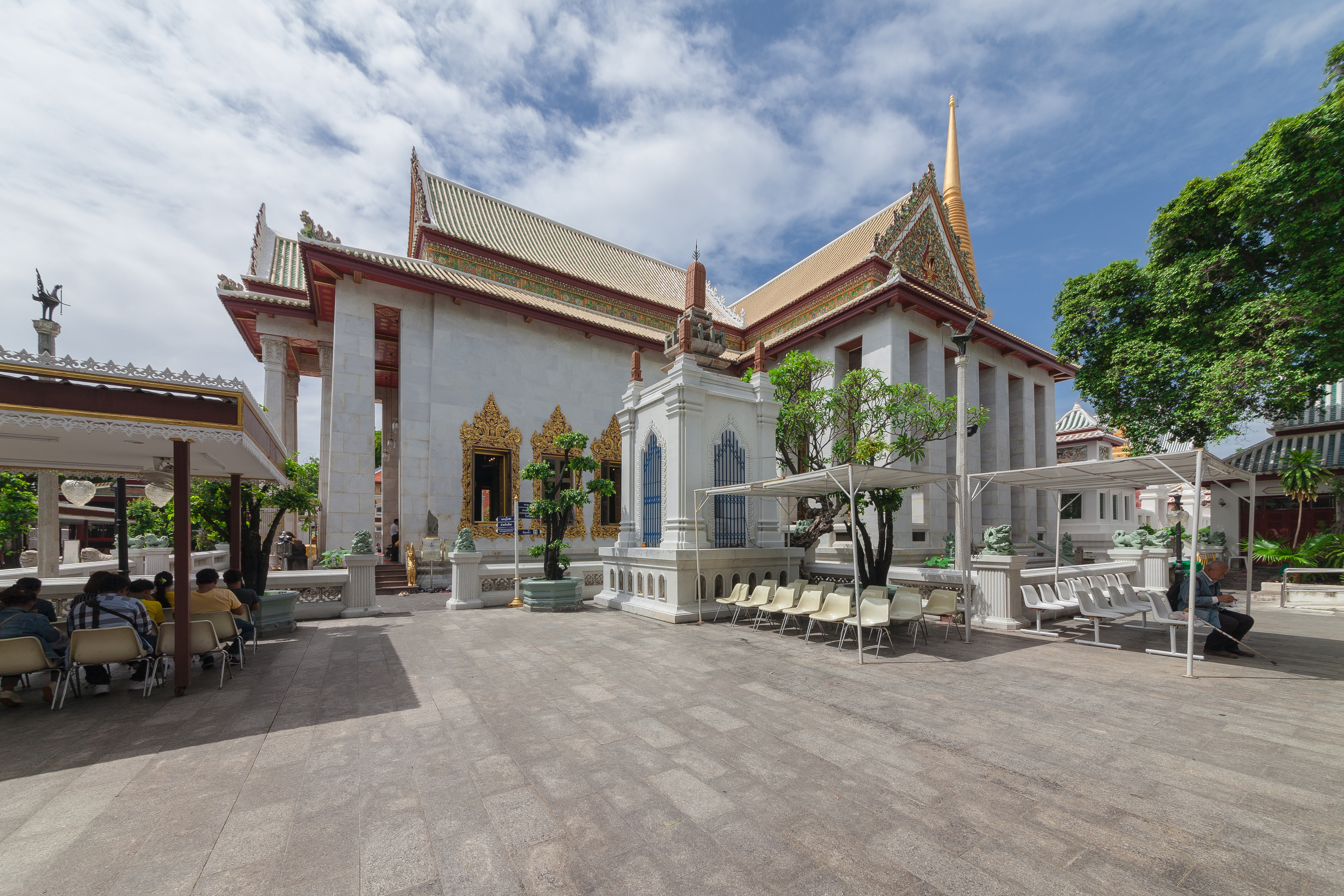
Wat Bowon Nivet, where Prince Mongkut was the abbot from 1836 to 1851, became the administrative headquarter of modern Thammayut order.

The royal court had mixed reactions with the Thammayut. King Rama III tolerated Thammayut but commented on the Mon-style robes. Prince Rakronnaret, who oversaw the Krom Sankhakari, was the main opponent of Thammayut. Prince Mongkut acquainted himself with Westerners in Bangkok, including Bishop Pallegoix, and learnt Western sciences and philosophy that would later influence Mongkut's rational rethinking and Buddhist realism in his Thammayut ideals. Thammayut emphasized the importance of Pāli learning as the sole doctrinal source and considered meditations, magical practices and folklore syncretism as mythical. In 1851, Prince Mongkut decided to order Thammayut monks to abandon Mon-style robes due to pressures. Prince Mongkut went to become the king in 1851 and the Mon-style monk robes were reinstated. The leadership of Thammayut passed to Prince Pavares Variyalongkorn.

=== Christianity ===
==== Catholic mission ====
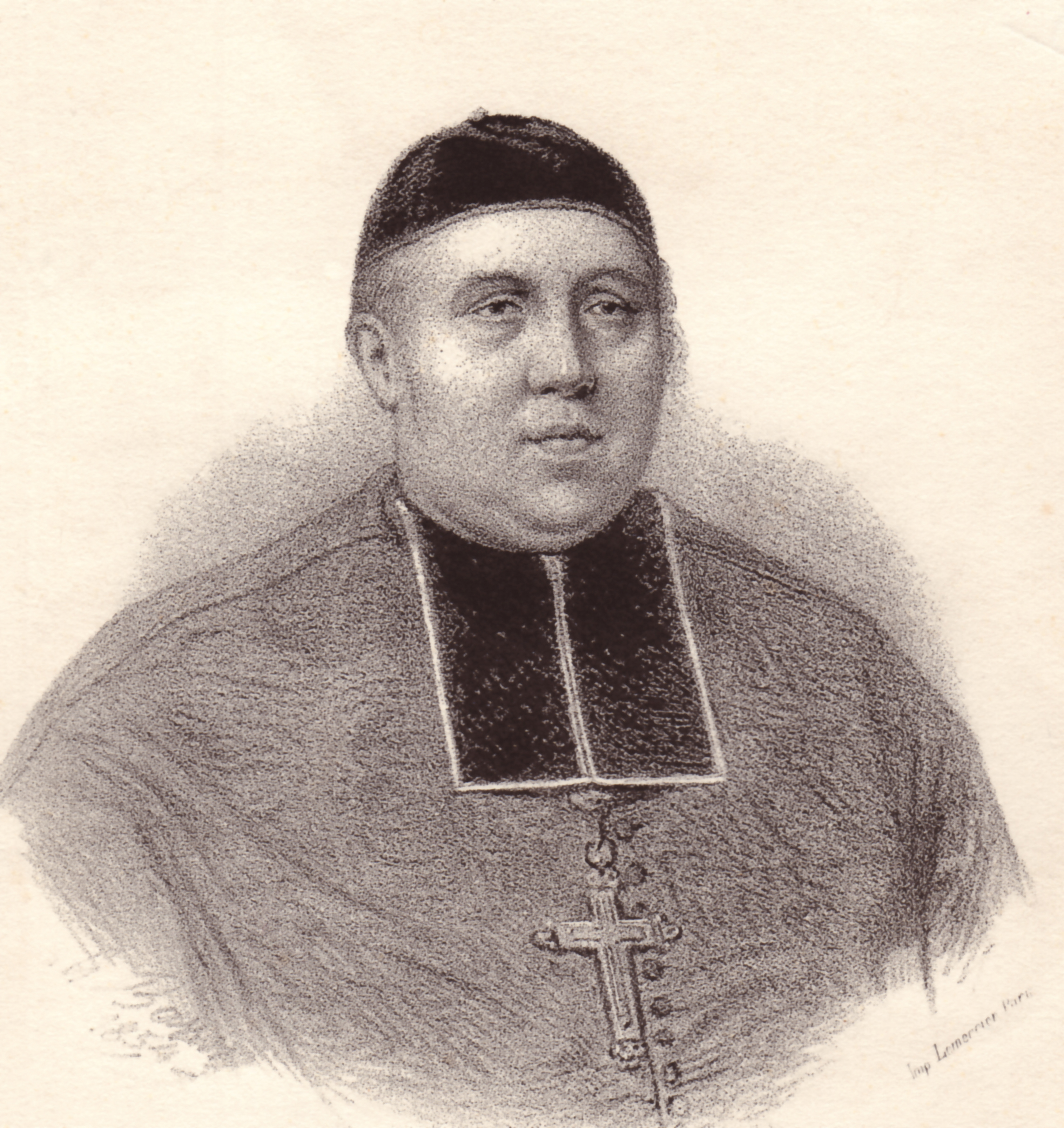
Jean-Baptist Pallegoix was the apostolic vicar of Eastern Siam from 1841 to 1862. He was known for his works Description du Royaume Thai and Dictionarium linguae and also for his close companionship with King Mongkut.

Since 1730 in Ayutthaya Period, Siam had forbidden Christian catechisms to be written in Siamese alphabets. Siamese, Mon and Lao-Lanna people were also forbidden to convert, on the pain of death. In pre-modern Siam, religion was closely tied with ethnicity. Westerners were allowed to practice their religion freely in Siam but conversion of native people was forbidden as it deviated from ethnocultural norms. In 1779, King Taksin of Thonburi ordered the expulsion of three French Catholic priests: Olivier-Simon Le Bon the vicar apostolic of Siam, Joseph-Louis Coudé and Arnaud-Antoine Garnault from Siam for their refusals to drink the sacred water to swear fealty to the king. Le Bon retired to Goa where he died in 1780. Coudé left for Kedah and he was appointed the new vicar apostolic of Siam in 1782. Coudé returned to Bangkok in 1783. Coudé was pardoned by King Rama I and was allowed to skip the lustral water drinking ceremony. Coudé took the vicarate seat at Santa Cruz church in Kudi Chin district. However, as French bishops continued to monopolize vicarate position in Siam, Coudé faced oppositions from the Portuguese who formed the majority of Catholics in Bangkok. Coudé left Bangkok for Kedah where he died in 1785 and was succeeded by Garnault in 1787. Vicars apostolic of Siam in the early Bangkok period usually spent most of tenure in Kedah, Penang, and Mergui due to resistance from the Portuguese in Bangkok who always requested for Portuguese bishops from either Goa or Macau. Chantaburi arose as the centre of immigrated Vietnamese Catholics. Kedah, Malacca, Singapore and Tenasserim were added to the territory of apostolic vicarate of Siam in 1840.

Jean-Paul Courvezy, the vicar apostolic of Siam, chose Jean-Baptiste Pallegoix as his coadjutor in 1838. Courvezy moved to stay permanently in Singapore, leaving Pallegoix in Bangkok. In 1841, in accordance with the papal brief Univerci Dominici, the apostolic vicarate of Siam was divided into apostolic vicarates of Eastern Siam, corresponding to Siam proper, and Western Siam corresponding to Malay peninsula. Courvezy remained as the vicar apostolic of Western Siam at Singapore, while Pallegoix was appointed the vicar apostolic of Eastern Siam in Bangkok. Pallegoix was the first vicar apostolic to spend most of his time in Bangkok. As Siamese people were forbidden to convert, episcopal authority in Siam oversaw Christians of foreign origins. In 1841, there were total of 4,300 recorded Catholics in Siam with 1,700 Vietnamese Catholics in St. Francis Xavier Church in Bangkok, 700 Portuguese-Cambodian Catholics in Immaculate Conception Church, 500 Portuguese-Siamese Catholics in the Santa Cruz Church and another 500 at Holy Rosary Calvário Church and 800 Vietnamese Catholics in Chanthaburi. In 1849, during the Cholera epidemic, King Rama III ordered the Christian churches to release domesticated animals and feed them to make merits to appease the diseases according to Buddhist beliefs. Missionaries did not comply and incurred the anger of the king. Pallegoix then decided to release the animals per royal orders. King Rama III was satisfied but ordered the expulsions of eight priests who refused to comply. In 1852, King Mongkut personally wrote to the expelled eight missionaries urging them to return and promising not to impose Buddhist beliefs on missionaries in the future. Pope Pius IX issued thanks to King Mongkut by papal briefs Pergrata Nobis (1852) and Summa quidem (1861). Mongkut declared freedom of religion for his subjects in 1858, ending more than a century of conversion ban and opened new era of native Siamese Christian converts.

==== Protestant mission ====
In 1828 saw the arrival of first two Protestant missionaries in Bangkok: British Jacob Tomlin from London Missionary Society and German Lutheran Karl Gützlaff. Tomlin stayed only for nine months and Gützlaff stayed until 1833. Protestant missions in Siam was then very nascent. American missionaries from ABCFM and Baptist missionaries arrived in this period. American missionaries were called 'physicians' by the Siamese because they usually practiced Western medicine. Though their missionary works were largely unclimactic, they contributed to Thai history by the introduction of Western sciences and technologies. These included Dan Beach Bradley (หมอบรัดเล, arrived in 1835), who introduced surgery, printing and vaccination to Siam, Jesse Caswell (arrived in 1839 together with Asa Hemenway), who closely associated with Prince Mongkut, John Taylor Jones (arrived in 1833) and J.H. Chandley (หมอจันดเล, arrived in 1843).

=== Islam ===
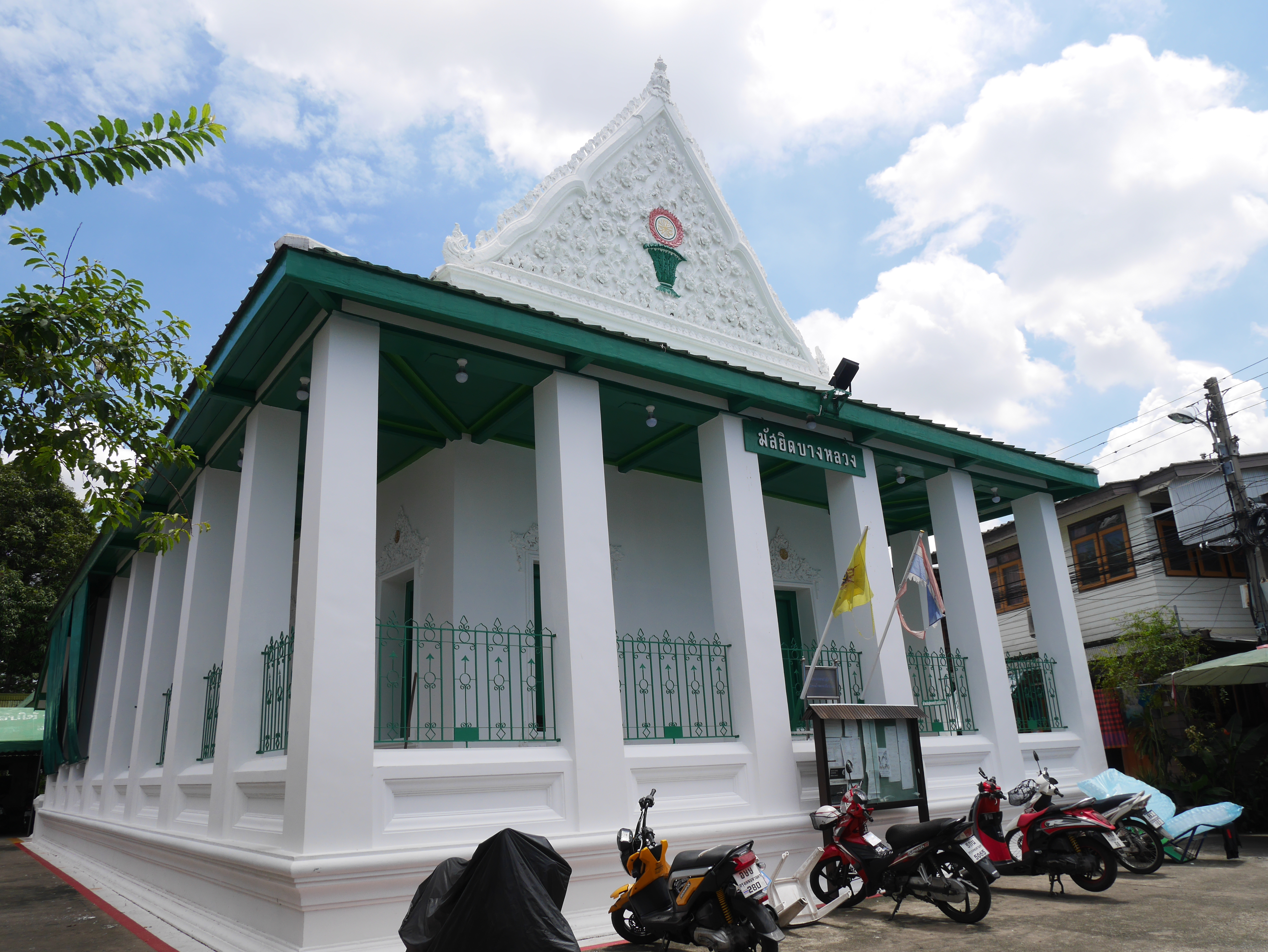
Bangluang Mosque in Kudi Chin, built by a Muslim named Toh Yi c. 1784, was renovated into distinct Thai style in the reign of King Rama III.

After the fall of the Ayutthaya Kingdom and failed attempts to reacquire the portage route long by the Chakri rulers, Persian and Muslim influence in Siam declined as Chinese influence within the kingdom grew. Despite this, however, the Muslim community remained a sizable minority in Bangkok, particularly in the first hundred years or so.

After the Fall of Ayutthaya, Shiite Muslims of Persian descent from Ayutthaya settled in the Kudi Chin district. 'Kudi' (กุฎี) was the Siamese term for Shiite Imambarah, though it could also refer to a mosque. Muslim communities in Siam were led by Phraya Chula Ratchamontri (พระยาจุฬาราชมนตรี), the position that had been held by a single lineage of Shiite Persian descendant of Sheikh Ahmad since 1656 and until 1939. Phraya Chula Ratchamontri was also the Lord of the Right Pier who headed the Kromma Tha Khwa (กรมท่าขวา) or the Department of the Right Pier that dealt with trade and affairs with Muslim Indians and Middle Easterners. Shiite Persians were elite Muslims who served as officials in Kromma Tha Khwa. Shiites in Siam were characterized by their ritual of the Mourning of Muharram or Chao Sen ceremony (Imam Hussein was called Chao Sen เจ้าเซ็น in Siamese). King Rama II ordered the Muharram rituals to be performed before him in the royal palace in 1815 and 1816. Kudi Mosques were established and concentrated on the West bank of Chao Phraya River in Thonburi. Important Kudis in Thonburi included Tonson Mosque (Kudi Yai or the Great Kudi, oldest mosque in Bangkok), Kudi Charoenphat (Kudi Lang, the Lower Kudi) and Bangluang Mosque (Kudi Khao or the White Kudi).

The Siamese used the term Khaek (แขก) for the Islamic peoples in general. In traditional Siam, religion was closely tied with ethnicity. Muslims in Siam included the Sunni Khaek Cham and Khaek Malayu (Malays) and Shiite Khaek Ma-ngon or Khaek Chao Sen, referring to Persians.

== Military ==
The Burmese Wars and the Fall of Ayutthaya in 1767 prompted the Siamese to adopt new tactics. Less defensive strategies and effective manpower control contributed to Siamese military successes against her traditional enemies. Acquisition of Western flintlock firearms through diplomatic and private purchases was crucial.

In wartime, all court officials and ministers, civilian or military, were expected to lead armies in battle. The bureaucratic apparatus would turn into war command hierarchy with the king as supreme commander and ministers becoming war generals. There was a specific martial law regulating the war conducts. A general defeated by the enemy in battlefield would be, in theory, subjected to death penalty. In the offensives, auspicious date and time were set to begin marching. Brahmanistic ceremony of cutting trees with similar names to the enemy was performed, while the army marched through a gate with Brahmins blessing with sacred water.

Siamese armies in the early Bangkok period consisted mostly of conscripted militias, who might or might not go through military training. There was also a professional standing army – the Krom Asa (กรมอาสา) – but its role in warfare was largely diminished in comparison to the Ayutthaya period due to the manpower shortage. The Phrai militia infantry, who were armed with melee weapons such as swords, spears or javelin or matchlock firearms formed the backbone of Siamese armies. Regiments also indicated social hierarchy, with nobility on horseback and the king on an elephant, while commoners were on foot. Krom Phra Asawarat (กรมพระอัศวราช) was responsible for horse-keeping for royal elite troops, while Krom Khotchaban (กรมคชบาล) was responsible for taking care of royal elephants.

There were ethnic regiments that were assigned with special tasks. For example, the Krom Asa Cham (กรมอาสาจาม), the Muslim Cham-Malay regiment that took responsibilities in naval warfare and the Mon regiment that served as Burmese-Siamese border patrol. The Mon regiment played crucial role in surveillance of the borders with Burma due to their familiarity with the area and would provide timely alerts of imminent Burmese incursion to the Bangkok court. The members of the Mon regiment were usually Mon immigrants who had been escaping the Burmese rule into Siam since the Thonburi period.

=== Weapons and artillery ===
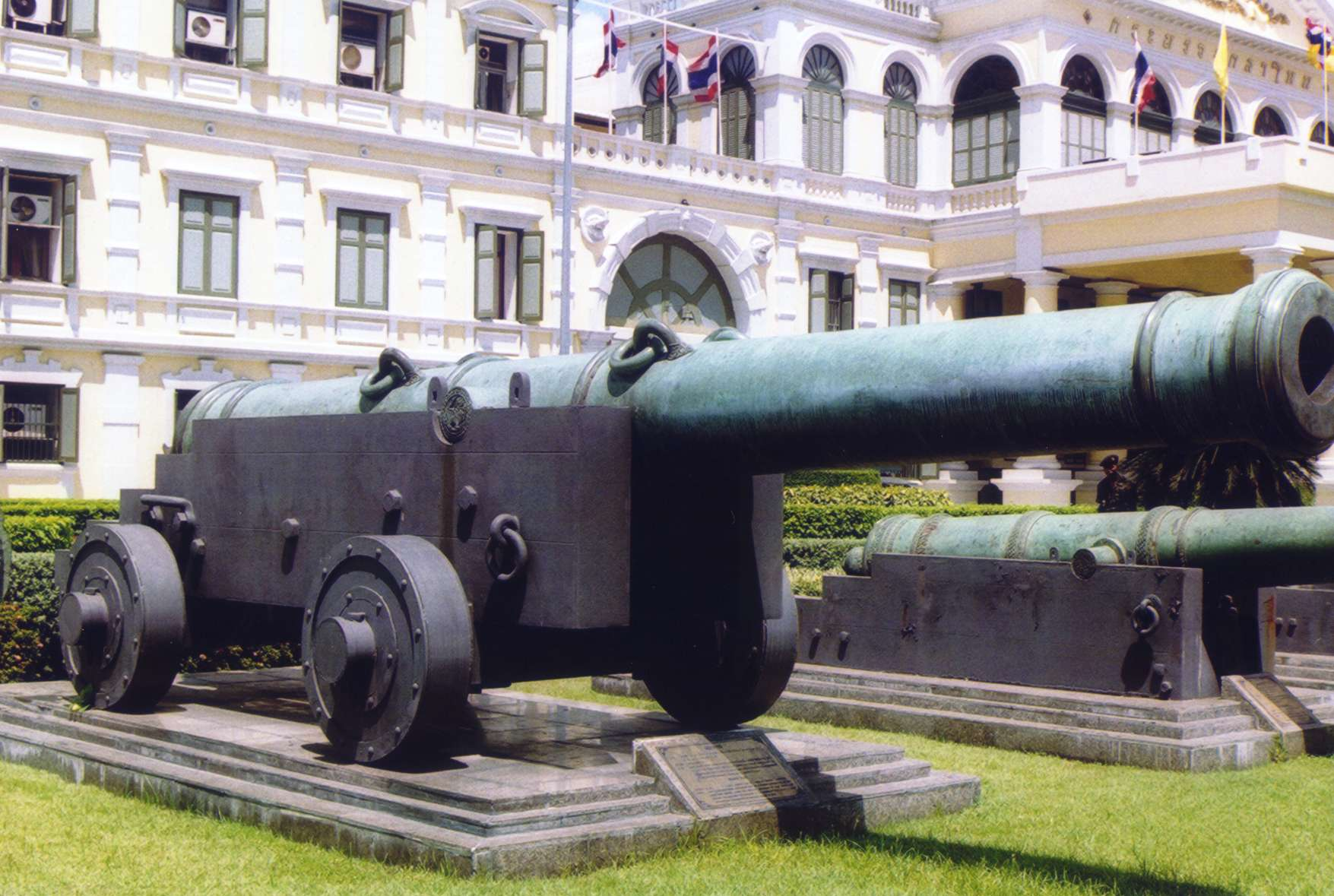
Phaya Tani, taken from Pattani in 1786 to Bangkok, an example of a native bronze cannon now placed in front of Thai Ministry of Defence

The Portuguese introduced matchlock arquebus to Siam in the sixteenth century. The Portuguese and other Europeans filled in positions in the arquebusier regiment known as Krom Farang Maen Peun (กรมฝรั่งแม่นปืน). Though the Siamese were unable to produce firearms, European traders provided unrelenting sources of firearms. Captured enemy ammunition was another source of supply. Firearms usage later spread to native Siamese soldiers who received training from European arquebusiers.

The Siamese were exposed to flintlock muskets from French soldiers visiting Siam in the seventeenth century during the reign of King Narai. Flintlock muskets produced twice firing frequency in comparison to matchlock arquebus. However, like other kingdoms in the Far East, flintlock firearms remained rare commodity and were acquired through purchases from Westerners. Francis Light the British merchant, who had been residing in Thalang or Phuket Island from 1765 to 1786 when he moved to Penang, had been a major supplier of firearms to the Siamese court. During the Nine Armies' War in 1785, Light provided the defenders of Thalang with muskets. Light also gave 1,400 muskets to the Siamese court, earning him the title Phraya Ratcha Kapitan. In 1792, the Samuha Kalahom asked to buy muskets and gunpowder from Francis Light. Flintlock muskets were usually reserved for the elite troops and those who could afford. Krom Phra Saengpuen (กรมพระแสงปืน), was responsible for the keeping and training of firearms. Royal court strictly controlled the firearm trade in Siam. Firearms could only be purchased by the royal court and unpurchased firearms should be taken back.

The Siamese had been able to cast their own cannons since the Ayutthaya period. Native Siamese large muzzleloader cannons were called Charong (จ่ารงค์), which were made of bronze and usually 4–5 inches in calibre. Charong cannons were put on city walls or on warships. Bariam cannons (บาเรียม from Malay meriam) were European-produced cast-iron cannons with relatively larger calibre and shorter barrel. Barium cannons inflicted high damages on the battlefields and were sought after to purchase from Westerners by the court. Small breechloader cannons were also used. In the reign of King Rama III, the Siamese learned to produce small cast-iron cannons from the Chinese. In 1834, Christian Vietnamese from Cochinchina immigrated to settle in Bangkok and formed the Vietnamese firearm regiment that specialized in cannons and muskets.

In the early Rattanakosin period, Siam accumulated cannons and firearms. In 1807, there were total 2,500 functioning cannons in Siam, with 1,200 of them stationed in Bangkok, 1,100 distributed to provinces and the last 200 installed on 16 royal warships. The total number of firearms in Siam in 1827 were over 57,000.

=== Navy ===
Before 1852, Siam did not have a standing navy. Most of the Continental Southeast Asian warfare was land-based or riverine. When a naval warfare was initiated, the authority would gather native Siamese riverine barges and, if possible, Western galleons or Chinese junks. The Siamese relied on either Chinese or Malay junks for seafaring activities. Commercial and war vessels were used interchangeably. The navy was manned by the Krom Asa Cham or the Cham-Malay regiment who possessed naval knowledge. The naval commander would be either Phraya Ratchawangsan, the leader of Krom Asa Cham, or Phrakhlang, the Minister of Trade.

Growing powers of the British and the Vietnamese in the 1820s urged Siam to engage in naval preparations against possible incursions from sea. Siamese temporary fleets composed of sampans, which were for riverine and coastal campaigns and either constructed or levied. Siamese warships were essentially Chinese junks armed with Charong cannons. In the 1820s, Chao Phraya Nakhon Noi maintained his dock at Trang and became an important Siamese shipbuilder. In 1828, Nakhon Noi constructed augmented Chinese junks rigged with Western masts. These Chinese-Western fusion war junks were used during the Battle of Vàm Nao in 1833 where they faced large Vietnamese 'mobile fort' Định Quốc war junks armed with heavy cannons. King Rama III then ordered the construction of Vietnamese-style mobile-fort junks in 1834. Prince Isaret (later known as Pinklao) and Chuang Bunnag pioneered the construction of western-style seafaring ships. In 1835, Chuang Bunnag successfully constructed Ariel (Thai name Klaew Klang Samutr) as the first native brig, while Prince Isaret constructed Fairy (Thai name Phuttha Amnat) as a barque in 1836. However, the barques and brigantines were already outdated by the mid-nineteenth century in favor of steamships. Robert Hunter, a British merchant in Bangkok, brought a steamboat to Bangkok for the royal court to see in 1844 but King Rama III refused to buy the ship due to overpricing.

== Culture ==
=== Art and architecture ===
==== Continuation from Ayutthaya ====
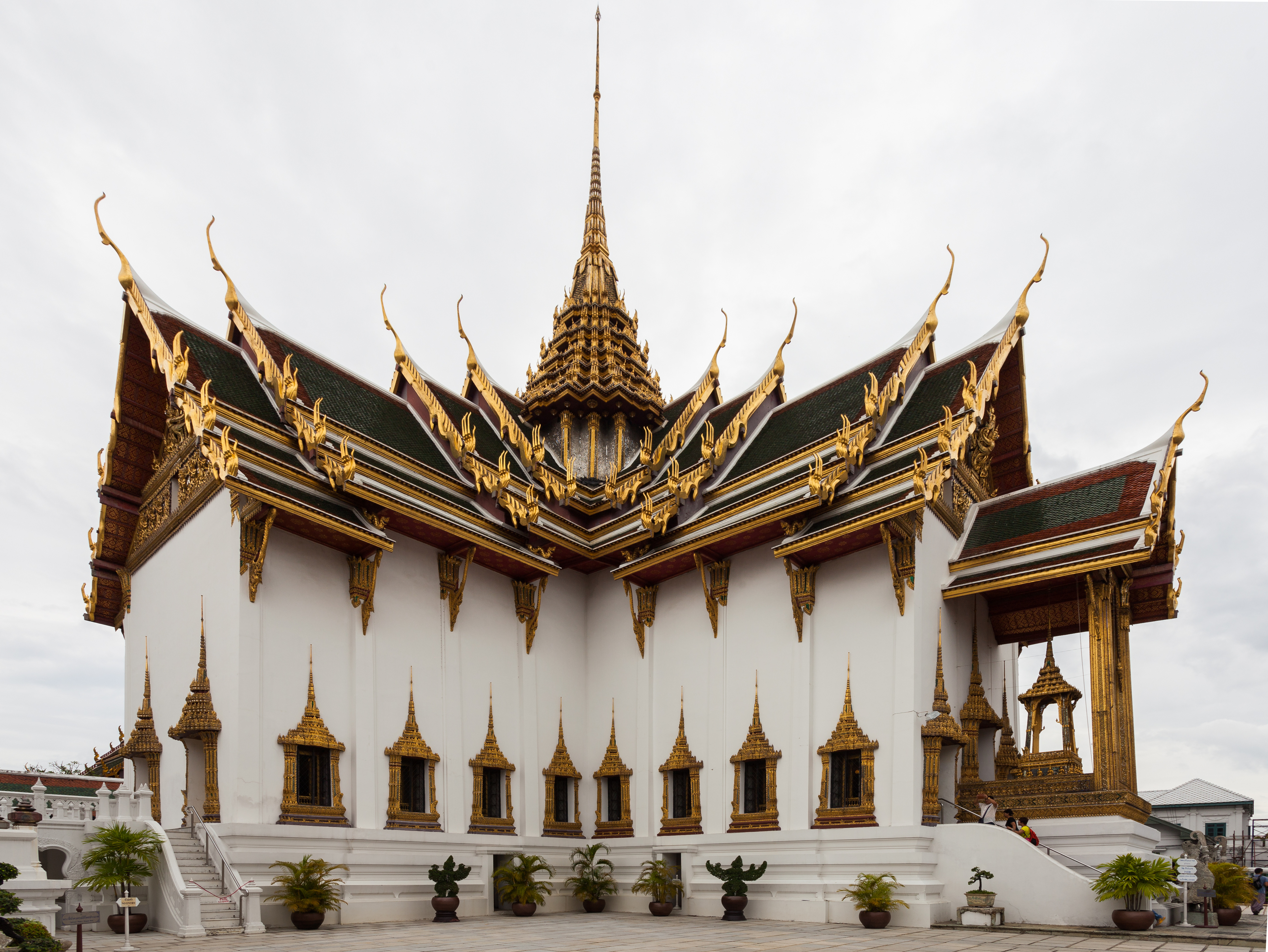
Dusit Maha Prasat Throne Hall (1789) – an example of Prasat characterized by cruciform plan with spire in the center

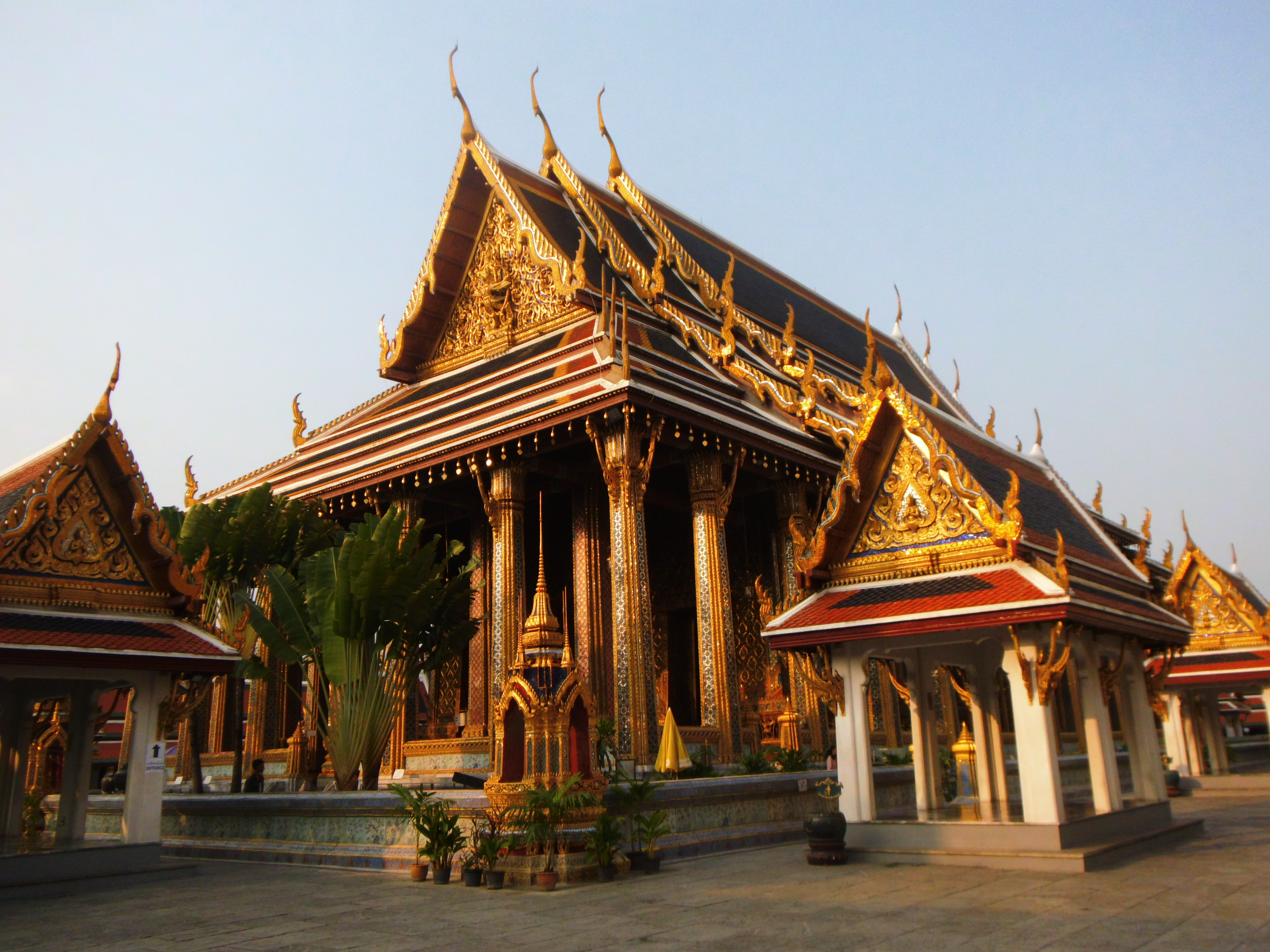
Ubosoth or ordination hall of Wat Phra Kaew is an example of Ayutthaya/Early Bangkok architecture.

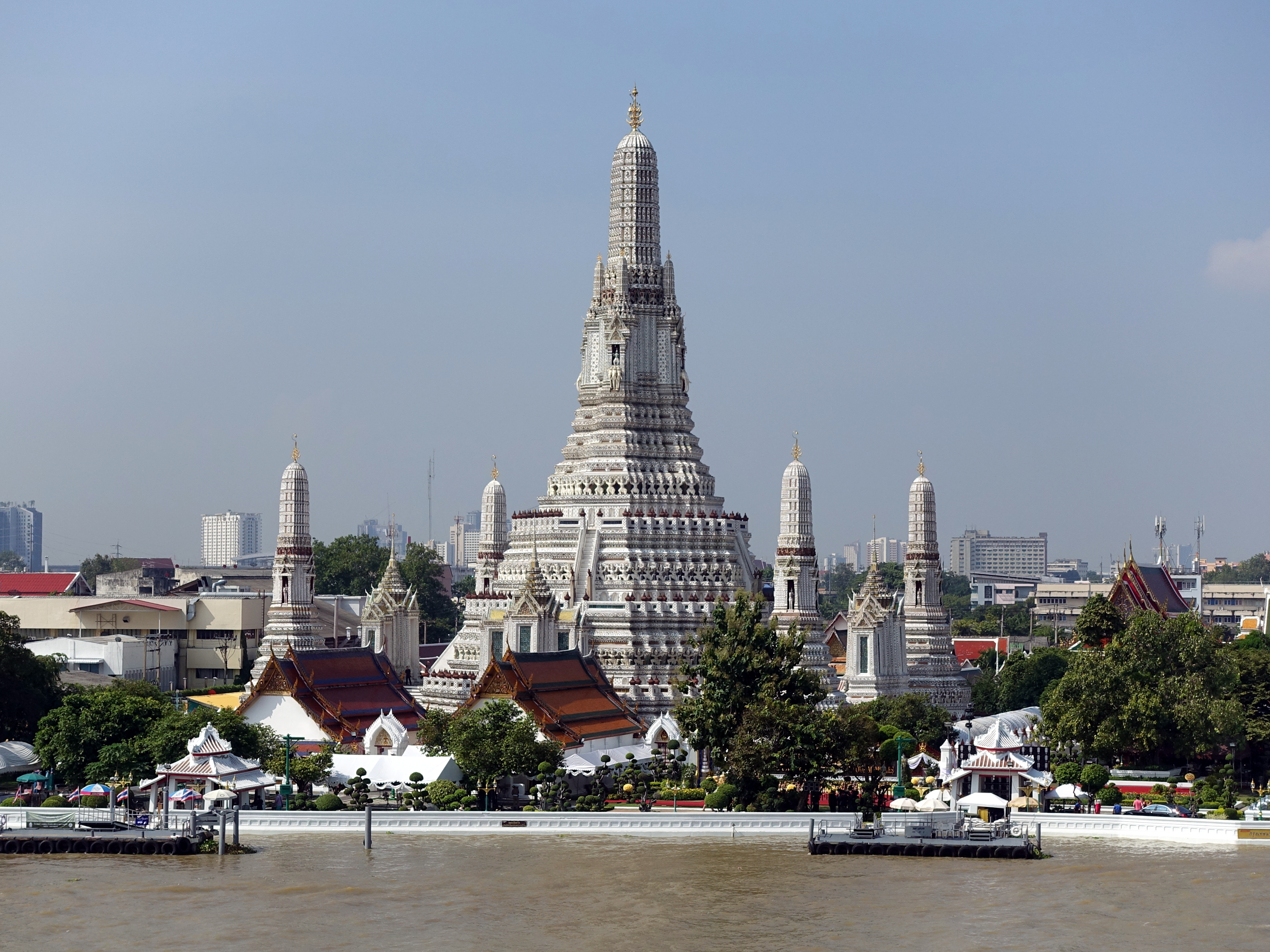
Landmark Neo-Angkorian Prang pagoda of Wat Arun (constructed from 1842 to 1851)

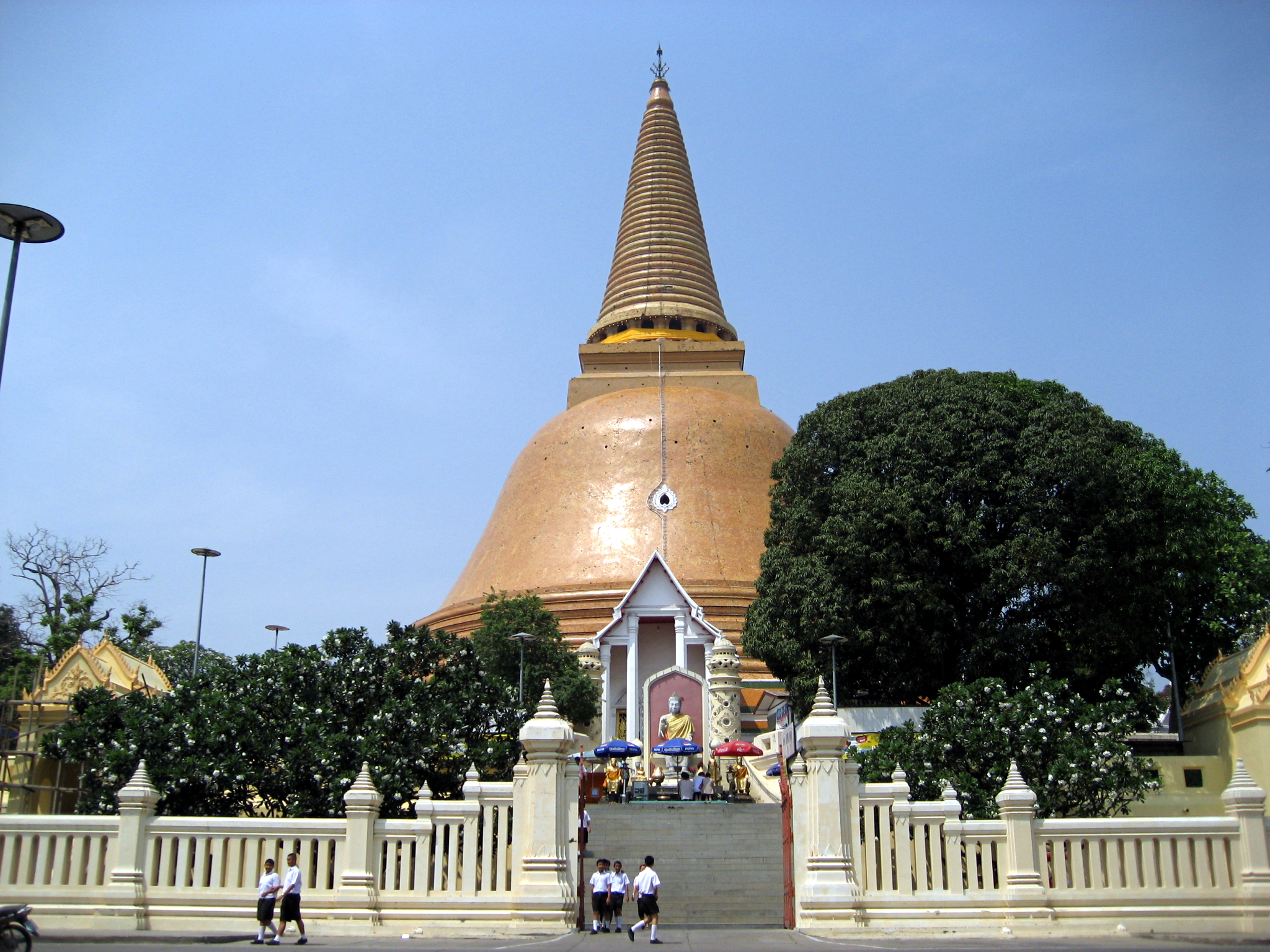
Sukhothai-style rounded Phra Pathommachedi pagoda (1853)

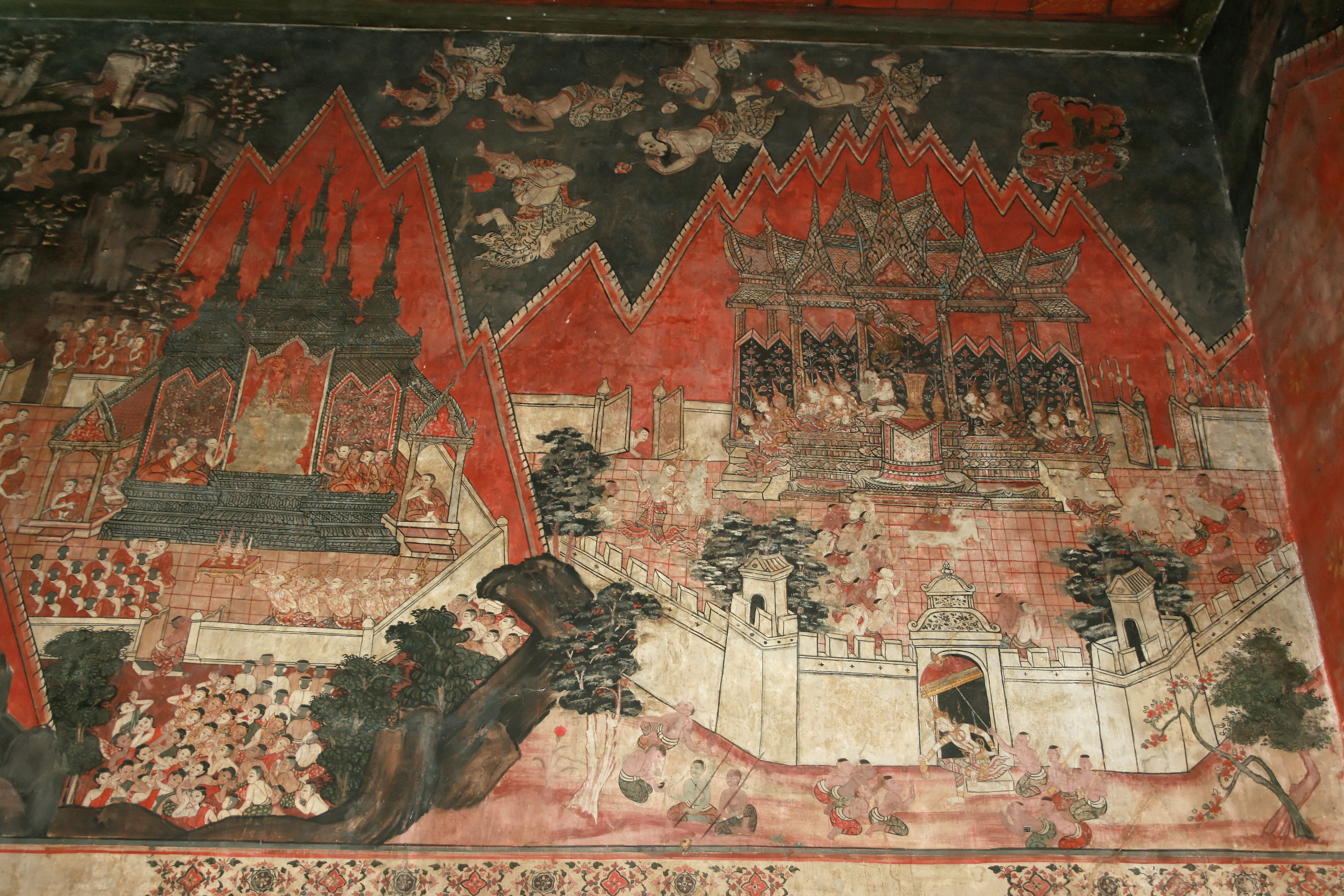
Wall mural of Wat Chaithit temple depicting Buddhist stories

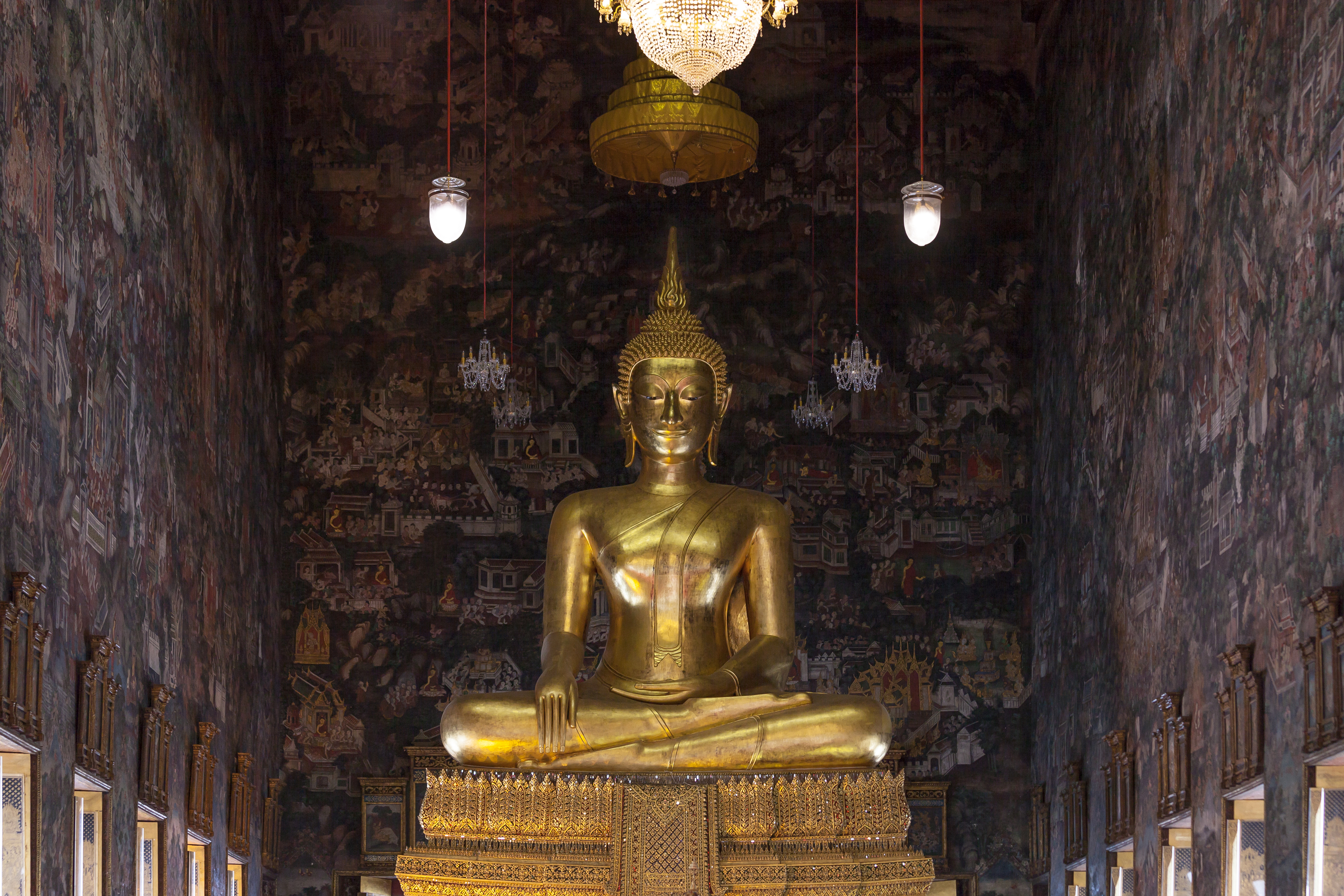
Phra Phuttha Trilokachet of Wat Suthat (c. 1834), a Buddha image in sitting posture

As early Chakri kings sought to emulate old Ayutthaya, art tradition of Early Rattanakosin Period followed the style of Late Ayutthaya. Siamese arts and architecture reached new peak in Early Bangkok in early nineteenth century. Prevailing mood was that of reconstruction with little explicit innovations. Like in Ayutthaya, the Bangkok court hosted Chang Sip Mu (ช่างสิบหมู่) or Ten Guilds of Royal Craftsmen to produce arts, crafts and architecture. Traditional Siamese arts mainly served royal palaces and temples. King Rama I the founder of Rattanakosin kingdom began construction of the Grand Palace including Wat Phra Kaew, which was the 'royal chapel' used by the king for ceremonies without any monks residing, in 1783. Royal palace pavilions took inspiration from Ayutthayan palace buildings. When finished, Wat Phra Kaew housed the Emerald Buddha, moved from Wat Arun in 1784. Ubosoth or main ordination hall of Wat Phra Kaew is the best-preserved structure that can be an example of how Ayutthayan style was implemented in Early Bangkok Period. Three-tiered roof, decorated gable motifs with curved base and inlaid mother-of-pearl doors of the Ubosoth were characteristic of Ayutthayan architecture.

In Early Bangkok Period, local existing temples in Bangkok were renovated into fine temples. Central structures of Thai temples included ordination hall Ubosoth (อุโบสถ), which was wide rectangular in shape, for monks to chant and perform ceremonies and Wiharn (วิหาร), which was for general public religious services. Bas reliefs of gable pediments represented Hindu figures and patterns made from gilded carved wood or glass mosaics. Innovation was that temple buildings in Bangkok Period were enclosed by cloister galleries called Rabiang Khot (ระเบียงคต), which was not present in Ayutthaya. Sacred ceremonial grounds for monks were marked by Bai Sema (ใบเสมา) stones. Prasat (ปราสาท) was new structure of Early Bangkok characterized by cruciform plan with Angkorian-style Prang towering in the center. While temples were built with sturdy bricks, vernacular and lay residential structures were wooden and did not endure for long period of time.

Redented-corner and Neo-Angkorian Prang were the most popular styles of Chedis or pagodas in Early Bangkok Period. The grand Prang pagoda of Wat Arun was constructed in 1842 and finished in 1851. It remained the tallest structure in Siam for a significant period of time. When King Mongkut, who was then a Buddhist monk, made pilgrimages to Northern Siam he took inspiration from Sukhothai-Singhalese rounded pagoda style, culminating in construction of round-shaped Wat Phra Pathomchedi pagoda in 1853.

Traditional Thai painting was dedicated to Buddhist mural arts of temples depicting Buddhist themes including the life of Buddha, Jataka tales and cosmology. Colors were restricted mostly to earth-tones.

Buddha images were not as extensively cast as they used to be in Ayutthaya Period. Numerous Buddha images from ruinous cities of Ayutthaya, Sukhothai and Phitsanulok were moved to be placed in various temples in Bangkok during Early Bangkok Period.

==== Chinese influences ====
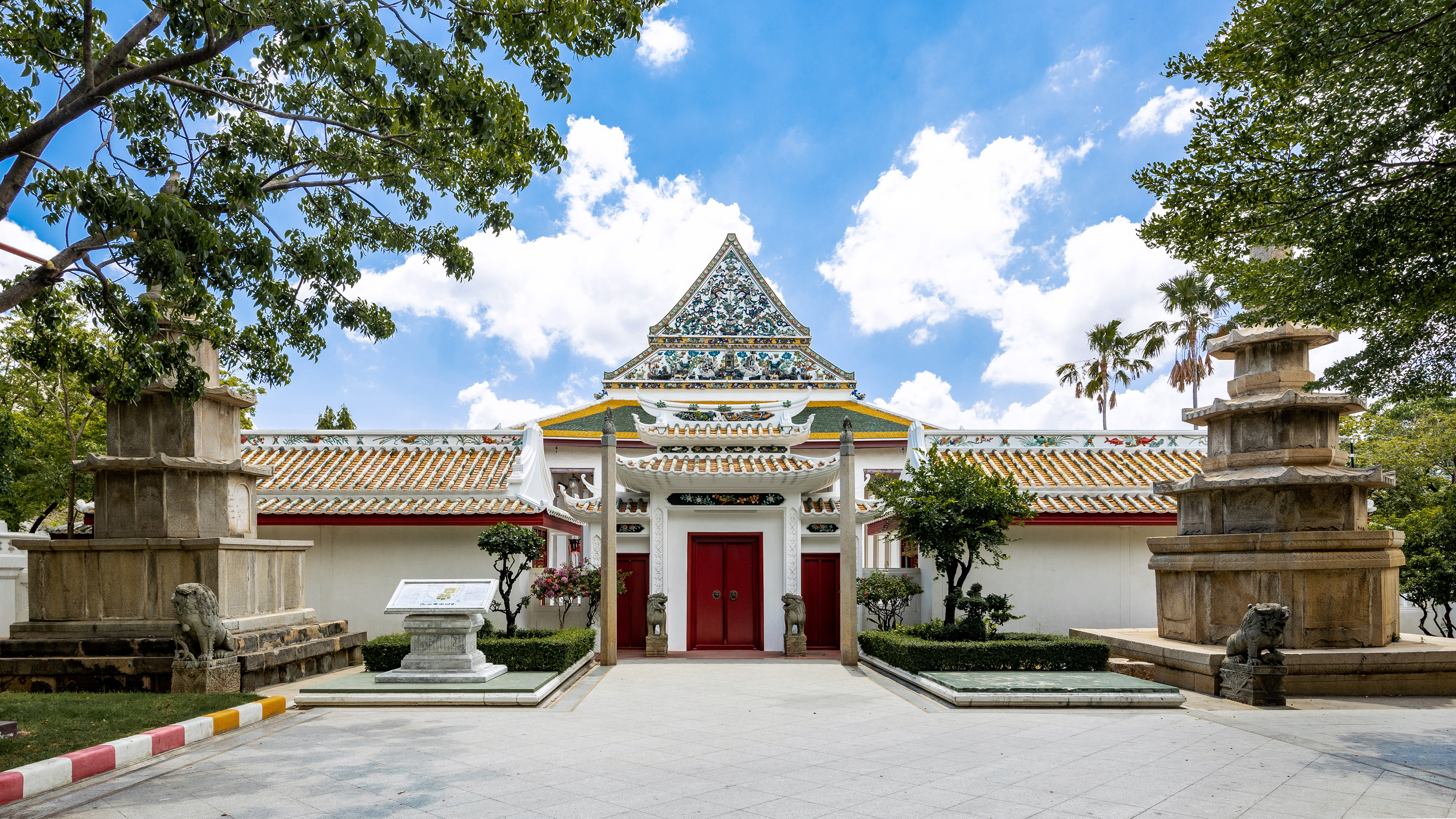
Wat Ratcha-orot (constructed 1820–31) was the prototype of Chinese-style Thai temple.

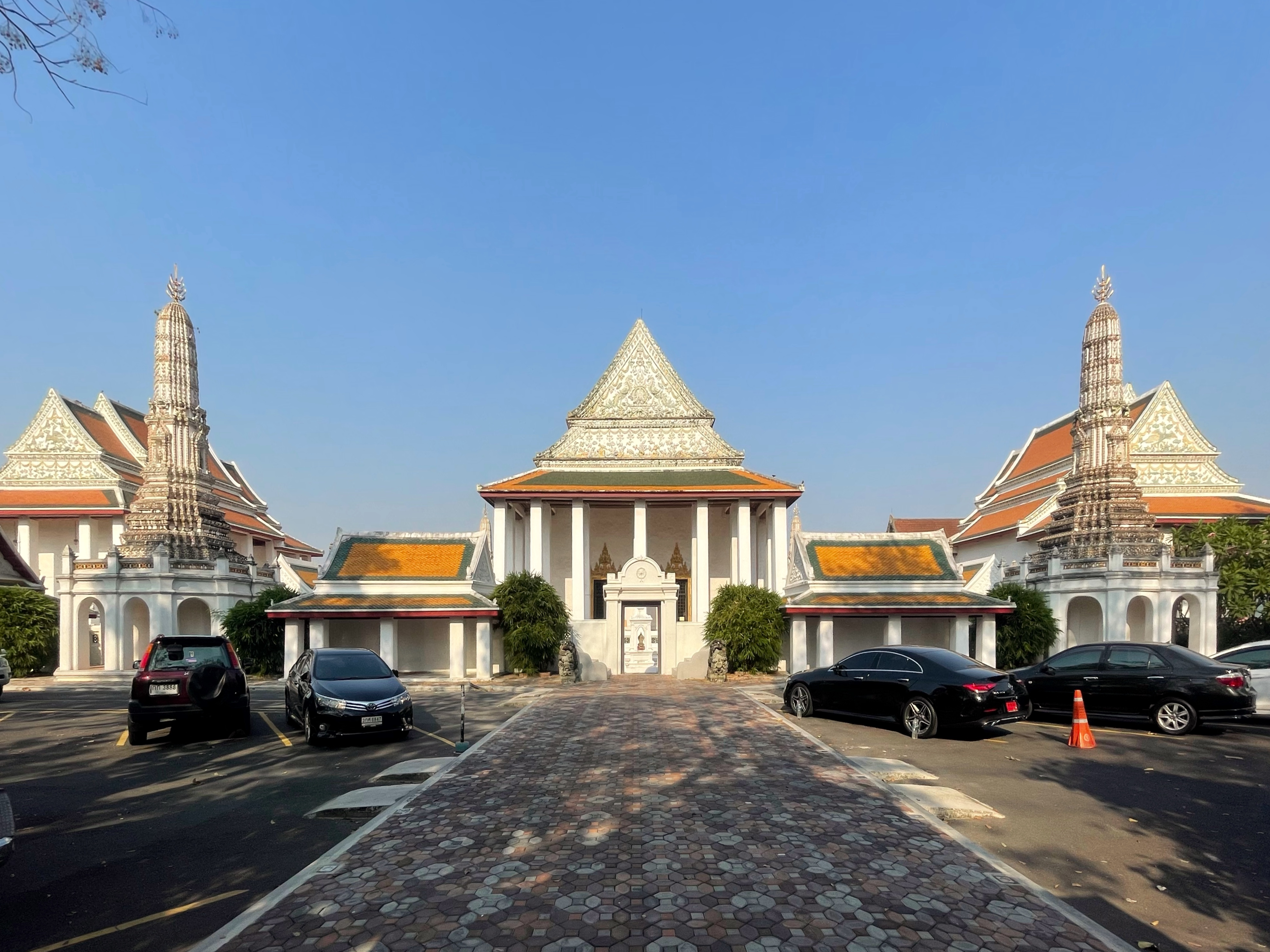
Wat Thepthidaram (constructed 1836–39), another example of Sino-Siamese style temple

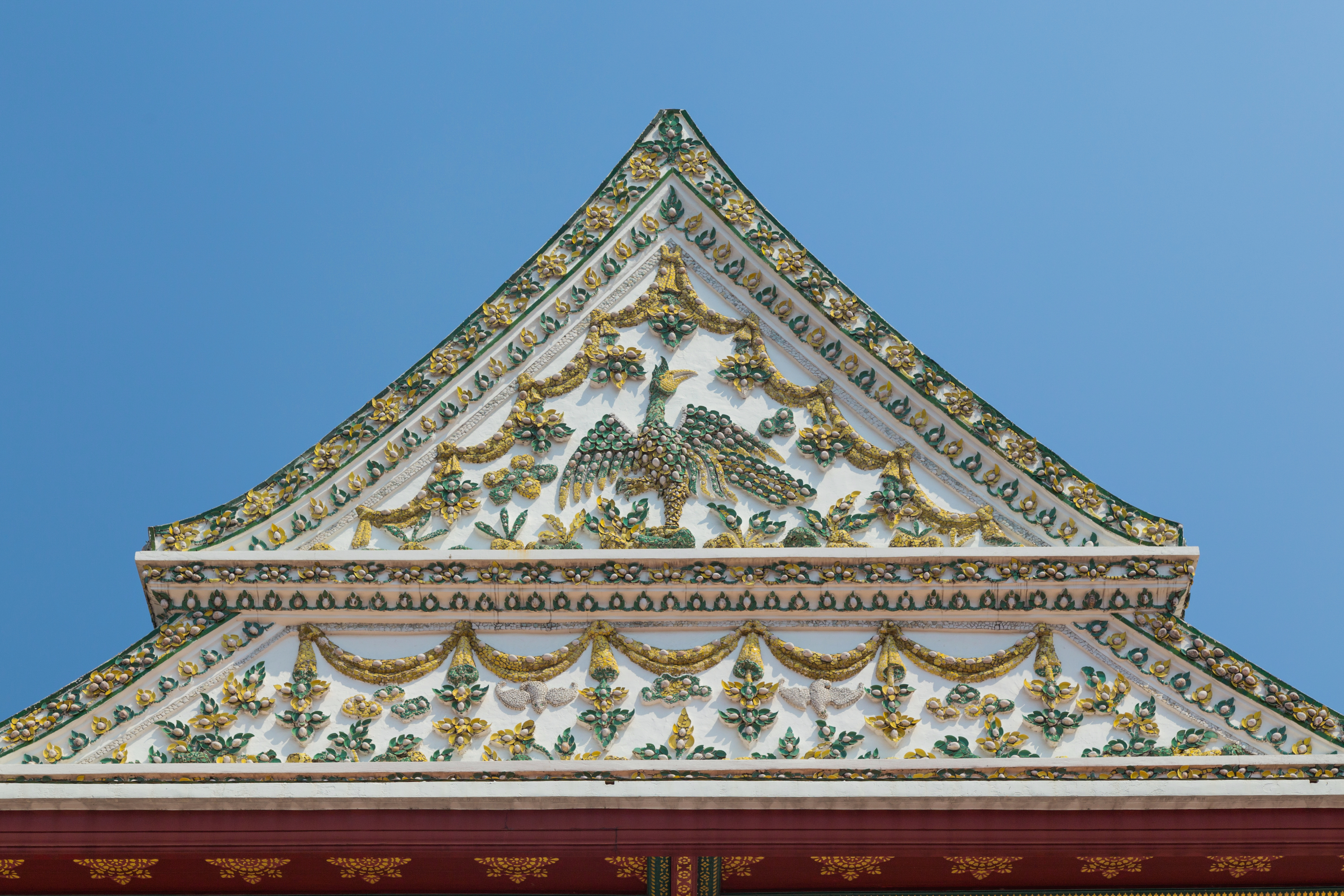
Pediment façade of Wat Thepthidaram, made from stucco decorated with Chinese floral patterns

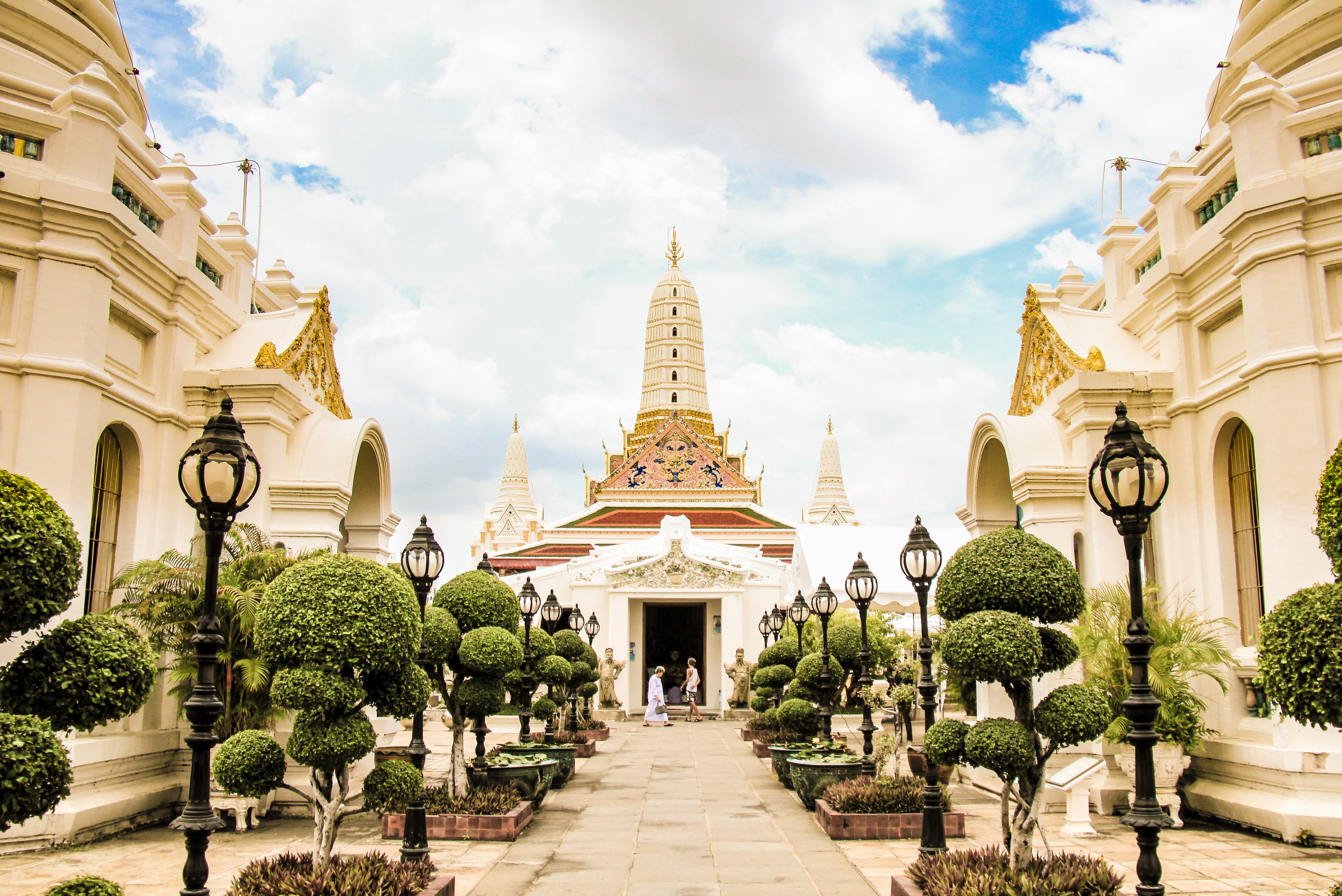
Wat Phichaiyat (c. 1830) represented Sino-Siamese fusion style. Prangs were made from stucco. Chinese-style pediment was apparent.

King Rama III, known before ascension as Prince Chetsadabodin, had overseen Kromma Tha or Ministry of Trade and had acquainted with Chinese traders in Bangkok. In 1820, Prince Chetsadabodin led army to the west to fight the Burmese. He rested his troops at Chom Thong where he renovated the existing Chom Thong Temple in Chinese style using stucco decorated with Chinese motifs rather than traditional Siamese decorations. The renovation completed in 1831 and the temple became known as Wat Ratcha-orot Temple, which was the prototype of Sino-Siamese fusion architecture – called Phra Ratchaniyom (พระราชนิยม) "Royal Preference" style. Sinicization was strong during the reign of King Rama III (r. 1824–1851), during which up to seventy Theravadin temples were either constructed or renovated and one quarter of those temples involved were in Chinese style. Chinese elements introduced were blue-and-white inlaid with stucco, ornate ceramic mosaic, ceramic roofs and ridged tiles. Pediments were plastered and decorated with Chinese floral motifs in ceramic mosaics rather than traditional wooden gilded Hindu-deities decorations. Chinese decorative objects including Chinese pagodas, door guardian statues, door frames and glass paintings were imported from China to be installed in chinoiserie temples. Well-known Chinese-style temples included Wat Ratcha-orot, Wat Thepthidaram and Wat Phichaiyat. Neo-Angkorian Prang of Wat Arun, constructed during the reign of Rama III, was adorned with Chinese stucco motifs, representing fusion of array of styles. Chinese style persisted into the reign of King Mongkut in the 1860s.

==== Western influences ====
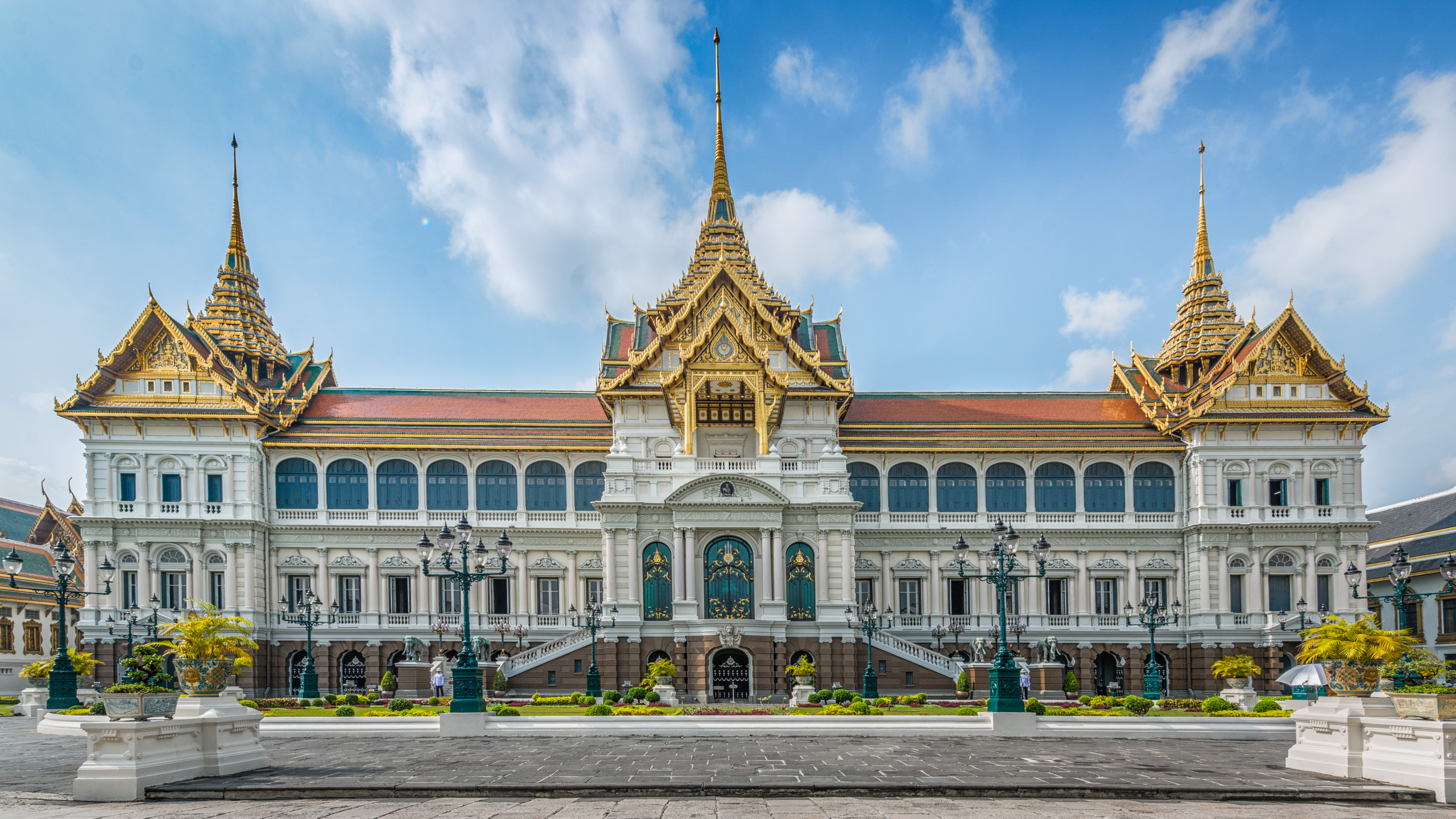
Chakri Maha Prasat Throne Hall (1876), designed by British architect John Clunis, represents Siamese-Western fusion style.

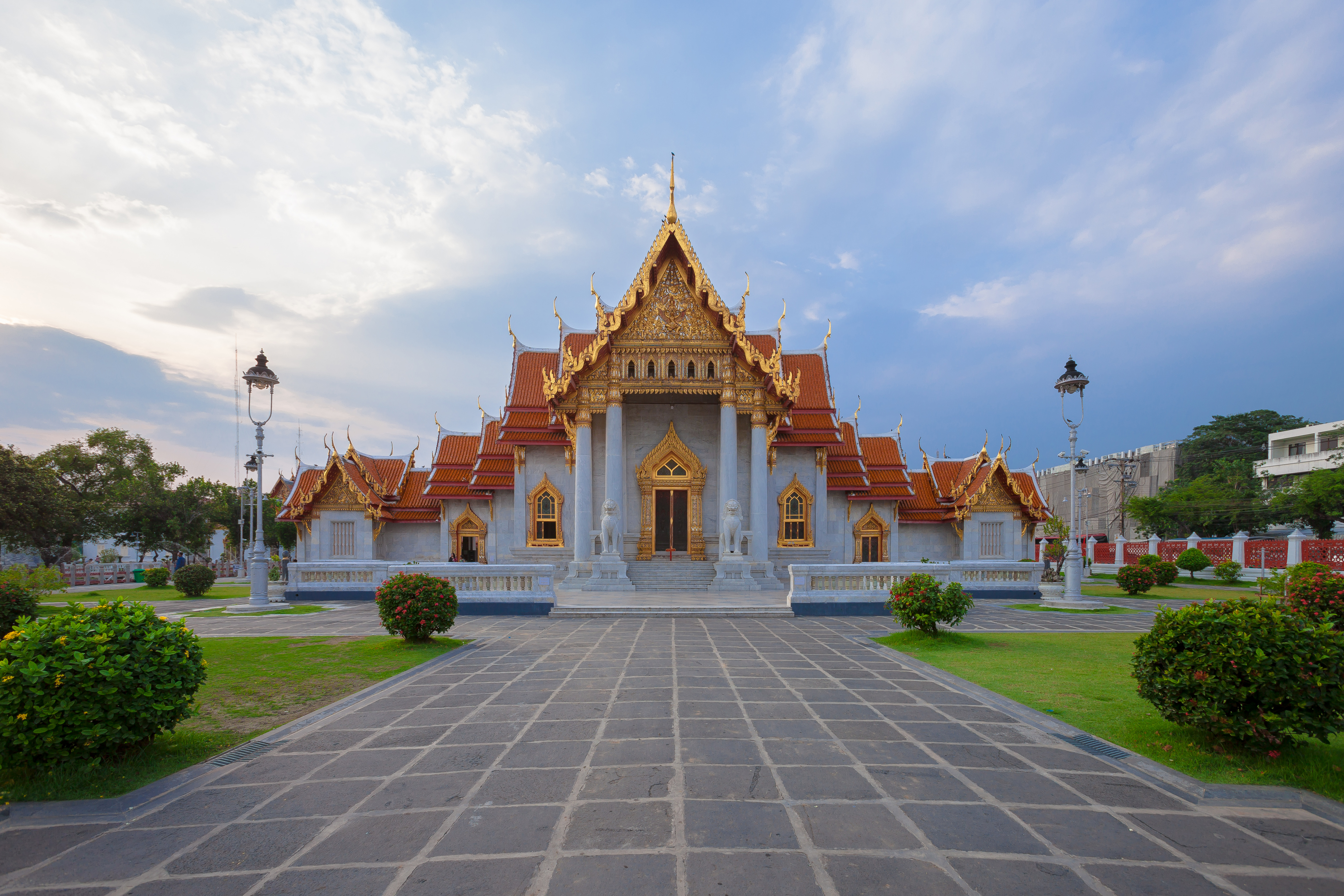
Ubosoth of Wat Benchamabophit (1898) was made from Italian marble.

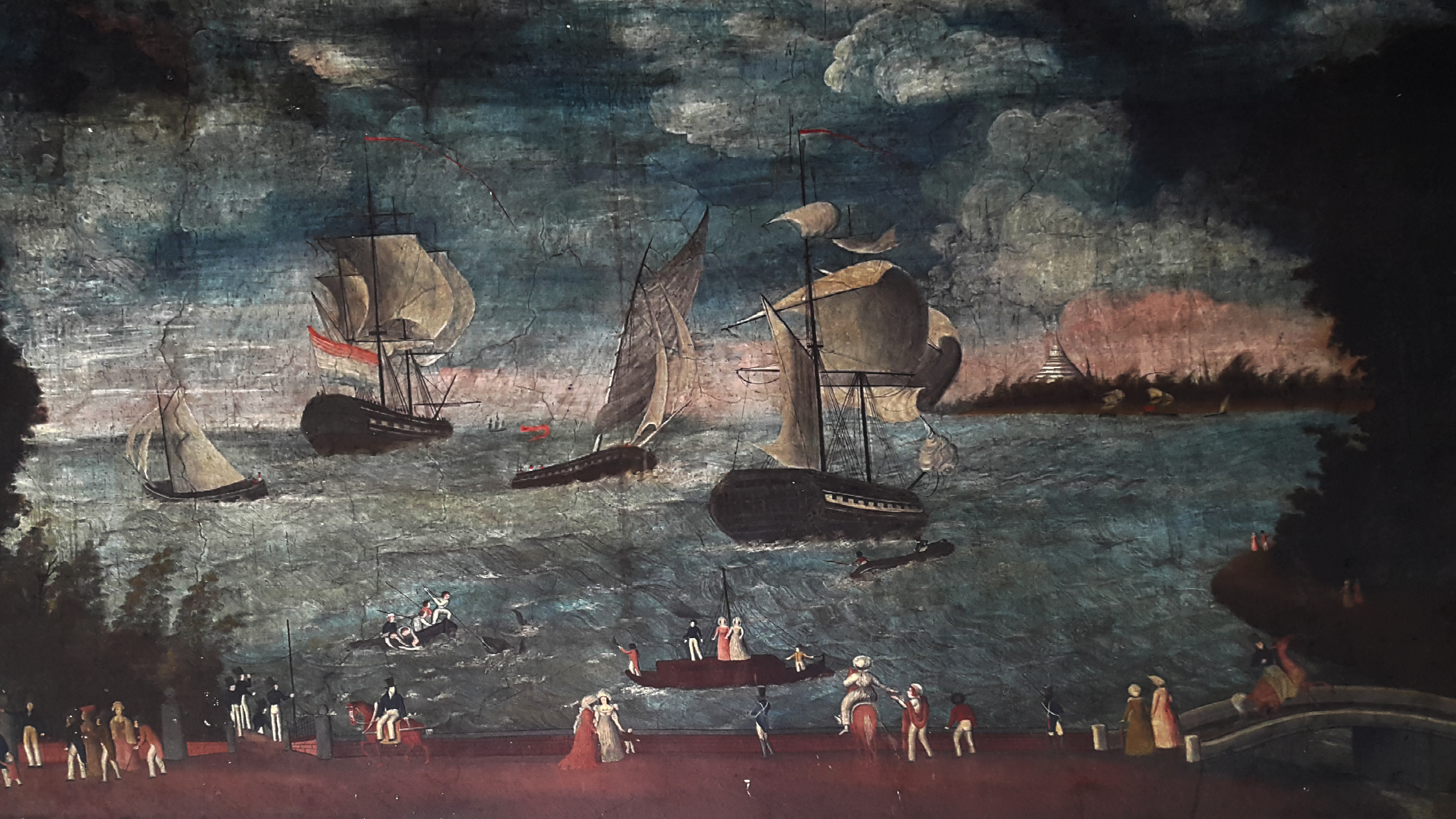
Impressionist mural painting of Khrua In Khong at Wat Boromniwat

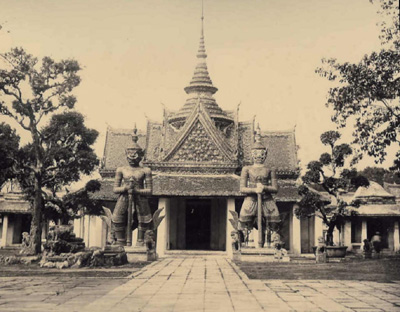
Photo of entrance door of Wat Arun taken by Francis Chit (1869)

Siam opened the kingdom as the result of the Bowring Treaty of 1855, leading to influx of Western influences onto Siamese art. Khrua In Khong, a native Siamese monk-painter, was known for his earliest adoption of Western realism and for his impressionist works. Previously, traditional Siamese painting was limited to two-dimensional presentation. Khrua In Khong, active in the 1850s, introduced Western-influenced three-dimensional style to depict Buddhist scenes and Dharma riddles. In his temple-mural paintings, Khrua In Khong depicted Western townscapes, applying laws of perspective and using color and light-and-shade techniques.

French bishop Pallegoix introduced daguerreotypes to Siam in 1845. Pallegoix had another French priest Louis Larnaudie bring camera apparatus from Paris to Bangkok. However, Siamese superstitious belief was against photography in aspect that photos would entrap person's soul. Later King Mongkut embraced photography. Larnaudie taught wet-plate photography to a Siamese nobleman Mot Amatyakul, who was the first native Siamese photographer, and a Siamese Catholic Francis Chit. Francis Chit opened his own studio in Kudi Chin in 1863, producing photos of temples, palaces, dignitaries, landscapes and cityscapes. Chit was appointed as official royal photographer in 1866 with title Khun Sunthornsathisalak and was later promoted in 1880 to Luang Akkhani Naruemit. Francis Chit accompanied King Chulalongkorn as royal photographer on royal trips abroad. Chit sent his son to learn photography at Germany and after his death in 1891 his studio Francis Chit & Sons continued to operate.

=== Language and Literature ===
==== Linguistic changes ====
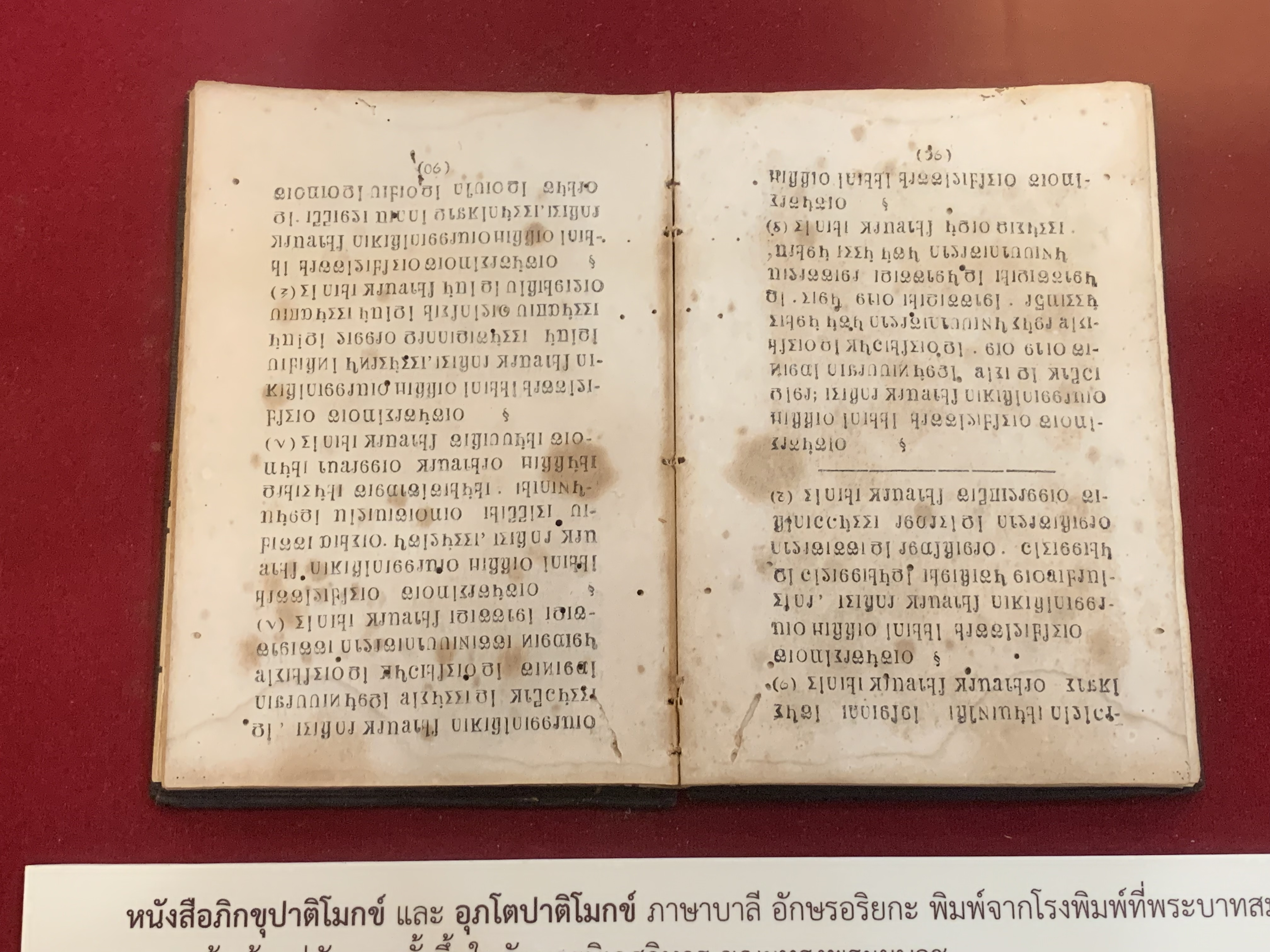
Bhikkhu Patimokkha in Latin-derived Ariyaka script invented by King Mongkut c. 1841 to write Buddhist texts

Siamese (now known as Thai) was the language of Rattanakosin government. The royal court maintained a specialized register called Rachasap (ราชาศัพท์) to be used onto royalty characterized by Khmer lexicon usage. Another set of special vocabulary was used onto the monks. Thai script was used to write worldly matters including historical chronicles, government decrees and personal poems, while a variant of Khmer script called Khom Thai script was used to write Buddhist Pāli texts including the Tripitaka. Native Siamese people spoke Siamese language. Other languages were spoken by ethnic immigrants or people of tributary states including Northern Thai language of Lanna, Lao language of Laos and Khorat Plateau, Malay language of southern sultanates and other minority languages. Languages of Chinese immigrants were Teochew and Hokkien. Ethnic immigration also affected Siamese language. Plethora of Southern Min Chinese lexicon entered Thai language. Chinese loanwords prompted invention of two new tone markers; Mai-Tri and Mai-Chattawa that were used exclusively for Chinese words to transmit Chinese tones. Mai-Tri and Mai-Chattawa first appeared around mid-to-late eighteenth century.

During religious reforms in mid-nineteenth century, King Mongkut discouraged the use of Khom Thai script in religious works for reason that its exclusivity gave wrong impression that Khmer script was holy and magical, ordering the monks to switch to Thai script in recording Buddhist canon. Mongkut also invented Roman-inspired 'Ariyaka script' c. 1841 to promote printing of Tripitaka instead of traditionally inscribing on palm leaves but it did not come into popular use and eventually fell out of usage. Only in 1893 that first whole set of the Pāli canon in Thai script was printed.

==== Traditional literature ====
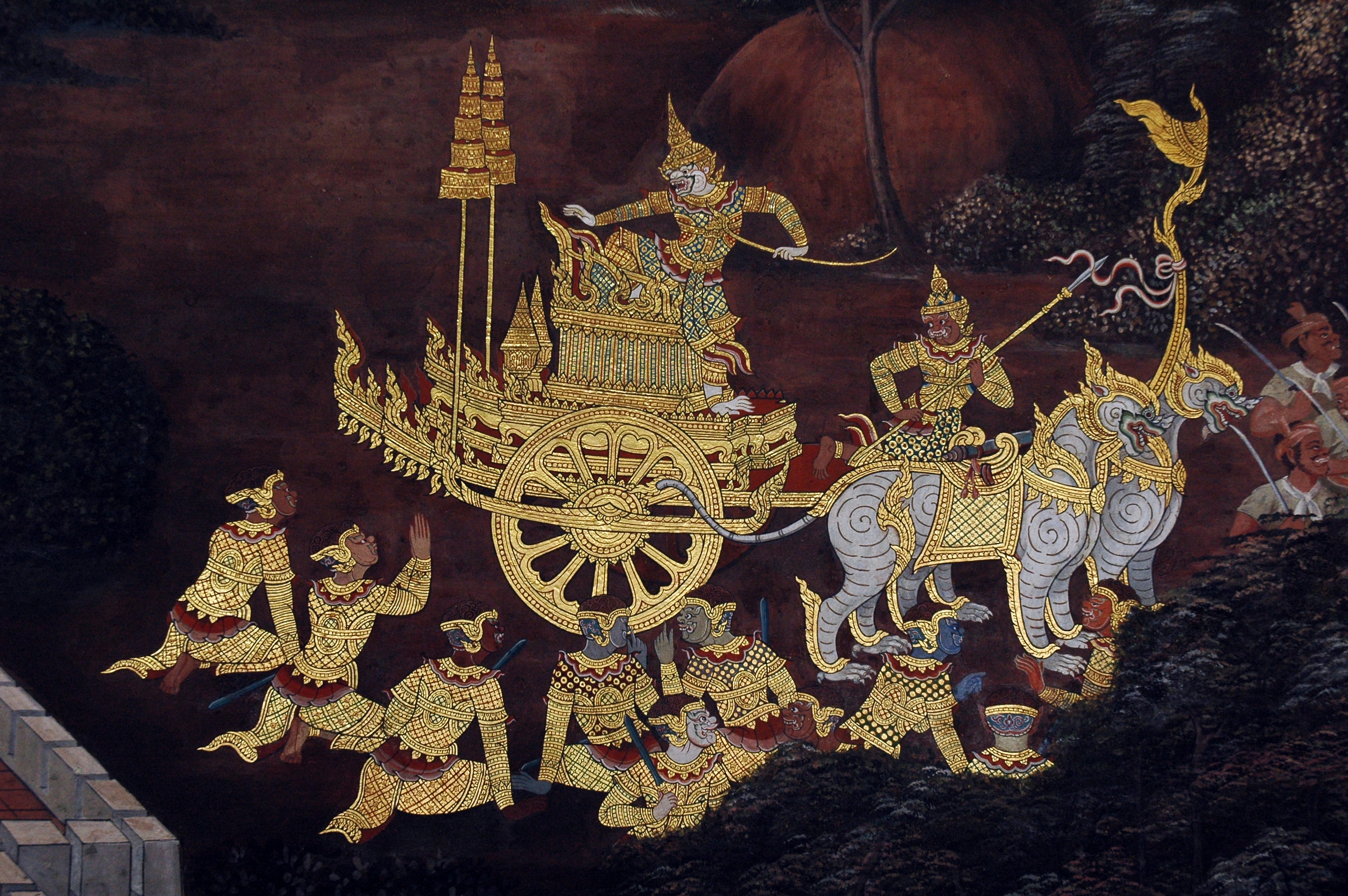
Hanuman on his chariot, a mural scene from the Ramakien in Wat Phra Kaew

Siamese royal court of Early Bangkok Period sought to restore royal epics and plays lost during the wars. Kings Rama I and Rama II themselves wrote and recomposed royal plays including Ramakien (adapted from Indian epic Ramayana) and Inao (Thai version of Javanese Panji tales). Kings' own works were called Phra Ratchaniphon (พระราชนิพนธ์ "Royal writing"). Refined royal theater plays, known as Lakhon Nai (ละครใน "Inner plays"), was reserved only for royal court and was performed by all-female actors that were part of royal regalia, in contrast to vernacular, boisterous Lakhon Nok (ละครนอก "Outer plays") that entertained commoner folk and performed by all-male troupes. Krom Alak or Department of Royal Scribes formed circles of illustrious court poets and scholars under royal supervision. Traditional Siamese non-fiction genre includes Buddhist and historical themes. Chaophraya Phrakhlang Hon was known for his translation of Chinese Romance of Three Kingdoms and Burmese Razadarit Ayedawbon into prose works Samkok and Rachathirat, respectively. Despite foreign origins of these works, they were appropriated into Thai literature repertoire to be distinctively Thai and incorporated many local Siamese legends. Prince Poramanuchit, who was the Sangharaja hierophant from 1851 to 1853, produced vast array of educational literature including a new version of Thai Vessantara Jātaka, Samutthakhot Khamchan that narrated moral lessons, Krishna teaches his Sister that narrated morals for women and Lilit Taleng Phai (1832) that described Burmese-Siamese Wars of King Naresuan. Traditional Thai literature were produced in first three reigns more than any other periods.

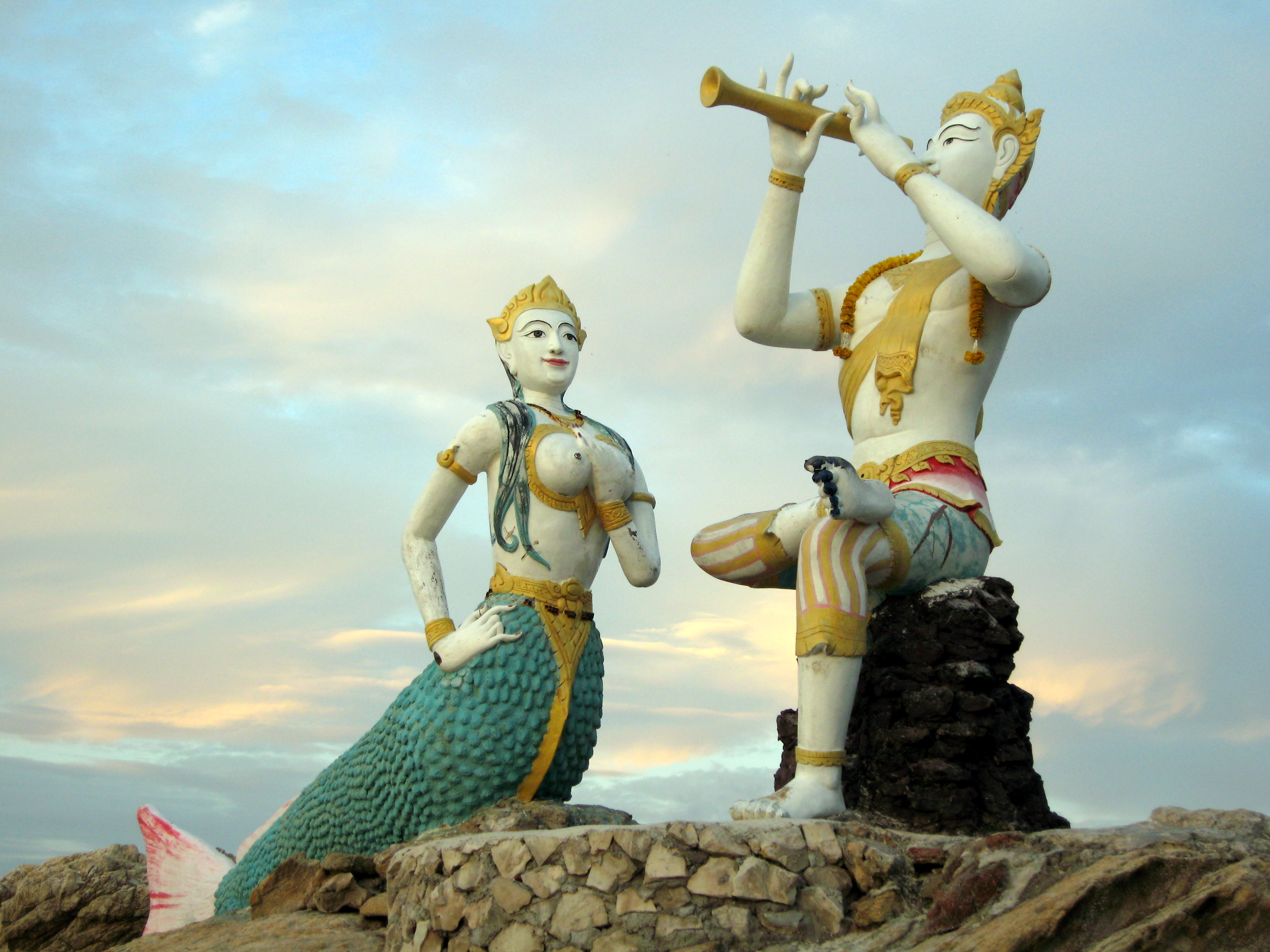
Phra Aphai Mani statue on Ko Samet

King Rama II (r. 1809–1824) was a great patron of Siamese poetry and his reign was considered to be "Golden Age of Thai literature". His court hosted a large number of authors and it was said that any nobles who could compose fine literary works would gain royal favor. King Rama II the 'poet king' was known to personally wrote many works and even composed a new version of Sang Thong, a folktale. The king was an accomplished musician, playing and composing for the fiddle and introducing new instrumental techniques. He was also a sculptor and is said to have sculpted the face of the Niramitr Buddha in Wat Arun. Among royal poets was the most prominent one – Sunthorn Phu (1786–1855), who enjoyed royal favor as one of the most accomplished court poets. Sunthorn Phu's fortunes took a downturn, however, in 1824 when the new king Rama III, whom Sunthorn Phu had previously offended, ascended the throne. Phu ended up leaving royal court to become a wanderer and drunkard. It was during his unfortunate times of life that Sunthorn Phu produced his most famous works. His most important masterpiece was Phra Aphai Mani – a poetic work with more than 30,000 lines telling stories of a rogue womanizer prince who left his kingdom to pursue gallant adventures in the seas. Sunthorn Phu produced many Nirats, poems describing journeys and longing for home and loved ones, including Nirat Mueang Klaeng (journey to Klaeng, his father's hometown, 1806–07), Nirat Phra Bat (journey to Phra Phutthabat, 1807), Nirat Phukhaothong (journey to Ayutthaya, 1828), Nirat Suphan (journey to Suphanburi, 1831), Nirat Phra Pathom (journey to Phra Pathomchedi, 1842) and Nirat Mueang Phet (journey to Phetchaburi, c. 1845). Sunthorn Phu's greatness was his literary range, his brilliant creativity and naturalism not restricted to refined formalities. Phu's genuine language, sincerity and realism made his works appealing to the public mass.

=== Education ===
There was no official institutions for education such as universities in pre-modern Siam. Siamese traditional education was closely tied to the Buddhist religion. Boys went to temples or became novice monks to learn Thai and Pāli languages from monks, who offered tutorships for free as a part of religious works. Princes and young nobles received tuition from high-ranking monks in fine temples. Girls were not expected to be literate and were usually taught domestic arts such as culinary and embroidery. However, education for women was not restricted and upper-class women had more opportunities for literacy. There were some prominent female authors in the early Rattanakosin period. Craftsmanships and artisanships were taught internally in the same family or community.

The only higher education available in pre-modern Siam was the Buddhist Pāli doctrinal learning – the Pariyattham (ปริยัติธรรม). Monks took exams to be qualified to rise up in the ecclesiastic bureaucracy. There were three levels of Pariyattham exams inherited from Ayutthaya with each level called Parian (เปรียญ). In the 1810s, the three Parian levels were re-organized into nine Parian levels. Pariyattham exams were organized by the royal court, who encouraged Pāli learning in order to uphold Buddhism, and were usually held in the Emerald Buddha temple. Examinations involved translation and oral recitation of Pāli doctrines in front of examiner monks. Pariyattham exam was the vehicle both for intellectual pursuits and for advancement in monastic hierarchy for a monk.

King Rama III ordered traditional Thai religious and secular arts, including Buddhist doctrines, traditional medicine, literature and geopolitics to be inscribed on stone steles at Wat Pho from 1831 to 1841. The Epigraphic Archives of Wat Pho was recognized by UNESCO as a Memory of the World and were examples of materials with closer resemblance to modern education. The Epigraphical Archives of Wat Pho (external link)

==== Educational reform ====
Rama VI was the first king of Siam to set up a model of the constitution at Dusit Palace. He wanted first to see how things could be managed under this Western system. He saw advantages in the system, and thought that Siam could move slowly towards it, but could not be adopted right away as the majority of the Siamese people did not have enough education to understand such a change just yet. In 1916 higher education came to Siam. Rama VI set up Vajiravudh College, modeled after the British Eton College, as well as the first Thai university, Chulalongkorn University, modeled after Oxbridge.

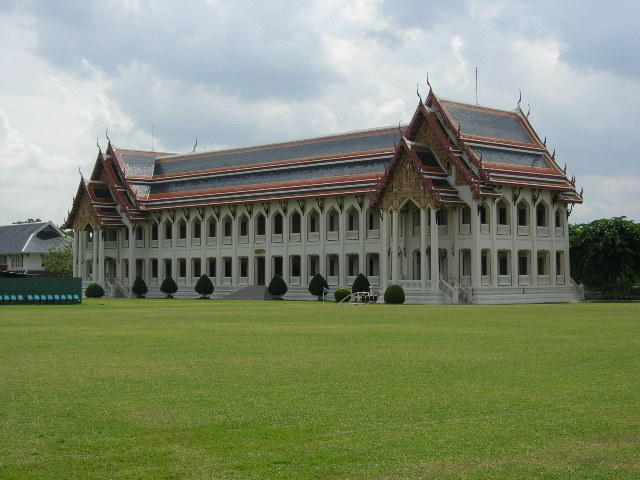
Vajiramonkut Building, Vajiravudh College

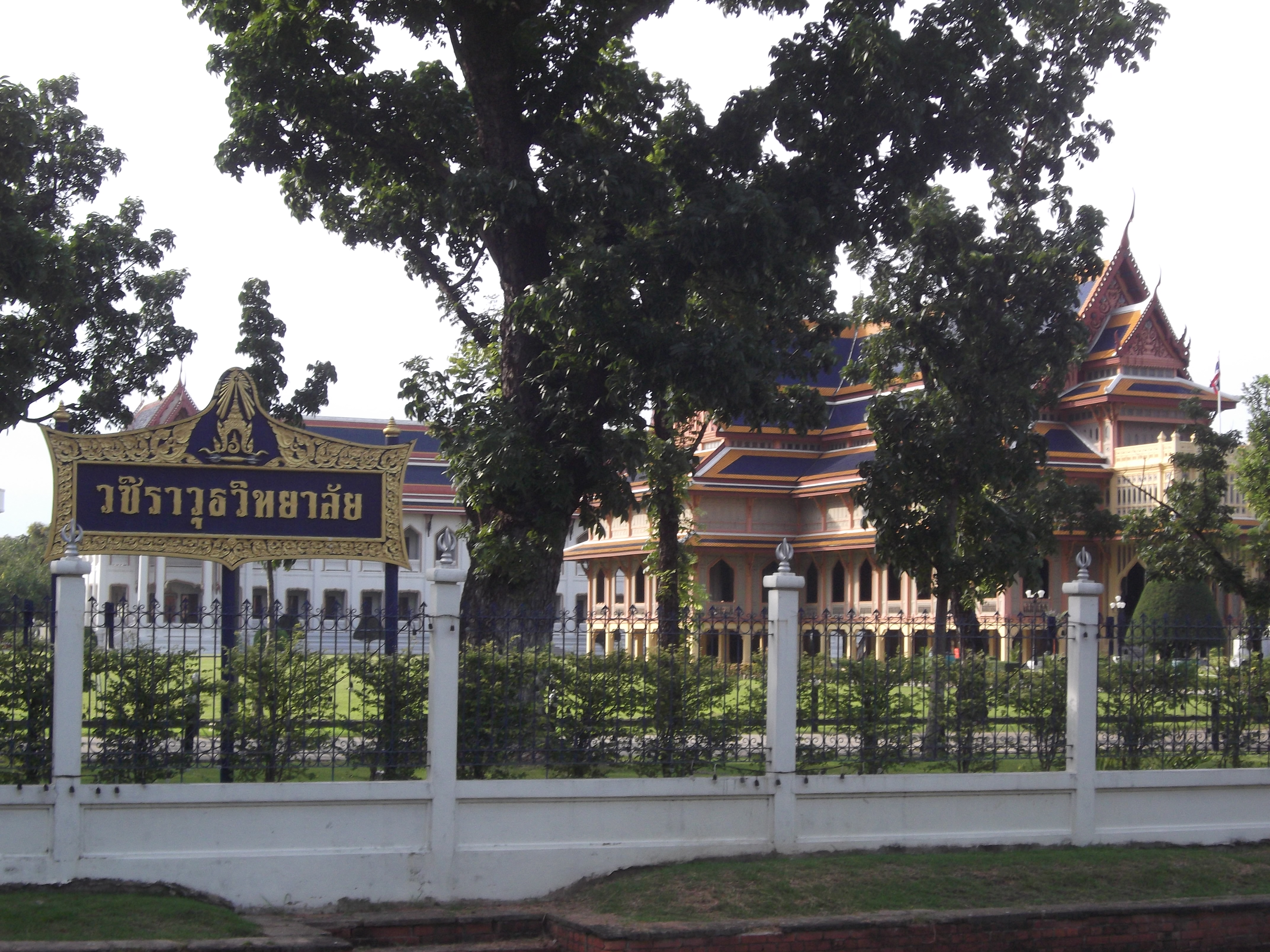
Vajiravudh College

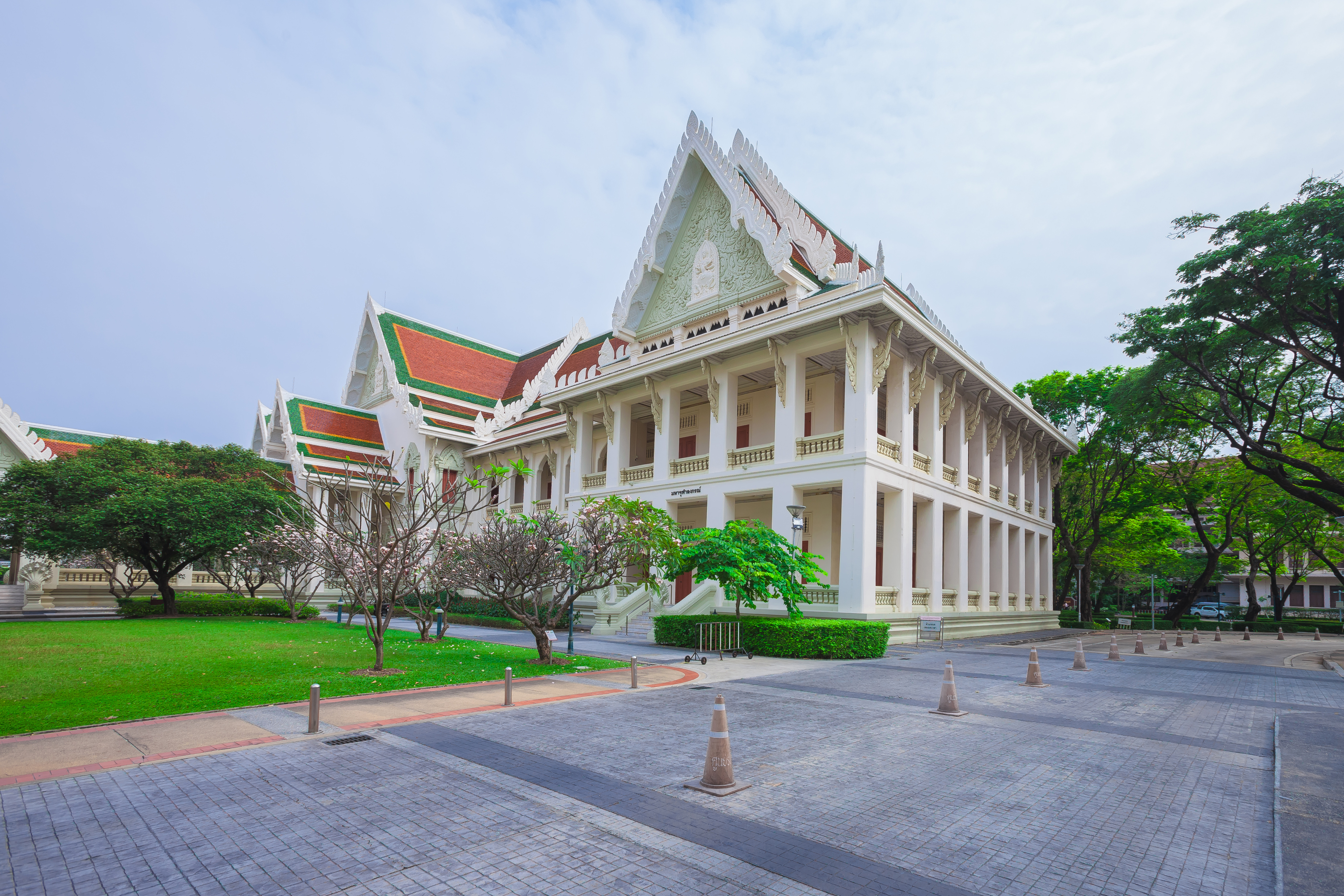
Maha Chulalongkorn Building, Chulalongkorn University

=== Clothing ===
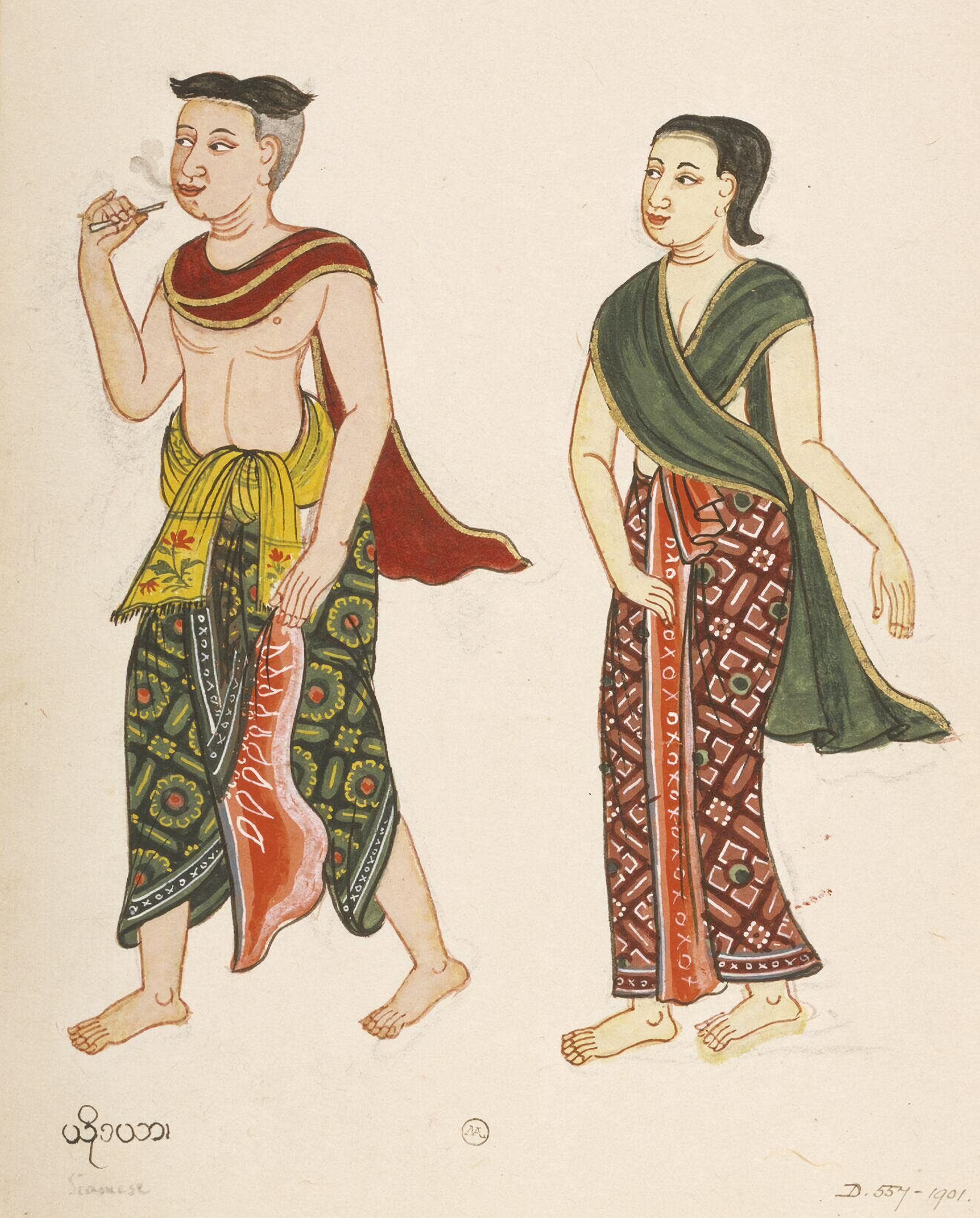
Drawing of a Siamese man and woman in traditional dress. Made around 1887

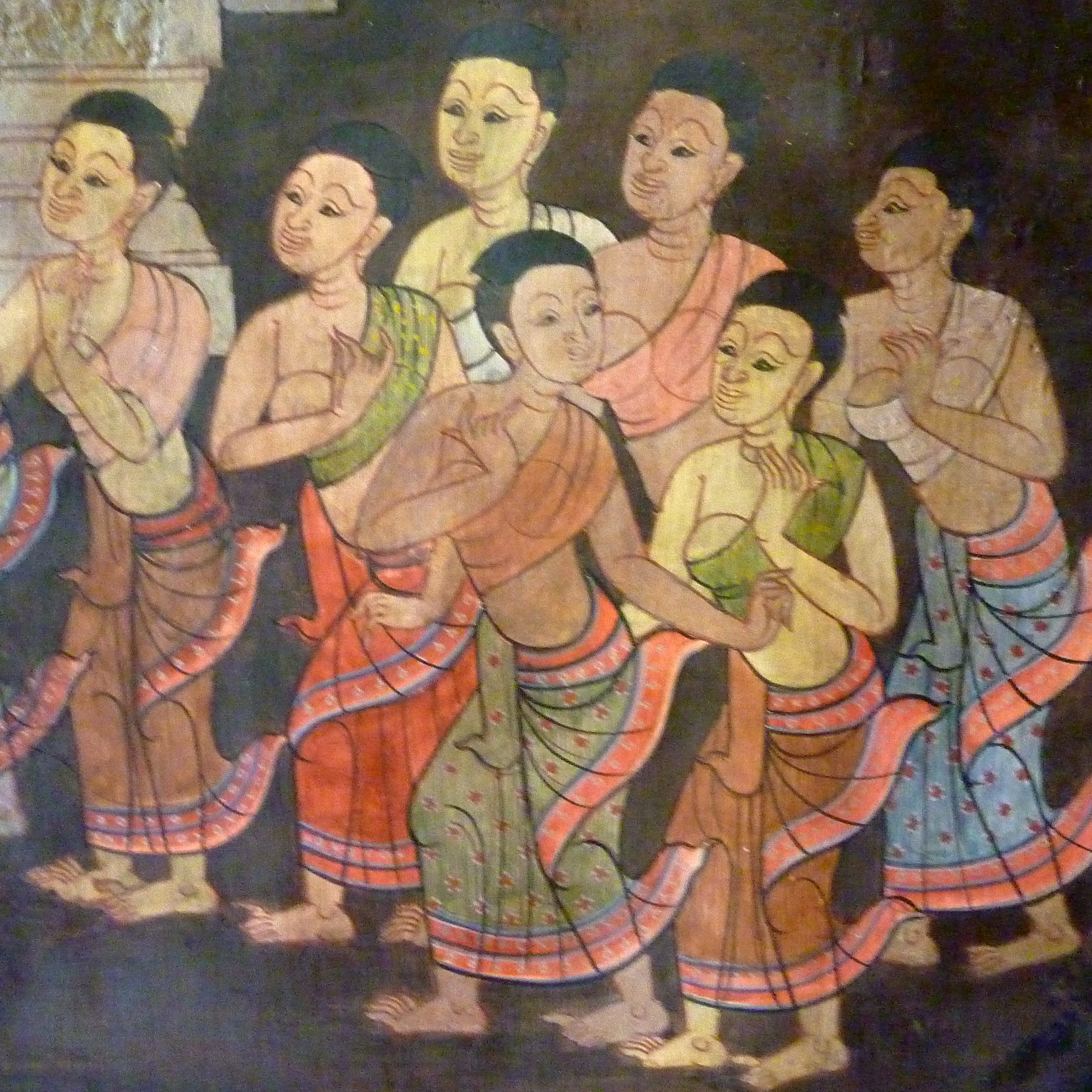
Wall Painting of Siamese women wearing Pha nung and Sabai in Wat Pho, Bangkok

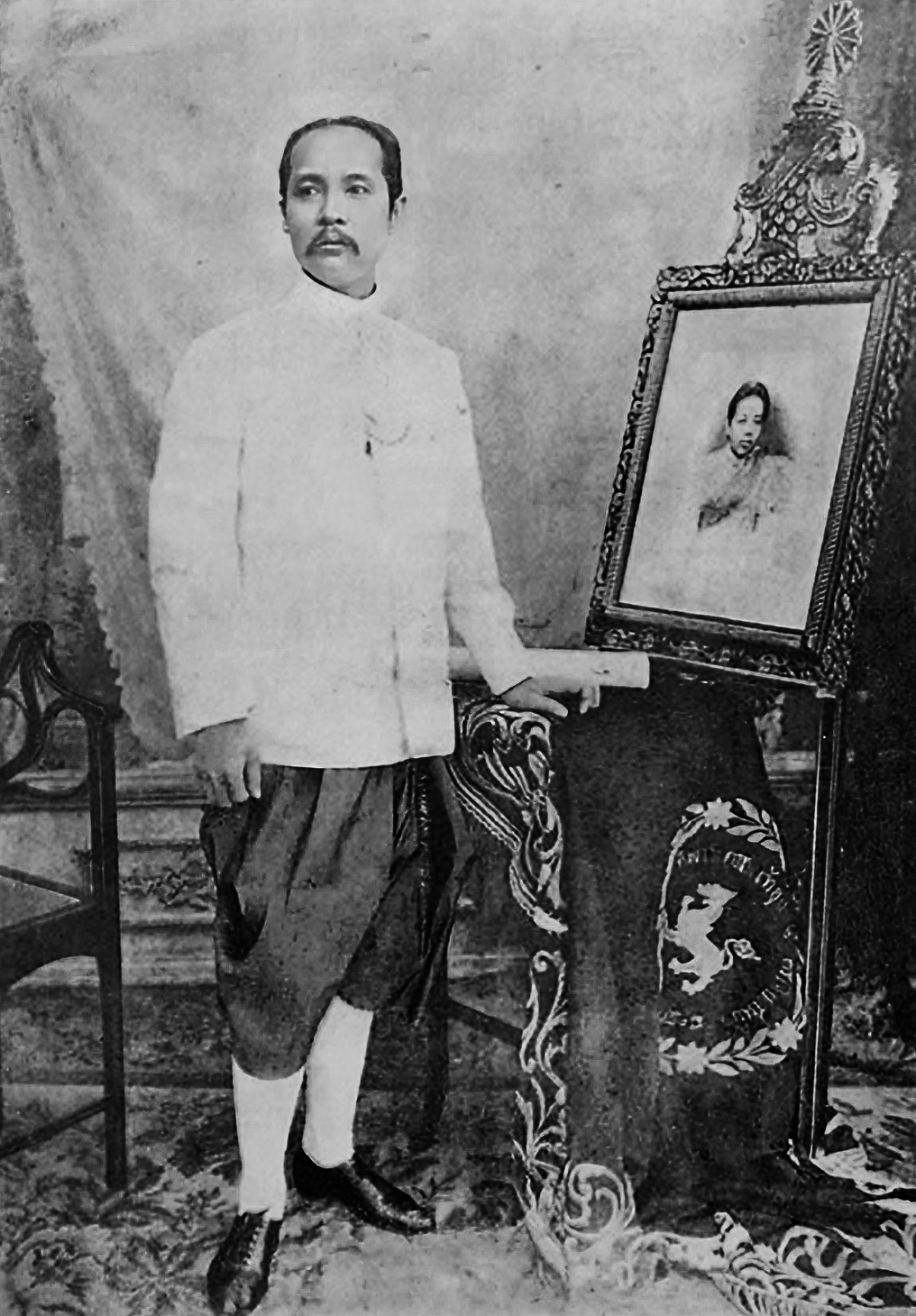
Portrait of King Chulalongkorn wearing the raj pattern costume

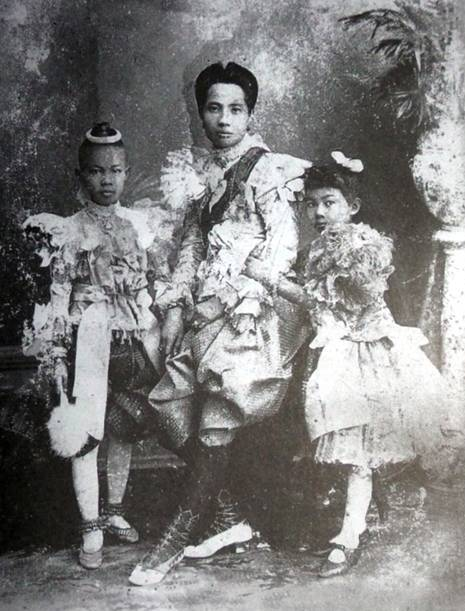
Chum Krairoek Royal Highness Consort of King Chulalongkorn and her daughters in 1900s

As same as Ayutthaya period, both Thai males and females dressed themselves with a loincloth wrap called chong kraben. Men wore their chong kraben to cover the waist to halfway down the thigh, while women covered the waist to well below the knee. Bare chests and bare feet were accepted as part of the Thai formal dress code, and is observed in murals, illustrated manuscripts, and early photographs up to the middle of the 1800s. However, after the Second Fall of Ayutthaya, central Thai women began cutting their hair in a crew-cut short style, which remained the national hairstyle until the 1900s. Prior to the 20th century, the primary markers that distinguished class in Thai clothing were the use of cotton and silk cloths with printed or woven motifs, but both commoners and royals alike wore wrapped, not stitched clothing.

From the 1860s onward, Thai royals "selectively adopted Victorian corporeal and sartorial etiquette to fashion modern personas that were publicized domestically and internationally by means of mechanically reproduced images." Stitched clothing, including court attire and ceremonial uniforms, were invented during the reign of King Chulalongkorn. Western forms of dress became popular among urbanites in Bangkok during this time period.

During the early 1900s, King Rama VI launched a campaign to encourage Thai women to wear long hair instead of traditional short hair, and to wear pha sinh (ผ้าซิ่น), a tubular skirt, instead of the chong kraben (โจงกระเบน), a cloth wrap.

== See also ==
- Coronation of the Thai monarch
- List of Thai monarchs
  - Family tree of Thai monarchs
- History of Bangkok
